= George Harper =

George Harper may refer to:

- George Harper (MP) (1503–1558), in 1545 MP for Kent
- George Harper (British Army officer) (1865–1922), British general during the First World War
- George Harper (pitcher) (1866–1931), Major League Baseball pitcher
- George Harper (outfielder) (1892–1978), Major League Baseball outfielder
- George Harper (cricketer, born 1865) (1865–?), English cricketer
- George Harper (cricketer, born 1988), American born English cricketer
- George Harper (cyclist) (born 1992), English cyclist
- George Harper (rugby union) (1867–1937), New Zealand rugby union player
- George Harper (footballer) (1877–1914), English footballer
- George Harper (lawyer) (1843–1937), New Zealand lawyer
- George B. Harper (1918–1988), member of the New Jersey Senate
- George McLean Harper (1859 or 1860–1947), American literature professor
- George McLean Harper Jr. (1899 or 1900–1979), American classicist
- George Mills Harper (1914–2006), American academic
