= George McLean =

George McLean may refer to:

== Politicians ==
- George P. McLean (1857–1932), American senator from Connecticut
- George McLean (Canadian politician) (1885–1975), Canadian member of parliament, 1935–1945
- George McLean (New Zealand politician) (1834–1917), New Zealand member of parliament

== Sportsmen ==
- George McLean (footballer, born 1898), Scottish footballer
- George McLean (footballer, born 1937), Scottish footballer
- George McLean (footballer, born 1943), Scottish international footballer
- George McLean (golfer) (1893–1951), American professional golfer

== Others ==
- George McLean (journalist) (1923–2016), Canadian news anchor and journalist
- George F. McLean (1929–2016), professor of philosophy of the Catholic University of America

== See also ==
- George McLean Harper (1859/1860–1947), American literature professor
- George McLean Harper Jr. (1899 or 1900–1979), American classicist
