= The Ballad of the Dark Ladié =

1798 poem by Samuel Taylor Coleridge

The Ballad of the Dark Ladié: A Fragment
- by Samuel Taylor Coleridge
- Written: 1798
- Meter: Iambic tetrameter Iambic trimeter
- Publication date: 1834
- Lines: 60

"The Ballad of the Dark Ladié: A Fragment" is a poem by Samuel Taylor Coleridge, written in 1798 and published in 1834.

== Publication ==
This poem was first published in 1834. "In a manuscript list (undated) of the poems drawn up by Coleridge appear these items together: Love 96 lines … The Black Ladié 190 lines." A MS. of the three last stanzas is extant. In Chapter XIV of the Biographia Literaria, Coleridge synchronizes the Dark Ladié (a poem which he was 'preparing' with the Christabel). It would seem probable that it belongs to the spring or early summer of 1798, and that it was anterior to Love, which was first published in The Morning Post on 21 December 1799, under the heading "Introduction to the Tale of the Dark Ladié". If the MS. List of Poems is the record of poems actually written, two-thirds of the Dark Ladié must have perished long before 1817, when Sibylline Leaves was passing through the press, and it was found necessary to swell the Contents with "two School-boy Poems" and "with a song modernised with some additions from one of our elder poets".

== Text ==
Beneath yon birch with silver bark, And boughs so pendulous and fair, The brook falls scatter'd down the rock: And all is mossy there! And there upon the moss she sits, The Dark Ladié in silent pain; The heavy tear is in her eye, And drops and swells again. Three times she sends her little page Up the castled mountain's breast, If he might find the Knight that wears The Griffin for his crest. The sun was sloping down the sky, And she had linger'd there all day, Counting moments, dreaming fears— Oh wherefore can he stay? She hears a rustling o'er the brook, She sees far off a swinging bough! 'Tis He! 'Tis my betrothéd Knight! Lord Falkland, it is Thou!' She springs, she clasps him round the neck, She sobs a thousand hopes and fears, Her kisses glowing on his cheeks She quenches with her tears. * * * * * 'My friends with rude ungentle words They scoff and bid me fly to thee! O give me shelter in thy breast! O shield and shelter me! 'My Henry, I have given thee much, I gave what I can ne'er recall, I gave my heart, I gave my peace, O Heaven! I gave thee all.'	The Knight made answer to the Maid, While to his heart he held her hand, 'Nine castles hath my noble sire, None statelier in the land. 'The fairest one shall be my love's, The fairest castle of the nine! Wait only till the stars peep out, The fairest shall be thine: 'Wait only till the hand of eve Hath wholly closed yon western bars, And through the dark we two will steal Beneath the twinkling stars!'— 'The dark? the dark? No! not the dark? The twinkling stars? How, Henry? How?'; O God! 'twas in the eye of noon He pledged his sacred vow! And in the eye of noon my love Shall lead me from my mother's door, Sweet boys and girls all clothed in white Strewing flowers before: But first the nodding minstrels go (Note: Lines 53–6: And first the nodding Minstrels go With music fit for lovely Bowers, The children then in snowy robes, Strewing Buds and Flowers. (MS. S. T. C.)); With music meet for lordly bowers, The children next in snow-white vests, Strewing buds and flowers! And then my love and I shall pace. (Note: Line 57: pace] go (MS. S. T. C.)); My jet black hair in pearly braids, Between our comely bachelors And blushing bridal maids. * * * * *

== Sources ==
- Coleridge, Samuel Taylor (1817). Biographia Literaria; or, Biographical Sketches of My Literary Life and Opinions. Vol. 2. London: Rest Fenner. p. 3.
- Coleridge, Ernest Hartley, ed. (1912). The Complete Poetical Works of Samuel Taylor Coleridge. Oxford: Clarendon Press. pp. 293–95.
