= Time, Real and Imaginary =

Poem by Samuel Taylor Coleridge

- by Samuel Taylor Coleridge
- Country: England
- Genre(s): Romanticism
- Meter: Iambic pentameter Iambic trimeter
- Rhyme scheme: ABABCCBDDEE
- Publication date: 1817
- Lines: 11

Full text
- Time, Real and Imaginary at Wikisource

"Time, Real and Imaginary. An Allegory" is a short poem of 11 lines written by Samuel Taylor Coleridge at an uncertain date, and first published in 1817.

== Text ==
The poem was first published in Sibylline Leaves, 1817, in the preliminary matter. It was included in the 1828, 1829, and 1834 editions of Coleridge's poetry. The date of composition is uncertain, although Ernest Hartley Coleridge gives c. 1812.

On the wide level of a mountain's head,
(I knew not where, but 'twas some faery place)
Their pinions, ostrich-like, for sails out-spread,
Two lovely children run an endless race,
A sister and a brother!
This far outstripp'd the other;
Yet ever runs she with reverted face.
And looks and listens for the boy behind:
For he, alas! is blind!
O'er rough and smooth with even step he passed,
And knows not whether he be first or last.

== Analysis ==
In the 'Preface' to Sibylline Leaves, p. iii, an apology is offered for the insertion of the poem on the plea that it was a 'school boy poem' added 'at the request of the friends of my youth'. The title is explained as follows:—'By imaginary Time, I meant the state of a school boy's mind when on his return to school he projects his being in his day dreams, and lives in his next holidays, six months hence; and this I contrasted with real Time.'

In a Notebook of c. 1811 there is an attempt to analyse and illustrate the 'sense of Time', which appears to have been written before the lines as published in Sibylline Leaves took shape:

How marked the contrast between troubled manhood and joyously-active youth in the sense of time! To the former, time like the sun in an empty sky is never seen to move, but only to have moved. There, there it was, and now 'tis here, now distant! yet all a blank between. To the latter it is as the full moon in a fine breezy October night, driving on amid clouds of all shapes and hues, and kindling shifting colours, like an ostrich in its speed, and yet seems not to have moved at all. This I feel to be a just image of time real and time as felt, in two different states of being. The title of the poem therefore (for poem it ought to be) should be time real and time felt (in the sense of time) in active youth, or activity with hope and fullness of aim in any period, and in despondent, objectless manhood—time objective and subjective.

== Bibliography ==
- Coleridge: E. H., ed. (1895). Anima Poetæ: From the Unpublished Note-books of Samuel Taylor Coleridge. London: William Heinemann. pp. 241–243.
- Coleridge, E. H., ed. (1912). The Complete Poetical Works of Samuel Taylor Coleridge. Vol. 1. Oxford: Clarendon Press.
