= Lewti =

1798 poem by Samuel Taylor Coleridge

Lewti, or the Circassian Love-chaunt
- by Samuel Taylor Coleridge
- Meter: Iambic tetrameter
- Rhyme scheme: Irregular
- Publication date: 1798; 1800; 1817; 1828; 1829; 1834
- Lines: 83

Full text
- Sibylline Leaves (Coleridge)/Lewti at Wikisource

"Lewti, or the Circassian Love-chaunt" is a poem by Samuel Taylor Coleridge, first published in 1798.

== Publication ==
This poem was first published in the Morning Post (under the signature Nicias Erythraeus), on 18 April 1798: and was included in the Annual Anthology, 1800; and Sibylline Leaves, 1817, 1828, 1829, and 1834. In the Morning Post the poem was originally entitled "Lewti; or the Circassian's Love Chant".

"Lewti" was to have been included in the Lyrical Ballads of 1798, but at the last moment the sheets containing it were cancelled and "The Nightingale" substituted. A copy which belonged to Southey, with the new Table of Contents and "The Nightingale" bound up with the text as at first printed, is in the British Library. Another copy is extant which contains the first Table of Contents only, and Lewti without the addition of "The Nightingale". In the Morning Post the following note accompanies the poem:

It is not amongst the least pleasing of our recollections, that we have been the means of gratifying the public taste with some exquisite pieces of Original Poetry. For many of them we have been indebted to the author of the Circassian's Love Chant. Amidst images of war and woe, amidst scenes of carnage and horror of devastation and dismay, it may afford the mind a temporary relief to wander to the magic haunts of the Muses, to bowers and fountains which the despoiling powers of war have never visited, and where the lover pours forth his complaint, or receives the recompense of his constancy. The whole of the subsequent Love Chant is in a warm and impassioned strain. The fifth and last stanzas are, we think, the best.

== Text ==
At midnight by the stream I roved, To forget the form I loved. Image of Lewti! from my mind Depart; for Lewti is not kind. The Moon was high, the moonlight gleam And the shadow of a star Heaved upon Tamaha's stream; But the rock shone brighter far, The rock half sheltered from my view By pendent boughs of tressy yew.— So shines my Lewti's forehead fair, Gleaming through her sable hair. Image of Lewti! from my mind Depart; for Lewti is not kind. (Note: Between lines 14–15: I saw the white waves, o'er and o'er, Break against the distant shore. All at once upon the sight, All at once they broke in light; I heard no murmur of their roar, Nor ever I beheld them flowing, Neither coming, neither going; But only saw them o'er and o'er, Break against the curved shore: Now disappearing from the sight, Now twinkling regular and white, And Lewti's smiling mouth can shew As white and regular a row. Nay, treach'rous image from my mind Depart; for Lewti is not kind. (Morning Post)) I saw a cloud of palest hue, Onward to the moon it passed; Still brighter and more bright it grew, With floating colours not a few, Till it reached the moon at last: Then the cloud was wholly bright, With a rich and amber light! And so with many a hope I seek, And with such joy I find my Lewti; And even so my pale wan cheek Drinks in as deep a flush of beauty! Nay, treacherous image! leave my mind, If Lewti never will be kind. The little cloud—it floats away Away it goes; away so soon! Alas! it has no power to stay: Its hues are dim, its hues are grey— Away it passes from the moon! How mournfully it seems to fly, Ever fading more and more, To joyless regions of the sky— And now 'tis whiter than before! As white as my poor cheek will be, When, Lewti! on my couch I lie, A dying man for love of thee. Nay, treacherous image! leave my mind— And yet, thou didst not look unkind. I saw a vapour in the sky, Thin, and white, and very high; I ne'er beheld so thin a cloud: Perhaps the breezes that can fly Now below and now above, Have snatched aloft the lawny shroud Of Lady fair—that died for love. For maids, as well as youths, have perished From fruitless love too fondly cherished. Nay, treacherous image! leave my mind— For (Note: Line 52: For] Tho' (Morning Post)) Lewti never will be kind. (Note: Between lines 52–3: This hand should make his life-blood flow, That ever scorn'd my Lewti so. I cannot chuse but fix my sight On that small vapour, thin and white! So thin it scarcely, I protest, Bedims the star that shines behind it! And pity dwells in Lewti's breast Alas! if I knew how to find it. And O! how sweet it were, I wist, To see my Lewti's eyes to-morrow Shine brightly thro' as thin a mist Of pity and repentant sorrow! Nay treach'rous image! leave my mind— Ah, Lewti! why art thou unkind?)	Hush! (Note: Line 53: Hush!] Slush! (Sibylline Leaves; Errata, S. L., p. [xi], for 'Slush' read 'Hush').) my heedless feet from under Slip the crumbling banks for ever: Like echoes to a distant thunder, They plunge into the gentle river. The river-swans have heard my tread. And startle from their reedy bed. O beauteous birds! methinks ye measure Your movements to some heavenly tune! O beauteous birds! 'tis such a pleasure To see you move beneath the moon, I would it were your true delight To sleep by day and wake all night. I know the place where Lewti lies, When silent night has closed her eyes: It is a breezy jasmine-bower, The nightingale sings o'er her head: Voice of the Night! had I the power (Note: Lines 69–71: Had I the enviable power To creep unseen with noiseless tread Then should I view (Morning Post, Annual Anthology) O beating heart had I the power. (MS. Correction, Annual Anthology, by S. T. C.)); That leafy labyrinth to thread, And creep, like thee, with soundless tread, I then might view her bosom white Heaving lovely to my (Note: Line 73: my] the (Morning Post, Annual Anthology)) sight, As these two swans together heave On the gently-swelling wave. Oh! that she saw me in a dream, And dreamt that I had died for care; All pale and wasted I would seem, Yet fair withal, as spirits are! I'd die indeed, if I might see Her bosom heave, and heave for me! Soothe, gentle image! soothe my mind! To-morrow Lewti may be kind.

== Gallery ==
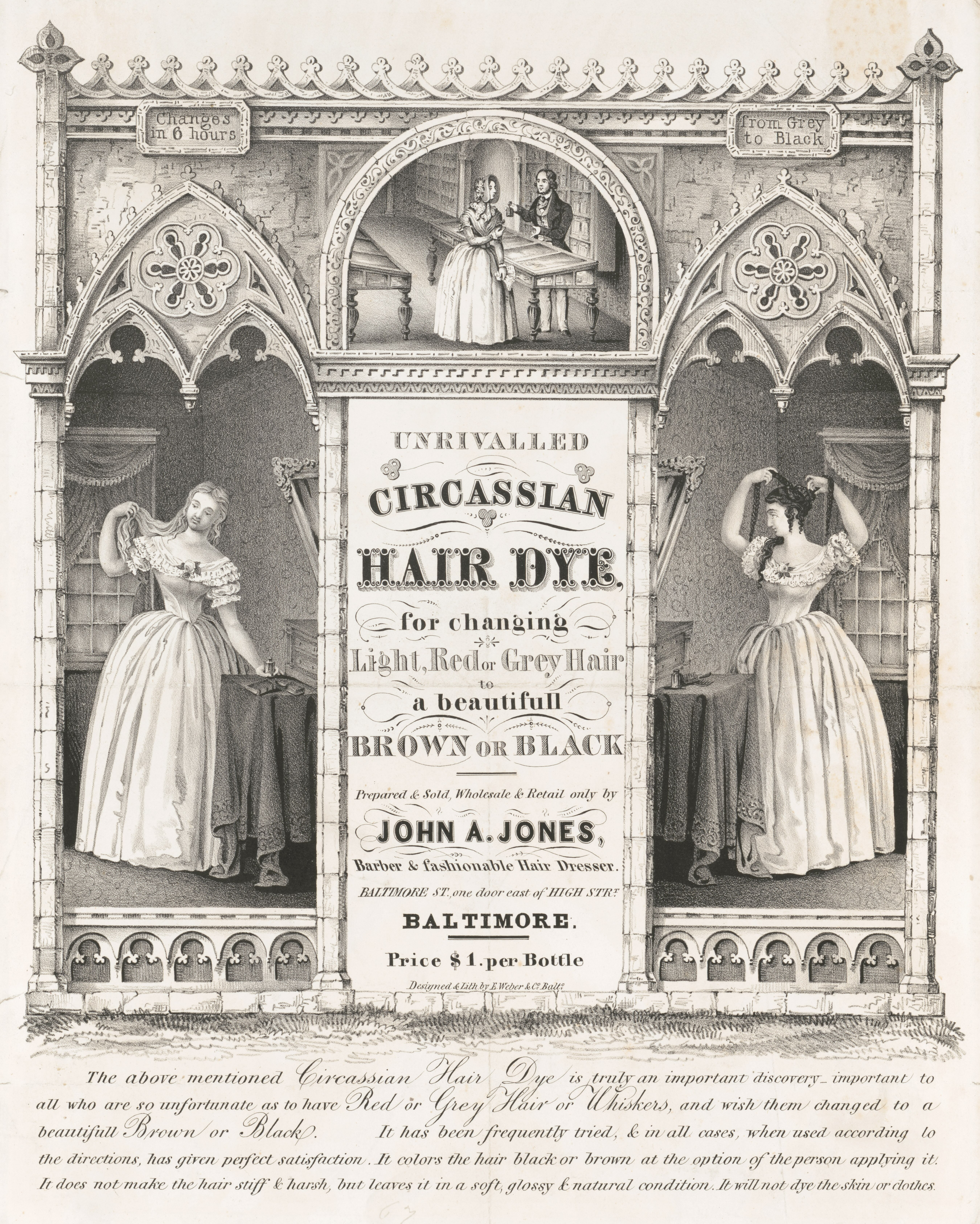
Poster advertising Circassian hair dye, 1843

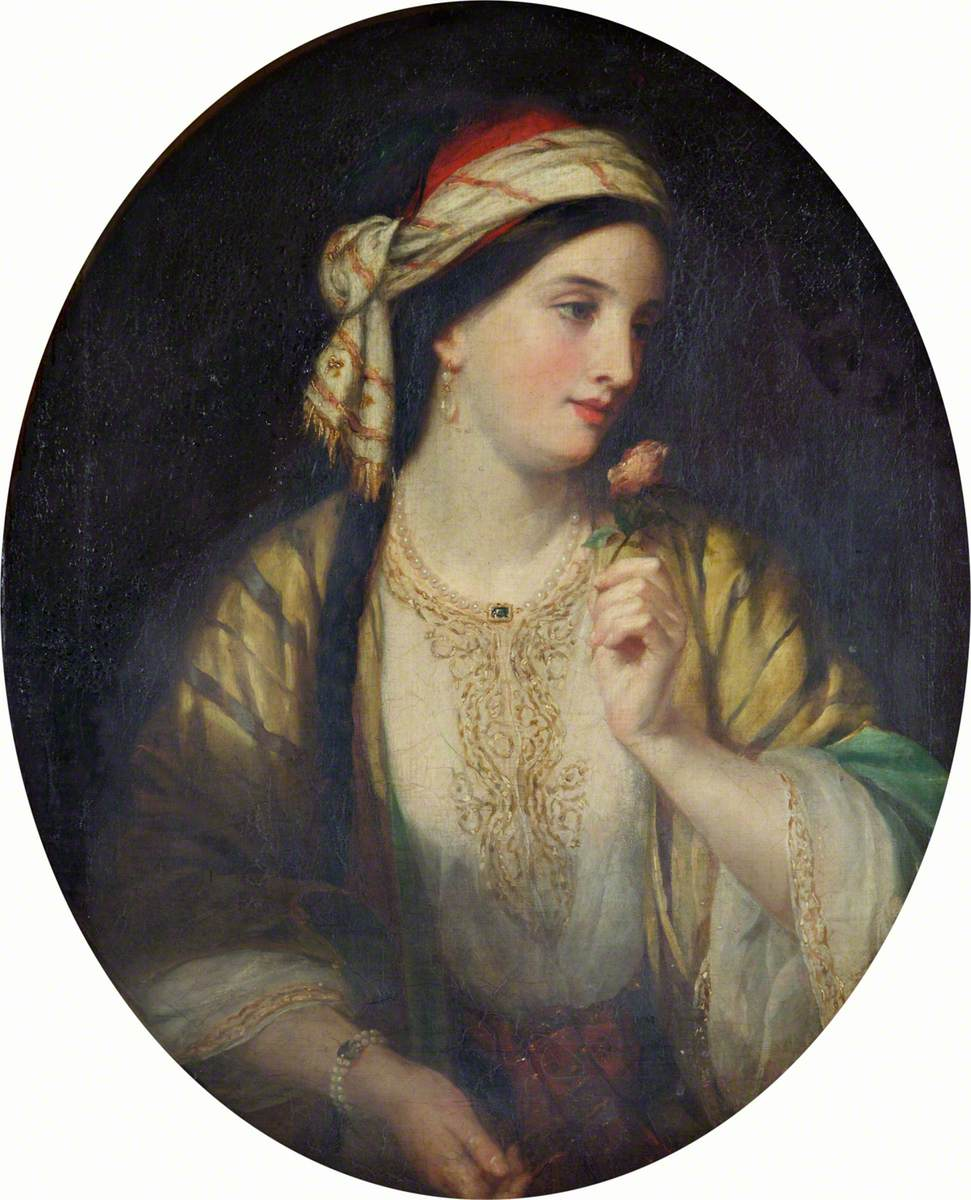
Henry Hall Pickersgill: A Circassian Beauty, c. 1843–50

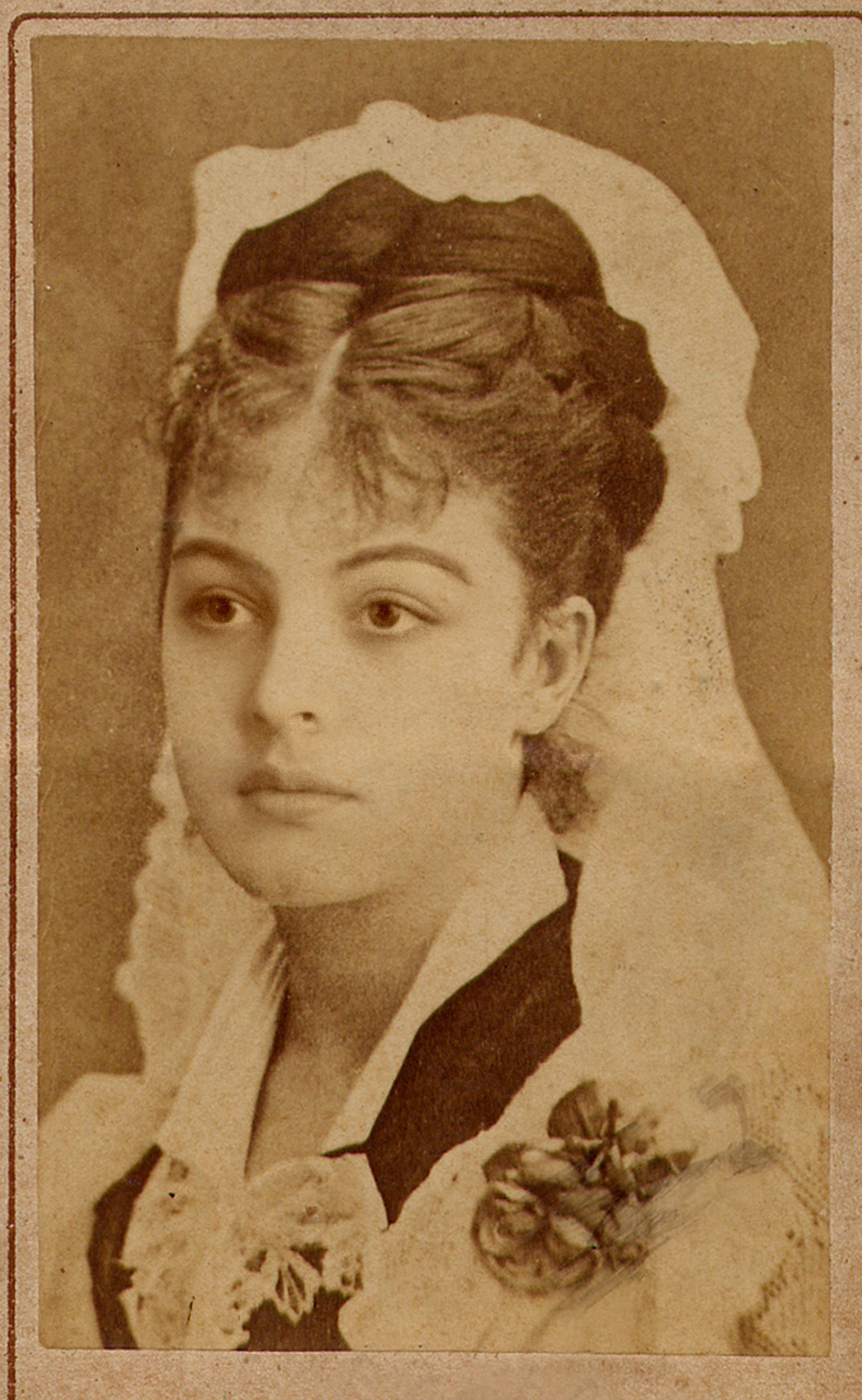
Circassian lady, possibly Nazikeda Kadın

== See also ==
- Circassian beauty
- Circassian music
- Orientalism

== Sources ==
- Coleridge, Ernest Hartley, ed. (1912). The Complete Poetical Works of Samuel Taylor Coleridge. Oxford: Clarendon Press. pp. 253–56, 1049–62.
