= Love (Coleridge) =

Poem by Samuel Taylor Coleridge

- by Samuel Taylor Coleridge
- Written: 1798
- Meter: Iambic tetrameter Iambic trimeter
- Publication date: 1799
- Lines: 96

Full text
- Love (Coleridge) at Wikisource

Love is a poem by Samuel Taylor Coleridge, first published in 1799 as Introduction to the Tale of the Dark Ladie. It was then published in the second edition of Lyrical Ballads (1800).

== Publication ==
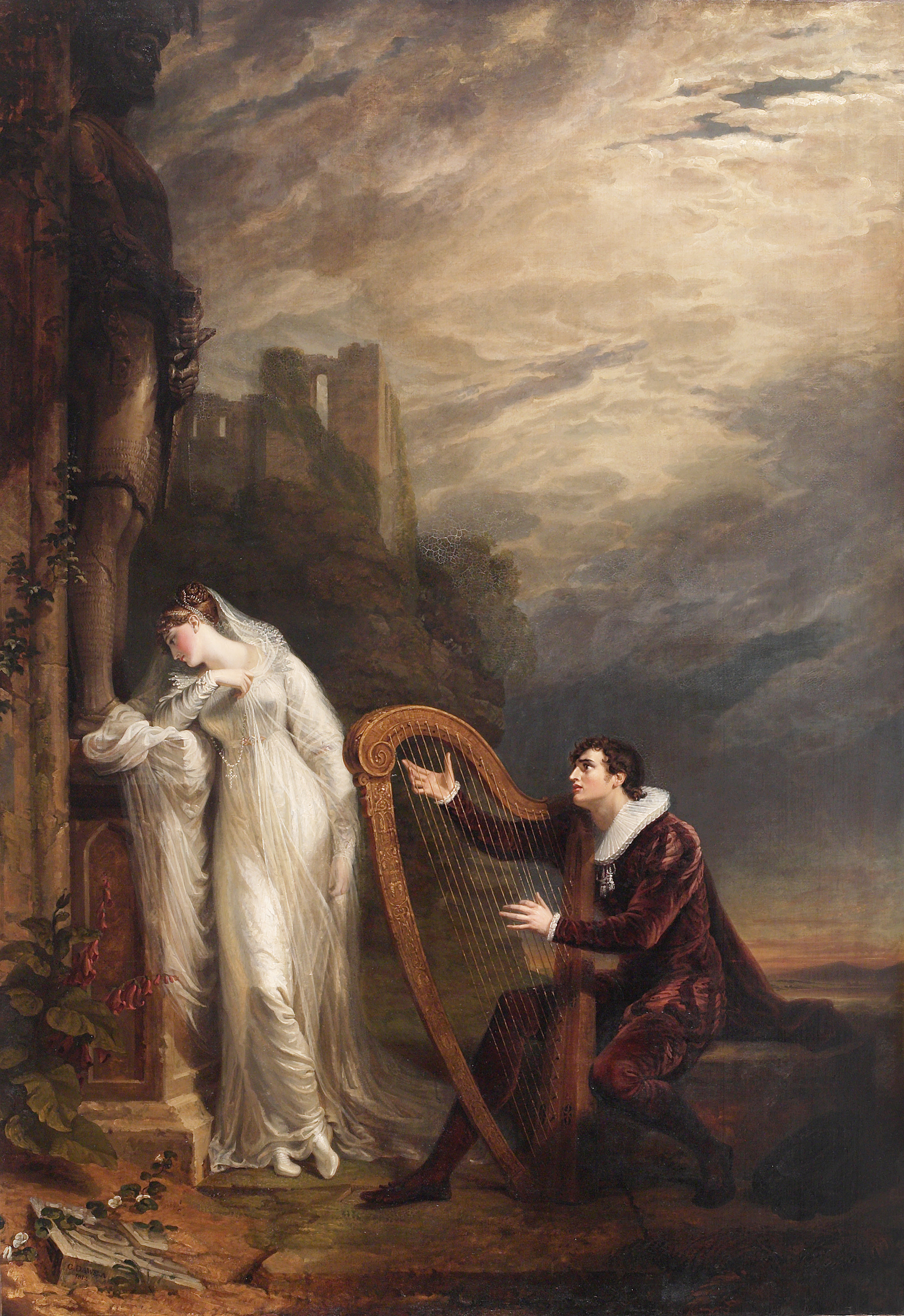
George Dawe's Genevieve (from the poem Love by Coleridge), 1812

This poem was first published (with four preliminary and three concluding stanzas) as the Introduction to the Tale of the Dark Ladie, in the Morning Post, on 21 December 1799: included (as Love) in the Lyrical Ballads of 1800, 1802, 1805: reprinted with the text of the Morning Post in English Minstrelsy, 1810, with the following prefatory note:—"These exquisite stanzas appeared some years ago in a London Newspaper, and have since that time been republished in Mr. Wordsworth's Lyrical Ballads, but with some alterations; the Poet having apparently relinquished his intention of writing the Fate of the Dark Ladye": included (as Love) in Sibylline Leaves, 1828, 1829, and 1834. The four opening and three concluding stanzas with prefatory note were republished in Literary Remains, 1836, and were first collected in 1844. For a facsimile of the MS. of Love as printed in the Lyrical Ballads, 1800, see Wordsworth and Coleridge MSS., edited by W. Hale White, 1897. For a collation of the Introduction to the Tale of the Dark Ladie with two MSS. in the British Library, see Coleridge's Poems. A Facsimile Reproduction, &c., edited by James Dykes Campbell, 1899.

It is probable that the greater part of the Introduction to the Tale of the Dark Ladie was written either during or shortly after a visit which Coleridge paid to the Wordsworths's friends, George and Mary, and Sarah Hutchinson, at Sockburn, a farm-house on the banks of the Tees, in November 1799. In the first draft, ll. 13–16, "She leaned, &c." runs thus:—

She lean'd against a grey stone rudely carv'd,
The statue of an arméd Knight:
She lean'd in melancholy mood
Amid the lingering light.

== Influences ==
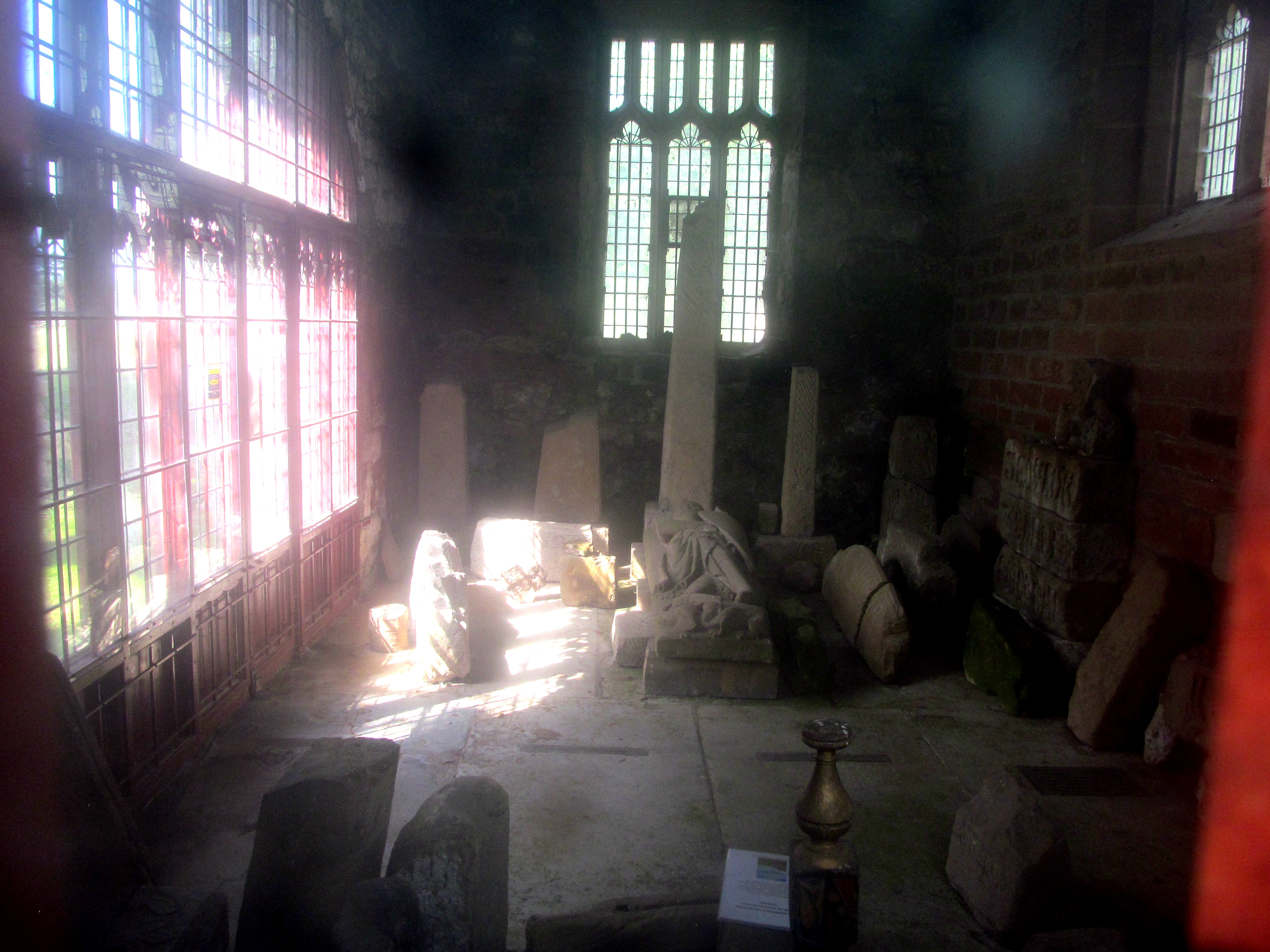
Pre- and post-Conquest sculpture stored in Conyers Chapel, All Saints Church, Sockburn

In the church at Sockburn there was, as of 1912, a recumbent statue of an "armed knight" (of the Conyers family), and in a field near the farm-house there was a "Grey-Stone" which was said to commemorate the slaying of a monstrous wyverne or "worme" by the knight who was buried in the church. Ernest Hartley Coleridge finds it difficult to believe that the "arméd knight" and the "grey stone" of the first draft were not suggested by the statue in Sockburn Church, and the "Grey-Stone" in the adjoining field. It has been argued that the Ballad of the Dark Ladié, of which only a fragment remains, was written after Coleridge returned from Germany, and that the Introduction to the Tale of the Dark Ladie, which embodies Love, was written at Stowey in 1797 or 1798. But in referring to "the plan" of the Lyrical Ballads of 1798, Coleridge says that he had written the Ancient Mariner, and was preparing the Dark Ladie and the Christabel (both unpublished poems when this Chapter was written), but says nothing of so typical a poem as Love. By the Dark Ladié he must have meant the unfinished Ballad of the Dark Ladié, which, at one time, numbered 190 lines, not the Introduction to the Tale of the Dark Ladie, which later on he refers to as the "poem entitled Love", and which had appeared under that title in the Lyrical Ballads of 1800, 1802, and 1805.

In Sibylline Leaves, 1828, 1829, and 1834, Love, which was the first in order of a group of poems with the sub-title "Love Poems", was prefaced by the following motto:—

Quas humilis tenero stylus olim effudit in aevo,
Perlegis hic lacrymas, et quod pharetratus acuta
Ille puer puero fecit mihi cuspide vulnus.
Omnia paulatim consumit longior aetas,
Vivendoque simul morimur, rapimurque manendo.
Ipse mihi collatus enim non ille videbor:
Frons alia est, moresque alii, nova mentis imago,
Voxque aliud sonat—
Pectore nunc gelido calidos miseremur amantes,
Jamque arsisse pudet. Veteres tranquilla tumultus
Mens horret, relegensque alium putat ista locutum.

—Petrarch
Translation:

You peruse the causeless cares that once in my tender youth
my humble pen poured forth. You read here of tears and how the quivered
boy wounded me, a boy, with piercing barb.
Advancing time devours all things by degrees,
and as we live we die, and as we rest we are hurled onward.
For if I am compared with myself I shall not seem the same.
My face is changed, my ways are changed, I have a new kind of understanding,
my voice sounds otherwise –
With cold heart now I pity hot Lovers,
and am ashamed that I myself burned. The peaceful mind shudders at past tumults,
and reading again thinks that some other wrote those words.

Coleridge wrote the following to the editor of the Morning Post:

The following Poem is the Introduction to a somewhat longer one, for which I shall solicit insertion on your next open day. The use of the Old Ballad word, Ladie, for Lady, is the only piece of obsoleteness in it; and as it is professedly a tale of ancient times, I trust, that 'the affectionate lovers of venerable antiquity' (as Camden says) will grant me their pardon, and perhaps may be induced to admit a force and propriety in it. A heavier objection may be adduced against the Author, that in these times of fear and expectation, when novelties explode around us in all directions, he should presume to offer to the public a silly tale of old fashioned love; and, five years ago, I own, I should have allowed and felt the force of this objection. But, alas! explosion has succeeded explosion so rapidly, that novelty itself ceases to appear new; and it is possible that now, even a simple story, wholly unspired [sic? inspired] with politics or personality, may find some attention amid the hubbub of Revolutions, as to those who have resided a long time by the falls of Niagara, the lowest whispering becomes distinctly audible.

== Sources ==
- Campbell, James Dykes, ed. (1899). Coleridge's Poems; A Facsimile Reproduction of the Proofs and MSS. of Some of the Poems. Westminster: A. Constable.
- Coleridge, Henry Nelson, ed. (1836). The Literary Remains of Samuel Taylor Coleridge. Vol. 1. London: William Pickering. pp. 50–2.
- Coleridge, Samuel Taylor (1817). Biographia Literaria; or, Biographical Sketches of My Literary Life and Opinions. Vol. 2. London: Rest Fenner. pp. 3, 298.
- White, William Hale (1897). A Description of the Wordsworth & Coleridge Manuscripts in the Possession of Mr. T. Norton Longman. London: Longmans, Green, and Co. pp. 34–5.
- Wordsworth, William (1800). Lyrical Ballads, with Other Poems. Vol. 1 (2nd ed.). London: T. N. Longman and O. Rees. pp. 138–44.
- Zuccato, Edoardo (2008). Petrarch in Romantic England. Palgrave Macmillan. p. 109. doi:10.1057/9780230584433. ISBN 978-1-349-36016-1.
- English Minstrelsy: Being a Selection of Fugitive Poetry from the Best English Authors. Edinburgh: John Ballantyne and Co. 1810. pp. 131–9.

Attribution:

- Coleridge, Ernest Hartley, ed. (1912). The Complete Poetical Works of Samuel Taylor Coleridge. Oxford: Clarendon Press. pp. 330–35, 1052–59.
