= Conversation poem =

Genre in English poetry

A conversation poem is a genre in English poetry growing out of the close co-operation between Samuel Taylor Coleridge and William Wordsworth in the late 1790s. The name is applied particularly to the group of poems by Coleridge known as the Conversation poems and covers others like them by Wordsworth, these poems being defined as addressing someone very close to the poet in "an informal but serious manner of deliberation that expands from a particular setting". Other examples of such poems include Wordsworth's "Lines written a few miles above Tintern Abbey" and The Prelude. Sometimes the term is extended to informal verse epistles by other poets.
