= Sibylline Leaves =

1817 volume of poems by Samuel Taylor Coleridge

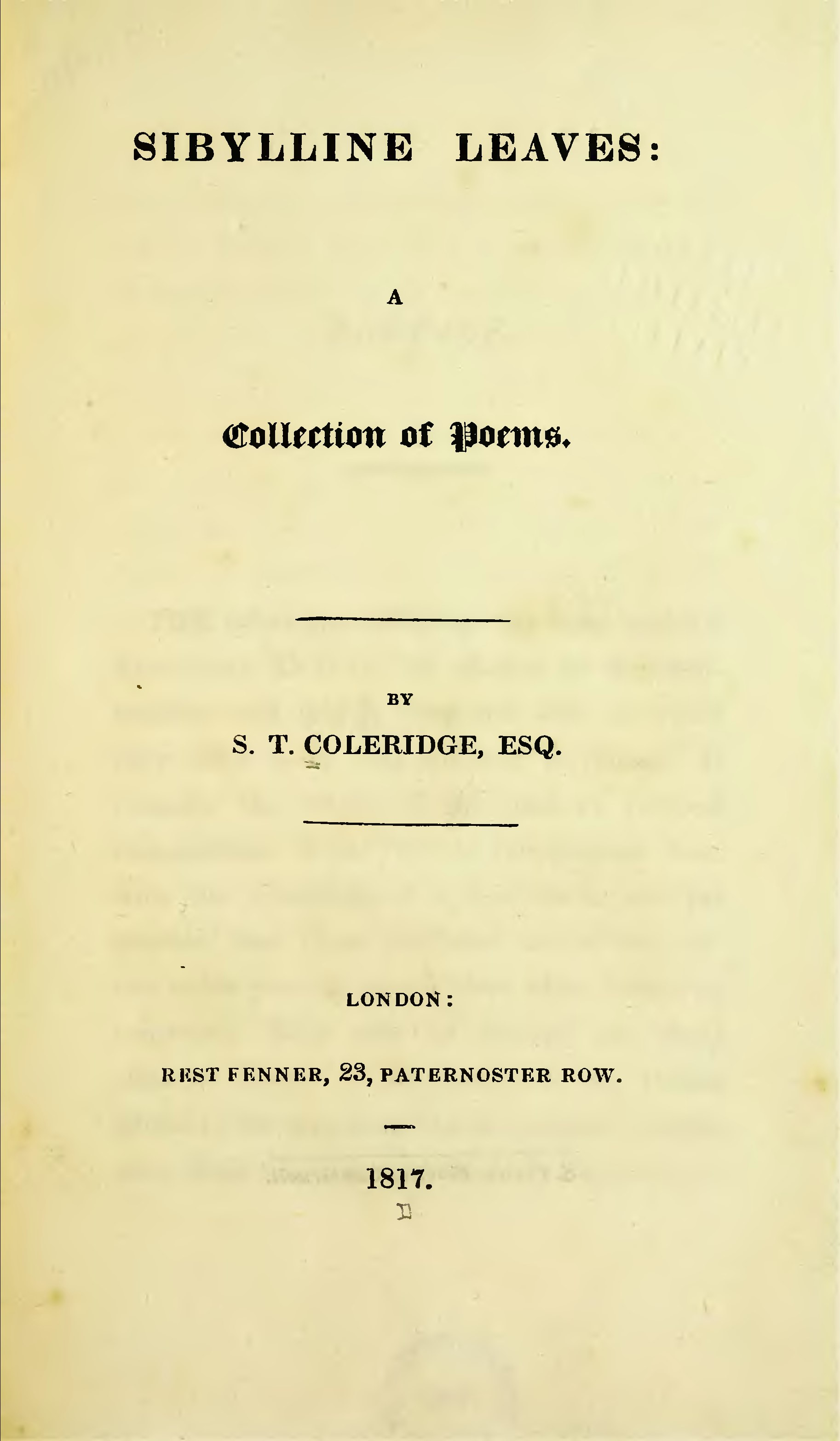
- Title page of the first edition
- Author: Samuel Taylor Coleridge
- Publisher: Rest Fenner
- Publication date: 1817
- Text: Sibylline Leaves at Wikisource

Sibylline Leaves: A Collection of Poems is a volume of poems by Samuel Taylor Coleridge, first published in 1817.

== Contents ==
Poems

Preface

- Time, Real and Imaginary
- The Raven
- Mutual Passion

Errata

- The Rime of the Ancient Mariner
- A Foster Mother’s Tale

Poems Occasioned by Political Events or Feelings Connected With Them

- "When I have borne in memory what has tamed"—Wordsworth
- Ode to the Departing Year
- France; An Ode
- Fears in Solitude
- Recantation. Illustrated in the Story of the Mad Ox
- Parliamentary Oscillators
- Fire, Famine, and Slaughter

Love-poems

- "Quas humilis tenero stylus olim effudit in æto"—Petrarch
- Love
- Lewti
- The Picture
- The Night Scene
- To an Unfortunate Woman, Whom the Author Had Known in the Days of Her Innocence
- To an Unfortunate Woman at the Theatre
- Lines Composed in a Concert Room
- The Keep-sake
- To a Lady
- To a Young Lady
- Something Childish, but Very Natural
- Home-sick
- Answer to a Child’s Question
- The Visionary Hope
- The Happy Husband
- Recollections of Love
- On Re-visiting the Sea-shore After Long Absence

Meditative Poems in Blank Verse

- "Yea, he deserves to find himself deceived"—Schiller
- Hymn, Before Sun-rise, in the Vale of Chamouny
- Lines, Written in the Album at Elbingerode
- On Observing a Blossom
- The Eolian Harp
- Reflections on Having Left a Place of Retirement
- To the Reverend George Coleridge
- Inscription, for a Fountain on a Heath
- A Tombless Epitaph
- This Lime Tree Bower My Prison
- To a Friend
- To a Gentleman
- The Nightingale
- Frost at Midnight
- The Three Graves

Odes and Miscellaneous Poems

- Dejection: An Ode
- Ode to Georgiana, Duchess of Devonshire
- Ode to Tranquillity
- To a Young Friend
- Lines to W. L. Esq. While He Sang a Song to Purcell’s Music
- To a Young Man of Fortune
- Sonnet to the River Otter
- Sonnet, Composed on a Journey Homeward
- Sonnet, to a Friend Who Asked, How I Felt When the Nurse First Presented My Infant to Me
- The Virgin’s Cradle-hymn
- Epitaph, on an Infant
- Melancholy. A Fragment
- Tell’s Birth-place
- A Christmas Carol
- Human Life
- An Ode to the Rain
- The Visit of the Gods
- America to Great Britain
- Elegy, Imitated From One of Akenside's Blank-verse Inscriptions
- The Destiny of Nations

== History ==
Sibylline Leaves, which appeared in 1817 and was described as "A Collection of Poems", included the contents of the 1797 and 1803 editions of Poems on Various Subjects, the poems published in the Lyrical Ballads of 1798 and 1800, and the quarto pamphlet of 1798, but excluded the contents of the 1796 first edition of Poems (except The Eolian Harp), Christabel, Kubla Khan, and The Pains of Sleep. It also included the first publication of the revised and expanded version of The Rime of the Ancient Mariner with marginal gloss.

== Sources ==
- Birch, Dinah, ed. (2009). "Sibylline Leaves". The Oxford Companion to English Literature. 7th ed. Oxford University Press. Retrieved 20 August 2022.

Attribution:
