= Lines Written a Few Miles above Tintern Abbey =

Romantic poem by William Wordsworth

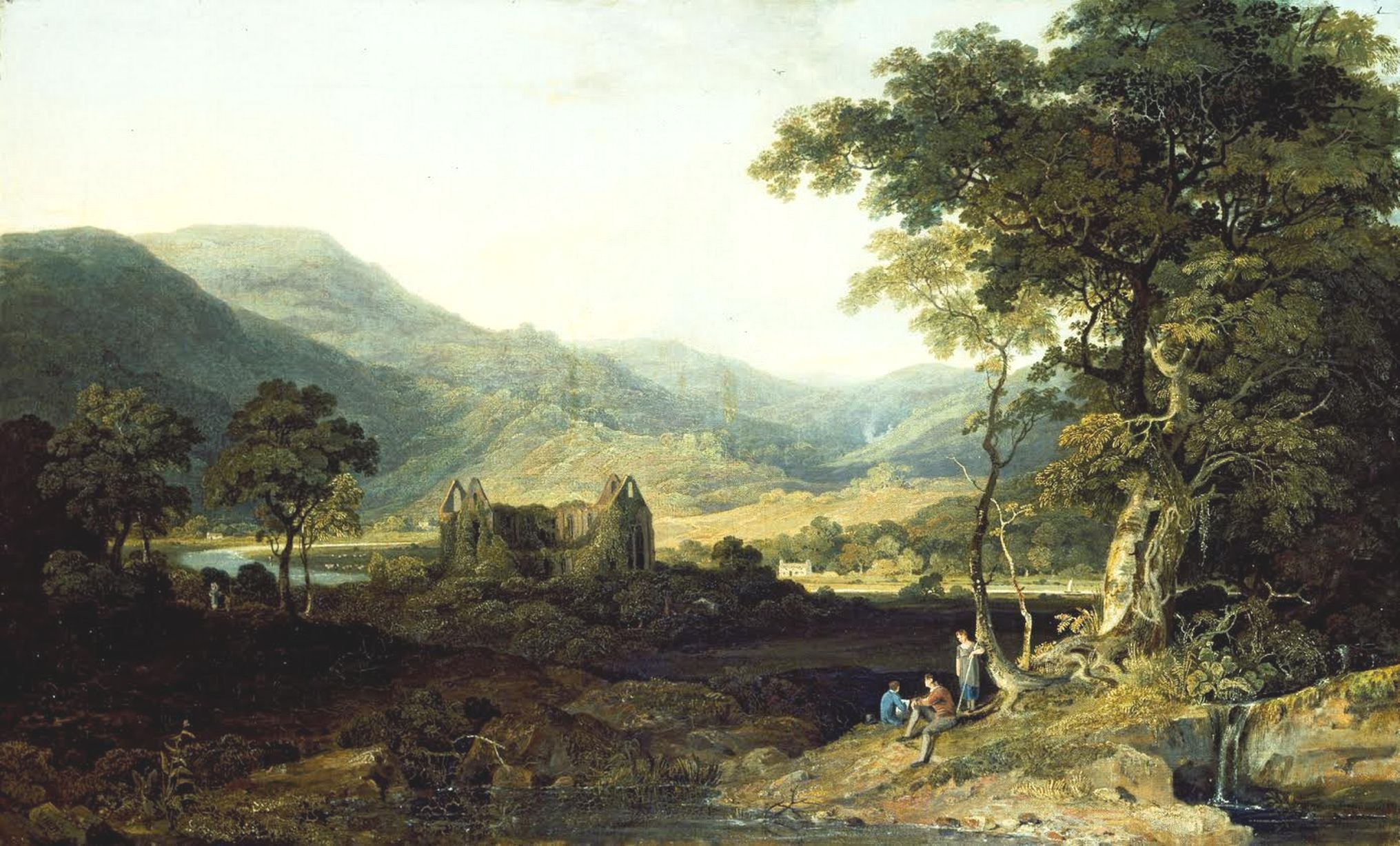
The Abbey and the upper reaches of the Wye, a painting by William Havell, 1804

"Lines Written a Few Miles above Tintern Abbey" is a poem by William Wordsworth. The title, Lines Written (or Composed) a Few Miles above Tintern Abbey, on Revisiting the Banks of the Wye during a Tour, July 13, 1798, is often abbreviated simply to Tintern Abbey, although that building does not appear within the poem. It was written by Wordsworth after a walking tour with his sister in this section of the Welsh Borders. The description of his encounters with the countryside on the banks of the River Wye grows into an outline of his general philosophy. There has been considerable debate about why evidence of the human presence in the landscape has been downplayed and in what way the poem fits within the 18th-century loco-descriptive genre. The poem was published in Lyrical Ballads (1798).

== Background ==
The poem has its roots in Wordsworth's personal history. He had previously visited the area as a troubled twenty-three-year-old in August 1793. Since then he had matured and his seminal poetical relationship with Samuel Taylor Coleridge had begun. Wordsworth claimed to have composed the poem entirely in his head, beginning it upon leaving Tintern and not jotting down so much as a line until he reached Bristol, by which time it had just reached mental completion. Although the Lyrical Ballads upon which the two friends had been working was already in the process of publication, he was so pleased with what he had just written that he had it inserted at the eleventh hour as the concluding poem. Scholars generally agree that it is apt, for the poem represents the climax of Wordsworth's first great period of creative output and prefigures much of the distinctively Wordsworthian verse that was to follow.

The poem is written in tightly structured decasyllabic blank verse and comprises verse paragraphs rather than stanzas. Categorising the poem is difficult, as it contains some elements of the ode and of the dramatic monologue. In the second edition of Lyrical Ballads, Wordsworth noted: "I have not ventured to call this Poem an Ode but it was written with a hope that in the transitions, and the impassioned music of the versification, would be found the principle requisites of that species of composition." The apostrophe at its beginning is reminiscent of the 18th century landscape-poem, but it is now agreed that the best designation of the work would be the conversation poem, which is an organic development of the loco-descriptive. The silent listener in this case is Wordsworth's sister Dorothy, who is addressed in the poem's final section. Transcending the nature poetry written before that date, it employs a much more intellectual and philosophical engagement with the subject that verges on pantheism.

== Outline of themes ==
The poem's tripartite division encompasses a contextual scene-setting, a developing theorisation of the significance of his experience of the landscape, and a final confirmatory address to the implied listener.

Lines 1–49

Revisiting the natural beauty of the Wye after five years fills the poet with a sense of "tranquil restoration". He recognises in the landscape something which had been so internalised as to become the basis for out of the body experience.

Lines 49–111

In "thoughtless youth" the poet had rushed enthusiastically about the landscape and it is only now that he realises the power such scenery has continued to have upon him, even when not physically present there. He identifies in it "a sense sublime/ Of something far more deeply interfused,/ Whose dwelling is the light of setting suns" (lines 95–97) and the immanence of "A motion and a spirit, that impels/ All thinking things, all objects of all thought,/ And rolls through all things" (lines 100–103). With this insight he finds in nature "The anchor of my purest thoughts, the nurse,/ The guide, the guardian of my heart, and soul/ Of all my moral being" (lines 108–111).

Lines 111–159

The third movement of the poem is addressed to his sister Dorothy, "my dearest Friend,/ My dear, dear Friend," as a sharer in this vision and in the conviction that "all which we behold is full of blessings". It is this that will continue to create a lasting bond between them.

== Literary and aesthetic context ==
Having internalised the landscape, Wordsworth claimed now "to see into the life of things" (line 50) and, so enabled, to hear "oftentimes/ The still sad music of humanity" (92–3), but recent critics have used close readings of the poem to question such assertions. For example, Marjorie Levinson views him "as managing to see into the life of things only 'by narrowing and skewing his field of vision' and by excluding 'certain conflictual sights and meanings'". Part of her contention was that he had suppressed mention of the heavy industrial activity in the area, although it has since been argued that the "wreaths of smoke", playfully interpreted by Wordsworth as possible evidence "of some Hermit's cave" upslope, in fact acknowledges the presence of the local ironworks, or of charcoal burning, or of a paper works.

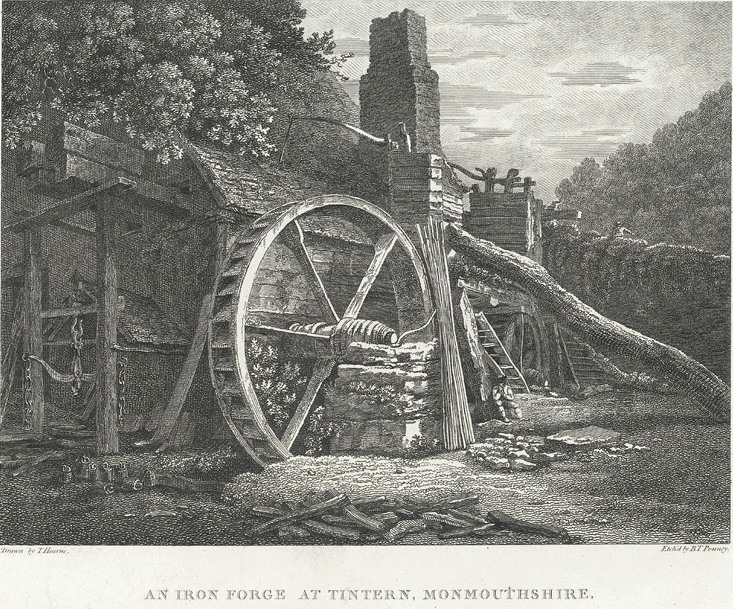
A print by Thomas Hearne of the "Iron Forge at Tintern" (1795)

Another contribution to the debate has been Crystal Lake's study of other poems written after a visit to Tintern Abbey, particularly those from about the same time as Wordsworth's. Noting not just the absence of direct engagement on his part with "the still sad music of humanity" in its present industrial manifestation, but also of its past evidence in the ruins of the abbey itself, she concludes that this "confirms Marjorie Levinson's well-known argument that the local politics of the Monmouthshire landscape require erasure if Wordsworth's poem is to advance its aesthetic agenda."

The poems concerned include the following:

- 1745. Rev. Dr. Sneyd Davies, Epistle IV "Describing a Voyage to Tintern Abbey, in Monmouthshire, from Whitminster in Gloucestershire"
- About 1790. Rev. Duncomb Davis, "Poetical description of Tintern Abbey"
- 1790s. Edmund Gardner, "Sonnet written in Tintern Abbey"
- 1796. Edward Jerningham, "Tintern Abbey"
- About 1800. Rev. Luke Booker, "Original sonnet composed on leaving Tintern Abbey and proceeding with a party of friends down the River Wye to Chepstow"

As the boat carrying Sneyd Davies neared Tintern Abbey, he noted the presence of "naked quarries" before passing to the ruins, bathed in evening light and blending into the natural surroundings to give a sense of "pleasurable sadness". The poem by Davies more or less sets the emotional tone for the poems to come and brackets past and present human traces far more directly than does Wordsworth. His fellow clergyman Duncomb Davis, being from the area, goes into more detail. After a historical deviation, he returns to the present, where

... now no bell calls monks to morning prayer,
Daws only chant their early matins there,
Black forges smoke, and noisy hammers beat
Where sooty Cyclops puffing, drink and sweat,

following this with a description of the smelting process and a reflection that the present is more virtuous than the past. He anticipates Wordsworth by drawing a moral lesson from the scene, in his case noting the ivy-swathed ruin and exhorting,

Fix deep the bright exemplar in thy heart:
To friendship's sacred call with joy attend,
Cling, like the ivy, round a falling friend.

Similar reflections appear in the two contemporary sonnets. For Edmund Gardner, "Man's but a temple of a shorter date", while Luke Booker, embarking at sunset, hopes to sail as peacefully to the "eternal Ocean" at death. The action of Wordsworth's poem therefore takes place in an already established moral landscape. Its retrospective mood draws on a particularly 18th century emotional sensibility also found in Edward Jerningham's description of the ruins, with their natural adornments of moss and 'flow'rets', and reflected in J. M. W. Turner's watercolour of them. Wordsworth's preference in his poem is for the broader picture rather than human detail, but otherwise it fits seamlessly within its contemporary literary and aesthetic context.

== Responses ==
There have been two more recent American responses to Wordsworth's poem. Billy Collins engages with the long title "Lines Composed a Few Miles above Tintern Abbey, On Revisiting the Banks of the Wye during a Tour, July 13, 1798" with a long title of his own two centuries later, "Lines Composed Three Thousand Miles From Tintern Abbey", published in Poetry in March, 1997. There too he engages with the original poem's middle section in which Wordsworth deals with the memory of his former visit to the area,

And now, with gleams of half-extinguished thought,
With many recognitions dim and faint,
And somewhat of a sad perplexity,
The picture of the mind revives again.

Collins restates the sentiment in a more pedestrian way as "I was here before, a long time ago,/ and now I am here again", and then elaborates the thesis through the rest of his poem of how revisiting whatever scene or occasion will always fall short of recreating the freshness of a first impression.

Another response comes from the deafblind writer John Lee Clark. His "A protactile version of Tintern Abbey" embodies a tangential attempt through physical rather than conceptual means "to embrace Wordsworth's challenge of capturing beauty without sight, using tactile language to evoke sensory depth". Both further the reader's appreciation of a familiar text by approaching it from a novel angle and perhaps 'reviving' something of the inward experience that Wordsworth considered so important to communicate.

== Bibliography ==
- Durrant, Geoffrey. William Wordsworth (Cambridge: Cambridge University Press, 1969)
