= To William Wordsworth =

Poem written by Samuel Taylor Coleridge

To William Wordsworth is a poem by Samuel Taylor Coleridge written in 1807 as a response to poet William Wordsworth's autobiographical poem The Prelude, called here "that prophetic lay". Wordsworth had recited that poem to his friend Coleridge personally. In his poem, Coleridge praises Wordsworth's understanding of both external and human nature, at the same time emphasizing Wordsworth's poetic achievement and downplaying his own.

== Background ==
Coleridge stayed with his friends William and Dorothy Wordsworth during the Winter of 1806–1807 at their home in Coleorton. During this time, William Wordsworth finished The Prelude and proceeded to read it to Coleridge. In response, Coleridge wrote To William Wordsworth, in January 1807, to capture his positive feelings about his friend's poem. The Prelude was in a five book form by 1804 when Coleridge first read the work, but the version Wordsworth read was a much expanded version that was new to him. Wordsworth read the poem in hopes that Coleridge would be put in a better mood and that Coleridge would help Wordsworth work on The Recluse. Portions of the poem were printed in the Friend in 1809, but Wordsworth did not wish it to be published because of the private nature of Coleridge's response.

It was first published in Coleridge's 1817 collection of poetry titled Sibylline Leaves. There are differences in the manuscript versions and the printed versions, which are due to changes in Coleridge's memory of the incident. Later editions changed very little, but the title To William Wordsworth wasn't included until 1834, which made the full title To William Wordsworth, Composed on the Night After His Recitation of a Poem on the Growth of an Individual Mind.

== Poem ==
The poem paraphrases the ideas of Wordsworth's The Prelude:

Into my heart have I received that Lay
More than historic, that prophetic Lay
Wherein (high theme by thee first sung aright)
Of the foundations and the building up
Of a Human Spirit thou hast dared to tell
What may be told, to the understanding mind
Revealable; and what within the mind
By vital breathings secret as the soul
Of vernal growth, oft quickens in the heart
Thoughts all too deep for words!—

— Lines 2-11

The poem continues with an image of mourning and then praising Wordsworth:

And Genius given, and Knowledge won in vain;
And all which I had culled in wood-walks wild,
And all which patient toil had reared, and all,
Commune with thee had opened out—but flowers
Strewed on my corse, and borne upon my bier
In the same coffin, for the self-same grave!
That way no more! and ill beseems it me,
Who came a welcomer in herald's guise,
Singing of Glory, and Futurity,
To wander back on such unhealthful road,
Plucking the poisons of self-harm! And ill
Such intertwine beseems triumphal wreaths
Strew'd before thy advancing!

— Lines 70-82

The poem ends with the narrator describing the overall effect that The Prelude had upon him:

Scarce conscious, and yet conscious of its close
I sate, my being blended in one thought
(Thought was it? or aspiration? or resolve?)
Absorbed, yet hanging still upon the sound—
And when I rose, I found myself in prayer.

— Lines 108-112

== Themes ==
To William Wordsworth summarises the themes within The Prelude and deals with Wordsworth's understanding of his mind and its relationship with nature. As such, Coleridge favours Wordsworth's own views and contradicts feelings found within his own poetry, especially in Dejection. The poem also attacks Coleridge in a masochistic manner and places the writer and his own ideas in an inferior position. One such emphasis was on Wordsworth being able to find bliss from solitude and Coleridge being unable to find anything but pain, which is a dominant theme within his poetry.

The poem serves to contrast Coleridge and Wordsworth. In particular, the poem expresses Coleridge's feelings about his own mind and poetic career. He discuses how he hoped to become great when younger and then how he believes that his ability to write poetry has vanished. Coleridge would have struggled to write To William Wordsworth while Wordsworth did not have such experiences. The praise of Wordsworth also contradicted many of Coleridge's personal feelings at the time, which included jealousy. The poem's emphasis on Wordsworth's greatness is without any jealousy while attacking Coleridge's self in a personal and unhealthy manner.

== Critical response ==
George Watson claims that the poem "is the last pure example that Coleridge's poetry affords of the conversation poem [...] the poem is extravagant in its very being." Rosemary Ashton believes that "Though of course the poem is an epitaph for the passing of his poetic genius, it shows, as Coleridge is aware, 'momentary stars' of imaginative energy on his part, in response to the sustained 'Orphic song' of Wordsworth." Adam Sisman describes the poem and its creation: "Coleridge retired to his room and stayed up most of the night composing lines in which he attempted to express his response — seemingly the only poem he would write that troubled year, and arguably his last poem of any substance."
