= George McLean Harper =

American literature professor (1859/1860–1947)

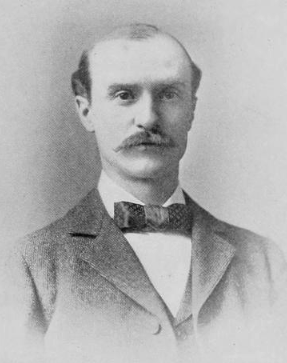
- Photo of Harper published in 1899
- Born: 1859 or 1860; Shippensburg, Pennsylvania, US
- Died: July 14, 1947 (aged 87)
- Spouse: Belle Dunton Westcott
- Children: 2, including George McLean Harper Jr.

Academic background
- Education: Princeton University

Academic work
- Discipline: Professor of Literature
- Institutions: Princeton University

George McLean Harper (1859 or 1860 – July 14, 1947) was an American professor of literature at Princeton University. Harper was best known for his scholarship on the writings and biographies of the English poets Samuel Taylor Coleridge and William Wordsworth.

He was born in Shippensburg, Pennsylvania, and graduated from Princeton University in 1884. After graduating, he worked as an editor for a few years before returning to Princeton in 1892, where he taught French and Italian while working on his PhD. In 1900, Harper became Holmes Professor of Belles Lettres and English Language and Literature at Princeton.

While teaching at Princeton, Harper published several books on literature. He took a position on the panel of Pulitzer Prize judges in 1929. Harper retired from Princeton in 1933 and focused on his own writing. He died in 1947.

== Early life and education ==
George McLean Harper was born in 1859 or 1860 in Shippensburg, Pennsylvania, to William Wylie Harper and Nancy Jane McLean Harper. He studied at Princeton University, where he received a bachelor's degree in 1884. After graduating he was a copy editor and journalist at the New-York Tribune for six months. Afterwards, he studied at the University of Göttingen and University of Berlin. He was assistant editor of Scribner's Magazine from 1887 until 1889.

== Princeton University ==
In 1889, he returned to Princeton as a teacher of French and Italian. He received a master's degree and Doctor of Philosophy from the university in 1892. In 1894, he edited Contes de Balzac. He became the Woodhull Chair in the Department of Romance Languages in 1895.

In 1900, Harper moved to the university's English department, and was named Holmes Professor of Belles Lettres and English Language and Literature. In 1915, he was a member of the American Commission for Relief in Belgium and he was made an Officer of the Crown of Belgium in recognition of his work. His 1916 biography of William Wordsworth, William Wordsworth: His Life, Works, and Influence, was given a positive review in North American Review. His work on Wordsworth was considered "pioneering". He became the Woodrow Wilson Professor of Literature at Princeton in 1926, and held that position until his retirement.

He was a contributor to the Woodrow Wilson memorial edition of The Daily Princetonian published in 1926. He also reviewed Wilson's The New Democracy, Presidential Messages, Address, and Other Papers (1913–1917). In 1928, Harper coined the term "Conversation poems" to describe a group of eight poems by Samuel Taylor Coleridge that were addressed to a close friend of the poet. The name came from the title of "The Nightingale. A Conversation Poem", one of the poems in the group. Harper had previously identified the poems as a distinct group in a 1925 essay. In 1929, Harper became a member of the committee of judges for the Pulitzer Prize.

Harper taught at Princeton until his retirement in 1933, when he began writing a critical biography of Samuel Taylor Coleridge. After his retirement, he became special lecturer in English literature at Princeton.

== Retirement and death ==
In 1939, the festschrift Wordsworth and Coleridge: Studies in Honor of George McLean Harper was published.

He died of a heart attack at the age of 87 on July 14, 1947. He was married to Belle Dunton Westcott, with whom he had a daughter and a son, George McLean Harper Jr. After Harper's death, his wife presented the collected George McLean Harper Papers to Princeton University.

== See also ==
- Conversation poem
