= Dejection: An Ode =

1802 poem by Samuel Taylor Coleridge

"Dejection: An Ode" is a poem written by Samuel Taylor Coleridge in 1802 and was published the same year in The Morning Post, a London daily newspaper. The poem in its original form was written to Sara Hutchinson, a woman who was not his wife, and discusses his feelings of love for her. The various versions of the poem describe Coleridge's inability to write poetry and living in a state of paralysis, but published editions remove his personal feelings and mention of Hutchinson.

== Background ==
Coleridge wrote in his notebook about Hutchinson and possible poems: "Can see nothing extraordinary in her — a Poem nothing all the virtues of the mild & retired kind [...] Poem on this night on Helvellin /William & Dorothy & Mary / —Sara & I — [...] Poem on the length of our acquaintance / all the hours that I have been thinking of her &c." During this time in 1802, Coleridge was separated from his family and he eventually returned home during March. The relationship between him and his wife Sarah Fricker was restarted and they had a daughter, Sara Coleridge in December 1802. However, of the poems he intended to write about Hutchinson, he managed to complete one and an early draft was sent to her in a letter on 4 April 1802.

The original draft was titled "Letter to Sara Hutchinson", and it became Dejection when he sought to publish it. There are many differences between the versions beyond the original being 340 lines and the printed 139 lines as they reflect two different moments in Coleridge's emotional struggle. Also, passages describing his childhood and other personal matters were removed between versions. It was published in the 4 October 1802 Morning Post (see 1802 in poetry). This date corresponding to Wordsworth's wedding to Mary Hutchinson and Coleridge's own wedding anniversary. The poem was grouped with the Asra poems, a series of poems discussing love that were dedicated to Hutchinson. Eventually, Coleridge cut himself off from Hutchinson and renounced his feelings for her, which ended the problems that resulted in the poem.

== Poem ==
The poem takes its epigraph from one the Ballads of Sir Patrick Spence:

Late, late yestreen I saw the new Moon,
With the old Moon in her arms;
And I fear, I fear, my Master dear!
We shall have a deadly storm.

— Sir Patrick Spence, Ballad

The poem begins with a claim that the narrator has lost his ability to write, which fuels the mood of dejection:

Well! If the Bard was weather-wise, who made
The grand old ballad of Sir Patrick Spence,
This night, so tranquil now, will not go hence
Unroused by winds, that ply a busier trade
Than those which mould yon cloud in lazy flakes,
Or the dull sobbing draft, that moans and rakes
Upon the strings of this Æolian lute,
Which better far were mute.
For lo! the New-moon winter-bright!

— from Part I (lines 1-9)

This mood of dejection makes the narrator unable to enjoy nature:

O Lady! in this wan and heartless mood,
To other thoughts by yonder throstle woo'd,
All this long eve, so balmy and serene,
Have I been gazing on the western sky,
And its peculiar tint of yellow green:
And still I gaze—and with how blank an eye!
And those thin clouds above, in flakes and bars,
That give away their motion to the stars;
Those stars, that glide behind them or between,
Now sparkling, now bedimmed, but always seen:
Yon crescent Moon, as fixed as if it grew
In its own cloudless, starless lake of blue;
I see them all so excellently fair,
I see, not feel, how beautiful they are!

— from Part II (lines 25-38)

The poem continues by expression a state of poetic paralysis:

My genial spirits fail;
And what can these avail
To lift the smothering weight from off my breast?
It were a vain endeavour,
Though I should gaze for ever
On that green light that lingers in the west:
I may not hope from outward forms to win
The passion and the life, whose fountains are within.

— Part III (lines 39-46)

The poem continues with the narrator hoping that the woman he desires can be happy:

Joy, Lady! is the spirit and the power,
Which wedding Nature to us gives in dower
A new Earth and new Heaven,
Undreamt of by the sensual and the proud—
Joy is the sweet voice, Joy the luminous cloud—
We in ourselves rejoice!

— from Part V (lines 67-72)

== Themes ==
The poem was a reply to William Wordsworth's "Resolution and Independence". It is also connected to Wordsworth's Immortality Ode in theme and structure. The poem expresses feelings of dejection and the inability to write poetry or to enjoy nature. Wordsworth is introduced into the poem as a counter to Coleridge, because Wordsworth is able to turn such a mood into a benefit and is able to be comforted. However, Coleridge cannot find anything positive in his problems, and he expresses how he feels paralyzed by his emotions. This source of their paralysis was Coleridge's feelings for Hutchinson and problems dealing with his marriage. However, Coleridge couldn't have been completely in dejection or he would have been unable to create the poem.

The poem also captures some feelings in Coleridge's previous works, especially in analyzing a problematic childhood and an exploration of religion. Partly, these feelings were fueled by his inability to accept his opium addiction and other problems. The poems also contain Coleridge's desires for Hutchinson, but these were later removed from the printed edition of the works. The editions are so different that they reflect the conflict and division that Coleridge felt during 1802. The tone of the poems are different, as the original was passionate and emotional, and the printed version was organized and philosophical.

There is a connection between Dejection and Frost at Midnight in everything but its form. This is primarily true of the original version, but many of the personal elements of the poem continue over into the published version. The trimming of the poem allows for Coleridge to emphasize the most important poetic aspects of the original and to create a separation of the form from the subject area which allows for a strong incongruity not in the original.

== Sources ==
Coleridge is responding to, and interacting with, many of Wordsworth's poems. Coleridge's views on dejection and inability to find a positive in such feelings is connected to Wordsworth's Expostulation and Reply. The poem's describing about nature and unable to enjoy natural scenes anymore is connected to the inability to see nature in the same way as previously possible within Wordsworth's Immortality Ode. Like the Immortality Ode, Dejection is a Pindaric Ode.

== Critical response ==
George Watson claims that the trimming of the poem "set forth upon the world as one of the oddest compromises in English poetry: an intensely, bitterly, almost indecently private poem of an unhappily married poet, cast into the most public of all forms, the neoclassical Pindaric. The language swirls upwards and downwards from a studiously conversation opening [...] to passages of a grave sublimity that Coleridge had scarcely ever achieved." He continues, "Not since 'The Ancient Mariner' of four years before had his doctrine of deliberately incongruous form realized anything so arresting. It is by this startling contrast of the formal and the informal that the poem lives, and for just this reason there can be no doubt of the superiority of the final version".

Richard Holmes emphasizes the differences and the positives of both versions of the text as he argues:

The movement of the verse in the first version is swift and spontaneous, a true letter, and the tone is simultaneously exalted and self-pitying; while in 'Dejection' the verse is cunningly shaped into eight irregular stanzas, and the outpouring of grief is carefully controlled and led into a climax of joy and blessing. The first version overwhelms the reader with its intimacy, its torrent of lament and letting-go, which is both shocking and compulsive. The final version holds the reader in an act of high, rhetorical attention, around the proposition that external nature cannot heal the poet (as Wordsworth believed it could) whose own powers are failing [...] Yet however much 'Dejection' is to be preferred as a finished work of art, the 'Letter' draws more directly on Coleridge's true imaginative life. It is richer in, and closer to, those irrepressible sources of imagery which fill his Notebooks and private correspondence:

Rosemary Ashton believes that "Coleridge's special genius scarcely surfaced, though it would do so once more in his great poem 'Dejection: An Ode'".
