= George Harper (cricketer, born 1865) =

English cricketer

George Harper (born 30 August 1865) was an English cricketer. He was a right-handed batsman and a right-arm medium-pace bowler who played for Lancashire. He was born in Notting Hill, London.

Harper made a single first-class appearance for the team, at the age of just 17. He batted in only one innings of the match, scoring a single run.
