= George McLean Harper Jr. =

American classicist (1899 or 1900–1979)

- Born: 1899 or 1900
- Died: August 17, 1979 (aged 79); North Adams, Massachusetts

Academic background
- Education: Princeton University

Academic work
- Discipline: Classics and ancient languages
- Institutions: Williams College

George McLean Harper Jr. (1899 or 1900 – August 17, 1979) was an American professor of ancient languages and classics at Williams College.

== Early life and education ==
George McLean Harper Jr. was born in 1899 or 1900, the son of George McLean Harper and Nancy Harper, and had one sister. His father became Woodrow Wilson Professor of Literature at Princeton University when the chair was established in 1926, and retired in 1932. George McLean Harper Jr. earned a bachelor's degree, master's degree, and doctorate from Princeton.

== Career ==
After graduating, he taught at Trinity College and Yale University.

Harper joined the faculty of Williams College in Williamstown, Massachusetts in 1935. He taught at the university and became chair of its classics department, a position he held for 29 years before retiring in 1967 as the college's Garfield Professor of Ancient Languages emeritus. He was a member of the managing committee of the American School of Classical Studies at Athens in 1936 and 1937.

After retiring, Harper taught part-time at Voorhees College in Denmark, South Carolina. In 1973, the college presented him with an honorary doctor of letters degree. He was a member of the college's board of trustees, and served as its head of development in 1978. The college created the George McLean Harper Jr. Professorship in Humanities in 1978.

His writing appeared in The Atlantic.

== Personal life ==
He married Sylvia Henderson and they lived in New Haven, Connecticut, and Williamstown, Massachusetts. They had four daughters, including Alison Harper and Mary McLean Harper. He died on August 17, 1979 at Adams Regional Hospital in North Adams, Massachusetts.
