= Samuel Taylor Coleridge =

English poet, literary critic and philosopher (1773–1834)

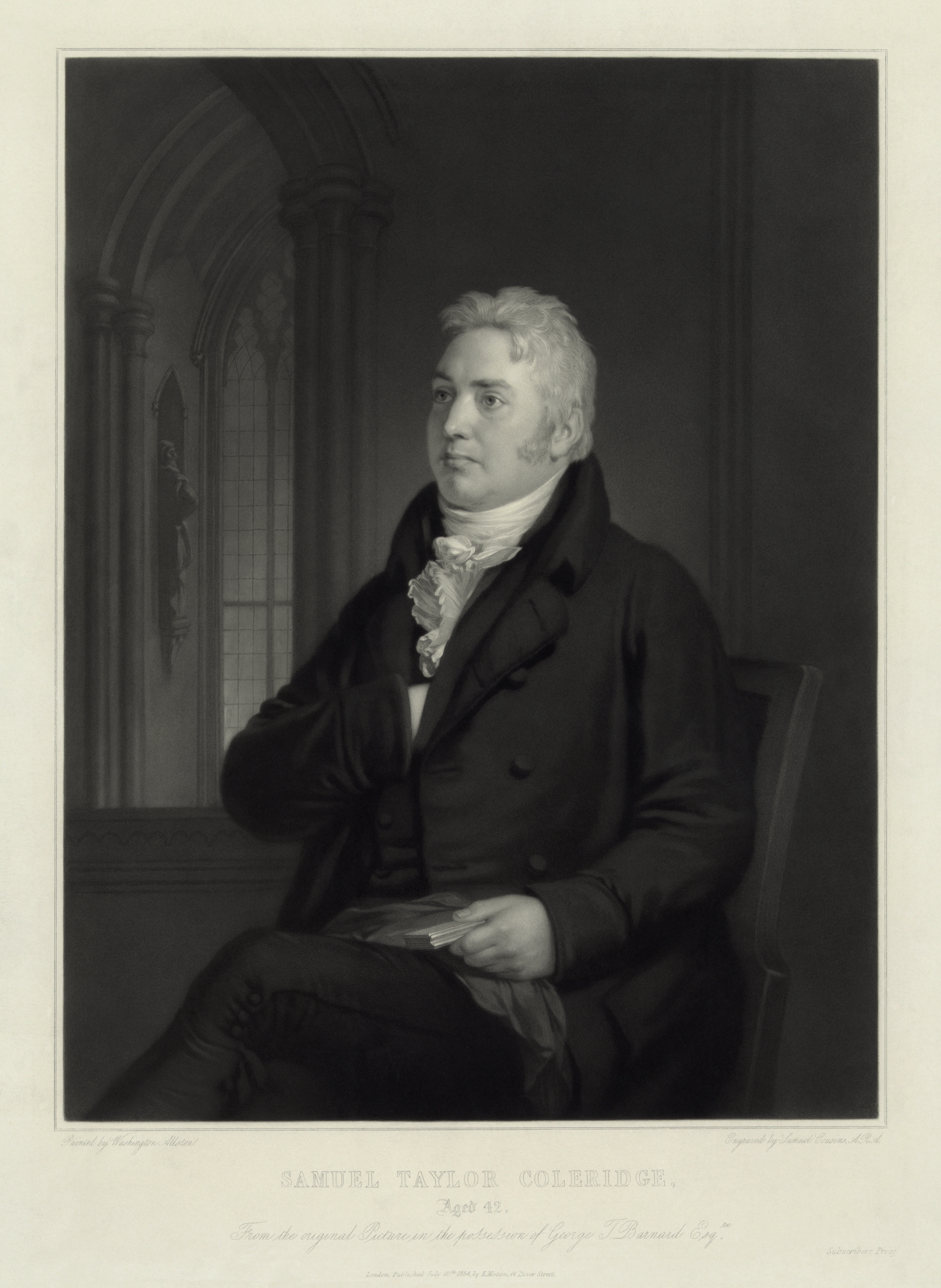
- Samuel Taylor Coleridge aged 42 by Samuel Cousins (1854)
- Born: 21 October 1772; Ottery St Mary, Devon, England
- Died: 25 July 1834 (aged 61); Highgate, Middlesex, England
- Education: Jesus College, Cambridge
- Occupations: Poet; philosopher; critic; moralist; theologian
- Spouse: Sara Fricker (m. 1795)
- Children: 4, including Hartley, Sara and Derwent
- Relatives: James Coleridge (brother)
- Writing career
- Subjects: Spiritual philosophy; politics; religion
- Notable works: The Rime of the Ancient Mariner; Kubla Khan; Christabel; conversation poems; Biographia Literaria
- Movement: Romanticism

Signature
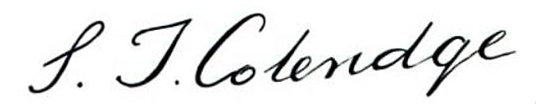

Samuel Taylor Coleridge (/ˈkoʊ.lə.rɪdʒ/ KOH-lə-rij; 21 October 1772 – 25 July 1834) was an English poet, literary critic, philosopher, and theologian who was a founder of the Romantic Movement in England and a member of the Lake Poets with his friend William Wordsworth. He also shared volumes and collaborated with Charles Lamb, Robert Southey, and Charles Lloyd.

Coleridge wrote the poems The Rime of the Ancient Mariner and "Kubla Khan", as well as the major prose work Biographia Literaria. His critical works were highly influential, especially in relation to William Shakespeare, and he helped introduce German idealist philosophy to England. Coleridge coined many words and phrases, from the obscure theological term "sterilifidianism" to the familiar "suspension of disbelief," the avoidance of critical thinking to follow a narrative. He was also an important influence on Ralph Waldo Emerson and the beginnings of American transcendentalism because of his unique interpretation of Immanuel Kant's concept of intuition, which he outlined in both Biographia Literaria and Aids to Reflection.

Throughout his adult life, Coleridge had crippling bouts of anxiety and depression; it has been speculated that he had bipolar disorder, which had not been defined during his lifetime. He was physically unhealthy, which may have stemmed from a bout of rheumatic fever and other childhood illnesses. He was treated for these conditions with laudanum, which fostered a lifelong opium addiction. Coleridge had a turbulent career and personal life with a variety of highs and lows, but his public esteem grew after his death, and he became considered one of the most influential figures in English literature. For instance, a 2018 report by The Guardian labelled him "a genius" who had progressed into "one of the most renowned English poets". Organisations such as the Church of England celebrate his work during public events, such as a "Coleridge Day" in June, with activities including literary recitals.

== Early life and education ==
Coleridge was born on 21 October 1772 in the town of Ottery St Mary in Devon, England. Samuel's father was the Reverend John Coleridge, the well-respected vicar of St Mary's Church, Ottery St Mary, and was headmaster of the King's School, a free grammar school established by King Henry VIII in the town. He had previously been master of Hugh Squier's School in South Molton, Devon, and lecturer of nearby Molland. (Note: "Lecturer of Molland" was an office established and funded by a member of the Courtenay family, lords of the manor of Molland, and involved preaching sermons in Molland Church, possibly also in Knowstone Church adjoining.)

John Coleridge had three children by his first wife. Samuel was the youngest of ten by the Reverend Mr. Coleridge's second wife, Anne Bowden (1726–1809), probably the daughter of John Bowden, mayor of South Molton, Devon, in 1726. Coleridge suggests that he "took no pleasure in boyish sports" but instead read "incessantly" and played by himself. After John Coleridge died in 1781, 8-year-old Samuel was sent to Christ's Hospital, a charity school which was founded in the 16th century in Greyfriars, London, where he remained throughout his childhood, studying and writing poetry. At that school Coleridge became friends with Charles Lamb, a schoolmate, and studied the works of Virgil and William Lisle Bowles.

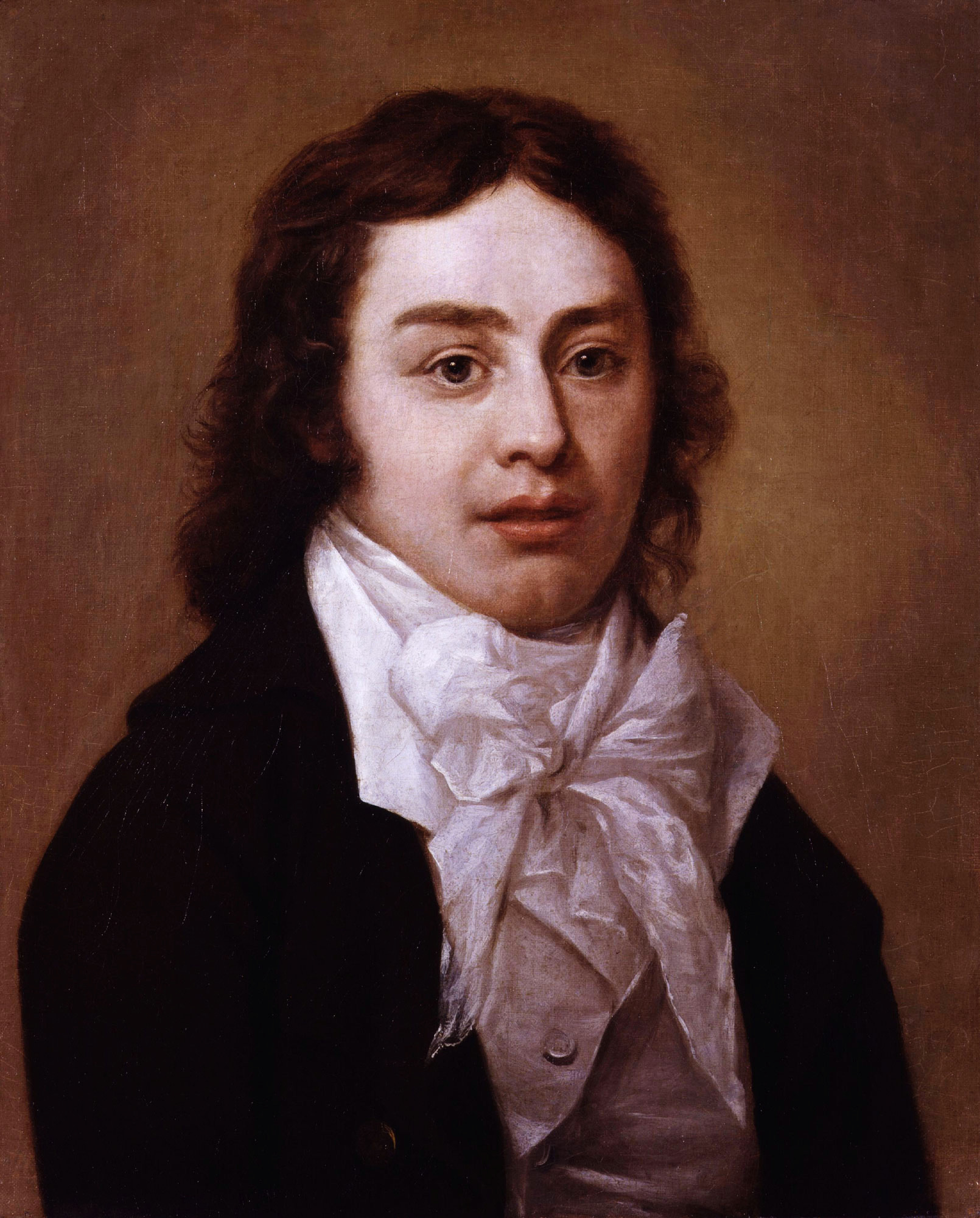
Portrait of Samuel Taylor Coleridge by Peter Vandyke (1795)

In one of a series of autobiographical letters written to Thomas Poole, Coleridge wrote: "At six years old I remember to have read Belisarius, Robinson Crusoe, and Philip Quarll – and then I found the Arabian Nights' Entertainments – one tale of which (the tale of a man who was compelled to seek for a pure virgin) made so deep an impression on me (I had read it in the evening while my mother was mending stockings) that I was haunted by spectres whenever I was in the dark – and I distinctly remember the anxious and fearful eagerness with which I used to watch the window in which the books lay – and whenever the sun lay upon them, I would seize it, carry it by the wall, and bask, and read."

Coleridge seems to have appreciated his teacher, as he wrote in recollections of his school days in Biographia Literaria:

I enjoyed the inestimable advantage of a very sensible, though at the same time, a very severe master...At the same time that we were studying the Greek Tragic Poets, he made us read Shakespeare and Milton as lessons: and they were the lessons too, which required most time and trouble to bring up, so as to escape his censure. I learnt from him, that Poetry, even that of the loftiest, and, seemingly, that of the wildest odes, had a logic of its own, as severe as that of science; and more difficult, because more subtle, more complex, and dependent on more, and more fugitive causes...In our own English compositions (at least for the last three years of our school education) he showed no mercy to phrase, metaphor, or image, unsupported by a sound sense, or where the same sense might have been conveyed with equal force and dignity in plainer words...In fancy I can almost hear him now, exclaiming Harp? Harp? Lyre? Pen and ink, boy, you mean! Muse, boy, Muse? your Nurse's daughter, you mean! Pierian spring? Oh aye! the cloister-pump, I suppose!...Be this as it may, there was one custom of our master's, which I cannot pass over in silence, because I think it ...worthy of imitation. He would often permit our theme exercises...to accumulate, till each lad had four or five to be looked over. Then placing the whole number abreast on his desk, he would ask the writer, why this or that sentence might not have found as appropriate a place under this or that other thesis: and if no satisfying answer could be returned, and two faults of the same kind were found in one exercise, the irrevocable verdict followed, the exercise was torn up, and another on the same subject to be produced, in addition to the tasks of the day.

He later wrote of his loneliness at school in the poem Frost at Midnight: "With unclosed lids, already had I dreamt/Of my sweet birth-place."

From 1791 until 1794, Coleridge attended Jesus College, Cambridge. In 1792, he won the Browne Medal for an ode he wrote attacking the Atlantic slave trade. On 2 December 1793 he left the college and enlisted in the British Army's 15th Light Dragoons at the rank of private. Enlisting under the false name "Silas Tomkyn Comberbache", he joined the military perhaps because of debt accrued from studying at Jesus College or because the girl that he loved, Mary Evans, had rejected him. His brothers arranged for his discharge from the Army in April 1794 under the reason of "insanity" and he was readmitted to Jesus College, though he would never receive a degree from the university.

== Pantisocracy and marriage ==
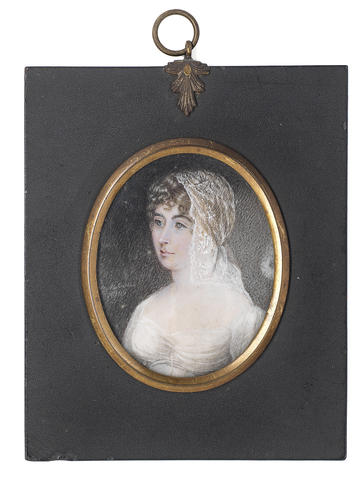
Sarah Coleridge, by Mary Matilda Betham, 1809

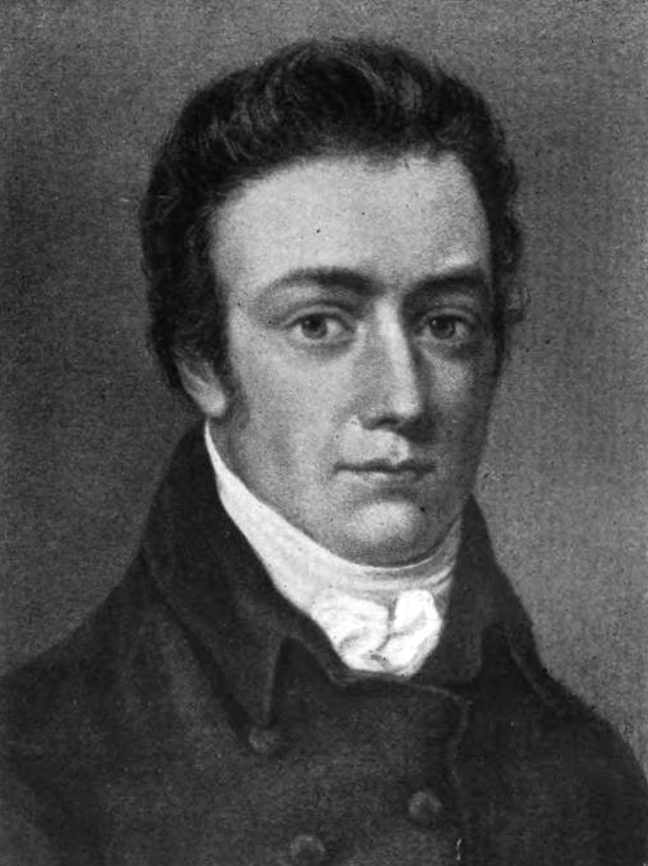
Portrait of Coleridge, from The Rime of the Ancient Mariner and The Vision of Sir Launfal

=== Cambridge and Somerset ===
At Jesus College, Coleridge was introduced to political and theological ideas then considered radical, including those of the poet Robert Southey with whom he collaborated on the play The Fall of Robespierre. Coleridge joined Southey in a plan, later abandoned, to found a utopian commune-like society, called Pantisocracy, in the wilderness of Pennsylvania.

In 1795, the two friends became engaged to sisters Sara and Edith Fricker, with Sara becoming the subject of Coleridge's poem The Eolian Harp. They wed that year in St Mary Redcliffe, Bristol, but Coleridge's marriage with Sara proved unhappy. By 1804, they were separated. When Coleridge wrote to his brother he laid all the blame on Sara: "The few friends who have been Witnesses of my domestic life have long advised separation as the necessary condition of everything desirable for me..." Subsequent biographers have not agreed with Coleridge's negative view of the wife he called his 'Sally Pally' when he first married her.

A third sister, Mary, had already married a third poet, Robert Lovell, and both became partners in Pantisocracy. Lovell also introduced Coleridge and Southey to their future patron Joseph Cottle, but died of a fever in April 1796. Coleridge was with him at his death.

In 1796, he released his first volume of poems entitled Poems on Various Subjects, which also included four poems by Charles Lamb as well as a collaboration with Robert Southey and a work suggested by his and Lamb's schoolfriend Robert Favell. Among the poems were Religious Musings, "Monody on the Death of Chatterton" and an early version of "The Eolian Harp" entitled Effusion 35. A second edition was printed in 1797, this time including an appendix of works by Lamb and Charles Lloyd, a young poet to whom Coleridge had become a private tutor.

In 1796, he also privately printed Sonnets from Various Authors, including sonnets by Lamb, Lloyd, Southey and himself as well as older poets such as William Lisle Bowles.

Coleridge made plans to establish a journal, The Watchman, to be printed every eight days to avoid a weekly newspaper tax. The first issue of the short-lived journal was published in March 1796. It had ceased publication by May of that year.

The years 1797 and 1798, during which he lived in what is now known as Coleridge Cottage, in Nether Stowey, Somerset, were among the most fruitful of Coleridge's life. In 1795, Coleridge met poet William Wordsworth and his sister Dorothy. (Wordsworth, having visited him and being enchanted by the surroundings, rented Alfoxton Park, a little over three miles [5 km] away.) Besides The Rime of the Ancient Mariner, Coleridge composed the symbolic poem "Kubla Khan", written—Coleridge claimed—as a result of an opium dream, in "a kind of a reverie"; and the first part of the narrative poem Christabel. The writing of "Kubla Khan", written about the Mongol emperor Kublai Khan and his legendary palace at Xanadu, was said to have been interrupted by the arrival of "a person on business from Porlock" – an event that has been embellished upon in such varied contexts as science fiction and Nabokov's Lolita. During this period, he also produced his much-praised "conversation poems" "This Lime-Tree Bower My Prison", Frost at Midnight, and The Nightingale.

In 1798, Coleridge and Wordsworth published a joint volume of poetry, Lyrical Ballads, which proved to be the starting point for the English romantic age. Wordsworth may have contributed more poems, but the real star of the collection was Coleridge's first version of The Rime of the Ancient Mariner. It was the longest work and drew more praise and attention than anything else in the volume. In the spring Coleridge temporarily took over for Rev. Joshua Toulmin at Taunton's Mary Street Unitarian Chapel while Rev. Toulmin grieved over the drowning death of his daughter Jane. Poetically commenting on Toulmin's strength, Coleridge wrote in a 1798 letter to John Prior Estlin, "I walked into Taunton (eleven miles) and back again, and performed the divine services for Dr. Toulmin. I suppose you must have heard that his daughter, (Jane, on 15 April 1798) in a melancholy derangement, suffered herself to be swallowed up by the tide on the sea-coast between Sidmouth and Bere [sic] (Beer). These events cut cruelly into the hearts of old men: but the good Dr. Toulmin bears it like the true practical Christian, – there is indeed a tear in his eye, but that eye is lifted up to the Heavenly Father."

=== West Midlands and the North ===
Coleridge also worked briefly in Shropshire, where he came in December 1797 as locum to its local Unitarian minister, Dr. Rowe, in their church in the High Street at Shrewsbury. He is said to have read his Rime of the Ancient Mariner at a literary evening in Mardol. He was then contemplating a career in the ministry, and gave a probationary sermon in High Street church on Sunday, 14 January 1798. William Hazlitt, a Unitarian minister's son, was in the congregation, having walked from Wem to hear him. Coleridge later visited Hazlitt and his father at Wem but within a day or two of preaching he received a letter from Josiah Wedgwood II, who had offered to help him out of financial difficulties with an annuity of £150 (approximately £13,000 in today's money) per year on condition he give up his ministerial career. Coleridge accepted this, to the disappointment of Hazlitt who had hoped to have him as a neighbour in Shropshire.

From 16 September 1798, Coleridge and the Wordsworths left for a stay in Germany; Coleridge soon went his own way and spent much of his time in university towns. In February 1799 he enrolled at the University of Göttingen, where he attended lectures by Johann Friedrich Blumenbach and Johann Gottfried Eichhorn. During this period, he became interested in German philosophy, especially the transcendental idealism and critical philosophy of Immanuel Kant, and in the literary criticism of the 18th-century dramatist Gotthold Lessing. Coleridge studied German and, after his return to England, translated the dramatic trilogy Wallenstein by the German Classical poet Friedrich Schiller into English. He continued to pioneer these ideas through his own critical writings for the rest of his life (sometimes without attribution), although they were unfamiliar and difficult for a culture dominated by empiricism.

In 1799, Coleridge and the Wordsworths stayed at Thomas Hutchinson's farm on the River Tees at Sockburn, near Darlington.

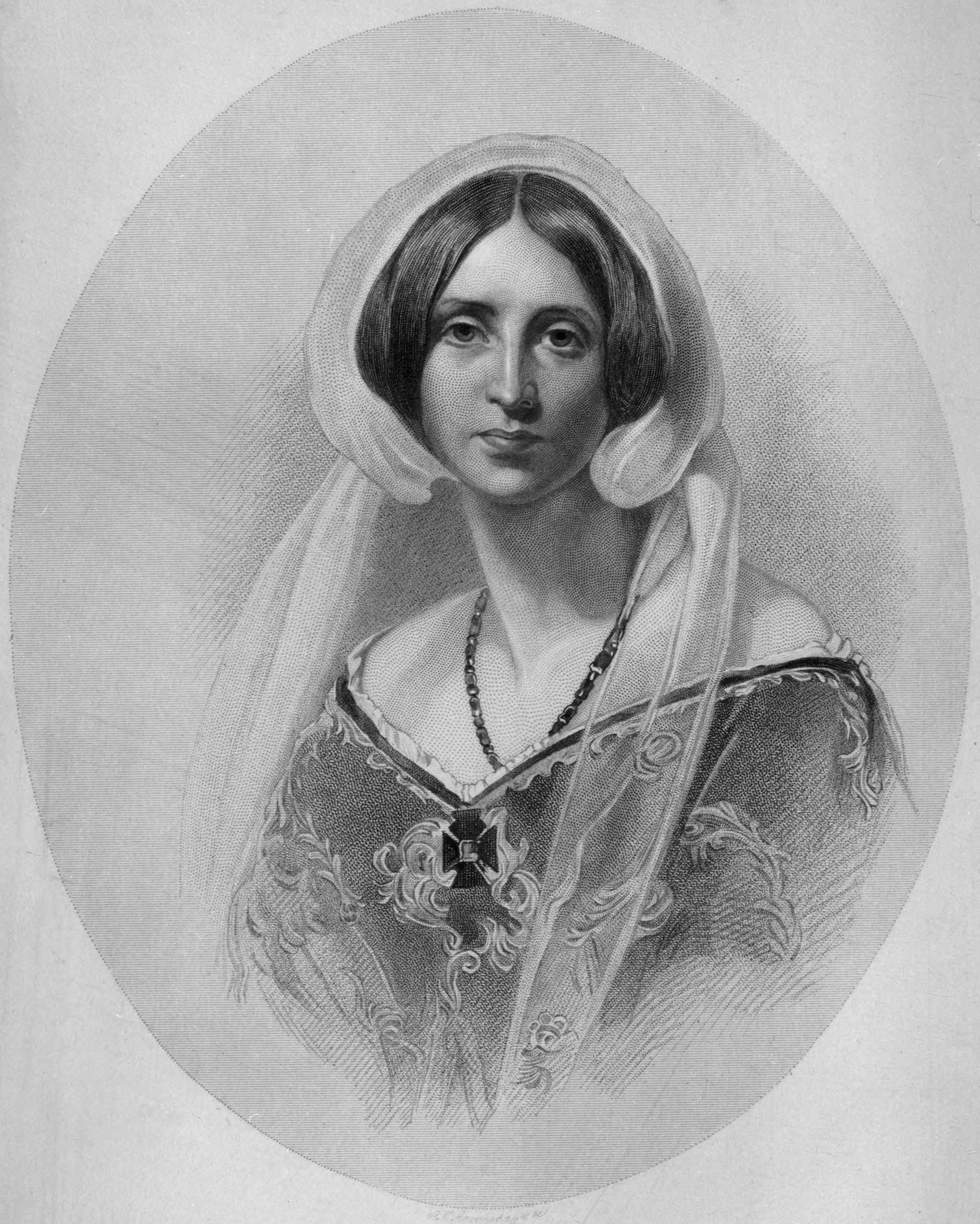
Samuel Taylor Coleridge's daughter Sara Coleridge, 1830. Portrait by Richard James Lane

It was at Sockburn that Coleridge wrote his ballad-poem Love, addressed to Sara Hutchinson. The knight mentioned is the mailed figure on the Conyers tomb in ruined Sockburn church. The figure has a wyvern at his feet, a reference to the Sockburn Worm slain by Sir John Conyers (and a possible source for Lewis Carroll's "Jabberwocky"). (Note: Old Sockburn church: "The stone effigy of a knight, four brasses and some grave-covers occupy their original positions in the chapel. The effigy belongs apparently to the middle of the 13th century (fn. 130), and is represented in a suit of mail with sleeveless surcoat. The head rests on a square cushion and the feet on a lion and wyvern in combat.") (Note: LOVE (1798–1799) "She leant against the armed man, / The statue of the armed knight") The worm was supposedly buried under the rock in the nearby pasture; this was the "greystone" of Coleridge's first draft, later transformed into a "mount". The poem was a direct inspiration for John Keats' famous poem "La Belle Dame sans Merci".

Coleridge's early intellectual debts, besides German idealists like Kant and critics like Lessing, were first to William Godwin's Political Justice, especially during his Pantisocratic period, and to David Hartley's Observations on Man, which is the source of the psychology which is found in Frost at Midnight. Hartley argued that one becomes aware of sensory events as impressions, and that "ideas" are derived by noticing similarities and differences between impressions and then by naming them. Connections resulting from the coincidence of impressions create linkages, so that the occurrence of one impression triggers those links and calls up the memory of those ideas with which it is associated (See Dorothy Emmet, "Coleridge and Philosophy").

Coleridge was critical of the literary taste of his contemporaries, and a literary conservative insofar as he was afraid that the lack of taste in the ever growing masses of literate people would mean a continued desecration of literature.

In 1800, he returned to England and shortly thereafter settled with his family and friends in Greta Hall at Keswick in the Lake District of Cumberland to be near Grasmere, where Wordsworth had moved. He stayed with the Wordsworths for eighteen months, but was a difficult houseguest, as his dependency on laudanum grew and his frequent nightmares would wake the children. He was also a fussy eater, to the frustration of Dorothy Wordsworth, who had to cook. For example, not content with salt, Coleridge sprinkled cayenne pepper on his eggs, which he ate from a teacup. His marital problems, nightmares, illnesses, increased opium dependency, tensions with Wordsworth, and a lack of confidence in his poetic powers fuelled the composition of "Dejection: An Ode" and an intensification of his philosophical studies.

In 1802, Coleridge took a nine-day walking holiday in the Lake District fells. Coleridge is credited with the first recorded descent of Scafell to Mickledore via Broad Stand, although this may have been more due to his getting lost than a purposeful new route.

== Later life and increasing drug use ==
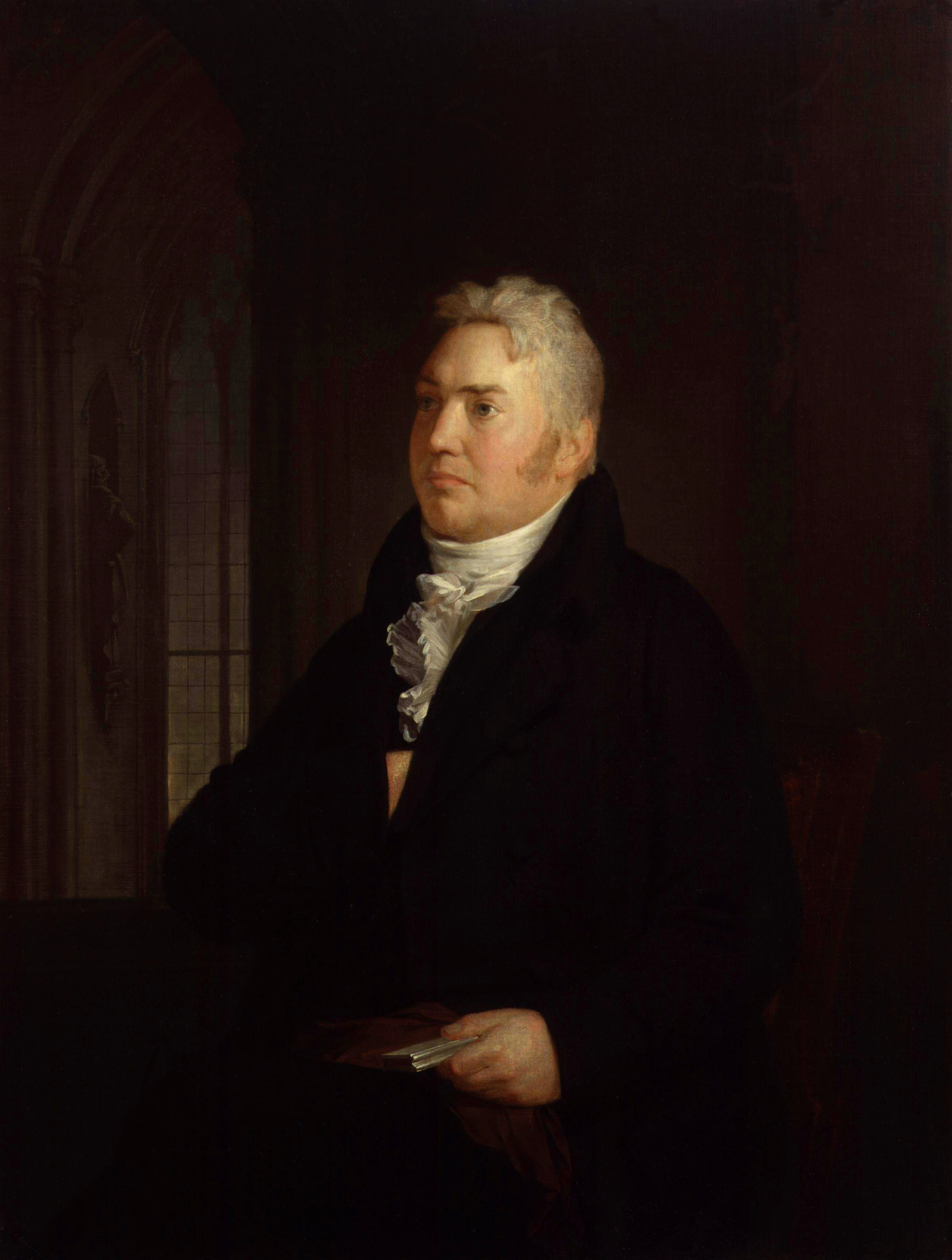
Coleridge at age 42, portrait by Washington Allston

=== Travel and The Friend ===
In 1804, he travelled to Sicily and Malta, working for a time as Acting Public Secretary of Malta under the Civil Commissioner, Alexander Ball, a task he performed successfully. He lived in San Anton Palace in the village of Attard. He gave this up and returned to England in 1806. Dorothy Wordsworth was shocked at his condition upon his return.

From 1807 to 1808, Coleridge returned to Malta and then travelled in Sicily and mainland Italy, in the hope that leaving Britain's damp climate would improve his health and thus enable him to reduce his consumption of opium. Thomas De Quincey alleges in his Recollections of the Lakes and the Lake Poets that it was during this period that Coleridge became a full-blown opium addict, using the drug as a substitute for the lost vigour and creativity of his youth. It has been suggested that this reflects De Quincey's own experiences more than Coleridge's.

His opium addiction (he was using as much as two quarts of laudanum a week) now began to take over his life: he separated from his wife Sara in 1808, quarrelled with Wordsworth in 1810, lost part of his annuity in 1811, and put himself under the care of Dr. Daniel in 1814. His addiction caused severe constipation, which required regular and humiliating enemas.

In 1809, Coleridge made his second attempt to become a newspaper publisher with the publication of the journal entitled The Friend. It was a weekly publication that, in Coleridge's typically ambitious style, was written, edited, and published almost entirely single-handedly. Given that Coleridge tended to be highly disorganised and had no head for business, the publication was probably doomed from the start. Coleridge financed the journal by selling over five hundred subscriptions, over two dozen of which were sold to members of Parliament, but in late 1809, publication was crippled by a financial crisis and Coleridge was obliged to approach "Conversation Sharp", Tom Poole and one or two other wealthy friends for an emergency loan to continue. The Friend was an eclectic publication that drew upon every corner of Coleridge's remarkably diverse knowledge of law, philosophy, morals, politics, history, and literary criticism.

Although it was often turgid, rambling, and inaccessible to most readers, it ran for 27 issues (Note: Issue 27 states "(To be concluded in the next Number)" at the end, but no further issues were published.) and was republished in book form a number of times. A revised and expanded edition of The Friend, with added philosophical content including his "Essays on the Principles of Method" was published in 1818; it became a highly influential work and its effect was felt on writers and philosophers from John Stuart Mill to Ralph Waldo Emerson.

=== London: final years and death ===
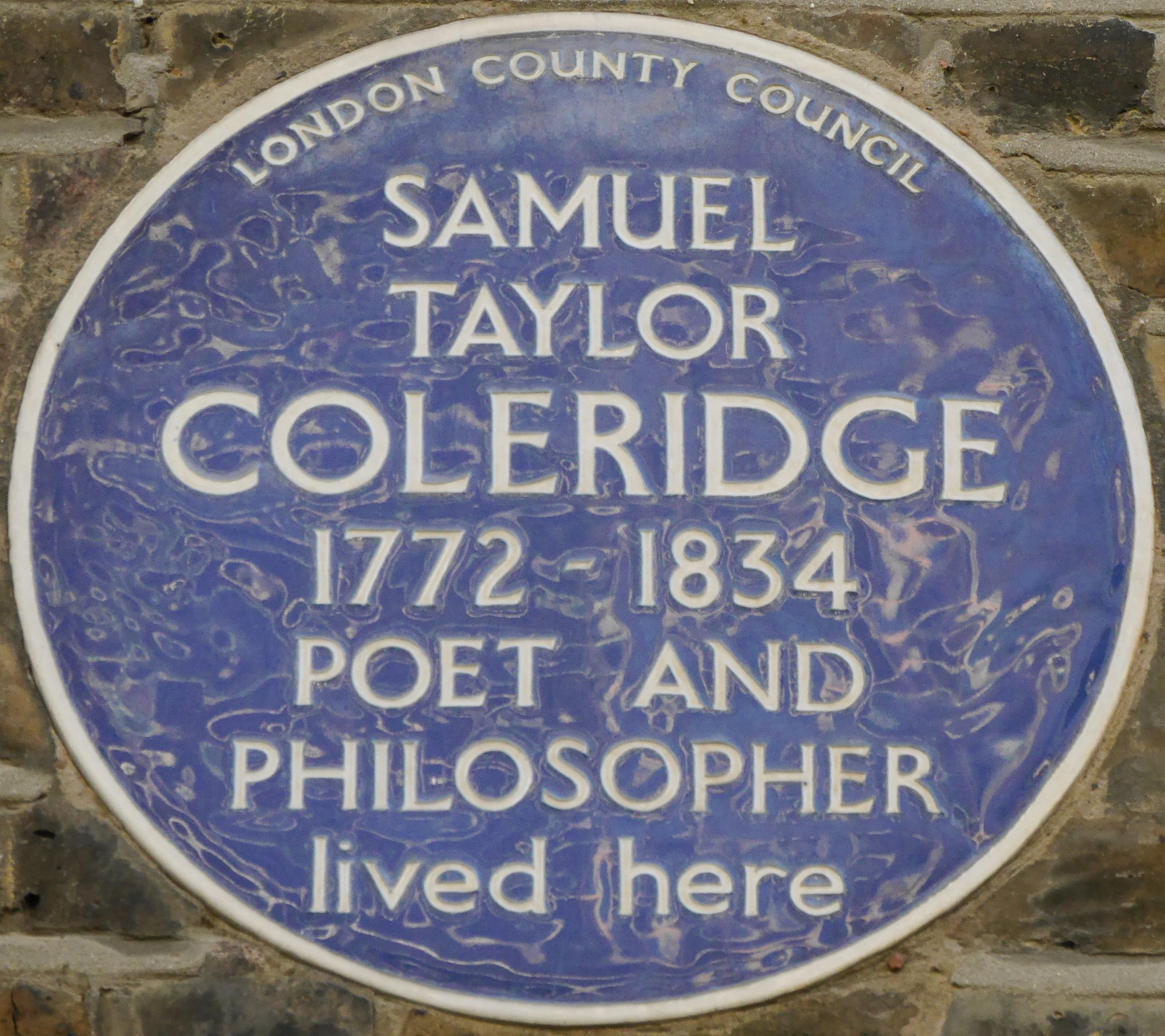
Blue plaque, 7 Addison Bridge Place, West Kensington, London

From 1810 to 1820, Coleridge gave a series of lectures in London and Bristol – those on Shakespeare renewed interest in the playwright as a model for contemporary writers. Much of Coleridge's reputation as a literary critic is founded on the lectures that he undertook in the winter of 1810–11, which were sponsored by the Philosophical Institution and given at Scot's Corporation Hall off Fetter Lane, Fleet Street. These lectures were heralded in the prospectus as "A Course of Lectures on Shakespeare and Milton, in Illustration of the Principles of Poetry." Coleridge's ill-health, opium-addiction problems, and somewhat unstable personality meant that all his lectures were plagued with problems of delays and a general irregularity of quality from one lecture to the next.

As a result of these factors, Coleridge often failed to prepare anything but the loosest set of notes for his lectures and regularly entered into extremely long digressions which his audiences found difficult to follow. However, it was the lecture on Hamlet given on 2 January 1812 that was considered the best and has influenced Hamlet studies ever since. Before Coleridge, Hamlet was often denigrated and belittled by critics from Voltaire to Dr. Johnson. Coleridge rescued the play's reputation, and his thoughts on it are often still published as supplements to the text.

In 1812, he allowed Robert Southey to make use of extracts from his vast number of private notebooks in their collaboration Omniana; Or, Horae Otiosiores.

In August 1814, Coleridge was approached by John Murray, Lord Byron's publisher, about the possibility of translating Goethe's classic Faust (1808). Coleridge was regarded by many as the greatest living writer on the demonic and he accepted the commission, only to abandon work on it after six weeks. Until recently, scholars were in agreement that Coleridge never returned to the project, despite Goethe's own belief in the 1820s that he had in fact completed a long translation of the work. In September 2007, Oxford University Press sparked a heated scholarly controversy by publishing an English translation of Goethe's work that purported to be Coleridge's long-lost masterpiece (the text in question first appeared anonymously in 1821).

From 1814 to 1816, Coleridge rented from a local surgeon, Mr Page, in Calne, Wiltshire. He seemed able to focus on his work and manage his addiction, drafting Biographia Literaria. A blue plaque marks the property today.

In April 1816, Coleridge, with his addiction worsening, his spirits depressed, and his family alienated, took residence in the Highgate homes, then just north of London, of the physician James Gillman, first at South Grove and later at the nearby 3, The Grove. It is unclear whether his growing use of opium (and the brandy in which it was dissolved) was a symptom or a cause of his growing depression. Gillman was partially successful in controlling the poet's addiction. Coleridge remained in Highgate for the rest of his life, and the house became a place of literary pilgrimage for writers including Thomas Carlyle and Emerson.

In Gillman's home, Coleridge finished his major prose work, the Biographia Literaria (mostly drafted in 1815, and finished in 1817), a volume composed of 23 chapters of autobiographical notes and dissertations on various subjects, including some incisive literary theory and criticism. He composed a considerable amount of poetry, of variable quality. He published other writings while he was living at the Gillman homes, notably the Lay Sermons of 1816 and 1817, Sibylline Leaves (1817), Hush (1820), Aids to Reflection (1825), and On the Constitution of the Church and State (1830). He also produced essays published shortly after his death, such as Essay on Faith (1838) and Confessions of an Inquiring Spirit (1840). A number of his followers were central to the Oxford Movement, and his religious writings profoundly shaped Anglicanism in the mid-nineteenth century.

Coleridge also worked extensively on the various manuscripts which form his Opus Maximum, a work which was in part intended as a post-Kantian work of philosophical synthesis. The work was never published in his lifetime, and has frequently been seen as evidence for his tendency to conceive grand projects which he then had difficulty in carrying through to completion. But while he frequently berated himself for his "indolence", the long list of his published works calls this myth into question. Critics are divided on whether the Opus Maximum, first published in 2002, successfully resolved the philosophical issues he had been exploring for most of his adult life.

Coleridge died in Highgate, London on 25 July 1834 as a result of heart failure compounded by an unknown lung disorder, possibly linked to his use of opium. Coleridge had spent 18 years under the roof of the Gillman family, who built an addition onto their home to accommodate the poet.

Faith may be defined as fidelity to our own being, so far as such being is not and cannot become an object of the senses; and hence, by clear inference or implication to being generally, as far as the same is not the object of the senses; and again to whatever is affirmed or understood as the condition, or concomitant, or consequence of the same. This will be best explained by an instance or example. That I am conscious of something within me peremptorily commanding me to do unto others as I would they should do unto me; in other words a categorical (that is, primary and unconditional) imperative; that the maxim (regula maxima, or supreme rule) of my actions, both inward and outward, should be such as I could, without any contradiction arising therefrom, will to be the law of all moral and rational beings. Essay on Faith

Carlyle described him at Highgate: "Coleridge sat on the brow of Highgate Hill, in those years, looking down on London and its smoke-tumult, like a sage escaped from the inanity of life's battle...The practical intellects of the world did not much heed him, or carelessly reckoned him a metaphysical dreamer: but to the rising spirits of the young generation he had this dusky sublime character; and sat there as a kind of Magus, girt in mystery and enigma; his Dodona oak-grove (Mr. Gilman's house at Highgate) whispering strange things, uncertain whether oracles or jargon."

== Remains ==
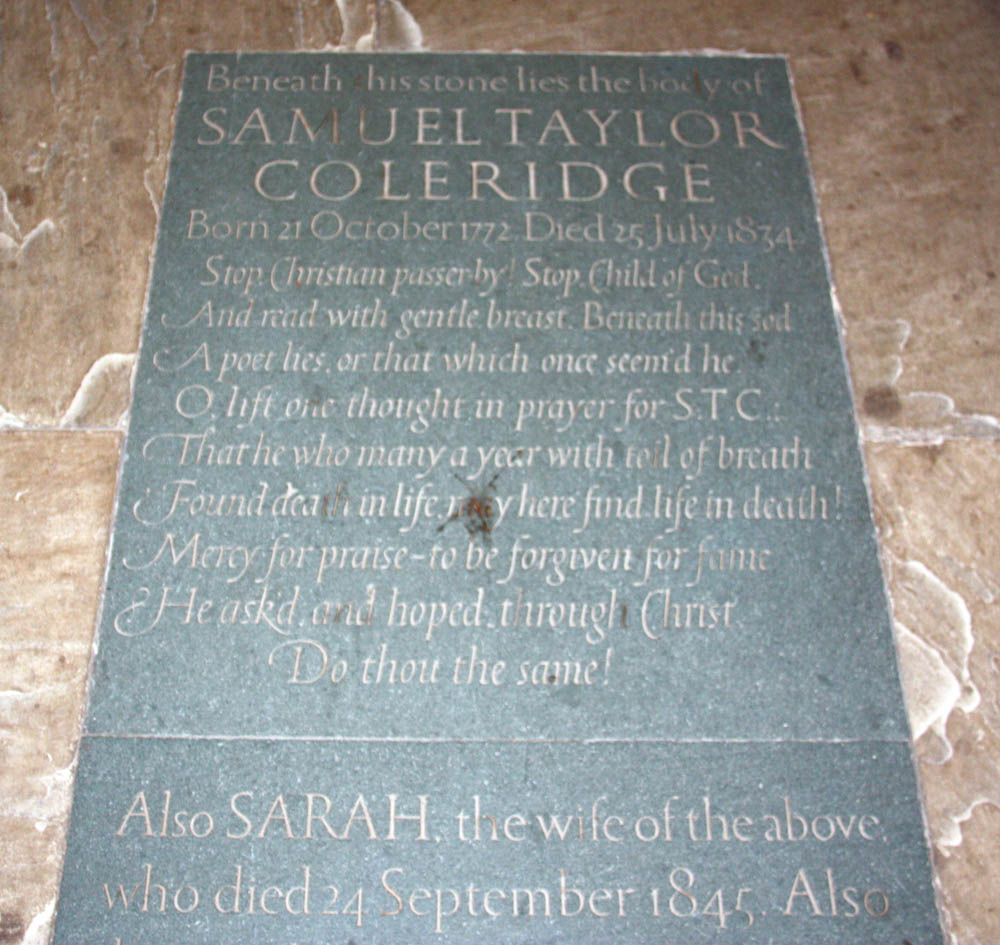
Coleridge's grave in St Michael's Church, Highgate, London

Coleridge is now buried in St Michael's Church, Highgate, London. He was originally buried at the Old Highgate Chapel, next to the main entrance of Highgate School. Coleridge could see the red door of the then new St Michael's Church from his last residence across the green, on The Grove, where he lived with a doctor he had hoped might cure him.

When it was discovered Coleridge's vault had become derelict, the coffins – Coleridge's and those of his wife Sarah, daughter Sara Coleridge, son-in-law Henry Nelson Coleridge, and grandson Herbert Coleridge, were moved to St Michael's Highgate after an international fundraising appeal in 1961.

A recent excavation revealed the coffins were not in the location most believed, the far corner of the crypt, but below a memorial slab in the nave inscribed with: "Beneath this stone lies the body of Samuel Taylor Coleridge". St Michael's plans to restore the crypt and allow public access.

== Poetry ==
Coleridge is one of the most important figures in English poetry. His poems directly and deeply influenced all the major poets of the age. He was known by his contemporaries as a meticulous craftsman who was more rigorous in his careful reworking of his poems than any other poet, and Southey and Wordsworth were dependent on his professional advice. His influence on Wordsworth is particularly important because many critics have credited Coleridge with the very idea of "Conversational Poetry". The idea of utilising common, everyday language to express profound poetic images and ideas for which Wordsworth became so famous may have originated almost entirely in Coleridge's mind. It is difficult to imagine Wordsworth's great poems, The Excursion or The Prelude, ever having been written without the direct influence of Coleridge's originality.

As important as Coleridge was to poetry as a poet, he was equally important to poetry as a critic. His philosophy of poetry, which he developed over many years, has been deeply influential in the field of literary criticism. This influence can be seen in such critics as A. O. Lovejoy and I. A. Richards.

=== The Rime of the Ancient Mariner, Christabel, and "Kubla Khan" ===
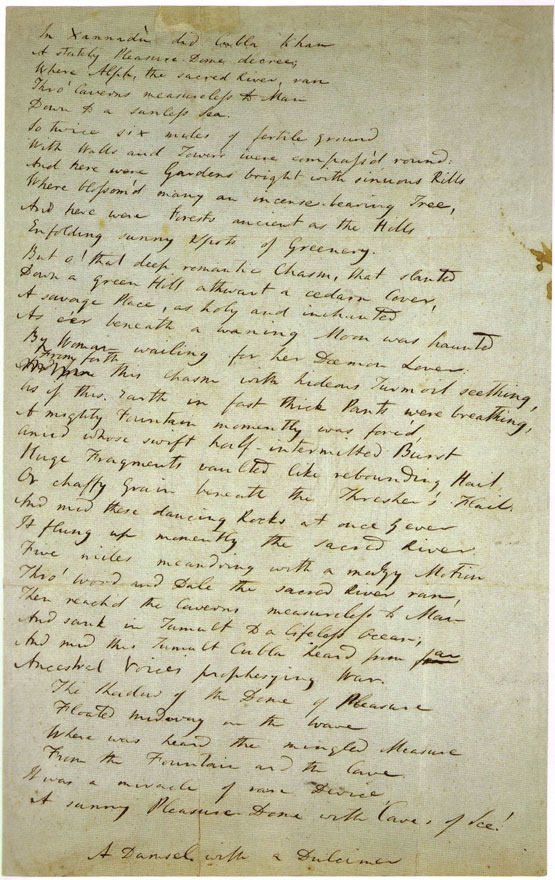
Coleridge draft of the poem "Kubla Khan"

Coleridge is arguably best known for his longer poems, particularly The Rime of the Ancient Mariner and Christabel. Even those who have never read the Rime have come under its influence: its words have given the English language the metaphor of an albatross around one's neck, the quotation of "water, water everywhere, nor any drop to drink" (almost always rendered as "but not a drop to drink"), and the phrase "a sadder and a wiser man" (usually rendered as "a sadder but wiser man"). The phrase "All creatures great and small" may have been inspired by The Rime: "He prayeth best, who loveth best;/ All things both great and small;/ For the dear God who loveth us;/ He made and loveth all." Millions more who have never read the poem nonetheless know its story thanks to the 1984 song "Rime of the Ancient Mariner" by the English heavy metal band Iron Maiden. Christabel is known for its musical rhythm, language, and its Gothic tale.

"Kubla Khan", although shorter, is also widely known. Both "Kubla Khan" and Christabel have an additional "Romantic" aura because they were never finished. Stopford Brooke characterised both poems as having no rival due to their "exquisite metrical movement" and "imaginative phrasing".

=== Conversation poems ===
- The Eolian Harp (1795)
- Reflections on Having Left a Place of Retirement (1795)
- This Lime-Tree Bower My Prison (1797)
- Frost at Midnight (1798)
- Fears in Solitude (1798)
- The Nightingale: A Conversation Poem (1798)
- "Dejection: An Ode" (1802)
- To William Wordsworth (1807)

These eight poems are now often referred to as "Conversation poems". The term was coined in 1928 by George McLean Harper, who borrowed the subtitle of The Nightingale: A Conversation Poem to describe the seven other poems as well. The poems are considered by many critics to be among Coleridge's finest verses; Harold Bloom wrote, "With Dejection, The Ancient Mariner, and "Kubla Khan", Frost at Midnight shows Coleridge at his most impressive." They are also among his most influential poems, as discussed further below.

Harper considered that the eight poems represented a form of blank verse that is "...more fluent and easy than Milton's, or any that had been written since Milton". In 2006, Robert Koelzer wrote about another aspect of this apparent "easiness", noting that Conversation poems such as "Coleridge's The Eolian Harp and The Nightingale maintain a middle register of speech, employing an idiomatic language that is capable of being construed as un-symbolic and un-musical: language that lets itself be taken as 'merely talk' rather than rapturous 'song'."

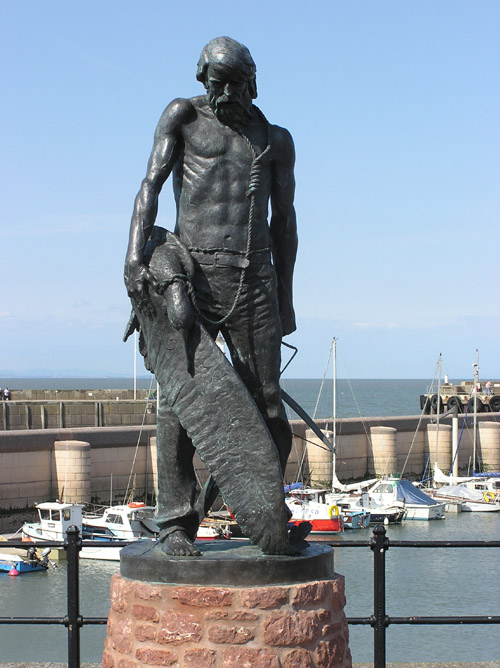
A statue of the Ancient Mariner at Watchet Harbour, Somerset, England

The last ten lines of Frost at Midnight were chosen by Harper as the "best example of the peculiar kind of blank verse Coleridge had evolved, as natural-seeming as prose, but as exquisitely artistic as the most complicated sonnet." The speaker of the poem is addressing his infant son, asleep by his side:

Therefore all seasons shall be sweet to thee,
Whether the summer clothe the general earth
With greenness, or the redbreast sit and sing
Betwixt the tufts of snow on the bare branch
Of mossy apple-tree, while the nigh thatch
Smokes in the sun-thaw; whether the eave-drops fall
Heard only in the trances of the blast,
Or if the secret ministry of frost
Shall hang them up in silent icicles,
Quietly shining to the quiet Moon.

In 1965, M. H. Abrams wrote a broad description that applies to the Conversation poems: "The speaker begins with a description of the landscape; an aspect or change of aspect in the landscape evokes a varied by integral process of memory, thought, anticipation, and feeling which remains closely intervolved with the outer scene. In the course of this meditation the lyric speaker achieves an insight, faces up to a tragic loss, comes to a moral decision, or resolves an emotional problem. Often the poem rounds itself to end where it began, at the outer scene, but with an altered mood and deepened understanding which is the result of the intervening meditation." In fact, Abrams was describing both the Conversation poems and later poems influenced by them. Abrams' essay has been called a "touchstone of literary criticism". As Paul Magnuson described it in 2002, "Abrams credited Coleridge with originating what Abrams called the 'greater Romantic lyric', a genre that began with Coleridge's 'Conversation' poems, and included Wordsworth's "Lines Written a Few Miles above Tintern Abbey", Shelley's "Stanzas Written in Dejection" and Keats's "Ode to a Nightingale", and was a major influence on more modern lyrics by Matthew Arnold, Walt Whitman, Wallace Stevens, and W. H. Auden."

== Literary criticism ==
=== Biographia Literaria ===
In addition to his poetry, Coleridge also wrote influential pieces of literary criticism including Biographia Literaria, a collection of his thoughts and opinions on literature which he published in 1817. The work delivered both biographical explanations of the author's life as well as his impressions on literature. The collection also contained an analysis of a broad range of philosophical principles of literature ranging from Aristotle to Immanuel Kant and Schelling and applied them to the poetry of peers such as William Wordsworth. (Note: See article on Mimesis) Coleridge's explanation of metaphysical principles were popular topics of discourse in academic communities throughout the 19th and 20th centuries, and T.S. Eliot stated that he believed that Coleridge was "perhaps the greatest of English critics, and in a sense the last." Eliot suggests that Coleridge displayed "natural abilities" far greater than his contemporaries, dissecting literature and applying philosophical principles of metaphysics in a way that brought the subject of his criticisms away from the text and into a world of logical analysis that mixed logical analysis and emotion. However, Eliot also criticises Coleridge for allowing his emotion to play a role in the metaphysical process, believing that critics should not have emotions that are provoked by the work being studied. Hugh Kenner in Historical Fictions, discusses Norman Fruman's Coleridge, the Damaged Archangel and suggests that the term "criticism" is too often applied to Biographia Literaria, which both he and Fruman describe as having failed to explain or help the reader understand works of art. To Kenner, Coleridge's attempt to discuss complex philosophical concepts without describing the rational process behind them displays a lack of critical thinking that makes the volume more of a biography than a work of criticism.

=== Coleridge and the influence of the Gothic ===
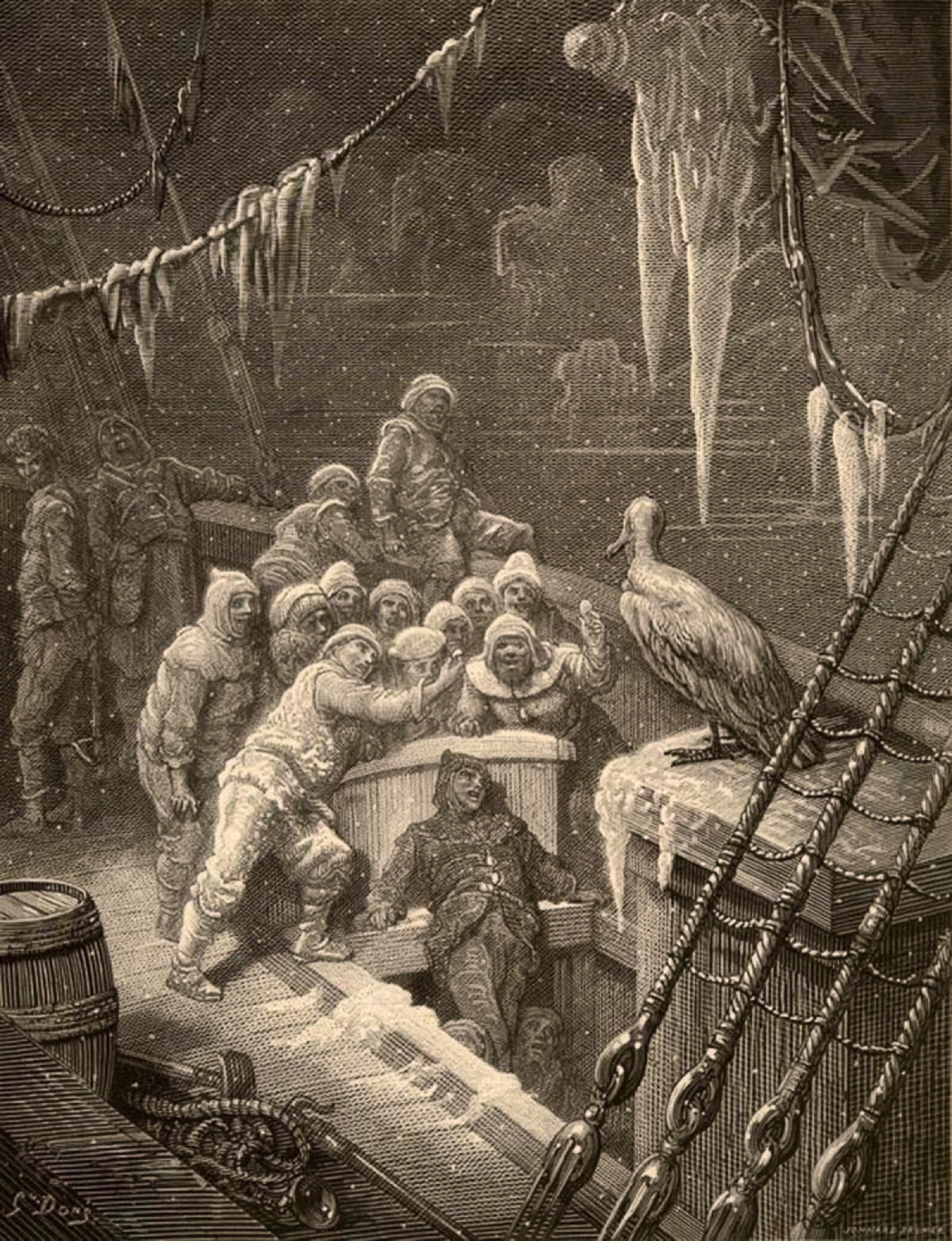
Engraving of a scene from The Rime of the Ancient Mariner. The frozen crew and the albatross by Gustave Doré (1876)

Coleridge wrote reviews of Ann Radcliffe's books and The Mad Monk, among others. He comments in his reviews: "Situations of torment, and images of naked horror, are easily conceived; and a writer in whose works they abound, deserves our gratitude almost equally with him who should drag us by way of sport through a military hospital, or force us to sit at the dissecting-table of a natural philosopher. To trace the nice boundaries, beyond which terror and sympathy are deserted by the pleasurable emotions, – to reach those limits, yet never to pass them, hic labor, hic opus est." and "The horrible and the preternatural have usually seized on the popular taste, at the rise and decline of literature. Most powerful stimulants, they can never be required except by the torpor of an unawakened, or the languor of an exhausted, appetite...We trust, however, that satiety will banish what good sense should have prevented; and that, wearied with fiends, incomprehensible characters, with shrieks, murders, and subterraneous dungeons, the public will learn, by the multitude of the manufacturers, with how little expense of thought or imagination this species of composition is manufactured."

However, Coleridge used these elements in poems such as The Rime of the Ancient Mariner (1798), Christabel and Kubla Khan (published in 1816, but known in manuscript form before then) and certainly influenced other poets and writers of the time. Poems like these both drew inspiration from and helped to inflame the craze for Gothic romance. Coleridge also made considerable use of Gothic elements in his commercially successful play Remorse.

Mary Shelley, who knew Coleridge well, mentions The Rime of the Ancient Mariner twice directly in Frankenstein, and some of the descriptions in the novel echo it indirectly. Although William Godwin, her father, disagreed with Coleridge on some important issues, he respected his opinions and Coleridge often visited the Godwins. Mary Shelley later recalled hiding behind the sofa and hearing his voice chanting The Rime of the Ancient Mariner.

C. S. Lewis also makes mention of his name in The Screwtape Letters (as a poor example of prayer, in which the devils should encourage).

== Religious beliefs ==
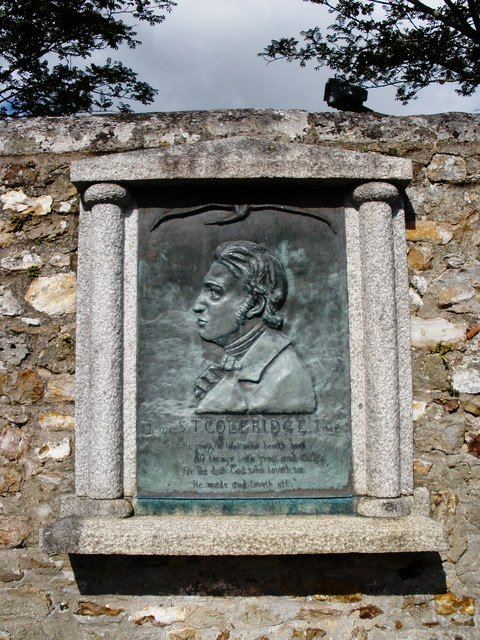
Plaque commemorating Coleridge at St Mary's Church, Ottery St Mary

Coleridge's father was an Anglican vicar; although Coleridge worked as a Unitarian preacher from 1796 to 1797, he eventually returned to the Church of England in 1814. His most noteworthy writings on religion are Lay Sermons (1817), Aids to Reflection (1825) and The Constitution of Church and State (1830).

=== Theological legacy ===
Despite being mostly remembered today for his poetry and literary criticism, Coleridge was also a theologian. His writings include discussions of the status of scripture, the doctrines of the Fall, justification and sanctification, and the personality and infinity of God. A major figure in the Anglican theology of his day, his writings are still regularly referred to by contemporary Anglican theologians. F. D. Maurice, F. J. A. Hort, F. W. Robertson, B. F. Westcott, John Oman and Thomas Erskine (once called the "Scottish Coleridge") were all influenced by him.

== Political thinking ==
Coleridge was also a political thinker. Early in his life, he was a political radical and an enthusiast for the French Revolution. However, he subsequently developed a more conservative view of society, somewhat in the manner of Edmund Burke. He was critical of the French Constitution of 1799, adopted following the Coup of 18 Brumaire, which he regarded as oligarchic.

Although seen as cowardly treachery by the next generation of Romantic poets, Coleridge's later thought became a fruitful source for the evolving radicalism of J. S. Mill. Mill found three aspects of Coleridge's thought especially illuminating:

1. First, there was Coleridge's insistence on what he called "the Idea" behind an institution – its social function, in later terminology – as opposed to the possible flaws in its actual implementation. Coleridge sought to understand meaning from within a social matrix, not outside it, using an imaginative reconstruction of the past (Verstehen) or of unfamiliar systems.
2. Secondly, Coleridge explored the necessary conditions for social stability – what he termed Permanence, in counterbalance to Progress, in a polity – stressing the importance of a shared public sense of community, and national education.
3. Coleridge also usefully employed the organic metaphor of natural growth to shed light on the historical development of British history, as exemplified in the common law tradition – working his way thereby towards a sociology of jurisprudence.

Coleridge also rejected the ideas of Adam Smith and Thomas Malthus.

== Collected works ==
The current standard edition is The Collected Works of Samuel Taylor Coleridge, edited by Kathleen Coburn and many others from 1969 to 2002. This collection appeared across 16 volumes as Bollingen Series 75, published variously by Princeton University Press and Routledge & Kegan Paul. The set is broken down as follows into further parts, resulting in a total of 34 separate printed volumes:

1. Lectures 1795 on Politics and Religion (1971);
2. The Watchman (1970);
3. Essays on his Times in the Morning Post and the Courier (1978) in 3 vols;
4. The Friend (1969) in 2 vols;
5. Lectures, 1808–1819, on Literature (1987) in 2 vols;
6. Lay Sermons (1972);
7. Biographia Literaria (1983) in 2 vols;
8. Lectures 1818–1819 on the History of Philosophy (2000) in 2 vols;
9. Aids to Reflection (1993);
10. On the Constitution of the Church and State (1976);
11. Shorter Works and Fragments (1995) in 2 vols;
12. Marginalia (1980 and following) in 6 vols;
13. Logic (1981);
14. Table Talk (1990) in 2 vols;
15. Opus Maximum (2002);
16. Poetical Works (2001) in 6 vols (part 1 – Reading Edition in 2 vols; part 2 – Variorum Text in 2 vols; part 3 – Plays in 2 vols).

In addition, Coleridge's letters are available in The Collected Letters of Samuel Taylor Coleridge (1956–1971), ed. Earl Leslie Griggs, 6 vols. (Oxford: Clarendon Press).

== See also ==
- Coleridge's theory of life
- Lake Poets
- Organic form
- Romantic epistemology

== Sources and Further reading ==
- Abrams, M. H. (1965). "Structure and Style in the Greater Romantic Lyric". In Hilles, Frederick W.; Bloom, Harold (eds.). From Sensibility to Romanticism. Oxford University Press. pp. 527–8.
- Barfield, Owen. What Coleridge Thought (Middletown: Wesleyan University Press, 1971). (Extensive study of Coleridge as philosopher.)
- Barth, J. Robert. Coleridge and Christian Doctrine (Cambridge: Harvard, 1969). (Examines Coleridge's theology.)
- Barth, J. Robert. The Symbolic Imagination (New York: Fordham, 2001). (Examines Coleridge's concept of "symbol")
- Bate, Walter Jackson (1968). Coleridge. The Macmillan Company. ISBN 0-8262-0713-8.
- Beckson, Karl E. (1963). Great Theories in Literary Criticism. Farrar, Straus.
- Beer, John B. Coleridge the Visionary (London: Chatto and Windus, 1970). (Places Coleridge's poems in the context of his thought.)
- Berkeley, Richard. Coleridge and the Crisis of Reason (Houndmills: Palgrave Macmillan, 2007).
- Bloom, Harold (1971). The Visionary Company: A Reading of English Romantic Poetry (Revised ed.). Cornell University Press. ISBN 978-0-8014-9117-7. (Close readings of all of the Conversation Poems)
- Bloom, Harold (2010). Samuel Taylor Coleridge. ISBN 9781604138092.
- Boulger, J. D. Twentieth Century Interpretations of The Rime of the Ancient Mariner (Englewood Cliffs NJ: Prentice Hall, 1969). (Contains 20th-century readings of the 'Rime', including Robert Penn Warren, Humphrey House.)
- Cheyne, Peter. Coleridge's Contemplative Philosophy (Oxford: Oxford University Press, 2020).
- Class, Monika. Coleridge and the Kantian Ideas in England, 1796–1817 (London: Bloomsbury, 2012).
- Coffman, Ralph J. “The Working Library of Samuel Taylor Coleridge.” The Journal of Library History. 21, no. 2 (1986): 277–299.
- Cutsinger, James S. The Form of Transformed Vision (Macon GA: Mercer, 1987). (Argues that Coleridge wants to transform his reader's consciousness, to see nature as a living presence.)
- Eliot, T. S. (1956). "The Perfect Critic". Selected Prose of T.S. Eliot. Harcourt. (1975 edition ISBN 978-0-15-180702-4).
- Engell, James. The Creative Imagination (Cambridge: Harvard, 1981). (Surveys the various German theories of imagination in the eighteenth century)
- Engell, James (2023). Samuel Taylor Coleridge, in Then & Now: Romantic-Era Poets in the Encyclopedia Britannica, 1910-1911
- Fruman, Norman (1972). Coleridge, the Damaged Archangel. London: Allen & Unwin. (Examines Coleridge's plagiarisms, taking a critical view.)
- Harper, George McLean (1969) [1928]. "Coleridge's Conversation Poems". Spirit of Delight. Ayer Publishing. ISBN 978-0-8369-0016-3. "The Poems of Friendship make yet another claim on our attention: they are among the supreme examples of a peculiar kind of poetry. Others not unlike them, though not surpassing them, are Ovid's `Cum subit illius tristissima noctis imago,' and several of the Canti of Leopardi."
- Holmes, Richard (1982). Coleridge. Past Masters. Oxford University Press. ISBN 0-19-287592-2.
- Hough, Barry, and Davis, Howard. Coleridge's Laws: A Study of Coleridge in Malta (Cambridge: Open Book Publishers, 2010). ISBN 9781906924126.
- Kenner, Hugh (1995). "Coleridge". Historical Fictions. University of Georgia Press. ISBN 0-86547-424-9.
- Koelzer, Robert (Spring 2006). "Abrams Among the Nightingales: Revisiting the Greater Romantic Lyric". The Wordsworth Circle. 37 (2): 67–71. doi:10.1086/TWC24044130. (Detailed, recent discussion of the Conversation Poems.)
- Leadbetter, Gregory. Coleridge and the Daemonic Imagination (Houndmills: Palgrave Macmillan, 2011).
- Lefebure, Molly (1987). The Bondage of Love: a life of Mrs Samuel Taylor Coleridge (Repr., 1. American ed.). New York: Norton. ISBN 9780393024432.
- Lefebure, Molly (2013). Private Lives of the Ancient Mariner: Coleridge and his children. Cambridge: Lutterworth Press. ISBN 071889300X.
- Lowes, John Livingston. The Road to Xanadu (London: Constable, 1930). (Examines sources for Coleridge's poetry).
- Magnuson, Paul. Coleridge and Wordsworth: A Lyrical Dialogue (Princeton: Princeton UP, 1988). (A 'dialogical' reading of Coleridge and Wordsworth.)
- Magnuson, Paul (2002). "The 'Conversation' poems". In Newlyn, Lucy (ed.). The Cambridge Companion to Coleridge. Cambridge University Press. pp. 32–44. ISBN 0-521-65909-4.
- McFarland, Thomas. Coleridge and the Pantheist Tradition (Oxford: OUP, 1969). (Examines the influence of German philosophy on Coleridge, with particular reference to pantheism)
- Modiano, Raimonda. Coleridge and the Concept of Nature (London: Macmillan, 1985). (Examines the influence of German philosophy on Coleridge, with particular reference to nature)
- Morley, Henry (1884). Table Talk of Samuel Taylor Coleridge and The Rime of the Ancient Mariner, Christabel, &c. New York: Routledge.
- Muirhead, John H. Coleridge as Philosopher (London: George Allen and Unwin, 1930). (Examines Coleridge's philosophical texts)
- Murray, Chris. Tragic Coleridge (Farnham: Ashgate, 2013).link
- "Parishes: Sockburn", A History of the County of York North Riding, vol. 1, London: Victoria County History, pp. 449–454
- Parker, Reeve, Romantic Tragedies (Cambridge: CUP, 2011).
- Perkins, Mary Anne. Coleridge's Philosophy: The Logos as Unifying Principle (Oxford: OUP, 1994). (Draws the various strands of Coleridge's theology and philosophy together under the concept of the 'Logos'.)
- Perry, Seamus. Coleridge and the Uses of Division (Oxford: OUP, 1999). (Brings out the play of language in Coleridge's notebooks.)
- Radley, Virginia L. (1966). Samuel Taylor Coleridge. Twayne Publishers, Inc. ISBN 0-8057-1100-7.
- Reid, Nicholas. Coleridge, Form and Symbol: Or the Ascertaining Vision (Aldershot: Ashgate, 2006). (Argues for the importance of Schelling as a source for Coleridge's philosophical texts).
- Richards, I. A. Coleridge on Imagination (London: Kegan Paul, 1934). (Examines Coleridge's concept of the imagination)
- Richardson, Alan. British Romanticism and the Science of the Mind (Cambridge: CUP, 2001). (Examines the sources for Coleridge's interest in psychology.)
- Riem, Natale Antonella. The One Life. Coleridge and Hinduism (Jaipur-New Delhi: Rawat, 2005).
- Shaffer, Elinor S. Kubla Khan and the Fall of Jerusalem (Cambridge: CUP, 1975). (A broadly structuralist reading of Coleridge's poetical sources.)
- Stockitt, Robin. Imagination and the Playfulness of God: The Theological Implications of Samuel Taylor Coleridge's Definition of the Human Imagination (Eugene, OR, 2011) (Distinguished Dissertations in Christian Theology).
- Toor, Kiran. Coleridge's Chrysopoetics: Alchemy, Authorship and Imagination (Newcastle: Cambridge Scholars, 2011).
- Vallins, David. Coleridge and the Psychology of Romanticism: Feeling and Thought (London: Macmillan, 2000). (Examines Coleridge's psychology.)
- Wheeler, K.M. Sources, Processes and Methods in Coleridge's Biographia Literaria (Cambridge: Cambridge UP, 1980). (Examines the idea of the active reader in Coleridge.)
- Woudenberg, Maximiliaan van. Coleridge and Cosmopolitan Intellectualism 1794–1804. The Legacy of Göttingen University (London: Routledge, 2018).
- Wright, Luke S. H., Samuel Taylor Coleridge and the Anglican Church (Notre Dame: Notre Dame University Press, 2010).
