= Poems on Various Subjects =

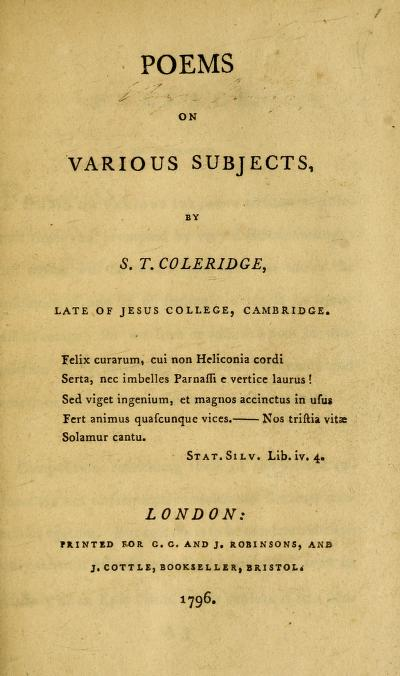

Poems on Various Subjects (1796) was the first collection by Samuel Taylor Coleridge, including also a few sonnets by Charles Lamb. A second edition in 1797 added many more poems by Lamb and by Charles Lloyd, and a third edition appeared in 1803 with Coleridge's works only. All three editions included poems in Coleridge's early Miltonic style, such as his Religious Musings and Monody on the Death of Chatterton, alongside lyrics and some of his first conversation poems, such as The Eolian Harp, in a style suggested by the works of William Cowper. The book was on the whole well received by reviewers; modern critics value it more for its shorter and lighter poems than for its formal set-pieces.

== Contents ==
=== 1796 edition ===
Four sonnets are signed "C. L.", to indicate that they are by Charles Lamb.

- "Monody on the Death of Chatterton"
- "To the Rev. W. J. H."
- "Songs of the Pixies"
- "Lines on the Man of Ross"
- "Lines to a Beautiful Spring"
- "Epitaph on an Infant"
- "Lines on a Friend"
- "To a Young Lady with a Poem"
- "Absence, a Farewell Ode"
- "Effusion I, to Bowles"
- "Effusion II, to Burke"
- "Effusion III, to Mercy"
- "Effusion IV, to Priestley"
- "Effusion V, to Erskine"
- "Effusion VI, to Sheridan"
- "Effusion VII, to Siddons" [probably a collaboration by Coleridge and Lamb]
- "Effusion VIII, to Kosciusco"
- "Effusion IX, to Fayette"
- "Effusion X, to Earl Stanhope"
- "Effusion XI" [by Lamb]
- "Effusion XII" [by Lamb]
- "Effusion XIII, Written at Midnight" [by Lamb]
- "Effusion XIV" [by Coleridge and Lamb]
- "Effusion XV"
- "Effusion XVI, to an Old Man"
- "Effusion XVII, to Genevieve"
- "Effusion XVIII, to the Autumnal Moon"
- "Effusion XIX, to My Own Heart"
- "Effusion XX, to the Author of The Robbers"
- "Effusion XXI, on Brockley Coomb"
- "Effusion XXII, to a Friend with an Unfinished Poem"
- "Effusion XXIII, to the Nightingale"
- "Effusion XXIV, in the Manner of Spenser"
- "Effusion XXV, to Domestic Peace"
- "Effusion XXVI, on a Kiss"
- "Effusion XXVII"
- "Effusion XXVIII"
- "Effusion XXIX, Imitated from Ossian"
- "Effusion XXX, Complaint of Ninathoma"
- "Effusion XXXI, from the Welch"
- "Effusion XXXII, the Sigh"
- "Effusion XXXIII, to a Young Ass"
- "Effusion XXXIV, to an Infant"
- "Effusion XXXV, Composed at Clevedon"
- "Effusion XXXVI, Written in Early Youth"
- "Epistle I, Written at Shurton Bars"
- "Epistle II, to a Friend in Answer to a Melancholy Letter"
- "Epistle III, Written After a Walk"
- "Epistle IV, to the Author of Poems Published in Bristol"
- "Epistle V, from a Young Lady"
- "Religious Musings"

=== 1797 edition ===
Poems by S. T. Coleridge
- "Dedication, to the Reverend George Coleridge"
- "Ode on the Departing Year"
- "Monody on the Death of Chatterton"
- "Songs of the Pixies"
- "The Rose"
- "The Kiss"
- "To a Young Ass"
- "Domestic Peace"
- "The Sigh"
- "Epitaph on an Infant"
- "Lines on the Man of Ross"
- "Lines to a Beautiful Spring"
- "Lines on a Friend"
- "To a Young Lady with a Poem"
- "To a Friend with an Unfinished Poem"

Sonnets Attempted in the Manner of the Rev. W. L. Bowles:

- "Sonnet I"
- "Sonnet II, on a Discovery Made Too Late"
- "Sonnet III"
- "Sonnet IV, to the River Otter"
- "Sonnet V, on Brockley Coomb"
- "Sonnet VI"
- "Sonnet VII"
- "Sonnet VIII, to the Author of The Robbers"
- "Sonnet IX, on the Birth of a Son"
- "Sonnet X, to a Friend"
- "Ode to Sara, Written at Shurton Bars"
- "Composed at Clevedon"
- "Reflections on Having Left a Place of Retirement"
- "To an Unfortunate Woman"
- "Lines on Observing a Blossom"
- "The Hour When We Shall Meet Again"
- "To C. Lloyd"
- "Religious Musings"

Poems by Charles Lloyd

- "The Melancholy Man"
- "The Maniac"
- "Lines on the Death of an Infant"
- "Sonnet I, to Craig-Millar Castle"
- "Sonnet II, to Scotland"
- "Sonnet III, to November"
- "Sonnet IV, to a Friend"
- "Sonnet V"
- "Sonnet VI"
- "Sonnet VII"
- "Sonnet VIII"
- "Sonnet IX"
- "Lines Addressed to S. T. Coleridge"
- "Christmas"

Poems on the Death of Priscilla Farmer:

- "Sonnet" [by Coleridge]
- "Dedicatory Lines"
- "Sonnet I"
- "Sonnet II"
- "Sonnet III"
- "Sonnet IV"
- "Sonnet V"
- "Sonnet VI"
- "Sonnet VII"
- "Sonnet VIII"
- "Sonnet IX"
- "Sonnet X"
- "Lines Written on a Friday"

Poems by Charles Lamb

- "Sonnet I"
- "Sonnet II"
- "Sonnet III"
- "Sonnet IV"
- "Sonnet V"
- "Sonnet VI"
- "Sonnet VII"
- "Sonnet VIII"

Fragments:

- "Childhood"
- "The Grandame"
- "The Sabbath Bell"
- "Fancy"
- "The Tomb of Douglas"
- "To Charles Lloyd"

Supplement [by Coleridge except where otherwise stated]

- "Lines Addressed to Joseph Cottle"
- "An Effusion on an Autumnal Evening"
- "In the Manner of Spencer"
- "The Composition of a Kiss"
- "To an Infant"
- "On the Christening of a Friend's Child"
- "Address to the Genius of Shakespeare" [by Lloyd]
- "Stanzas Written After a Journey into North Wales" by Lloyd
- "A Vision of Repentance" [by Lamb]

=== 1803 edition ===
- "Dedication to the Reverend George Coleridge"
- "Songs of the Pixies"
- "The Rose"
- "Kisses"
- "To Sara"
- "The Sigh"
- "Genevieve"
- "Absence, a Farewell Ode"
- "Lines to a Beautiful Spring"
- "Written in Early Youth"
- "To a Young Lady"
- "Imitated from Ossian"
- "The Complaint of Ninathoma"
- "Imitated from the Welch"
- "To a Young Ass"
- "To an Infant"
- "Epitaph on an Infant"
- "Domestic Peace"
- "Lines on the Man of Ross"
- "To a Friend, Together with an Unfinished Poem"
- "Lines on a Friend"
- "Monody on the Death of Chatterton"
- "Sonnet I"
- "Sonnet II, on a Discovery Made Too Late"
- "Sonnet III"
- "Sonnet IV, to the River Otter"
- "Sonnet V"
- "Sonnet VI"
- "Sonnet VII"
- "Sonnet VIII"
- "Sonnet IX"
- "Sonnet X"
- "Sonnet XI"
- "Sonnet XII"
- "Sonnet XIII"
- "Sonnet XIV, on Brockley Coomb"
- "Sonnet XV"
- "Sonnet XVI"
- "Sonnet XVII"
- "Sonnet XVIII, to the Autumnal Moon"
- "Sonnet XIX"
- "To the Nightingale"
- "In the Manner of Spencer"
- "To the Author of Poems Published in Bristol"
- "Ode to Sara, Written at Shurton Bars"
- "To a Friend"
- "Composed at Clevedon"
- "Reflections on Having Left a Place of Retirement"
- "To an Unfortunate Woman"
- "Lines on Observing a Blossom"
- "The Hour When We Shall Meet Again"
- "To a Friend"
- "Ode on the Departing Year"
- "Religious Musings"

== Compilation and publication ==
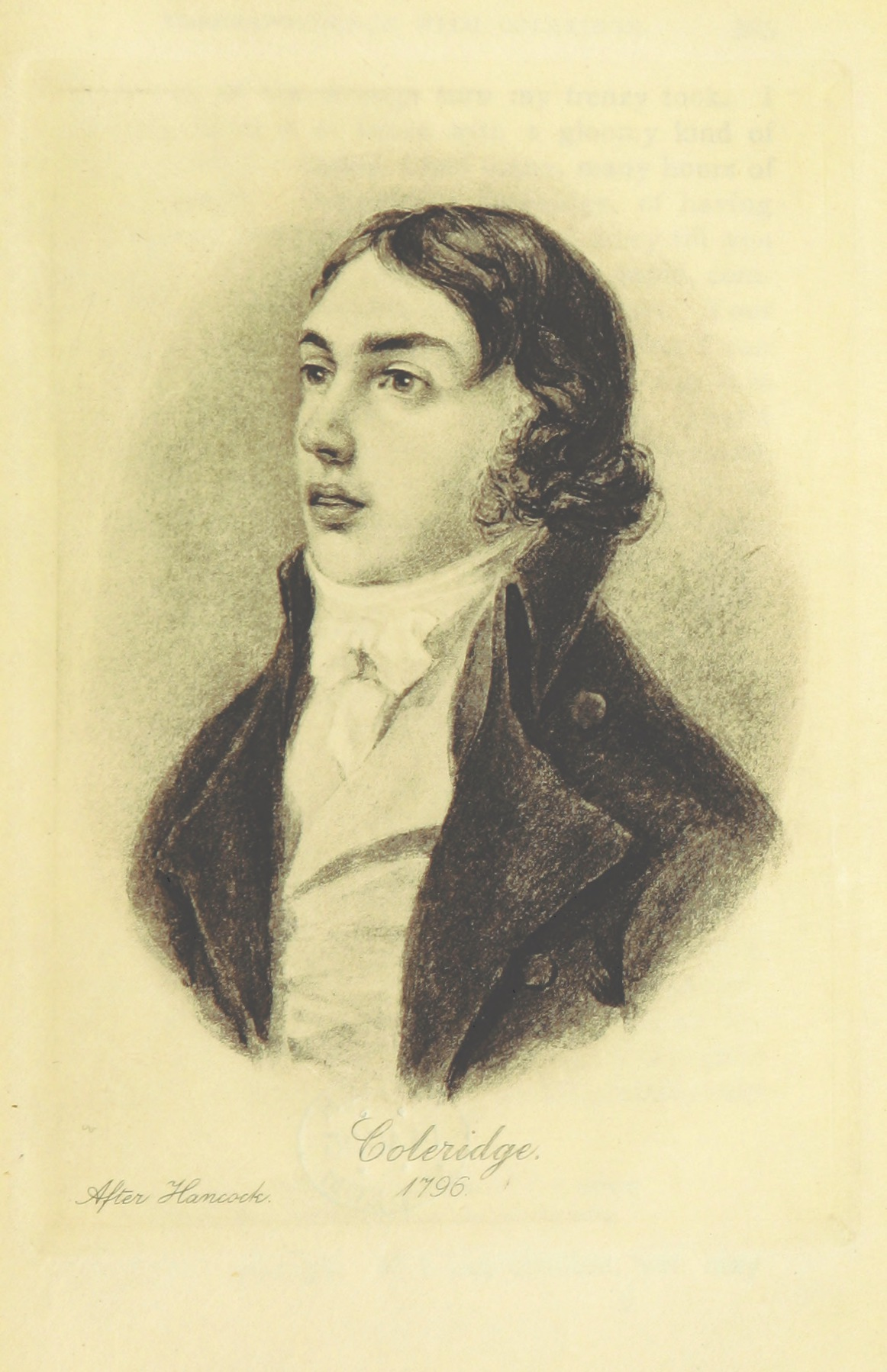
Coleridge in 1796. Engraving after a drawing by Robert Hancock

Poems on Various Subjects, Coleridge's first collection, was put together in 1795 and 1796 while he was living in a cottage in Clevedon, near Bristol, working as a Radical journalist, lecturer and pamphleteer. Publication was delayed while he revised his Religious Musings, but the book was eventually issued by the Bristol bookseller Joseph Cottle on 16 April 1796. In return for the copyright in the poems Cottle paid him 30 guineas, though Coleridge was more hopeful of gaining favourable notice from reviewers than large profits. This first edition of the book contained 51 poems, mostly written since Coleridge had dropped out from Cambridge University at the end of 1794. The collection was bookshelved by two substantial formal poems, Monody on the Death of Chatterton and Religious Musings; of the intervening pieces about half were sonnets, while the remainder included "The Eolian Harp" and two other conversation poems, as Coleridge was later to call them. Four of the sonnets, all signed with the initials C. L., were attributed by Coleridge himself to his friend Charles Lamb, but the truth is more complex. All were amended by Coleridge, and one, Effusion XIV "To Siddons", was included as Coleridge's in later collections of his poems and is probably best described as a collaboration. A fifth sonnet, Effusion XV, was completed by Lamb, as Coleridge acknowledged.

Within six months the book had sold out, and preparations began for a second edition with additional poems by both Coleridge and Lamb. In March 1797, when the printing was almost complete, Coleridge told Cottle that there would be a section of poems by another of his friends, Charles Lloyd, reassuring him that the increased costs of production would be offset by profits from the large number of copies, "more than a hundred", that Lloyd's family and friends would doubtless buy. This edition, retitled Poems, Second Edition, by S. T. Coleridge, to Which Are Now Added Poems by Charles Lamb, and Charles Lloyd, was therefore of an even more miscellaneous nature than the first. The first section, consisting of poems by Coleridge himself, omitted twenty poems from the first edition, including many of the more immature ones and all of the sonnets on political figures, but included twelve newer works. It began with a dedicatory poem to his brother, the Rev. George Coleridge, and, as before, concluded with the Religious Musings. This section comprised, Coleridge told Cottle, "my choicest fish, pick'd, gutted, and clean'd", the compound-epithets and other stylistic extravagances "pruned...with no unsparing hand". By contrast, the next two sections, by Lamb and Lloyd respectively, were in effect a Collected Works of the two young poets, occupying nearly a hundred pages. The final section, or Supplement, contains a few poems by Coleridge and his co-authors which he had, as he wrote, "reprieved from immediate oblivion". A newspaper advertisement dated 28 October 1797 announced the publication of the second edition. Coleridge almost immediately undercut his relations with his collaborators by publishing in the November 1797 number of the Monthly Magazine, under the pseudonym of Nehemiah Higginbottom, three sonnets satirising his own poems and those of Lamb and Lloyd. In consequence, when in 1798 Coleridge floated the idea of a third edition, to include The Ancient Mariner, Lloyd asked for his own poems to be withdrawn.

Nothing came of this project in 1798, but by 1803 Coleridge was again planning a new edition, this time to consist entirely of his own poems. Though he initially intended to include some of his newer conversation poems, when the book finally appeared that year, simply called Poems, by S. T. Coleridge, it was essentially a simple rearrangement of his own contributions to the 1797 edition. He even retained the short 1796 and 1797 prefaces rather than write a new one outlining his thoughts on the theory of Romantic poetry. The task of superintending the book's progress through the press was delegated to Lamb.

== Themes ==
Coleridge published the Poems just after the failure of his idealistic political scheme of Pantisocracy. His strong belief in the capacity of poetry to examine the religious and political changes of his day is reflected in both of the longest poems in the collection, the Monody on the Death of Chatterton and the Religious Musings, and also in the sonnets on prominent political figures. In contrast, there are also many poems of sensibility, described by Coleridge as "effusions", reflecting the influence of William Lisle Bowles's sonnets. These are imbued with Coleridge's own personal emotions; they are sometimes melancholy and sometimes expressive of his happiness in the early stages of his marriage to Sara Fricker. Throughout the collection runs the theme of immersion in nature as a way of communing with God.

== Reception ==
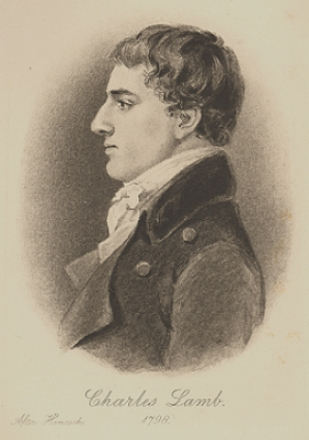
Lamb in 1798. Engraving after a drawing by Robert Hancock

Some of the earliest and best criticism of Poems on Various Subjects came from Charles Lamb in a string of letters to Coleridge, praising his Religious Musings as "the noblest poem in the language, next after the Paradise lost", urging him to "cultivate simplicity", and employing exemplary tact whenever he found fault. The book was widely reviewed, on the whole favourably, reviewers praising the author's imaginative powers, accomplished poetic diction, and alternately lofty and tender sentiment. Such adverse criticism as came was directed at shortcomings Coleridge himself had privately acknowledged as "much effeminacy of sentiment, much faulty glitter of expression", and also at metrical faults. The British Critic wished that his sentiment and expression had been "chastened by experience of mankind, or habitude of writing". The Critical Review believed that time would correct Coleridge's faults, and found Lamb's poems "very beautiful". The Monthly Review, Coleridge said, had "cataracted panegyric on my poems". Its critic, John Aikin, wrote that "the manner of an original thinker is predominant; and as he has not borrowed the ideas, so he has not fashioned himself to the polish and correctness of modern verse. Such a writer...will always be, what so few proportionally are, an interesting object to the genuine lover of poetry." The 1797 edition was more sparsely reviewed, but it was noted that Coleridge had purged his poems of many of their over-ornate expressions, and the Critical Review praised the "Reflections on Having Left a Place of Retirement" and the sonnet on the River Otter. The Monthly Visitor wrote that Coleridge's "defects..are the defects of genius and intelligence", that Lloyd's poems showed "much simplicity, sweetness, and promise", and that Lamb's contributions were "strong and harmonious", entitling him to much praise. The 1803 edition was given a short but respectful notice by the Poetical Register, while the Annual Review thought that its contents "afford examples of the best and worst manner of this striking and peculiar writer".

Coleridge told his friend John Thelwall in 1796, "I build all my poetic pretensions on the Religious Musings"; Thelwall on the other hand found that its religious passages were "the very acme of...rant", and the whole poem was "infected with inflation & turgidity". Many modern critics find themselves between these two viewpoints, Richard Holmes writing that it adds "weight in every sense" to Poems on Various Subjects and that it belies that collection's true originality. It is such lyrics and conversation poems as "The Eolian Harp" and "Lines Written at Shurton Bars" that are seen as prefiguring the great works of Coleridge's maturity. Lawrence Hanson, for example, wrote that these "are saved by their spontaneity and lightness from the confusion of overmuch thought. They contain hints of the sensuous mysticism, the delicate precision of imagery, in which Coleridge was to excel." Some critics have voiced their surprise at Coleridge's inclusion policy, pointing out that "To the River Otter" and "Reflections on Having Left a Place of Retirement" do not appear in the 1796 edition; likewise that the 1803 edition leaves out Kubla Khan, Christabel, This Lime-Tree Bower My Prison, Frost at Midnight, Fears in Solitude, France: An Ode, and Dejection: An Ode, all of which had at that date appeared only in pamphlets or newspapers.
