= List of poems by Samuel Taylor Coleridge =

This article lists the complete poetic bibliography of Samuel Taylor Coleridge (1772–1834), which includes fragments not published within his lifetime, epigrams, and titles such as The Rime of the Ancient Mariner and Kubla Khan.

== Poetry ==
Poetry of Samuel Taylor Coleridge
Title	Subtitle	First line	Composition Date	Publication Date	Class
Easter Holidays.		"Hail! festal Easter that dost bring"	1787	1912	
Dura Navis.		"To tempt the dangerous deep, too venturous youth,"	1787	1893	
Nil Pejus est Caelibe Vitâ.	[In Christ's Hospital Book]	"What pleasures shall he ever find?"	1787	1893	
Sonnet: To the Autumnal Moon		"Mild Splendour of the various-vested Night!"	1788	1796	
Anthem for the Children of Christ's Hospital.		"Seraphs! around th' Eternal's seat who throng"	1789	1834	
Julia.	[In Christ's Hospital Book]	"Julia was blest with beauty, wit, and grace:"	1789	1834	
Quae Nocent Docent.	O! mihi praeteritos referat si Jupiter annos!	"Oh! might my ill-past hours return again!"	1789	1893	
The Nose.		"Ye souls unus'd to lofty verse"	1789	1834 (Note: Third stanza was first published on January 2nd, 1798 in the Morning Post entitled "To the Lord Mayor's Nose".)	
To the Muse.		"Tho' no bold flights to thee belong;"	1789	1834	
Destruction of the Bastile.		"Heard'st thou yon universal cry,"	1789?	1834	
Life.		"As late I journey'd o'er the extensive plain"	1789	1834	
Progress of Vice.	[Nemo repente turpissimus]	"Deep in the gulph of Vice and Woe"	1790	1834	
Monody on the Death of Chatterton.	[First Version, In Christ's Hospital Book-1790 ]	"Now prompts the Muse poetic lays,"	1790	1898	
An Invocation.		"Sweet Muse! companion of my every hour!"	1790	1893	
Anna and Harland.		"Within these wilds was Anna wont to rove"	1790?	1794, October 25	
To the Evening Star.		"O meek attendant of Sol's setting blaze,"	1790?	1880	
Pain. Composed in Sickness		"Once could the Morn's first beams, the healthful breeze,"	1790?	1834	
On a Lady Weeping.	Imitation from the Latin of Nicolaus Archius	"Lovely gems of radiance meek"	1790?	1893	
Monody on a Tea-kettle.		"O Muse who sangest late another's pain,"	1790	1834	
Genevieve.		"Maid of my Love, sweet Genevieve!"	1789-90?	1794, November 1	
On receiving an Account that his Only Sister's Death was Inevitable.		"The tear which mourn'd a brother's fate scarce dry—"	1791	1834	
On seeing a Youth Affectionately Welcomed by a Sister		"I too a sister had! too cruel Death!"	1791	1834	
A Mathematical Problem.		"This is now--this was erst,"	1791, March 31	1834	
Honour.	O, curas hominum! O, quantum est in rebus inane!	"The fervid Sun had more than halv'd the day,"	1791	1834	
On Imitation.		"All are not born to soar—and ah! how few"	1791	1834	
Inside the Coach.		"'Tis hard on Bagshot Heath to try"	1791	1834	
Devonshire Roads.		"The indignant Bard composed this furious ode,"	1791	1834	
Music.		"Hence, soul-dissolving Harmony"	1791	1834	
Sonnet: On quitting School for College.	On Quitting School for College	"Farewell parental scenes! a sad farewell!"	1791	1834	
Absence. A Farewell Ode on quitting School for Jesus College, Cambridge.	A Farewell Ode on quiting school for Jesus College, Cambridge.	"Where graced with many a classic spoil"	1791	1794, October 11	
Happiness.		"On wide or narrow scale shall Man"	1791	1834	
A Wish. Written in Jesus Wood, Feb. 10, 1792.	Written in Jesus Wood, February 10, 1792	"Lo! through the dusky silence of the groves,"	1792	1893	
An Ode in the Manner of Anacreon.		"As late, in wreaths, gay flowers I bound,"	1792	1893	
To Disappointment.		"Hence! thou fiend of gloomy sway,"	1792	1895	
A Fragment found in a Lecture-room.		"Where deep in mud Cam rolls his slumbrous stream,"	1792	1895	
Ode. ('Ye Gales,' &c.)		"Ye Gales, that of the Lark's repose"	1792	1796, Mach 25	
A Lover's Complaint to his Mistress.	Who Deserted him in quest of a more wealthy husband in the East Indies	"The dubious light sad glimmers o'er the sky:"	1792	1893	
With Fielding's 'Amelia.'		"Virtues and Woes alike too great for man"	1792?	1834	
Written after a Walk before Supper.		"Tho' much averse, dear Jack, to flicker,"	1792	1796	
Imitated from Ossian.		"The stream with languid murmur creeps,"	1793	1796	
The Complaint of Ninathóma.		"How long will ye round me be swelling,"	1793	1796	
Songs of the Pixies. (Note: Prior to 1834, the second paragraph read: To this place the Author conducted a party of young Ladies, during the Summer months of the year 1793, &c.)		"Whom the untaught Shepherds call"	1793	1796	
The Rose.		"As late each flower that sweetest blows"	1793	1796	
Kisses.		"Cupid, if storying Legends tell aright,"	1793	1796	
The Gentle Look.		"Thou gentle Look, that didst my soul beguile,"	1793?	1896	
Sonnet: To the River Otter		"Dear native Brook! wild Streamlet of the West!"	1793?	1796 (Note: Lines 2-11 were, however, first published on April 2, 1796 within the Watchman.)	
An Effusion at Evening. Written in August 1792. (First Draft.)		"Imagination, Mistress of my Love!"	1793	1834	
Lines: On an Autumnal Evening		"O thou wild Fancy, check thy wing! No more"	1792, August	1796	
To Fortune	On buying a Ticket in the Irish Lottery	"Promptress of unnumber'd sighs,"	1793 (Note: Coleridge states that the poem was "Composed during a walk to and from the Queen's Head, Gray's Inn Lane, Holborn, and Hornsby's and Co., Cornhill".)	1793, November 7	
Perspiration. A Travelling Eclogue.		"The dust flies smothering, as on clatt'ring wheel"	1794	1895	
[Ave, atque Vale!] ('Vivit sed mihi,' &c.)		"Vivit sed mihi non vivit—nova forte marita,"	1794	1847	
On Bala Hill.		"With many a weary step at length I gain"	1794	1893	
Lines: Written at the King's Arms, Ross, formerly the House of the 'Man of Ross'.	Written at the King's Arms, Ross, formerly the house of the "Man Of Ross"	"Richer than Miser o'er his countless hoards,"	1794	1794, September 27	
Imitated from the Welsh.		"If while my passion I impart,"	1794	1796	
Lines: To a Beautiful Spring in a Village.		"Once more! sweet Stream! with slow foot wandering near,"	1794	1796	
Imitations: Ad Lyram. (Casimir, Book II, Ode 3.)		"The solemn-breathing air is ended—"	1794	1796, March 3	
To Lesbia.	Vivamus, mea Lesbia, atque amemus. - Catullus	"My Lesbia, let us love and live,"	1794?	1798, April 11	
The Death of the Starling.	Lugete, O Veneres, Cupidinesque - Catullus	"Pity! mourn in plaintive tone"	1794?	1836	
Moriens Superstiti. (Note: In first publication was prefaced with note " The two following verses from the French, never before published, were written by a French Prisoner as he was preparing to go to the Guillotine".)		"The hour-bell sounds, and I must go;"	1794	1798, May 10	
Morienti Superstes. (Note: In first publication was prefaced with note " The two following verses from the French, never before published, were written by a French Prisoner as he was preparing to go to the Guillotine".)		Yet art thou happier far than she	1794?	1796	
The Sigh.		"When Youth his faery reign began"	1794	1796	
The Kiss.		"One kiss, dear Maid! I said and sigh'd—"	1794?	1796	
To a Young Lady with a Poem on the French Revolution.		"Much on my early youth I love to dwell,"	1794, September	1796, March 1	
Translation of Wrangham's 'Hendecasyllabi ad Bruntonam e Granta Exituram' [Kal. Oct. MDCCXC]		"Maid of unboastful charms! whom white-robed Truth"	1794	1795	
To Miss Brunton with the preceding Translation		"That darling of the Tragic Muse,"	1794	1795	
Epitaph on an Infant. ('Ere Sin could blight.')		"Ere Sin could blight or Sorrow fade,"	1794	1794, September 23	
Pantisocracy.		"No more my visionary soul shall dwell"	1794	1849	
On the Prospect of establishing a Pantisocracy in America		"Whilst pale Anxiety, corrosive Care,"	1795	1826, March 6	
Elegy: Imitated from one of Akenside's Blank-verse Inscriptions. [(No.) III.]		"Near the lone pile with ivy overspread,"	1794?	1794, September 23	
[xiii]The Faded Flower		"Ungrateful he, who pluck'd thee from thy stalk,"	1794	1836, August	
The Outcast		"Pale Roamer through the night! thou poor Forlorn!"	1794?	1796	
Domestic Peace. (From 'The Fall of Robespierre,' Act I, l. 210.)		"Tell me, on what holy ground"	1794	1795	
On a Discovery made too late.		"Thou bleedest, my poor Heart! and thy distress"	1794	1796	
To the Author of 'The Robbers'		"Schiller! that hour I would have wish'd to die,"	1794?	1796	
Melancholy. A Fragment.		"Stretch'd on a moulder'd Abbey's broadest wall,"	1794?	1797, December 12	
To a Young Ass: Its Mother being tethered near it.		"Poor little Foal of an oppresséd race!"	1794	1794, December 30	
Lines on a Friend who Died of a Frenzy Fever induced by Calumnious Reports.		"Edmund! thy grave with aching eye I scan,"	1794	1796	
To a Friend [Charles Lamb] together with an Unfinished Poem.		"Thus far my scanty brain hath built the rhyme"	1794	1796	
I. To the Honourable Mr. Erskine		"When British Freedom for an happier land"	1794	1794, December 1	Sonnets on Eminent Characters: Contributed to the Morning Chronicle, in Dec. 1794 and Jan. 1795:—
II. Burke.		"As late I lay in Slumber's shadowy vale,"	1794	1794, December 9	Sonnets on Eminent Characters: Contributed to the Morning Chronicle, in Dec. 1794 and Jan. 1795:—
III. Priestley.		"Though rous'd by that dark Vizir Riot rude"	1794	1794, December 11	Sonnets on Eminent Characters: Contributed to the Morning Chronicle, in Dec. 1794 and Jan. 1795:—
IV. La Fayette		"As when far off the warbled strains are heard"	1794	1794, December 15	Sonnets on Eminent Characters: Contributed to the Morning Chronicle, in Dec. 1794 and Jan. 1795:—
V. Koskiusko.		"O what a loud and fearful shriek was there,"	1794	1794, December 16	Sonnets on Eminent Characters: Contributed to the Morning Chronicle, in Dec. 1794 and Jan. 1795:—
VI. Pitt (Note: Coleridge states in a Note: "'This Sonnet, and the ninth, to Stanhope, were among the pieces withdrawn from the second edition of 1797. They reappeared in the edition of 1803, and were again withdrawn in 1828, solely, it may be presumed, on account of their political vehemence. They will excite no angry feelings, and lead to no misapprehensions now, and as they are fully equal to their companions in poetical merit, the Editors have not scrupled to reproduce them. These Sonnets were originally entitled "Effusions".' appears within editions 1796, 1803 and 1852. ")		"Not always should the Tear's ambrosial dew"	1794	1794, December 23	Sonnets on Eminent Characters: Contributed to the Morning Chronicle, in Dec. 1794 and Jan. 1795:—
VII. To the Rev. W. L. Bowles.		"My heart has thank'd thee, Bowles! for those soft strains,"	1794	1794, December 26	Sonnets on Eminent Characters: Contributed to the Morning Chronicle, in Dec. 1794 and Jan. 1795:—
VII. To the Rev. W. L. Bowles.		"My heart has thank'd thee, Bowles! for those soft strains"	1794	1794, December 26	Sonnets on Eminent Characters: Contributed to the Morning Chronicle, in Dec. 1794 and Jan. 1795:—
VIII. Mrs. Siddons		"As when a child on some long Winter's night"	1794	1794, December 29	Sonnets on Eminent Characters: Contributed to the Morning Chronicle, in Dec. 1794 and Jan. 1795:—
IX. To William Godwin, Author of 'Political Justice.'		"O form'd t' illume a sunless world forlorn,"	1795?	1795, January 10	Sonnets on Eminent Characters: Contributed to the Morning Chronicle, in Dec. 1794 and Jan. 1795:—
X. To Robert Southey of Baliol College, Oxford, Author of the 'Retrospect' and other Poems.		"Southey! thy melodies steal o'er mine ear"	1795	1795, January 14	Sonnets on Eminent Characters: Contributed to the Morning Chronicle, in Dec. 1794 and Jan. 1795:—
XI. To Richard Brinsley Sheridan, (Note: Coleridge affixed the note: "Hymettian Flowrets. Hymettus, a mountain near Athens, celebrated for its honey" on line 4, in editions 1797 and 1803.) Esq.		"It was some Spirit, Sheridan! that breath'd"	1795	1795, January 29	Sonnets on Eminent Characters: Contributed to the Morning Chronicle, in Dec. 1794 and Jan. 1795:—
XII. To Lord Stanhope on reading his Late Protest in the House of Lords.		"Stanhope! I hail, with ardent Hymn, thy name!"	1795	1795, January 31	Sonnets on Eminent Characters: Contributed to the Morning Chronicle, in Dec. 1794 and Jan. 1795:—
To Earl Stanhope		"Not, Stanhope! with the Patriot's doubtful name"	1795	1796	
Lines: To a Friend in Answer to a Melancholy Letter		"Away, those cloudy looks, that labouring sigh,"	1795?	1796	
To an Infant.		"Ah! cease thy tears and sobs, my little Life!"	1795	1796	
To the Rev. W. J. Hort while teaching a Young Lady some Song-tunes on his Flute		"Hush! ye clamorous Cares! be mute!"	1795	1796	
Pity.		"Sweet Mercy! how my very heart has bled"	1795?	1796	
To the Nightingale		"Sister of love-lorn Poets, Philomel!"	1795	1796	
Lines: Composed while climbing the Left Ascent of Brockley Coomb, Somersetshire, May 1795		"With many a pause and oft reverted eye"	1795, May	1796	
Lines in the Manner of Spenser		"O Peace, that on a lilied bank dost love"	1795	1796	
The Hour when we shall meet again. (Composed during Illness and in Absence.)		"Dim Hour! that sleep'st on pillowing clouds afar,"	1795?	1796, March 17	
Lines written at Shurton Bars, near Bridgewater, September 1795, in Answer to a Letter from Bristol		"Nor travels my meandering eye"	1795	1796	
The Eolian Harp.		"My pensive Sara! thy soft cheek reclined"	1795	1796	
To the Author of Poems [Joseph Cottle]	published anonymously at Bristol in September 1795	"Unboastful Bard! whose verse concise yet clear"	1795	1795, September	
The Silver Thimble. The Production of a Young Lady, addressed [xiv]to the Author of the Poems alluded to in the preceding Epistle.		"As oft mine eye with careless glance"	1795	1796	
Reflections on having left a Place of Retirement	Sermoni propriora - Hor.	"Low was our pretty Cot: our tallest Rose"	1795	1796, October	
Religious Musings.	A Desultory poem, written on the Christmas Eve of 1794	"This is the time, when most divine to hear,"	1794-6	1796 (Note: Lines 260-357 were entitled as: "The Present State of Society" and published on March 9, 1796)	
Monody on the Death of Chatterton.		"O what a wonder seems the fear of death,"	1790-1834	1794	
The Destiny of Nations. A Vision		"Auspicious Reverence! Hush all meaner song,"	1796	1817	
Ver Perpetuum. Fragment from an Unpublished Poem		"The early Year's fast-flying vapours stray"	1796	1796, March 25	
On observing a Blossom on the First of February 1796		"Sweet flower! that peeping from thy russet stem"	1796	1796, April 11	
To a Primrose. The First seen in the Season	Nitens et roboris expers - Turget et insolida est: et spe delectat. - Ovid, Metam	"Thy smiles I note, sweet early Flower,"	1796	1796, April 27	
Verses: Addressed to J. Horne Tooke and the Company who met on June 28, 1796, to celebrate his Poll at the Westminster Election		"Britons! when last ye met, with distant streak"	1796	1893	
On a Late Connubial Rupture in High Life [Prince and Princess of Wales].		"I sigh, fair injur'd stranger! for thy fate;"	1796	1796, September	
Sonnet: On receiving a Letter informing me of the Birth of a Son.		"When they did greet me father, sudden awe"	1796, September 20	1847	
Sonnet: Composed on a Journey Homeward; the Author having received Intelligence of the Birth of a Son, Sept. 20, 1796.		"Oft o'er my brain does that strange fancy roll"	1796	1797	
Sonnet: To a Friend who asked how I felt when the Nurse first presented my Infant to me.		"Charles! my slow heart was only sad, when first"	1796	1797	
Sonnet: [To Charles Lloyd]		"The piteous sobs that choke the Virgin's breath"	1796	1796	
To a Young Friend on his proposing to domesticate with the Author. Composed in 1796		"A mount, not wearisome and bare and steep,"	1796	1797	
Addressed to a Young Man of Fortune [C. Lloyd]	Who Abandoned himself to an indolent and causeless Melancholy	"Hence that fantastic wantonness of woe,"	1796	1796, December 16	
To a Friend [Charles Lamb] who had declared his intention of writing no more Poetry		"Dear Charles! whilst yet thou wert a babe, I ween"	1796	1800	
Ode to the Departing Year		"Spirit who sweepest the wild Harp of Time!"	1796	1796, December 31	
The Raven. [MS. S. T. C.]	A Christmas Tale, Told by a School-boy to his little brothers and sisters.	"Underneath an old oak tree"	1797	1798, March 10	
To an Unfortunate Woman at the Theatre		"Maiden, that with sullen brow"	1797	1797, December 7	
To an Unfortunate Woman whom the Author had known in the days of her Innocence		"Myrtle-leaf that, ill besped,"	1797	1797	
To the Rev. George Coleridge	Of Ottery St. Mary, Devon. With Some Poems. Notus in fratres animi paterni. - Hor	"A blesséd lot hath he, who having passed"	1797	1797	
On the Christening of a Friend's Child		"This day among the faithful plac'd"	1797	1797	
Translation of a Latin Inscription by the Rev. W. L. Bowles in Nether-Stowey Church		"Depart in joy from this world's noise and strife"	1797	1836	
This Lime-tree Bower my Prison	[Addressed to Lamb Charles, Of the India House, London]	"Well, they are gone, and here must I remain,"	1797	1800	
The Foster-mother's Tale		"I never saw the man whom you describe"	1797	1798	Lyrical Ballads
The Dungeon		"And this place our forefathers made for man!"	1797	1798	Lyrical Ballads
The Rime of the Ancient Mariner		"It is an Ancient Mariner"	1797-98	1798	Lyrical Ballads
Sonnets attempted in the Manner of Contemporary Writers		"Pensive at eve on the hard world I mus'd,"	1797	1797, November	
Parliamentary Oscillators		"Almost awake? Why, what is this, and whence,"	1798	1798, January 6	
Christabel.		"The first part of the following poem was written in the"	1801	1816	
Lines to W. L. while he sang a Song to Purcell's Music		"While my young cheek retains its healthful hues,"	1797	1800	
Fire, Famine, and Slaughter	A War Ecologue	"Sisters! sisters! who sent you here"	1798	1798, January 8	
Frost at Midnight		"The Frost performs its secret ministry,"	1798, February	1798	
France: An Ode.		"Ye Clouds! that far above me float and pause,"	1798, February	1798, April 18	
The Old Man of the Alps		"Stranger! whose eyes a look of pity shew,"	1798, March 8	1798, March 8	
[xv]To a Young Lady [Miss Lavinia Poole] on her Recovery from a Fever		"Why need I say, Louisa dear!"	1798, March 31	1799, December 9	
Lewti, or the Circassian Love-chaunt.		"At midnight by the stream I roved,"	1798	1798, April 18	
Fears in Solitude.	Written in April 18, during an alarm of invasion	"A green and silent spot, amid the hills,"	1798, April 20	1798	
The Nightingale. A Conversation Poem		"No cloud, no relique of the sunken day"	1798, April	1798	Lyrical Ballads
The Three Graves.		"Beneath this thorn when I was young,"	1797-1809	1893 (Note: Parts III and IV were published in 1809, September 21, whereas parts I and II were only first published in 1893, thus the publication date reflects the publication of the poem in totality.)	
The Wanderings of Cain.		"Encinctured with a twine of leaves,"	1798	1828	
To —— (Note: Originally published without title.)		"I mix in life, and labour to seem free,"	1798?	1836	
The Ballad of the Dark Ladié		"Beneath yon birch with silver bark,"	1798	1834	
Kubla Khan	Or, A vision in a dream. A Fragment.	"In Xanadu did Kubla Khan"	1798	1816	
Recantation: Illustrated in the Story of the Mad Ox		"An Ox, long fed with musty hay,"	1798	1798, July 30	
Hexameters. ('William my teacher,' &c.)		"William, my teacher, my friend! dear William and dear Dorothea!"	1799	1851	
Translation of a Passage in Ottfried's Metrical Paraphrase of the Gospel		"She gave with joy her virgin breast;"	1799?	1817	
Catullian Hendecasyllables		"Hear, my belovéd, an old Milesian story!—"	1799?	1834	
The Homeric Hexameter described and exemplified		"Strongly it bears us along in swelling and limitless billows,"	1799?	1834	
The Ovidian Elegiac Metre described and exemplified		"In the hexameter rises the fountain's silvery column;"	1799?	1834	
On a Cataract.	From a cavern near the summit of a mountain precipice.	"Unperishing youth!"	1799?	1834	
Tell's Birth-Place	Imitated from Stolberg	"Mark this holy chapel well!"	1799?	1817	
The Visit of the Gods	Imitated from Schiller	"Never, believe me,"	1799?	1817	
From the German. ('Know'st thou the land,' &c.)		"Know'st thou the land where the pale citrons grow,"	1799	1834	
Water Ballad.	From the French	" 'Come hither, gently rowing,"	1799	1831, October 29	
On an Infant which died before Baptism. ('Be rather,' &c.)		"'Be, rather than be called, a child of God,'"	1799, April 8	1834	
Something Childish, but very Natural. Written in Germany.		"If I had but two little wings"	1799, April 23	1800	
Home-Sick. Written in Germany.		"'Tis sweet to him who all the week"	1799, May 6	1800	
Lines written in the Album at Elbingerode in the Hartz Forest.		"I stood on Brocken's sovran height, and saw"	1799, May 17	1799, September 17	
The British Stripling's War-Song.	Imitated from Stolberg	"Yes, noble old Warrior! this heart has beat high,"	1799	1799, August 24	
Names. [From Lessing.]		"I ask'd my fair one happy day,"	1799	1803	
The Devil's Thoughts.		"From his brimstone bed at break of day"	1799	1799, September 6	
Lines composed in a Concert-room		"Nor cold, nor stern, my soul! yet I detest"	1799	1799, September 24	
Westphalian Song		"When thou to my true-love com'st"	1799?	1802, September 27	
Hexameters. Paraphrase of Psalm xlvi.		"Gōd ĭs oŭr Strēngth ănd oŭr Rēfŭge: thērefŏre wīll wĕ nŏt trēmblĕ"	1799	1912	
Hymn to the Earth. [Imitated from Stolberg's Hymne an die Erde.] Hexameters		"Earth! thou mother of numberless children, the nurse and the mother,"	1799	1834	
Mahomet		"Utter the song, O my soul! the flight and return of Mohammed,"	1799?	1834	
Love.		"All thoughts, all passions, all delights,"	1799	1799, December 21	
Ode to Georgiana, Duchess of Devonshire, on the Twenty-fourth Stanza in her 'Passage over Mount Gothard'		"Splendour's fondly-fostered child!"	1799	1799, December 24	
A Christmas Carol		"The shepherds went their hasty way,"	1799	1799, December 25	
Talleyrand to Lord Grenville. A Metrical Epistle		"My Lord! though your Lordship repel deviation"	1800	1800, January 10	
Apologia pro Vita sua. ('The poet in his lone,' &c.)		"The poet in his lone yet genial hour"	1800	1822	
The Keepsake		"The tedded hay, the first fruits of the soil,"	1800?	1802, September 17	
A Thought suggested by a View of Saddleback in Cumberland.		"On stern Blencartha's perilous height"	1800	1833	
The Mad Monk		"I heard a voice from Etna's side;"	1800	1800, October 13	
[xvi]Inscription for a Seat by the Road Side half-way up a Steep Hill facing South		"Thou who in youthful vigour rich, and light"	1800	1800, October 21	
A Stranger Minstrel	Written [To Mrs. Robinson], A few weeks before her death.	"As late on Skiddaw's mount I lay supine,"	1800, November	1801	
Alcaeus to Sappho.		"How sweet, when crimson colours dart"	1800	1800, November 24	
The Two Round Spaces on the Tombstone.		"The Devil believes that the Lord will come,"	1800	1800, December 4	
The Snow-drop.		"The Devil believes that the Lord will come,"	1800	1893	
On Revisiting the Sea-shore.	After Long Absence, Under strong Medical Recommendation not to bathe.	"God be with thee, gladsome Ocean!"	1801	1801, September 15	
Ode to Tranquillity		"Tranquillity! thou better name"	1801	1801, December 4	
To Asra.		"Are there two things, of all which men possess,"	1801	1893	
The Second Birth.		"There are two births, the one when Light"	1801?	1893	
Love's Sanctuary.		"This yearning heart (Love! witness what I say)"	1801?	1893	
Dejection: An Ode.		"Well! If the Bard was weather-wise, who made"	1802, April 4	1802, October 4	
The Picture, or the Lover's Resolution		"Through weeds and thorns, and matted underwood"	1802	1802, September 6	
To Matilda Betham from a Stranger		"Matilda! I have heard a sweet tune played"	1802	1893 (Note: This poem, however, was originally printed before 1802, September 10, and preserved in a private autobiographical volume, and was only collected and published in the date stated.)	
Hymn before Sun-rise, in the Vale of Chamouni.		"Hast thou a charm to stay the morning-star"	1802	1802, September 11	
The Good, Great Man		"'How seldom, friend! a good great man inherits"	1802	1802, September 23	
Inscription for a Fountain on a Heath		"This Sycamore, oft musical with bees,—"	1802	1802, September 24	
An Ode to the Rain	Composed Before Daylight, on the Morning Appointed for the Departure of a Very Worthy, but Not Very Pleasant Visitor, Whom It Was Feared the Rain Might Detain	"I know it is dark; and though I have lain,"	1802	1802, October 7	
A Day-dream. ('My eyes make pictures,' &c.)		"My eyes make pictures, when they are shut:"	1802	1828	
Answer to a Child's Question		"Do you ask what the birds say? The Sparrow, the Dove,"	1802	1802, October 16	
The Day-dream. From an Emigrant to his Absent Wife		"If thou wert here, these tears were tears of light!"	1801-02	1802, October 19	
The Happy Husband. A Fragment		"Oft, oft methinks, the while with thee,"	1802?	1817	Sibylline Leaves
The Pains of Sleep.		"Ere on my bed my limbs I lay,"	1803	1816	
The Exchange		"We pledged our hearts, my love and I,—"	1804	1804, April 16	
Ad Vilmum Axiologum. [To William Wordsworth.]		"This be the meed, that thy song creates a thousand-fold echo!"	1805?	1893	
An Exile.		"Friend, Lover, Husband, Sister, Brother!"	1805	1893	
Sonnet. [Translated from Marini.]		"Lady, to Death we're doom'd, our crime the same!"	1805?	1893	
Phantom		"All look and likeness caught from earth,"	1805	1805, February 8	
A Sunset.		"Upon the mountain's edge with light touch resting,"	1805	1893	
What is Life?		"Resembles life what once was deem'd of light,"	1805	1829	
The Blossoming of the Solitary Date-tree	A Lament	"I seem to have an indistinct recollection of having read either in one"	1805	1828	
Separation.		"A sworded man whose trade is blood,"	1805?	1834	
The Rash Conjurer.		"Strong spirit-bidding sounds!"	1805? or 1814?	1912 (Note: The last stanza was published in 1836 entitled: "Uncomposed Poem".)	
A Child's Evening Prayer.		"Ere on my bed my limbs I lay,"	1806	1852	
Metrical Feet. Lesson for a Boy.		"Trōchĕe trīps frŏm lōng tŏ shōrt;"	1806	1834	
Farewell to Love		"Farewell, sweet Love! yet blame you not my truth;"	1806	1806, September 27	
To William Wordsworth.	Composed on the night after his recitation of a poem on the growth of an individual mind.	"Friend of the wise! and Teacher of the Good!"	1807, January	1817	Sibylline Leaves
An Angel Visitant.		"Within these circling hollies woodbine-clad—"	1801?	1836	
Recollections of Love.		"How warm this woodland wild Recess!"	1807	1817	Sibylline Leaves
To Two Sisters. [Mary Morgan and Charlotte Brent]	A Wanderer's Farwell	"To know, to esteem, to love,—and then to part—"	1807	1807, December 10	
Psyche.		"The butterfly the ancient Grecians made"	1808	1817 (Note: First published with prefaratory note 'The fact that in Greek Psyche is the common name for the soul, and the butterfly, is thus alluded to in the following stanzas from an unpublished poem of the Author'.)	
A Tombless Epitaph		"'Tis true, Idoloclastes Satyrane!"	1809?	1809, November 23	
For a Market-clock. (Impromptu.)		"What now, O Man! thou dost or mean'st to do"	1809	1836	
The Madman and the Lethargist.	An Example	"Quoth Dick to me, as once at College"	1809	1912	
The Visionary Hope		"Sad lot, to have no Hope! Though lowly kneeling"	1810	1817	Sibylline Leaves
Epitaph on an Infant. ('Its balmy lips,' &c.)		"Its balmy lips the infant blest"	1811	1811, March 20	
The Virgin's Cradle-hymn	Copied from a print of the virgin in a Roman Catholic village in Germany	"Dormi, Jesu! Mater ridet"	1811	1801, December 26	
To a Lady offended by a Sportive Observation that Women have no Souls		"Nay, dearest Anna! why so grave?"	1811?	1812	
Reason for Love's Blindness		"I have heard of reasons manifold"	1811?	1828	
The Suicide's Argument.		"Ere the birth of my life, if I wished it or no,"	1811	1828	
Time, Real and Imaginary	An Allegory	"On the wide level of a mountain's head,"	1812?	1817	Sibylline Leaves
An Invocation. From Remorse [Act III, Scene i, ll. 69-82]		"Hear, sweet Spirit, hear the spell,"	1812	1813	
The Night-scene.		" You loved the daughter of Don Manrique"	1813	1817	Sibylline Leaves
A Hymn		"My Maker! of thy power the trace"	1814	1852	
To a Lady, with Falconer's Shipwreck		"Ah! not by Cam or Isis, famous streams,"	1814	1817	Sibylline Leaves
Human Life. On the Denial of Immortality		"If dead, we cease to be; if total gloom"	1815?	1817	Sibylline Leaves
Song. From Zapolya (Act II, Sc. i, ll. 65–80.)		"A Sunny shaft did I behold,"	1815	1817	
Hunting Song. From Zapolya (Act IV, Sc. ii, ll. 56-71)		"Up, up! ye dames, and lasses gay!"	1815	1817	
Faith, Hope, and Charity. From the Italian of Guarini		"Let those whose low delights to Earth are given"	1815	1817 (Note: Published as a part of Zapolya.)	
To Nature		"It may indeed be phantasy, when I"	1820?	1836	
Limbo.		"The sole true Something—This! In Limbo's Den"	1817	1893	
Ne Plus Ultra		"Sole Positive of Night!"	1826?	1834	
The Knight's Tomb		"Where is the grave of Sir Arthur O'Kellyn?"	1817?	1834	
On Donne's Poetry		"With Donne, whose muse on dromedary trots,"	1818?	1836	
Israel's Lament	A Hebrew Dirge, chaunted in the Great Synagogue, St. James's Place, Aldgate, on the day of the Funeral of her Royal Highness the Princess Charlotte. By Hyman Hurwitz, Master of the Hebrew Academy, Highgate: with a Translation in English Verse, by S. T. Coleridge, Esq., 1817.'	"Mourn, Israel! Sons of Israel, mourn!"	1817	1817	
Fancy in Nubibus, or the Poet in the Clouds.		"O! it is pleasant, with a heart at ease,"	1817	1818, February 7	
The Tears of a Grateful People		"Oppress'd, confused, with grief and pain,"	1820	1820	
Youth and Age.		"Verse, a breeze mid blossoms straying,"	1823-1832	1834	
The Reproof and Reply	Or, The Flower-Thief's Apology, for a robbery committed in Mr. and Mrs. ——'s garden, on Sunday morning, 25 May 1823, between the hours of eleven and twelve.	""Fie, Mr. Coleridge!—and can this be you?"	1823	1834	
First Advent of Love.		"O fair is Love's first hope to gentle mind!"	1824	1834	
The Delinquent Travellers		"Some are home-sick—some two or three,"	1824	1912	
Work without Hope.		"All Nature seems at work. Slugs leave their lair—"	1825, February 21	1828	
Sancti Dominici Pallium. A Dialogue between Poet and Friend.	Found Written on the Blank Leaf at the Beginning of Butler's. 'book of the Church' (1825)	"I note the moods and feelings men betray,"	1825 or 1826	1827, May 21	
Song. ('Though veiled,' &c.)		"Though veiled in spires of myrtle-wreath,"	1825	1828	
A Character.		"A bird, who for his other sins"	1825	1834	
The Two Founts.	Stanzas Addressed to a Lady on Her Recovery With Unblemished Looks, From a Severe Attack of Pain	"'Twas my last waking thought, how it could be"	1826	1827	
Constancy to an Ideal Object		"Since all that beat about in Nature's range,"	1826?	1817	
The Pang more Sharp than All. An Allegory		"He too has flitted from his secret nest,"	1825-6?	1834	
Duty surviving Self-love. The only sure Friend of declining Life.		"Unchanged within, to see all changed without,"	1826	1828	
Homeless		"'O! Christmas Day, Oh! happy day!"	1826	1827, January	
Lines suggested by the last Words of Berengarius; ob. Anno Dom. 1088		"No more 'twixt conscience staggering and the Pope"	1826?	1827	
Epitaphium Testamentarium		"Quae linquam, aut nihil, aut nihili, aut vix sunt mea. Sordes"	1826	1827	
Ἔρως ἀεὶ λάληθρος ἑταῖρος		"In many ways does the full heart reveal"	1826	1827	
The Improvisatore; or, 'John Anderson, My Jo, John'		"Yes, yes! that boon, life's richest treat"	1827	1828	
To Mary Pridham [afterwards Mrs. Derwent Coleridge].		"Dear tho' unseen! tho' I have left behind"	1827	1827, October 16	
Alice du Clos; or, The Forked Tongue. A Ballad.	One word with two meanings is the traitor's shield and shaft: and a slit tongue be his blazon!'—Caucasian Proverb.	"'The Sun is not yet risen,"	1828?	1834	
Love's Burial-place		"Lady. If Love be dead—"	1828	1828	
Lines: To a Comic Author, on an Abusive Review		"What though the chilly wide-mouth'd quacking chorus"	1825?	1834	
Cologne		"In Köhln, a town of monks and bones"	1828	1834	
On my Joyful Departure from the same City		"As I am a Rhymer"	1828	1834	
The Garden of Boccaccio		"Or late, in one of those most weary hours,"	1828	1829	
Love, Hope, and Patience in Education.		"O'er wayward childhood would'st thou hold firm rule,"	1829	1830	
To Miss A. T.		"Verse, pictures, music, thoughts both grave and gay,"	1829	1850	
Lines written in Commonplace Book of Miss Barbour, Daughter of the Minister of the U. S. A. to England		"Child of my muse! in Barbour's gentle hand"	1829, August	1829, December 19	
Song, ex improviso, on hearing a Song in praise of a Lady's Beauty		"'Tis not the lily-brow I prize,"	1830	1830	
Love and Friendship Opposite		"Her attachment may differ from yours in degree,"	1830?	1834	
Not at Home		"That Jealousy may rule a mind"	1830?	1834	
Phantom or Fact. A Dialogue in Verse		"A lovely form there sate beside my bed,"	1830?	1834	
Desire.		"Where true Love burns Desire is Love's pure flame;"	1830?	1834	
Charity in Thought		"To praise men as good, and to take them for such,"	1830?	1834	
Humility the Mother of Charity		"Frail creatures are we all! To be the best,"	1830?	1834	
[Coeli Enarrant.]		"The stars that wont to start, as on a chace,"	1830?	1912	
Reason	['Finally, what is Reason? You have often asked me: and this is my answer':—]	"Whene'er the mist, that stands 'twixt God and thee,"	1830	1830 (Note: First published as the conclusion of Coleridge's Essay: On the Constitution of Church and State.)	
Self-knowledge	—E coelo descendit γνῶθι σεαυτόν.—Juvenal, xi. 27.	"Γνῶθι σεαυτόν!—and is this the prime"	1832	1834	
Forbearance		"Gently I took that which ungently came"	1832?	1834	
Love's Apparition and Evanishment	An Allegoric Romance	"Like a lone Arab, old and blind,"	1833	1834	
To the Young Artist Kayser of Kaserwerth		"Kayser! to whom, as to a second self,"	1833	1834	
My Baptismal Birth-day		"God's child in Christ adopted,—Christ my all,—"	1833	1834	
Epitaph.		"Stop, Christian passer-by!—Stop, child of God,"	1833, November 9	1834	
An Apology for Spencers		"Said William to Edmund I can't guess the reason"	1796, March 21	1796, March 25	Epigram
On a Late Marriage between an Old Maid and French Petit Maître		"Tho' Miss ——'s match is a subject of mirth,"	Unknown	1796, April 2	Epigram
On an Amorous Doctor		"From Rufa's eye sly Cupid shot his dart"	Unknown	1796, April 2	Epigram
Of smart pretty Fellows,' &c.		"Of smart pretty Fellows in Bristol are numbers, some"	Unknown	1912	Epigram
On Deputy ——		"By many a booby's vengeance bit"	Unknown	1798, January 2	Epigram
To be ruled like a Frenchman,' &c.		"To be ruled like a Frenchman the Briton is loth,"	1798	1912	Epigram
On Mr. Ross, usually Cognominated Nosy		"I fancy whenever I spy Nosy"	1799	1912	Epigram
Bob now resolves,' &c.		"Bob now resolves on marriage schemes to trample,"	Unknown	1912	Epigram
Say what you will, Ingenious Youth'		"Say what you will, Ingenious Youth!"	1799	1893	Epigram
If the guilt of all lying,' &c.		"If the guilt of all lying consists in deceit,"	1800	1800	Epigram
On an Insignificant		"No doleful faces here, no sighing—"	1799	1893 (Note: In 1834, however, the last two lines were published.)	Epigram
There comes from old Avaro's grave'		"There comes from old Avaro's grave"	1799	1829	Epigram
On a Slanderer		"From yonder tomb of recent date,"	1799	1893	Epigram
Lines in a German Student's Album		"We both attended the same College,"	Unknown	1856	Epigram
[Hippona]		"Hippona lets no silly flush"	1799 August, 29	1799, August 29	Epigram
On a Reader of His Own Verses		"Hoarse Mævius reads his hobbling verse"	Unknown	1799, September 7	Epigram
[iv]On a Report of a Minister's Death		"Last Monday all the Papers said"	Unknown	1799, September 18	Epigram
[Dear Brother Jem]		"Jem writes his verses with more speed"	Unknown	1799, September 23	Epigram
Job's Luck		"Sly Beelzebub took all occasions"	1799	1801, September 26	Epigram
On the Sickness of a Great Minister		"Pluto commanded death to take away"	Unknown	1799, October 1	Epigram
[To a Virtuous Oeconomist]		"You're careful o'er your wealth 'tis true:"	Unknown	1799, October 28	Epigram
[L'Enfant Prodigue]		"Jack drinks fine wines, wears modish clothing,"	Unknown	1799, November 16	Epigram
On Sir Rubicund Naso	A Court Alderman and Whisperer of Secrets	"Speak out, Sir! you're safe, for so ruddy your nose"	Unknown	1799, December 7	Epigram
To Mr. Pye		"Your poem must eternal be,"	Unknown	1800, January 24	Epigram
[Ninety-Eight]		"O would the Baptist come again"	Unknown	1800	Epigram
Occasioned by the Former		"I hold of all our viperous race"	Unknown	1800	Epigram
[A Liar by Profession]		"As Dick and I at Charing Cross were walking,"	Unknown	1800	Epigram
To a Proud Parent		"Thy babes ne'er greet thee with the father's name;"	Unknown	1800	Epigram
Rufa		"Thy lap-dog, Rufa, is a dainty beast,"	Unknown	1800	Epigram
On a Volunteer Singer		"Swans sing before they die—'twere no bad thing"	Unknown	1800	Epigram
Occasioned by the Last		"A joke (cries Jack) without a sting—"	Unknown	1800	Epigram
Epitaph on Major Dieman		"Know thou who walks't by, Man! that wrapp'd up in lead, man,"	1800?	1912	Epigram
On the Above		"As long as ere the life-blood's running,"	1800?	1912	Epigram
Epitaph on a Bad Man (1st Version)		"Of him that in this gorgeous tomb doth lie,"	Unknown	1801, September 22	Epigram
Epitaph on a Bad Man (2nd Version)		"Under this stone does Walter Harcourt lie,"	Unknown	1912	Epigram
Epitaph on a Bad Man (3rd Version)	W. H. EHEU!	"Beneath this stone does William Hazlitt lie,"	Unknown	1830, September 10	Epigram
To a Certain Modern Narcissus		"Do call, dear Jess, whene'er my way you come;"	Unknown	1801, December 16	Epigram
To a Critic	Who Extracted a Passage from a poem without adding a word respecting the context, and then derided it as unitelligible.	"Most candid critic, what if I,"	Unknown	1801, December 16	Epigram
Always Audible		"Pass under Jack's window at twelve at night"	Unknown	1801, December 19	Epigram
Pondere non Numero		"Friends should be weigh'd, not told; who boasts to have won"	Unknown	1801, December 26	Epigram
The Compliment Qualified		"To wed a fool, I really cannot see"	Unknown	1801, December 26	Epigram
What is an Epigram,' &c.		"What is an Epigram? a dwarfish whole,"	Unknown	1802, September 23	Epigram
Charles, grave or merry,' &c.		"Charles, grave or merry, at no lie would stick,"	Unknown	1802, September 23	Epigram
An evil spirit's on thee, friend,' &c.		"An evil spirit's on thee, friend! of late!"	Unknown	1802, September 23	Epigram
Here lies the Devil,' &c.		"Here lies the Devil—ask no other name."	Unknown	1802, September 23	Epigram
To One Who Published in Print, &c.	What has been entrusted to him by my Fireside	"Two things hast thou made known to half the nation,"	Unknown	1802, September 23	Epigram
Scarce any scandal,' &c.		"Scarce any scandal, but has a handle;"	Unknown	1802, September 23	Epigram
Old Harpy,' &c.		"Old Harpy jeers at castles in the air,"	Unknown	1802, September 23	Epigram
To a Vain Young Lady		"Didst thou think less of thy dear self"	Unknown	1802, September 23	Epigram
A Hint to Premiers and First Consuls	FROM AN OLD TRAGEDY, VIZ. AGATHA TO KING ARCHELAUS	"Three truths should make thee often think and pause;"	Unknown	1802, September 27	Epigram
From me, Aurelia,' &c.		"From me, Aurelia! you desired"	Unknown	1802, October 2	Epigram
For a House-Dog's Collar		"When thieves come, I bark: when gallants, I am still—"	Unknown	1802, October 2	Epigram
In vain I praise thee, Zoilus'		"In vain I praise thee, Zoilus!"	Unknown	1802, October 2	Epigram
Epitaph on a Mercenary Miser		"A poor benighted Pedlar knock'd"	Unknown	1802, October 9	Epigram
A Dialogue between an Author and his Friend		"Come; your opinion of my manuscript"	Unknown	1802, October 11	Epigram
Μωροσοφία, or Wisdom in Folly		"Tom Slothful talks, as slothful Tom beseems,"	Unknown	1802, October 11	Epigram
Each Bond-street buck,' &c.		"Each Bond-street buck conceits, unhappy elf!"	Unknown	1802, October 11	Epigram
From an Old German Poet		"That France has put us oft to rout"	Unknown	1802, October 11	Epigram
On the Curious Circumstance, That in the German, &c.	The Sun is feminine, and the moon is masculine	"Our English poets, bad and good, agree"	Unknown	1802, October 11	Epigram
Spots in the Sun		"My father confessor is strict and holy,"	Unknown	1802, October 11	Epigram
When Surface talks,' &c.		"When Surface talks of other people's worth"	Unknown	1802, October 11	Epigram
To my Candle	To Farewell Epigram	"Good Candle, thou that with thy brother, Fire,"	Unknown	1802, October 11	Epigram
Epitaph on Himself		"Here sleeps at length poor Col., and without screaming—"	Unknown	1848	Epigram
The Taste of the Times		"Some whim or fancy pleases every eye;"	1806?	1904, January 9	Epigram
On Pitt and Fox		"Britannia's boast, her glory and her pride,"	Unknown	1904, January 6	Epigram
An excellent adage,' &c.		"An excellent adage commands that we should"	Unknown	1809, November 12	Epigram
Comparative Brevity of Greek and English		"χρυσὸν ἀνὴρ εὑρὼν ἔλιπε βρόχον, αὐτὰρ ὁ χρυσὸν"	Unknown	1812	Epigram
On the Secrecy of a Certain Lady		"'She's secret as the grave, allow!'"	Unknown	1814, January 3	Epigram
Motto for a Transparency, &c. (1st Version)	&c corresponds to DESIGNED BY WASHINGTON ALLSTON AND EXHIBITED AT BRISTOL ON 'PROCLAMATION DAY'—June 29, 1814.	"We've fought for Peace, and conquer'd it at last,"	Unknown	1836	Epigram
Motto for a Transparency, &c. (2nd Version)	&c corresponds to DESIGNED BY WASHINGTON ALLSTON AND EXHIBITED AT BRISTOL ON 'PROCLAMATION DAY'—June 29, 1814.	"We've conquered us a Peace, like lads true metalled:"	Unknown	1836	Epigram
Money, I've heard,' &c.		"Money, I've heard a wise man say,"	Unknown	1893	Epigram
[v]Modern Critics		"No private grudge they need, no personal spite,"	Unknown	1817	Epigram
Written in an Album		"Parry seeks the Polar ridge,"	Unknown	1834	Epigram
To a Lady who requested me to Write a Poem upon Nothing		"On nothing, Fanny, shall I write?"	Unknown	1822, February 22	Epigram
Sentimental		"The rose that blushes like the morn,"	Unknown	1877 (Note: Date reflects date of collection, as, although stated to have been published within the literary remains, the edition was not stated, and the first publication date not found.)	Epigram
So Mr. Baker,' &c.		"So Mr. Baker heart did pluck—"	Unknown	1836	Epigram
Authors and Publishers		" 'A heavy wit shall hang at every lord,' "	Unknown	1825, December 10	Epigram
The Alternative		"This way or that, ye Powers above me!"	Unknown	Unknown	Epigram
In Spain, that land,' &c.		"In Spain, that land of Monks and Apes,"	Unknown	1871	Epigram
Inscription for a Time-piece		"Now! It is gone—Our brief hours travel post,"	Unknown	1844 (Note: Date reflects date of collection, as, although stated to have been published within the literary remains, the edition was not stated, and the first publication date not found.)	Epigram
On the Most Veracious Anecdotist, &c.		"Tom Hill, who laughs at Cares and Woes,"	Unknown	1912	Epigram
Nothing speaks but mind,' &c.		"Nothing speaks our mind so well"	Unknown	1912	Epigram
Epitaph of the Present Year on the Monument of Thomas Fuller		"A Lutheran stout, I hold for Goose-and-Gaundry"	1833, November 28	1912	Epigram
My Godmother's Beard		"So great the charms of Mrs. Mundy,"	1791?	1888	Jeux d'esprit
Lines to Thomas Poole		"Repeaating Such verse as Bowles, heart honour'd Poet sang,'	1796	1893	Jeux d'esprit
To a Well-known Musical Critic, &c (Note: &c refers to 'Remarkable for his ears sticking out of his hairs.')		"O ——! O ——! of you we complain"	1798, January 4	1798, January 4	Jeux d'esprit
To T. Poole: An Invitation (Note: Did not contain Postcript in First Publication.)		"Plucking flowers from the Galaxy"	1797, January	1888	Jeux d'esprit
Song, To be Sung by the Lovers of all the noble liquors, &c (Note: &c refers to 'Comprised under the name of Ale.')		"Ye drinkers of Stingo and Nappy so free,"	Unknown	1801, September 18	Jeux d'esprit
Drinking versus Thinking	Or, a Song Against the New Philosophy	"My Merry men all, that drink with glee"	Unknown	1801, September 25	Jeux d'esprit
The Wills of the Wisp	A Sapphic. Vix ea nostra voco	"Lunatic Witch-fires! Ghosts of Light and Motion!"	Unknown	1801, December 1	Jeux d'esprit
To Captain Findlay		"When the squalls were flitting and fleering"	1804, May 4	1912	Jeux d'esprit
On Donne's Poem 'To a Flea'		"Be proud as Spaniards! Leap for pride ye Fleas!"	1811	1912	Jeux d'esprit
[Ex Libris S. T. C.]		"This, Hannah Scollock! may have been the case;"	1814, November 25	Unknown	Jeux d'esprit
ΕΓΩΕΝΚΑΙΠΑΝ		"Eu! Dei vices gerens, ipse Divus,;	1815	1817	Jeux d'esprit
The Bridge Street Committee		"Jack Snipe"	Unknown	1836	Jeux d'esprit
Nonsense Sapphics		"Here's Jem's first copy of nonsense verses,"	Unknown	1850	Jeux d'esprit
To Susan Steele, &c.		"My dearest Dawtie!"	1829	1912	Jeux d'esprit
Association of Ideas I.—By Likeness		"Fond, peevish, wedded pair! why all this rant?"	1830?	1835	Jeux d'esprit
Association of Ideas II.—Association by Contrast		"Phidias changed marble into feet and legs."	1830?	1835	Jeux d'esprit
Association of Ideas III.—Association by Time		"I touch this scar upon my skull behind,"	1830?	1835	Jeux d'esprit
Verses Trivocular		"Of one scrap of science I've evidence ocular."	Unknown	1912.	Jeux d'esprit
Cholera Cured Before-hand	Or a premonition promulgated gratis for the use of the Useful Classes, specially those resident in St. Giles's, Saffron Hill, Bethnal Green, etc.; and likewise, inasmuch as the good man is merciful even to the beasts, for the benefit of the Bulls and Bears of the Stock Exchange.	"Pains ventral, subventral,"	1832, July 26	1834	Jeux d'esprit
To Baby Bates		"You come from o'er the waters,"	Unknown	1893 (Note: Date reflects date of collection, as, although stated to have been published within the literary remains, the edition was not stated, and the first publication date not found.)	Jeux d'esprit
To a Child		"Little Miss Fanny,"	1834	1888, Jan 28	Jeux d'esprit
An Experiment for a Metre ('I heard a Voice,' &c.)		"I heard a voice pealing loud triumph to-day:"	1801	1912.	Metrical Experiments
Trochaics		"Thus she said, and, all around,"	1801	1912.	Metrical Experiments
The Proper Unmodified Dochmius	(i. e. antispastic Catalectic)	"Bĕnīgn shōōtĭng stārs, ĕcstātīc dĕlīght."	1801	1912.	Metrical Experiments
Iambics		"No cold shall thee benumb,"	1801	1912.	Metrical Experiments
Nonsense ('Sing, impassionate Soul,' &c.)		"Sing impassionate Soul! of Mohammed the complicate story:"	Unknown	1912.	Metrical Experiments
A Plaintive Movement		"Go little Pipe! for ever I must leave thee,"	1814, October	1912.	Metrical Experiments
An Experiment for a Metre ('When thy Beauty appears')		"When thy Beauty appears,"	Unknown	1912.	Metrical Experiments
Nonsense Verses ('Ye fowls of ill presage')	[An Experiment For a Metre]	"Ye fowls of ill presage,"	Unknown	1912.	Metrical Experiments
Nonsense ('I wish on earth to sing')	[An Experiment For a Metre]	"I wish on earth to sing"	Unknown	1912.	Metrical Experiments
There in some darksome shade'		"There in some darksome shade"	1801	1893	Metrical Experiments
Once again, sweet Willow, wave thee'		"Once again, sweet Willow, wave thee!"	Unknown	1893	Metrical Experiments
Songs of Shepherds, and rustical Roundelays'		"Songs of Shepherds and rustical Roundelays,"	Unknown	1912.	Metrical Experiments
A Metrical Accident		"Then Jerome did cal"	1826, July 7	1912.	Metrical Experiments
O'er the raised &c		"O'er the raised earth the gales of evening sigh;"	1797?	1852	Fragments
Sea-ward, &c		"Sea-ward, white gleaming thro' the busy scud"	Unknown	1912	Fragments
Over my Cottage		"The Pleasures sport beneath the thatch;"	1799	1893	Fragments
In the lame and limping metre of a barbarous Latin poet—		"Est meum et est tuum, amice! at si amborum nequit esse,"	1801, November 1	1816	Fragments
Names do not &c		"Names do not always meet with Love,"	1801, December	1912.	Fragments
The Moon, &c		"The Moon, how definite its orb!"	1801?	1893	Fragments
Such love as &c		"Such love as mourning Husbands have"	1803, September	1912.	Fragments
[The Night-Mare Death in Life]		"I know 'tis but a dream, yet feel more anguish"	1803?	1912.	Fragments
Bright clouds &c		"Bright clouds of reverence, sufferably bright,"	1803	1893	Fragments
A Beck in Winter		"Over the broad, the shallow, rapid stream,"	1804, January	1912.	Fragments
I from the &c		"I from the influence of thy Looks receive,"	1804	1912.	Fragments
What never is &c		"What never is, but only is to be"	1804-5	1912.	Fragments
This silence of &c		"The silence of a City, how awful at Midnight!"	1804-5	1912.	Fragments
O beauty &c		"O beauty in a beauteous body dight!"	1805	1893	Fragments
O th'Oppressive &c		"O th' Oppressive, irksome weight"	1805	1893	Fragments
Twas not a &c		"'Twas not a mist, nor was it quite a cloud,"	1797, December	1893	Fragments
[Not a Critic—But a Judge]		"Whom should I choose for my Judge? the earnest, impersonal reader,"	1805	1912.	Fragments
A sumptuous and &c		"A sumptuous and magnificent Revenge."	1806, March	1893	Fragments
[De Profundis Clamavi]		"Come, come thou bleak December wind,"	1806, June 7	1875	Fragments
As some vast &c		"As some vast Tropic tree, itself a wood,"	1806-7	1912.	Fragments
Let Eagle bid &c		"Let Eagle bid the Tortoise sunward soar—"	1807	1888	Fragments
The body &c		"The body, Eternal Shadow of the finite Soul,"	Unknown	1912.	Fragments
Or Wren &c		"Or Wren or Linnet,"	1807, May	1912.	Fragments
The reed roof'd &c		"The reed roof'd village still bepatch'd with snow"	1798	1912.	Fragments
And in Life's &c		"And in Life's noisiest hour"	1807	1912.	Fragments
You mould my &c		"You mould my Hopes you fashion me within:"	1807	1912.	Fragments
And my heart &c		"And my heart mantles in its own delight."	Unknown	1912.	Fragments
The spruce and limber &c		"The spruce and limber yellow-hammer"	1807	1912.	Fragments
Fragment of an Ode on Napoleon		"O'erhung with yew, midway the Muses mount"	1808?	1912.	Fragments
The singing kettle &c		"The singing Kettle and the purring Cat,"	1803	1893	Fragments
Two wedded hearts &c		"Two wedded hearts, if ere were such,"	1808	1893	Fragments
Sole Maid &c		"Sole Maid, associate sole, to me beyond"	1809	1893	Fragments
Epigram on Kepler		"No mortal spirit yet had clomb so high"	1799	1912.	Fragments
When Hope but &c		"When Hope but made Tranquillity be felt:"	1810	1893	Fragments
I have experienced &c		"I have experienced"	1810	1893	Fragments
As when the new &c		"As when the new or full Moon urges"	1811	1893	Fragments
O mercy, &c		"O mercy, O me, miserable man!"	1811	1912.	Fragments
A low dead Thunder &c		"A low dead Thunder mutter'd thro' the night,"	1811	1893	Fragments
His own far countenance &c		"His own fair countenance, his kingly forehead,"	1812	Unknown	Fragments
[Ars Poetica]		"'Behold yon row of pines, that shorn and bow'd"	1815	1817	Fragments
Translation of the First Strophe of Pindar's Second Olympic		"Ye harp-controlling hymns!"	1815	1817	Fragments
O! Superstition &c		"O! Superstition is the giant shadow"	1816	1893	Fragments
Translation of a Fragment of Heraclitus		"Not hers To win the sense by words of rhetoric, "	1816	Unknown	Fragments
Truth I pursued &c		"Truth I pursued, as Fancy sketch'd the way,"	Unknown	1818	Fragments
Imitated from Aristophanes		"Great goddesses are they to lazy folks,"	1817	1818	Fragments
Let clumps of earth &c		"Let clumps of earth, however glorified,"	1820	1893	Fragments
To Edward Irving		"Friend pure of heart and fervent! we have learnt"	1824	1825	Fragments
[Luther—De Dæmonibus]		"'The angel's like a flea,"	1826	1839	Fragments
The Netherlands		"Water and windmills, greenness, Islets green;—"	1828, June	1912.	Fragments
Elisa		"Sweet Gift! and always doth Elisa send"	1833	1912.	Fragments
Profuse Kindness		"What a spring-tide of Love to dear friends in a shoal!"	Unknown / Undated	1834	Fragments
I stand alone &c		"I stand alone, nor tho' my heart should break,"	Unknown	1893	Fragments
Napoleon		"The Sun with gentle beams his rage disguises,"	Unknown	1912.	Fragments
Thicker than rain-drops &c		"Thicker than rain-drops on November thorn."	Unknown / Undated	1912.	Fragments
His native accents &c		"His native accents to her stranger's ear,"	Unknown / Undated	1893	Fragments
Each crime that &c		"Each crime that once estranges from the virtues"	Unknown / Undated	Unknown	Fragments
Where'er I find &c		"Where'er I find the Good, the True, the Fair,"	Unknown / Undated	1893	Fragments
A wind that &c		"A wind that with Aurora hath abiding"	Unknown / Undated	1893	Fragments
What boots to &c		"What boots to tell how o'er his grave"	Unknown / Undated	Unknown	Fragments
[xxii]The Three Sorts of Friends		"Though friendships differ endless in degree,"	Unknown / Undated	1835	Fragments
If fair by &c		"If fair by Nature"	Unknown	1912.	Fragments
Bo-Peep and I Spy—		"In the corner one—"	1826	1912.	Fragments
A Simile		"As the shy hind, the soft-eyed gentle Brute"	Unknown / Undated	1912.	Fragments
Baron Guelph of Adelstan. A Fragment		"For ever in the world of Fame"	Unknown / Undated	1912.	Fragments
