= Lists of poems =

This is a list of articles containing lists of poems.

== By type ==
- List of poems in Chinese or by Chinese poets
- List of epic poems
- List of long poems in English
- List of nursery rhymes
- List of poets portraying sexual relations between women
- List of U.S. state poems
- List of world folk-epics

== By author ==
- List of Brontë poems
- List of poems by Ivan Bunin
- List of poems by Catullus
- List of Emily Dickinson poems
- List of poems by Robert Frost
- List of poems by John Keats
- List of poems by Philip Larkin
- List of poems by Samuel Taylor Coleridge
- List of poems by Walt Whitman
- List of poems by William Wordsworth
- List of works by Andrew Marvell
- List of William McGonagall poems
- List of poems by Samuel Menashe
- List of poems by Wilfred Owen
- Poems by Edgar Allan Poe
- Poetry of Sappho
- List of Tolkien's alliterative verse

== Collections ==
- List of poetry anthologies
- List of poetry collections
