= Lines Written at Shurton Bars =

Poem written by Samuel Taylor Coleridge

Lines Written at Shurton Bars was composed by Samuel Taylor Coleridge in 1795. The poem incorporates a reflection on Coleridge's engagement and his understanding of marriage. It also compares nature to an ideal understanding of reality and discusses isolation from others.

== Background ==
During 1795, Coleridge met and became engaged to Sara Fricker. They met while Coleridge and Robert Southey planned to create an ideal government called Pantisocracy, and Coleridge intended that he should find a woman to join him in the new community. They eventually married on 4 October 1795 after some hesitation and uncertainty on Coleridge's side which caused him to leave her for London over the course of a few months. During the engagement, he wrote a few poems dedicated to her including the conversation poem "The Eolian Harp" and Lines Written at Shurton Bar. The "Lines" were inspired by Coleridge's walk along the Shurton Bars and he sought to write the poem in order to comfort Fricker before their marriage; during his absence, many people opposed their marriage and grew distant from her. The poem was eventually published in Coleridge's 1796 Poems on Various Subjects.

== Poem ==
Coleridge begins his poem by incorporating a quote from William Wordsworth, a poet that he would become close friends with following 1795:

Nor now with curious sight
I mark the glow-worm, as I pass,
Move with "green radiance" through the grass,
An emerald of light.

— lines 3–6

The poem continues with words that express Coleridge's closeness to Fricker and are an attempt to comfort her before their wedding:

O ever present to my view!
My wafted spirit is with you,
And soothes your boding fears:
I see you all oppressed with gloom
Sit lonely in that cheerless room—
Ah me! You are in tears!

— lines 7-12

Further into the poem is an image of alienation:

And there in black soul-jaundic'd fit
A sad gloom-pamper'd Man to sit,
And listen to the roar:
When mountain surges bellowing deep
With an uncouth monster-leap
Plung'd foaming on the shore.

— lines 49–54

The poem ends with the soon to be experienced act of conjugal love:

How oft, my Love! with shapings sweet
I paint the moment, we shall meet!
With eager speed I dart—
I seize you in the vacant air,
And fancy, with a husband's care
I press you to my heart!

'Tis said, in Summer's evening hour
Flashes the golden-colour'd flower
A fair electric flame:
And so shall flash my love-charg'd eye
When all the heart's big ecstasy
Shoots rapid through the frame!

— lines 85–96

== Themes ==
The poem is a love poem that focuses on nature and scenery. The lines focusing on consummation suggest possible doubts within Coleridge on his ability to go through with a real sexual act and a real relationship as opposed to an idealised fantasy. Another cause of concern for Coleridge within these lines is the possibility of having to give up poetry for his marriage. These lines also incorporate the word "flash", which is connected to Jacob Boehme's view of love and to Coleridge's understanding of love as acting in a similar manner to the sunrise. Other psychological concerns that appear in the poem and in his other poetry include feelings of melancholy and alienation. In regards to solitude, the poem is connected to the use of nature in William Collins's "Ode to Evening" as a means to discuss isolation. In particular, Fricker's loneliness is compared to that of a lonely man and to the opening of a rose in order to convince her that her sorrow is not as bad as that experienced by others.

By using a line from Wordsworth's poem "An Evening Walk", Coleridge follows a standard action in poetry that serves to acknowledge the existence of another poet. In a footnote to the poem, Coleridge explains why he chose a line from Wordsworth: "A poet whose versification is occasionally harsh, and his diction too frequently obscure; but whom I deem unrivalled among the writers of the present day in manly sentiment, novel imagery, and vivid colouring". The note then points out that Wordsworth's 1793 collection of poems was received by critics harshly, and that this criticism allowed the poet to come to Coleridge's attention: "A gentleman near Bristol makes it an invariable rule to purchase every work that is violently abused by the Reviewers: and with a very few exceptions I never saw a more judicious selection of recent Compositions, both in prose and verse."

== Critical review ==
When Coleridge's Poems on Various Subjects was reviewed, few reviewers paid attention to Lines Written at Shurton Bars. John Aikin, in the June 1796 Monthly Review, states, "The most of [the 'poetical Epistles'], addressed to his 'Sara', is rather an ode, filled with picturesque imagery: of which the follow stanzas [lines 36–60] compose a very striking sea-piece". This emphasis on water was picked up again during the mid-19th century: an essay by Monkshood in the Bentley's Miscellany claims that the "marine melodies" in Lines Written at Shurton Bars are "stanzas sixteen and sweet" that contain "A bit of wave-painting, by the way, that shows how S. T. C. would have appreciated Mr. Ruskin's pictorial analysis of a composite wave, and his protest against the pretty platitudes that pass current on canvas for the real things."

A 23 August 1828 review in the Literary Gazette, in regards to a series of quotes including lines 43–72 from the poem, wrote, "We are now going to quote just a few fragments [...] all of them bearing the stamp of everlasting fame, each and all of the finest poetry. Speaking of change produced in him by happy love".

Hendrik Rookmaaker, in 1984, argues that "Coleridge often uses nature as a sort of 'picture book' with which general statements about life and morality are illustrated" and that "The most interesting example of this use of nature imagery is found in 'Lines Written at Shurton Bar'". The Columbia History of British Poets of 1994 simply describes the poem as "beautiful". In 2001, Lucy Newlyn emphasises the importance of the note included with the poem: "The Note is more than an acknowledgement. It is a public declaration of friendship: a construction of literary myth."
