= Monody (lament) =

In Byzantine literature, a monody (μονῳδία, monodia) was a funerary oration, usually addressed to the deceased, praising their virtues and lamenting their death.

Originally, the term monody referred to an ode sung by a single performer, rather than by a chorus, either as part of a tragedy or on its own, as at a symposium. It could be sapphic or alcaic and could cover any topic but gradually became associated with lamentation and the term became synonymous with dirge. Eventually, it ceased to imply poetry and indicated only a ritual lament in rhetorical style. The general term for a ritual lament in Greek was θρῆνος (threnos). The term threnody (θρηνῳδία) was not used in Byzantine literature, other than the singular case of Michael Choniates' monody on Theophylaktos Belissariotes, where it may have been added by a scribe.

The monody was only one of three types of funeral oration distinguished in Byzantine rhetoric, alongside the commemorative and consolatory. In general, since monodies were expected also to commemorate (so as to provide solid reasons for mourning the deceased), the distinction between monodies and commemorative orations is blurry. Rhetoricians considered monodies appropriate only for young persons, but this was not followed in practice. They were also supposed to be short, but this too was often ignored.

Pseudo-Menander in the treatise On Epideictic Speeches from the late 3rd century defines the monody thus:

What then is the purpose of the monody? To lament and express pity. If the deceased is not a relative, it is simply to lament the departed, mixing encomia with the lament, and to stress the element of lamentation continually, so that the piece is not just an encomium, but the encomium is the occasion for the lament. If, however, the deceased is a relative, the speaker should lament no less, either because he has been left an orphan or because he is deprived of an excellent father and is mourning his own desolation. If the deceased is a leader of the city, you should say something about the city itself, handling the encomia of this in accordance with the subject—'the city is splendid, but he who raised it up is he who has fallen'. Or again: 'Who will take care of it, who will preserve it, as he did?' If the deceased is young, you must base the lament on his age, on his nature (he was gifted, the hopes he raised were great) and on the calamity that has happened—e.g. the bridal chamber, the alcove, were soon to be made ready for him. You should base it also on the city: 'It expected to have in him a champion, an orator, an organizer of games.' The procedure must always be to make these considerations the starting-points of the lamentation. Thus, in these speeches, you should begin with a complaint against the divine powers and unjust fate, and the destiny that laid down an unjust law, and then proceed at once to take your cue from the immediate situation: 'What a man they have snatched away, how they have exulted over the fallen!' But—to save us saying the same things many times over—you should simply use this technique and divide your speech with a view to these subjects.

Modern English poets have sometimes employed the term for laments: John Milton for his "Lycidas", Matthew Arnold for his "Thyrsis", Samuel Taylor Coleridge's "Monody on the Death of Chatterton" and Herman Melville's "Monody".

== Sources ==
- Brogan, T. V. F.; Hornsby, R. A. (2012). "Monody". In Roland Greene (ed.). The Princeton Encyclopedia of Poetry and Poetics (4th ed.). Princeton University Press. p. 897.
- Lauxtermann, Marc D. (2019). Byzantine Poetry from Pisides to Geometres: Texts and Contexts. Vol. 2. Austrian Academy of Sciences Press.
- Papadopoulos, Alexandros (2023). "Michael Choniates' Monody on Theophylaktos Belissariotes: A New Critical Edition and Study". Byzantinoslavica. 81 (1–2): 248–284. doi:10.58377/BYZSLAV.2023.9.
- Russell, D. A.; Wilson, N. G., eds. (1981). Menander Rhetor: A Commentary. Clarendon Press.
