= To Mrs Siddons =

Poem written by Samuel Taylor Coleridge

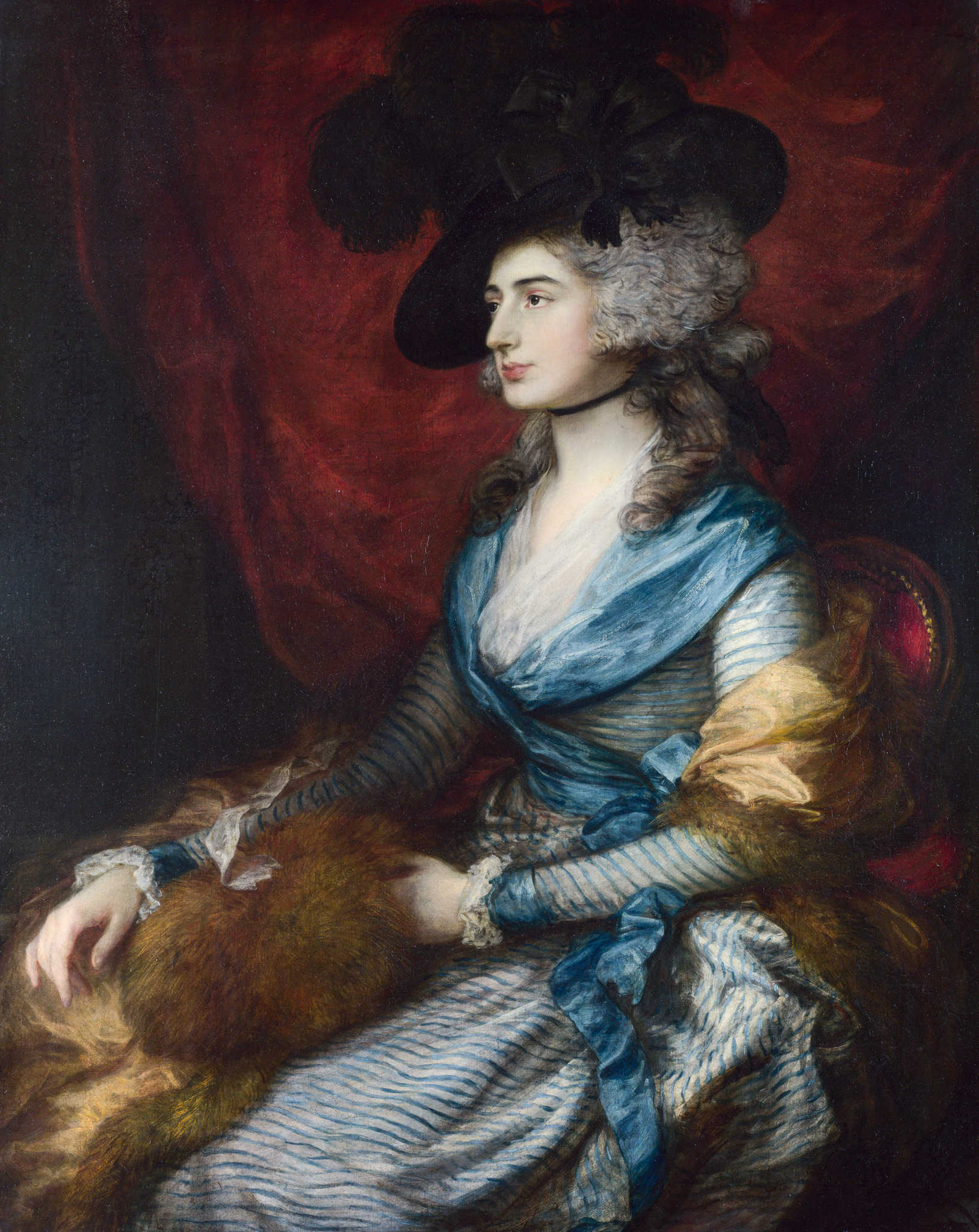
Portrait of Sarah Siddons by Thomas Gainsborough in 1785

"To Mrs Siddons" was written by Samuel Taylor Coleridge and published in the 29 December 1794 Morning Chronicle as part of the Sonnets on Eminent Characters series. It describes Sarah Siddons, an actress Coleridge became fond of during his visits to London during college. The poem celebrates watching Siddons perform her various roles on stage. The actual authorship of the poem is uncertain, since it was attributed to Charles Lamb in various works. It is possible that Lamb and Coleridge worked on the poem together, and, if so, it would be one of Lamb's earliest works.

== Background ==
Mrs Siddons, as Coleridge refers to her, was an actress whom he became aware of during his college years. In his letters to his childhood friend Mary Evans, Coleridge would mention various performances that he witnessed when he would slip into London. The sonnet dedicated to her, "To Mrs Siddons", is the eighth poem of Coleridge's Sonnets on Eminent Characters series, printed in the 29 December 1794 Morning Chronicle as written by Coleridge. However, it is uncertain as to who originally wrote the poem. In a letter written by Lamb in June 1796, he speaks of the poem as if it was originally written by him and edited by Coleridge. When the poem was printed in Coleridge's 1796 collection of poems, it is attributed to Lamb. When the poem was to be printed in Coleridge's 1803 edition of poems, Lamb did not claim ownership of the poem.

The poem was edited by someone between its various printings but with few changes. The poem was also not included in Lamb's 1798 or 1818 collections of poems, but Coleridge did not include the poem in any of his later collections of poems. Although the true authorship is unknown, it is possible that the poem was jointly written by Coleridge and Lamb, and that neither was able to determine who had the true ownership over the poem. Lamb separated the poem from his other sonnets, and later editors attributed the work as a joint creation of both poems. J.C.C. Mays points out the evidence of a joint authorship and claims, "It is less likely that [Lamb] wrote it entirely, gave it to [Coleridge] to meet his newspaper obligations, and then had no interest in claiming it for his own, since he did think it worth preserving in [Coleridge's] 1803 volume."

Regardless of the role that each of the poets had within the poem, "To Mrs Siddons" is considered one of Lamb's earliest known poems. However, the poems have been seen as different from Lamb's other poems, as William Hazlitt, Lamb's contemporary, points out: "Lamb's first compositions were in verse—produced slowly, at long intervals,—and with self-distrust, which the encouragements of Coleridge could not subdue. With the exception of a sonnet to Mrs. Siddons, whose acting, [...] had made a deep impression upon him, they were exclusively personal."

== Poem ==
The 1796 edition of the poem reads:

As when a child on some long winter's night
Affrighted clinging to its Grandam's knees
With eager wond'ring and perturb'd delight
Listens strange tales of fearful dark decrees
Mutter'd to wretch by necromatic spell;
Or of those hags, who at the witching time
Of murkey midnight ride the air sublime,
And mingle foul embrace with fiends of Hell:
Cold Horror drinks it's blood! Anon the tear
More gentle starts, to hear the Beldame tell
Of pretty babes, that lov'd each other dear,
Murder'd by cruel Uncle's mandate fell:
Ev'n such the shiv'ring joys thy tones impart,
Ev'n so thou, SIDDONS! meltest my sad heart!
(lines 1–14)

== Themes ==
Of the various individuals that Coleridge's Sonnets on Eminent Characters discusses, representatives from the theatre industry was limited to Siddons, as an actress, and Richard Sheridan, a playwright. Although Coleridge writes about her and many people viewed Siddons as an important actress, Siddons had little actual contact or involvement with the Romantic poets beyond knowing Walter Scott and once meeting Lord Byron.

The poem refers to various roles that Siddons, as an actress, would have played by discussing plays that she was a member. It is possible that these references are to William Shakespeare's Macbeth, Hamlet, or Richard III along with Nicholas Rowe's Tragedy of Jane Shore. Besides the allusions to plays, the beginning of the poem compares Siddons's acting having a power over Coleridge as a children's story. Coleridge's impression of Siddons would continue for years after; in February 1797 Coleridge started creating a play that he hoped that Siddons would have a part. The play, called Osorio, was later rejected by the producers at Drury Lane, the theatre that he hoped would perform the play.
