= On Receiving an Account =

Poem by Samuel Taylor Coleridge (1794)

On Receiving an Account that his only Sister's Death was Inevitable was composed by Samuel Taylor Coleridge in 1794, and deals with the death of Coleridge's step-sister Ann (1791), as well as that of his brother Luke (1790). A later poem ('To a Friend'), was written for Coleridge's friend Charles Lamb and seeks to comfort him after the loss of his sister.

== Background ==
After Coleridge's father died when he was young, he would often experience feelings of loneliness. He was distant from his mother, and his education at Christ's Hospital, London separated him from any of his relatives. However, while attending the school he did become close to his brothers George and Luke and sister Nancy. When Coleridge received notice of the death of his brother Luke in February 1790 and later of his sister Ann during March 1791 near the end of his school career, he decide to compose the sonnet "On Receiving an Account that his only Sister's Death was Inevitable". The poem was published over 40 years later in an edition of his works in 1834.

In December 1794, Coleridge composed a second poem that partially deals with the events of his sister's death. The poem, "To a Friend", was sent on 29 December to Lamb when Coleridge received notice that Lamb's sister was ill. Within the poem, Coleridge invokes the memory of his own sister in order to comfort his friend. The poem was sent along with his Religious Musings. "To a Friend" was published in Coleridge's 1796 edition of poems and later in the 1797 and 1803 editions.

== Poem ==
"On Receiving an Account" is a "schoolboy sonnet" and begins:

The tear which mourn'd a brother's fate scarce dry—
Pain after pain, and woe succeeding woe—
Is my heart destin'd for another blow?
O my sweet sister! and must thou too die?

— lines 1–4

Coleridge then uses the exclamation "ah", a standard in his poetry, in order to express feelings of regret:

Ah! how has Disappointment pour'd the tear
O'er infant Hope destroy'd by early frost!
How are ye gone, whom most by soul held dear!

— lines 5–7

The original manuscript of the poem contains a mistake of substituting "mother" instead of "father" when his mother was still alive and it was his father who was deceased. The lines were supposed to list those family members that have died, and the printed version was corrected to read:

Scarce had I lov'd you ere I mourn'd you lost;
Say, is this hollow eye, this heartless pain,
Fated to rove thro' Life's wide cheerless plain—
Nor father, brother, sister meets its ken—
My woes, my joys unshared! [...]

— lines 8–12

=== To a Friend ===
Within "To a Friend", Coleridge describes his sister in motherly terms:

I too a Sister had, an only Sister—
She lov'd me dearly, and I doted on her!
To her I pour'd forth all my puny sorrows
(As a sick Patient in a Nurse's arms)

— lines 12-15

He continues with his description of her and her importance:

And of the heart those hidden maladies
That e'en from Friendship's eye will shrink asham'd.
O! I have wak'd at midnight, and have wept,
Because she was not! [...]

— lines 16-19

== Themes ==
Like "On Receiving an Account", many of Coleridge's early poems deal with death and its many variations: Monody on the Death of Chatterton deals in part with Chatterton's suicide, "Destruction of the Bastile" deals with the French revolution and "Dura Navis" deals with fighting at sea and cannibalism. Although Coleridge mourns over his siblings and the suffering that comes when people die, he is equally concerned about his own suffering and his fear that he would go without being loved. This theme of suffering and lack of love appears in his other poems, including Dejection: An Ode.

The emphasis by Coleridge on his sister expresses both grief and his own isolation from others. In terms of relationships with siblings and sisters in general, Coleridge wrote a few other poems on the topic including "On Seeing a Youth Welcomed by his Sister" (1791) and a brief mention of his sister in "Frost At Midnight" (1798).

== Critical response ==
Geoffrey Yarlott declares, "It is an inferior poem, interesting mainly because its final line contains his earliest premonition perhaps of his acute need for female affection and of what the loss of it meant." Similarly, Rosemary Ashton believes that the poem is "unremarkable as we might expect from an eighteen-year-old", and is interesting because the manuscript accidentally substituted "mother" for "father" .
