= Ode on the Departing Year =

Poem written by Samuel Taylor Coleridge

Ode on the Departing Year was composed by Samuel Taylor Coleridge in 1796. The poem describes Coleridge's feelings on politics and religion, and it emphasises an idyllic lifestyle as an optimal way of living.

== Background ==
While Coleridge lived in Bristol during the end of 1796, he worked on trying to get his poetry published and submitted many of his pieces to various magazines. The Ode to the Departing Year was submitted to the Cambridge Intelligencer and published 31 December. In a letter to Thomas Poole, on 26 December 1796, Coleridge explains,

Soon after the commencement of this month, the Editor of the Cambridge Intelligencer [...] requested me, by Letter, to furnish him with some Lines for the last day of this Year. I promised him that I would make the attempt; but, almost immediately after, a rheumatic complaint seized on my head, and continued to prevent the possibility of poetic composition till within the last three days. So in the course of the last three days the following Ode was produced. In general, when an Author informs the Public that his production was struck off in a great hurry, he offers an insult, not an excuse. But I trust that the present case is an exception, and that the peculiar circumstances, which obliged me to write with such unusual rapidity, give a propriety to my professions of it [...] For me to discuss the literary merits of this hasty composition, were idle and presumptuous [...] I am more anxious, lest the moral spirit of the Ode should be mistaken. You, I am sure, will not fail to recollect, that among the Ancients, the Bard and the Prophet were one and the same character; and you know, that although I prophesy curses, I pray fervently for blessings.

At the beginning of 1797 after the poem was published, Coleridge was attempting to complete his long poem titled The Destiny of Nations. A Vision for a 1797 edition of his poems. When Coleridge was no longer able to complete the poem, he replaced it with Ode to the Departing Year in the collection.

== Poem ==
The poem begins with a prayer to Divine Providence:

Spirit who sweepest the wild Harp of Time!
It is most hard, with an untroubled ear
Thy dark inwoven harmonies to hear!
Yet, mine eye fix'd on Heaven's unchanging clime
Long had I listen'd, free from mortal fear,
With inward stillness, and a bowéd mind;
When lo! its folds far waving on the wind,
I saw the train of the Departing Year!

— lines 1–8

The poem then predicts the fall of Britain if the British government was to ally with monarchies of Continental Europe against the French:

Not yet enslaved, not wholly vile,
O Albion! O my mother Isle!
Thy valleys, fair as Eden's bowers
...
Hence for many a fearless age
Has social Quiet lov'd thy shore;
Nor ever proud Invader's rage
Or sack'd thy towers, or stain'd thy fields with gore.

Abandon'd of Heaven! mad Avarice thy guide,
At cowardly distance, yet kindling with pride—
Mid thy herds and thy corn-fields secure thou hast stood,
And join'd the wild yelling of Famine and Blood!
The nations curse thee! They with eager wondering
Shall hear Destruction, like a vulture, scream!

— lines 121-123, 131-140

The poem ends with a description of living a meek, agrarian life:

Away, my soul, away!
In vain, in vain the Birds of warning sing—
And hark! I hear the famish'd brood of prey
Flap their lank pennons on the groaning wind!
Away, my soul, away!
I unpartaking of the evil thing,
With daily prayer and daily toil
Soliciting for food my scanty soil,
Have wail'd my country with a loud Lament.
Now I recentre my immortal mind
In the deep Sabbath of meek self-content;
Cleans'd from the vaporous passions that bedim
God's Image, sister of the Seraphim.

— lines 149–161

== Themes ==
In terms of the political themes, Coleridge added a note to a later edition of the work which says, "Let it not be forgotten during the perusal of this Ode that it was written many years before the abolition of the Slave Trade by the British Legislature, likewise before the invasion of Switzerland by the French Republic, which occasioned the Ode that follows, a kind of Palinodia." The actual topic of the poem is the death of Catherine of Russia and a prophecy that Britain will fall if they fight against France. Within the poem she is described as a Hag, and the poem opposes Catherine because she opposed France.

The use of prophesy is connected to what Coleridge does in his poem Religious Musings and the political themes are connected to The Destiny of Nations. In particular, there is an emphasis on the suffering of mankind and how people need to think about the problems of society as a whole to fix the social ills. Along with the political message, Ode on the Departing Year and The Destiny of Nations relies on the image of a harp as a way to promote his message. Connections to the themes in Coleridge's poetry continued until the late poem, "Ne Plus Ultra", incorporates parallels to the ideas within the Ode.

Coleridge believed during 1796 that the best life is one of hard work farming with a modest lifestyle, which comes out in the end of Ode on the Departing Year. In a Letter to Poole in December, Coleridge wrote: "I mean to work very hard — as Cook, Butler, Scullion, Shoe-cleaner, occasional Nurse, Gardener, Hind, Pig-protector, Chaplain, Secretary, Poet, Reviewer, and omni-botherum shilling-scavenger — in other words, I shall keep no Servant, and will cultivate my Land-acre and my wise-acres, as well as I can." After the poem was published on 31 December 1796, Coleridge set out from Bristol to be with his wife Sara and their child; his plan was to move to Stowey to become a farmer.

== Critical response ==
In 1959, John Colmer wrote, "Two of these poems, the Ode on the departing Year and France: An Ode, form landmarks in the development of Coleridge's political thought. The dominant note of the first is a deep disgust with his native land for associating herself with the armed ambition of the continental powers, particularly with Russia."
