= Songs of the Pixies =

Poem by Samuel Taylor Coleridge (1793)

"Songs of the Pixies" was composed by Samuel Taylor Coleridge during 1793. The poem describes Coleridge's summer vacation and his childhood home. It also incorporates Coleridge's own view of himself as a young poet.

== Background ==
During Coleridge's 1793 summer vacation from Christ's Hospital, he stayed with his family members in Ottery St Mary, Devon. Both "Songs of the Pixies" and the smaller "To Miss Dashwood Bacon", written during this time, refer to The Pixies' Parlour, a place near Ottery and to events taking place during Coleridge's vacation: the locals during that time dubbed Miss Boutflower as "fairy queen", an event recorded by Ann Bacon. The "Songs of Pixies" was printed multiple times, including in Coleridge's 1796 edition of Poems on Various Subjects. However, Coleridge was opposed to the poem as years passed and said "Neither ["Monody on the Death of Chatterton"] or the Pixies' Parlour would have been in the second Edition, but for dear Cottle's solicitous importunity".

== Poem ==
The poem begins with a note that explains the connection between pixies and his home: "At a small distance from a village in that county [Devonshire], half-way up a wood-cover'd Hill, is an Excavation, called the Pixies' Parlour [...] To this place the Author conducted a party of young Ladies during the summer months of the year, 1793—one of whom (of stature elegantly small, and of complexion colourless yet clear) was proclaimed the Fairy Queen—on which occasion the following Irregular Ode was written".

The fourth stanza connects Coleridge with a "youthful Bard":

By Indolence and Fancy brought,
A youthful Bard, "unknown to Fame,"
Wooes the Queen of Solemn Thought,
And heaves the gentle misery of a sigh
Gazing with tearful eye,
As round our sandy grot appear
Many a rudely-sculptur'd name
To pensive Memory dear!
Weaving gay dreams of sunny-tinctur'd hue,
We glance before his view:
O'er his hush'd soul our soothing witcheries shed
And twine the future garland round his head.

— lines 35–46

The poem then describes how the pixies spent their time in Ottery:

Then with quaint music hymn the parting gleam
By lonely Otter's sleep-persuading stream;
Or where his wave with loud unquiet song
Dash'd o'er the rocky channel froths along;
Or where, his silver waters smooth'd to rest,
The tall tree's shadow sleeps upon his breast.

— lines 67–72

== Themes ==
The poem borrows from many other poems. In particular, Coleridge included lines connected to A Midsummer Night's Dream, the works of John Milton, Collins, Bowles, Alexander Pope's translation of the Iliad, and Gray's elegies among others. Coleridge's Songs of the Pixies is unique to his poems in that he focuses on fairies in a manner similar to Milton's Comus and images found within Milton's Allegro and Il Penseroso. In the poem, Coleridge is self-described as a bard in regard to his poetic status. After Coleridge met William Wordsworth, he began to praise his fellow poet and assigned the title bard to his new friend. He was to also change from describing himself in the poem to being crowned with laurels to crowning others with laurels in his later poetry.

== Critical response ==
A 1796 review within the Analytical Review reviewed Coleridge's collection of poems and stated "The general character of the composition is rather that of splendour than of simplicity; and the reader is left more strongly impressed with an idea of the strength of the writer's genius, than of the correctness of his taste. As a pleasing example of Mr. C.'s inventive powers, we shall quote two or three stanzas from a piece which he entitles, 'Songs of the Pixies'". A review by John Aikin in the Monthly Review in 1796 was to say only that "The next piece of moderate length is entitled 'Songs of the Pixies': which are, it seems, in the rustic superstition of Devonshire, a kind of fairies, harmless or friendly to man. Ariel, Oberon, and the Sylphs, have contributed to form the pleasing imagery of which the two following stanzas will give a specimen".

During the 19th-century, Alois Brandl pointed out that, in regard to the similarities to Milton's poetry, "All these coincidences taken separately prove but little, but considered together they are highly characteristic of Coleridge's method of study". Near the end of the century, H. D. Traill wrote:

It is only in the region of the fantastic and supernatural that Coleridge's imagination, as he was destined to show by a far more splendid example two years afterwards, seems to acquire true poetic distinction. It is in the Songs of the Pixies that the young man 'heaves the gentle misery of a sigh,' and the sympathetic interest of the reader of today is chilled by the too frequent intrusion of certain abstract ladies [...] one cannot but feel that the Songs of the Pixies was the offspring not of a mere abundant and picturesque vocabular but of a true poetic fancy. It is worth far more as an earnest of future achievement than the very unequal Monody on the Death of Chatterton [...] and certainly than anything which could be quoted from the Effusions

At the beginning of the 20th-century, Arthur Salmon argued that "Among his earlier poems there is a 'Song of the Pixies,' which proves that he had not forgotten native superstitions, but there is little of the true Devonshire spirit in this rather stilted ode." In 1975 when describing Coleridge's Poems on Various Subjects (1796), Samuel Chew and Richard Altick wrote, "One or two small poems, such as the Song of the Pixies, show a timid venturing into the realms of the glamorous where Coleridge was soon to be at home." At the end of the 20th-century, Rosemary Ashton believes, in regard to Song of the Pixies, that the "high point is in the fourth stanza" and "Though not good, the verse is interesting for more than one reason. First it acknowledges that for this young poet success in poetry is yet to come [...] Moreover, Coleridge shows signs of learning to control the strong rhythms and irregular line length of the ode form."

== See also ==
- Pixie Day
