= Religious Musings =

Poem written by Samuel Taylor Coleridge

Religious Musings was composed by Samuel Taylor Coleridge in 1794 and finished by 1796. It is one of his first poems of critical merit and contains many of his early feelings about religion and politics.

== Background ==
While staying in London over the 1794 Christmas season, Coleridge began writing Religious Musings. He continued to work on the poem for over a year and it was published in his 1796 collection of poems as Religious Musings: A Desultory Poem, Written on the Christmas Even of 1794. This was the first true publication of the poem, but an excerpt was printed in his short lived paper The Watchman, in the 9 March issue under the title "The Present State of Society". Also, Religious Musings was expanded with an addition just after its first publication.

After finishing the poem in March 1796, Coleridge wrote to his friend Thomas Poole in April to say "I pin all my poetical credit on the Religious Musings." In a letter to John Thelwall, a fellow poet with similar political views, he wrote in April, "I beg your acceptance of my Poems — you will find much to blame in them — much effeminancy of sentiment, much faulty glitter of expression. I build all my poetic pretentions on the Religious Musings".

== Poem ==
Religious Musings is a 420-line blank verse poem. The poem begins with a connection to John Milton's On the Morning of Christ's Nativity by referring to the narrator as a prophet. Along with this prophetic emphasis is a description of Christ's birth:

This is the time, when most divine to hear,
The voice of Adoration rouses me,
As with a Cherub's trump: and high upborne,
Yea, mingling with the Choir, I seem to view
The vision of the heavenly multitude,
Who hymned the song of Peace o'er Bethlehem's fields!
Yet thou more bright than all the Angel-blaze,
That harbingered thy birth, Thou Man of Woes!

— lines 1–8

Partway through the poem, the narrator introduces the idea of One Life:

There is one Mind, one omnipresent Mind,
Omnific. His most holy name is Love.
Truth of subliming import! with the which
Who feeds and saturates his constant soul,
He from his small particular orbit flies
With blest outstarting! From himself he flies,
Stands in the sun, and with no partial gaze
Views all creation; and he loves it all,
And blesses it, and calls it very good!
This is indeed to dwell with the Most High!
Cherubs and rapture-trembling Seraphim
Can press no nearer to the Almighty's throne.

— lines 105-116

As the poem progresses, the narrator lists those who work to use science and reason to help mankind, including Benjamin Franklin, called "Patriot Sage":

From Avarice thus, from Luxury and War
Sprang heavenly Science; and from Science Freedom.
O'er waken'd realms Philosophers and Bards
Spread in concentric circles: they whose souls,
Conscious of their high dignities from God,
Brook not Wealth's rivalry! and they, who long
Enamoured with the charms of order, hate
The unseemly disproportion: and whoe'er
Turn with mild sorrow from the Victor's car
And the low puppetry of thrones, to muse
On that blest triumph, when the Patriot Sage
Called the red lightnings from the o'er-rushing cloud
And dashed the beauteous terrors on the earth
Smiling majestic. [...]

— lines 224–237

The poem continues to introduce more of that elect group of individuals that are helping the world:

To Milton's trump
The high groves of the renovated Earth
Unbosom their glad echoes: inly hushed,
Adoring Newton his serener eye
Raises to heaven: and he of mortal kind
Wisest, he first who marked the ideal tribes
Up the fine fibres through the sentient brain.
Lo! Priestley there, patriot, and saint, and sage,
Him, full of years, from his loved native land
Statesmen blood-stained and priests idolatrous
By dark lies maddening the blind multitude
Drove with vain hate. Calm, pitying he retired,
And mused expectant on these promised years.

— lines 364–376

The poem ends optimistically with images of nature:

I discipline my young and novice thought
In ministeries of heart-stirring song,
And aye on Meditation's heaven-ward wing
Soaring aloft I breathe the empyreal air
Of Love, omnific, omnipresent Love,
Whose day-spring rises glorious in my soul
As the great Sun, when he his influence
Sheds on the frost-bound waters—The glad stream
Flows to the ray and warbles as it flows.

— lines 412–419

== Themes ==
Religious Musings deals with many political and religious issues with topics including the British Parliament, slavery, God and the French Revolution, property rights, and atheism. One of the issues within the poem and in Coleridge's lectures in 1794 and 1795 was to criticize the notion that peace could be won during the French Revolution through aggressive action by England. Also, the poem describes problems with society that include crime, prostitution, disease, and other forms of suffering. The poet can conquer these problems, but only in his own imagination. Changes to the text from the various versions remove the poem's original claim that individuals can better the world. He does praise those that help, including Newton, Hartley, Priestly, and others, but puts any notion of changing the world as more contemplative than actual.

Many of the religious images are similar to those in the Book of Revelation, including an emphasis on a New Heaven and New Earth that would eventually come. By using the Book of Revelation, Coleridge removes the possibility for a golden age from occurring after the French Revolution. The poem also undermines the actuality of there being a golden age, as the concept becomes more of a contemplative act than any event that will actually happen. However, there is the idea of atonement possible for humanity within the poem. The atonement present within the poem is through the use of imagination to realise that one's self is united to the rest of humanity, known as One Life.

== Critical reception ==
Coleridge's friend and schoolmate Charles Lamb wrote in 1796 to say, "I have re-read [Religious Musings] in a more favourable moment, and hesitate not to pronounce it sublime. If there be anything in approaching to timidity [...] it is the gigantic hyperbole by which you describe the evils of existing society." He continues: "I have read all your Rel. Musings with uninterrupted feelings of profound admiration. You may safely rest your fame on it." Later, Lamb told Coleridge to simplify the language within the poem. However, Wordsworth emphasised that some of the best lines were those that weren't simple.

During the late 20th-century, Richard Holmes points out, in regard to the early reviews, that "it was the Miltonic pieces — 'Chatterton', 'Religious Musings', and 'The Songs of the Pixies' — which drew most comment, much of it favourable. But the praise was polite rather than perceptive; no reviewer was prepared to tackle the apocalyptic mixture of religion and politics in 'Religious Musings'". A review for the 1796 Analytical Review declares that the poem is "chiefly valuable for the importance of the sentiments which it contains, and the ardour which they are expressed". John Aikin's review in the 1796 Monthly Review argues that the poem "is reserved for the conclusion: and properly so, since its subject, and the manner of treating it, place it on the top of the scale of sublimity." John Bowring, in an 1830 review in the Westminster Review discussing the One Life concept present within the poem, wrote, "If there has ever been a pure and true theology upon earth-a theology which can abide the strictest application of the rules of ratiocination to its evidences, and of the principle of utility to its influences, it is that inculcated in the 'Religious Musings'".

In 1981, David Aers, Jonathan Cook, and David Punter view Religious Musings in terms of Coleridge's other political poems and claim, "Although the position arrived at by the end of 'France: an Ode' is recognisably different from, and, in an important sense, more decisive than the awkward social engagement of 'Religious Musings', the two poems can be read as different moments within the same poetic mode, a mode which can incorporate both Coleridge's radicalism and his withdrawal from political concerns." Later, Rosemary Ashton claims that the poem "is little more than poeticized opinion, a blank verse, iambic pentameter runthrough of ideas familiar from his lectures and letters [...] Musings' is hardly an appropriate description of the sustained tone of righteous horror in the poem." Richard Cronin argues that "the poem, as it subtitle acknowledges, signally fails to embody in itself the kind of whole that it celebrates. It remains a fragmentary poem that lauds the process by which fragments collapse into unity." He continues, "Religious Musings is at once a poem spoken by a prophet, from a command height, and a poem made up of a series of bulletins scribbled down by someone caught up in the press of events, and the difficulty of defining whom the poem is spoken by is matched by the difficulty of deciding whom it is spoken to."
