= To the River Otter =

Sonnet by Samuel Taylor Coleridge

"To the River Otter" is a sonnet by Samuel Taylor Coleridge. Though its date of creation is uncertain, it was possibly composed in 1793. It deals with the image of the River Otter, near Coleridge's childhood home in Devon.

== Background ==
Editions of Coleridge's works edited by James Dykes Campbell (1899) and by E. H. Coleridge (1912) determine that the "To the River Otter" is from 1793. However, J. C. C. Mays (2001) argues that there is no certainty for the earlier dating as the poem does not appear in Coleridge's 1796 collection of poems and was not described as "juvenilia" in his later collections. The first 11 lines were used in Coleridge's 1796 poem "Recollection" and published as a sonnet in the late 1796 Sonnets from Various Authors. The poem was eventually republished in Coleridge's 1797 collection of poems and in all of the later collections. "Recollections" was published 2 April 1796 in Coleridge's periodical The Watchman.

== Poem ==
The sonnet portrays a view of the river Otter from a child's perspective:

Sink the sweet scenes of childhood, that mine eyes
I never shut amid the sunny ray,
But straight with all their tints thy waters rise,
Thy crossing plank, thy marge with willows grey,
And bedded sand that vein'd with various dyes
Gleam'd through thy bright transparence! [...]

— lines 6–11

The final line ends with a regretful use of "ah" that is common to Coleridge's poems:

Ah! that once more I were a careless Child!

— line 14

=== Recollections ===
"Recollections" is a complete poem made up of lines from three of Coleridge's poems: "Absence: A Poem", "To the River Otter", and "Anna and Harland". The lines contain little alteration. Lines 13 and 17–26 are variations of lines 1–11 of "To the River Otter":

Dear native brook! where first young Poesy
...
How many various-fated years have past,
What blissful and what anguish'd hours, since last
I skimm'd the smooth thin stone along thy breast
Numb'ring its light leaps! Yet so deep imprest
Sink the sweet scenes of childhood, that mine eyes
I never shut amid the sunny blaze,
But straight, with all their tints, thy waters rise,
The crossing plank, and margin's willowy maze,
And bedded sand, that, vein'd with various dyes,
Gleam'd thro' thy bright transparence to the gaze—

— lines 13, 17–26

== Themes ==
Coleridge, while writing the poem, focused on the sonnet form and sought to recreate the poetry of William Lisle Bowles while he put together a collection of his own poems, those of Bowles, Charles Lloyd, and others. The ideas within the poem is thematically connected to Bowles's To the River Wensbeck, To Evening, and To the River Itchen. Bowles's and Coleridge's poems are part of the larger tradition of 18th-century poems dealing with rivers, including many poems within Egerton Brydges's Sonnets and Other Poems, Charlotte Smith's Elegiac Sonnets, and Thomas Warton's To the River Lodon. These, in turn, establish the tradition that William Wordsworth's Tintern Abbey would later join. The opening of Tintern Abbey is related to how Coleridge opens "To the River Otter" and how Warton opens "To the River Lodon".

According to William K. Wimsatt, nature is connected to humanity, and the poem relies on the river to talk about childhood. However, Hendrik Rookmaaker points out that there is little evidence to read the poem in such a manner. There is little justification for the reader to find an unconscious meaning to the poem, and indeed, such a reading would go against the way nature is used within the poem; nature is greater than humanity, and the Romantics like Coleridge are trying to find meaning within nature and are searching for the divine within nature. James McKusick argues that the transparency of nature within the poem allows for the narrator to witness what is hidden within nature, which is "specifically the intense awareness of a child peering into the shimmering depths of a wild, free-flowing river."

== Critical response ==
A review in the July 1798 Critical Review only says in regard to the poem, "From the new sonnets we select that which is addressed to the river Otter, as it will gratify those who love to refer to the scenes of early enjoyment".

In 1975, Wimsatt points out that "What is of great importance to note is that Coleridge's own sonnet 'To the River Otter' (while not a completely successful poem) shows a remarkable intensification of such [metaphorical] color." Later, M. H. Abrams, addressing Coleridge's use of Bowles as a source to imitate, says, "Why Coleridge should have been moved to idolatry by so slender, if genuine, a talent as that of Bowles has been an enigma of literary history." At the end of the 20th-century, Jack Stillinger argues, in regard to the 1797 edition of Coleridge's works, that "Apart from the addition of works by Lamb and Lloyd, 1797 contains ten new poems by Coleridge, of which Sonnet to the River Otter and Reflections on Having Left a Place of Retirement are the most important."
