= To Lord Stanhope =

Poem written by Samuel Taylor Coleridge

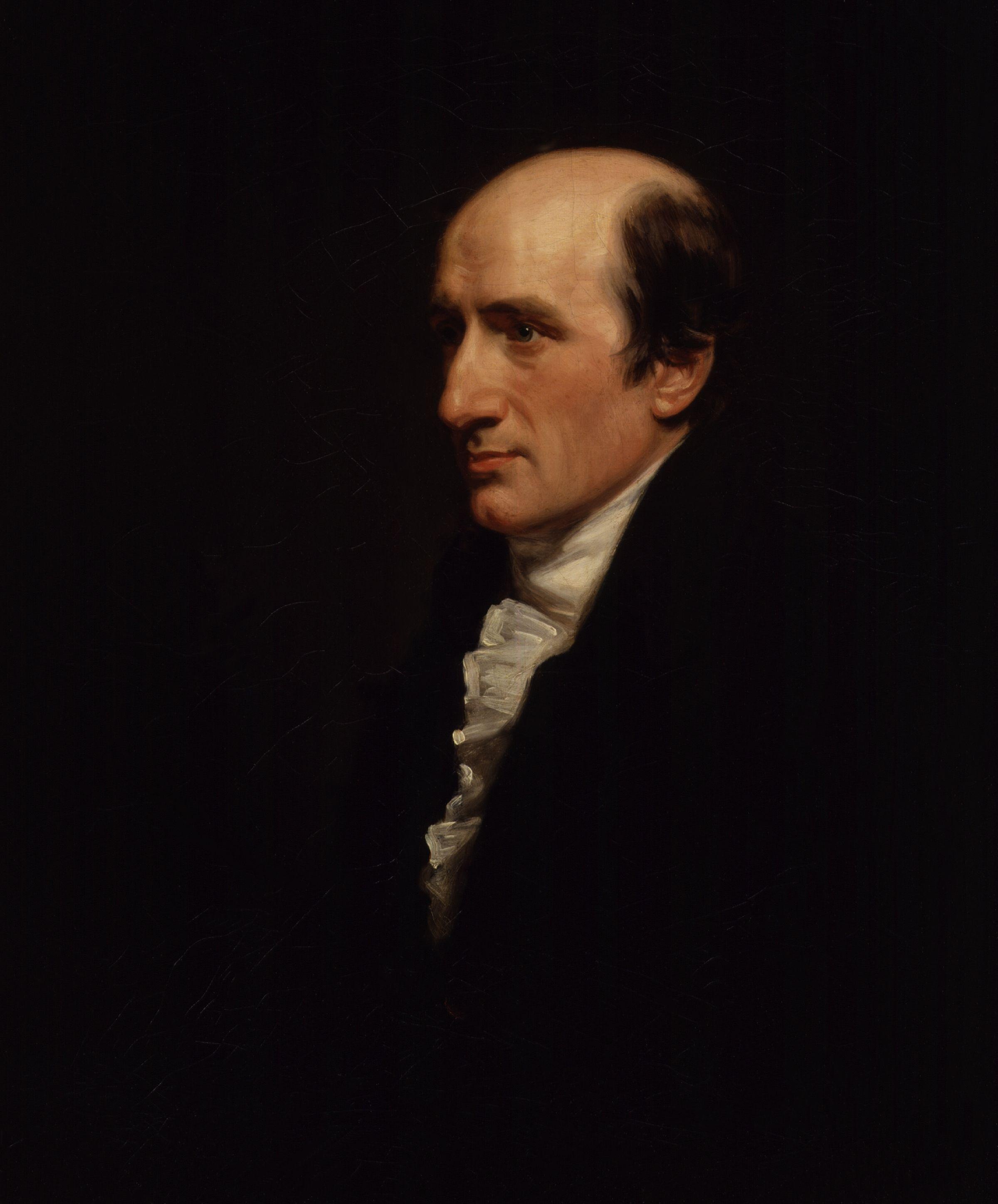
Charles Stanhope, 3rd Earl Stanhope (by John Opie)

"To Lord Stanhope" is a poem written by Samuel Taylor Coleridge. It was published in his 1796 collection of poems. The subject, Charles Stanhope, 3rd Earl Stanhope, had originally shared political views with Coleridge, but as time passed, Coleridge's views gradually shifted. By 1803, Coleridge was claiming that he did not want the poem published anymore and that it was originally intended to mock those who held the beliefs which Coleridge had held years earlier. It is part of the Sonnets on Eminent Characters series, although it was not published in the Morning Chronicle unlike the others in the series. There is, however, a possible predecessor sonnet to the 1796 version that some editors have attributed to Coleridge.

== Background ==
Coleridge had an 11-sonnet series in the Morning Chronicle titled Sonnets on Eminent Characters, which ran between 1 December 1794 and 29 January 1795. Early on, Coleridge told Robert Southey, in an 11 December 1794 letter, that 10 of the sonnets were completed and 6 were planned. After the 11th was written, the series was stopped. In a 10 March 1795 letter to George Dyer, Coleridge stated that he planned five more poems, with only one addressed to Lord Stanhope being written. The first appearance of the poem was in Coleridge's 1796 collection of poems and not in the Morning Chronicle like the original series. During the early 1790s, Coleridge held many radical political beliefs, including a system of government called Pantisocracy. However, after plans for a Pantisocratic community fell apart, Coleridge's opinions radically shifted to something similar to what was being promoted by Stanhope.

Unlike his brother-in-law the Prime Minister William Pitt, Stanhope supported the French Revolution, which earned him praise. Previously, Coleridge had attacked Pitt's views as being against liberty. However, by the time Coleridge would have had the poem printed for his 1796 collection of poems, he changed his mind on Stanhope and the poem was not to be reprinted in later collections. However, it still was printed in the 1803 collection. In a note to Sara Hutchingson's copy of the 1803 edition of Coleridge's poetry, Coleridge stated, "Infamous Insertion! It was written in ridicule of Jacobinical [bombast], put into the first Edition by a blunder of Cottle's, rejected indignantly from the second—& here maliciously reprinted in my Absence."

Another poem, To Lord Stanhope on Reading his Late Protest in the House of Lords, written under the name "One of the People" and printed in the 31 January 1795 Morning Chronicle, was also attributed to Coleridge. The attribution of the poem to Coleridge has been argued as the precursor to the 1796 edition of the poem while other editors have disputed it and authorship is uncertain. Another sonnet, "Written on Contemplating a Very Fine Setting Sun. To Lord Stanhope" was printed in the 21 February 1795 Cambridge Intelligencer. Although it has been argued as possibly being Coleridge's, it too cannot be definitively attributed as his.

== Poem ==
The 1796 edition of the poem reads:

Not, STANHOPE! with the Patriot's doubtful name
I mock thy worth—FRIEND OF THE HUMAN RACE!
Since scorning Faction's low and partial aim
Aloof thou wendest in thy stately pace,
Thyself redeeming from that leprous stain,
NOBILITY: and aye unterrify'd
Pourest thine Abdiel warnings on the train
That sit complotting with rebellious pride
GAinst her, who from the Almighty's bosom leapt
With whirlwind arm, fierce Minister of Love!
Wherefore, ere Virtue o'er thy tomb hath wept,
Angels shall lead thee to the Throne above:
And thou from forth it's clouds shalt hear the voice
Champion of FREEDOM and her God! rejoice!

The poem published on 31 January and attributed to Coleridge reads:

STANHOPE! I hail, with ardent Hymn, thy name!
Thou shalt be bless'd and lov'd, when in the dust
Thy corse shall moulder—Patriot pure and just!
And o'er thy tomb the grateful hand of FAME
Shall grave:—'Here sleeps the Friend of Humankind!'
For thou, untainted by CORRUPTION'S bowl,
Or foul AMBITION, with undaunted soul
Hast spoke the language of a Free-born mind
Pleading the cause of Nature! Still pursue
Thy path of Honour!—To thy Country true,
Still watch th' expiring flame of Liberty!
O Patriot! still pursue thy virtuous way,
As holds his course the splendid Orb of Day,
Or thro' the stormy or the tranquil sky!

== Themes ==
The Sonnets on Eminent Characters contained many poems dedicated to those whom Coleridge considered his heroes, along with two whom he did not favour. Coleridge claimed that the poem was supposed to be taken ironically, but there is little evidence that he originally wanted it removed from his collections. Instead, his feelings on the poem are possibly only a retrospective reaction to the poem's content. If the 31 January sonnet is Coleridge's, then it would represent Coleridge's feelings at the time about (as Gurion Taussig describes) Stanhope's "arguments in the tones of sensibility and its appeal to man's innate natural rights. As such, the 'friend of Humankind' represents a sentimental figure, free from artificial social prejudices or desires like 'AMBITION' that would limit his instinctive affections."

This idea appears in the 1796 edition of the poem with an emphasis on friend of the human race being a general love for mankind. Coleridge ranks the person who is friend of mankind above those who are merely patriots, as the friend is a truly democratic individual. This view continued in a March 1796 The Watchman essay by Coleridge which read: "Earl Stanhope does not talk only: he feels, and acts in contempt of aristocratic prejudices. Mr. Taylor, the son of an Apothecary at Seven Oaks, in Kent, had gained the affections of his daughter. The young Lady, truly noble from the advantages of her education, did not disguise the state of her feelings, but made her father her confidant. 'Is he not honest and intelligent?' replied the Earl.-'Assuredly, I approve of your choice.'"
