= Monody on the Death of Chatterton =

Poem by Samuel Taylor Coleridge (1790)

"Monody on the Death of Chatterton" was composed by Samuel Taylor Coleridge in 1790 and was rewritten throughout his lifetime. The poem deals with the idea of Thomas Chatterton, a poet who committed suicide, as representing the poetic struggle.

== Background ==
The 1790 version was part of Coleridge's collecting his juvenilia in 1793. It was first printed in 1794 as a preface to Chatterton's Poems supposed to have been written at Bristol, by Thomas Rowley and Others, in the Fifteenth Century. The 1794 version was slightly altered, had 36 lines added to it, and was included in Coleridge's Poems on Various Subjects (1796). These changes reflect Coleridge's involvement over the summer of 1794 with Southey, his experience with his later wife Sara Fricker, and pursuing a democratic ideal society dubbed Pantisocracy. After his marriage with Fricker, his involvement with William Wordsworth and his sister, and his progressing further into a Romantic mindset, Coleridge altered the poem again for the 1797 second edition of Poems on Various Subjects.

With Wordsworth as his close poetic companion, Coleridge began to look down on the "Monody" as an inferior poem. When Southey wished to print a revised version of the poem for a work on Chatterton, Coleridge wrote:

on a life and death so full of heart-going realities as poor Chatterton's, to find such shadowy nobodies as cherub-winged Death, Trees of Hope, bare-bosomed Affection and simpering Peace, makes one's blood circulate like ipecacuanha. But it is so. A young man with strong feelings is impelled to write on a particular subject, and this is all his feelings do for him. They set him upon the business and then they leave him. he has such a high idea of what poetry ought to be, that he cannot conceive that such things as natural emotions may be allowed to find a place in it; his learning, therefore, his fancy, or rather conceit, and all his powers of buckram are put on the stretch.

The "Monody" wasn't printed again until 1803 for the third edition of Poems on Various Subjects. When Coleridge collected his works in the 1817 Sibylline Leaves, he did not include "Monody". It was not until the 1828 edition of the work that "Monody" was added to the "Juvenile Poems" section, but it was the 1796 version although Coleridge did alter the work between 1803 and 1828. However, the 1829 edition of Sibylline Leaves did contain a revised version of "Monody". The final version of the poem appears in Coleridge's last collection of poems, which was printed in 1834 and edited by Coleridge's nephew.

== Poem ==
The poem was rewritten from 1790 until 1834 and had six versions, with the 1834 version being the edition that is commonly provided for the poem. These were not corrections to the original poem, but instead a development of the themes and ideas along with changes in style, genre, and structure. These changes parallel Coleridge's own changing view of Chatterton. The original version, from 1790, was an imitation of 18th-century poetry written for school and follows the Pindaric ode form that ignores many of the structures of the Pindaric ode. The versions in-between shift to a more Romantic structure and then finally become Augustan in the final version. As a whole, the poems can be broken into three sets: the 1790 Pindaric ode, the Romantic odes from 1794 until 1829, and the elegy from 1829 until the final publication in 1834.

=== 1790 version ===
The 1790 "Monody" is a loose Pindaric ode contain 8 stanzas with a semi-regular iambic meter. It begins with the Muse prompting the narrator to sing of Chatterton, and narrator poet responds by describing Chatterton's death:

When Want and cold Neglect had chill'd thy soul,
Athirst for Death I see thee drench the bowl!
Thy corpse of many a livid hue
On the bare ground I view,
Whilst various passions all my mind engage;

— lines 5–9

After describing Chatterton's fate and lamenting over his fate, the narrator begins to identify himself with Chatterton. Soon after, the poem returns to Chatterton's death, and the narrator implores Chatterton to help him attain a divine status:

Whether th' eternal Throne around,
Amidst the blaze of Cherubim,
Thou pourest forth the grateful hymn,
Or, soaring through the blest Domain,
Enraptur'st Angels with thy strain,—
Grant me, like thee, the lyre to sound,
Like thee, with fire divine to glow—
But ah! when rage the Waves of Woe,
Grant me with firmer breast t'oppose their hate,
And soar beyond the storms with upright eye elate!

— lines 81–90

Of the final two lines Coleridge said, in a note to the 1823 copy of the first version, that they contain "a sentiment which in his cooler moments he would have abhor'd the thought of".

=== 1794 version ===
Coleridge removed the Pindaric ode and replaced it with a Romantic elegy structured by heroic couplets. Only 17 lines carry over into the new version. The poem begins not with the muse but with Death, but little of the overall structure changes until the end's discussion of Chatterton wandering and inspiration:

Here far from Men amid this pathless grove,
In solemn thought the Minstrel wont to rove,
Like Star-beam on the rude sequester'd Tide
Lone-glittering, thro' the Forest's murksome pride.

And here in Inspiration's eager Hour,
When most the big soul feels the mad'ning Power,
These wilds, these caverns roaming o'er,
Round which the screaming Sea-gulls soar,
With wild unequal steps he pass'd along,
Oft pouring on the winds a broken song:
Anon upon some rough Rock's fearful Brow,
Would pause abrupt–and gaze upon the waves below.

— lines 86–97

=== 1796 versions ===
The 1796 version of "Monody" is similar to the 1794 and reproduces most of the content with the addition of 36 lines appended to the end of the poem. The lines deal with Coleridge's involvement in 1794 with Southey and their idea for a Pantisocracy. As such, there is a stronger connection between Coleridge's life and Chatterton's. After saying goodbye to Chatterton, he states that he must shift the theme to avoid thoughts of suicide:

But dare no longer on the sad theme muse,
Lest kindred woes persuade a kindred doom:
For oh! big gall-drops, shook from FOLLY'S wing,
Have blacken'd the fair promise of my spring;
And the stern FATE transpierc'd with viewless dart
The last pale Hope, that shiver'd at my heart!

Hence, gloomy thoughts! no more my soul shall dwell
On joys that were! No more endure to weigh
The shame and anguish of the evil day,
Wisely forgetful! [...]

— lines 112–121

There is also an introduction of Chatterton joining Coleridge, Southey, and the Pantisocratic government to live happily together:

Sure thou would'st spread the canvas to the gale,
And love, with us, the tinkling team to drive
O'er peaceful Freedom's UNDIVIDED dale;
And we, at sober eve, would round thee throng,
Hanging, enraptur'd, on thy stately song!

— lines 127–131

In the final lines, Chatterton is no longer Chatterton but Coleridge's own Romantic identity:

Alas vain Phantasies! the fleeting brood
Of Woe self-solac'd in her dreamy mood!
Yet will I love to follow the sweet dream,
Where Susquehannah pours his untam'd stream;
And on some hill, whose forest-frowning side
Waves o'er the murmurs of his calmer tide,
Will raise a solemn CENOTAPH to thee,
Sweet Harper of time-shrouded MINSTRELSY!
And there, sooth'd sadly by the dirgeful wind,
Muse on the sore ills I had left behind.

— lines 134–143

=== 1797 and 1803 versions ===
Coleridge began his 1797 edition of poems with a preface that made clear what kind of alterations would be made to all of his poems, including "Monody":

I return my acknowledgements to the different Reviewers for their assistance, which they have afforded me, in detecting my poetic deficiencies. I have endeavoured to avail myself of their remarks... My poems have been rightly charged with a profusion of double-epithets, and a general turgidness. I have pruned the double-epithets with no sparing hand; and used my best efforts to tame the swell and glitter both of thought and diction.

However, the 1796 and 1797 are similar except for a few removed double-epithets and some other minor changes. Likewise, the 1797 version and the 1803 version are similar except that Coleridge removed a 16 line passage and 3 other lines.

=== 1829 and 1834 versions ===
The 1829 version opened with 15 new lines which rely on Chatterton as an image of Coleridge's own response to his inevitable death:

O what a wonder seems the fear of death,
Seeing how gladly we all sink to sleep,
Babes, Children, Youths, and Men,
Night following night for threescore years and ten!
But doubly strange, where life is but a breath
To sigh and pant with, up Want's ragged steep.

Away, Grim Phantom! Scorpion King, away!
Reserve they terrors and thy stings display
For coward Wealth and Guilt in robes of State!
Lo! by the grave I stand of one, for whom
A prodigal Nature and a niggard Doom
(That all bestowing, this withholding all)
Made each chance knell from distant spire or dome
Sound like a seeking Mother's anxious call,
Return, poor Child! Home, weary Truant, home!

— lines 1–15

Some other stanzas are added and recast to emphasise a connection between Coleridge and Chatterton. This blending of identities continues when the poem describes Chatterton in heaven and then the experience of a harsh reality:

And now his cheeks with deeper ardors flame,
His eyes have glorious meanings, that declare
More than the light of outward day shines there,
A holier triumph and a sterner aim!
Wings grow within him; and he soars above
Or Bard's or Minstrel's lay of war or love.
[...]
For thee in vain all heavenly aspects smil'd;
From the hard world brief respite could they win—
The frost nipp'd sharp without, the canker prey'd within!

— lines 52–57, 69–71

The only other alteration in the poem is a readdition of four lines discussing "the fair promise of my spring", the return to the elegy format with an emphasis on rhyming couplets similar to those of Alexander Pope and Samuel Johnson, and the re-addition of double-epithets into the poem. The 1834 version, the final version of "Monody", is similar to the 1829 version of the poem with the addition of 11 lines. These 11 lines were the final 11 lines of the 1790 version:

O spirit blest!
Whether the Eternal's throne around,
Amidst the blaze of Seraphim,
Thou pourest forth the grateful hymn,
Or soaring thro' the blest domain
Enrapturest Angels with thy strain,—
Grant me, like thee, the lyre to sound,
Like thee with fire divine to glow;—
But ah! when rage the waves of woe,
Grant me with firmer breast to meet their hate,
And soar beyond the storm with upright eye elate!

— lines 103–113

This addition was probably not done by Coleridge and does not match the rhythm of the rest of the poem. Instead, it is possible that Coleridge's nephew took lines from the original poem and added it to the 1829 edition when editing the 1834 collection of poems.

== Themes ==
The original version contains hints of Romantic themes when it mourns the death of Chatterton. Coleridge was influenced by John Milton's Lycidas, Gray's Elegy Written in a Country Churchyard, and the poetry of both William Bowles and Thomas Warton. Gray's particular influence was in word choice and Coleridge's incorporating the image of Chatterton as a young poet. Warton's The Suicide provides a connection to Chatterton by describing a poor poet killing himself. Although Warton made it clear that he was not thinking of Chatterton when composing the poem, Coleridge believed that there was a connection, and he believed that Warton's depiction was too unfavourable towards Chatterton. Coleridge was personally affected by the idea of Chatterton's death and how the poet was ruined by debt. Of the later point, Coleridge knew of poverty affecting many poets that he admired along with having a lot of experience with his own debt and poverty.

The second edition shows a stronger influence of Gray and the elegy form. Gray's The Bard influences the poem's discussion of Chatterton as a poet, the Elegy influences the poem's discussion of Chatterton's solitude, and The Progress of Poesy influences the discussion of Chatterton's youth. Like Gray's poetry, the poem relies heavily upon personification and Coleridge borrows phrases from Gray. Even Coleridge's Chatterton and Gray's Bard share a similar character that is only separated by the actual biographical events of Chatterton's life and death. However, the 1767 revision begins to drop Gray as an influence and substitutes Wordsworth in his place. Wordsworth's influence did not directly affect the poem, but instead caused Coleridge to think of the poem as part of his childhood poems and not part of his mature work. Although he did revise the work again for the 1803 edition, his estimation of the poem did not improve. It was not until 1829 that Coleridge began to identify himself with Chatterton again.

Within the final version of the poem, Coleridge transitions abruptly from a discussing a painful theme, a technique that is common to the ode. Later, he develops this transition further in his poem "Dejection". The ode form allowed Coleridge to create stand alone stanzas that create contrasts with other stanzas, and the reliance on a speaker within the poem provides a psychological dimension to these changes.

== Critical reception ==
Charles Lamb did not like the changes incorporated in the 1796 edition of "Monody" and told Coleridge "I rather wish you had left the monody on Chatterton concluding as it did abruptly. It had more of unity" and, later, "I am not quite satisfied with the Chatterton, and with your leave shall try my hand at it again. A master joiner, you know, may leave a cabinet to be finished, when his own hands are full" but Coleridge refused any of his suggestions.

During the late 19th century, J. D. Campbell points out that "'Monody' was one of the first poems (if not the first) of any importance composed by Coleridge, and, down to the end of his life, he never missed an opportunity of tinkering it".

In 1942, I. A. Gordon declared that "Coleridge's Monody on the Death of Chatterton can never be regarded as one of his greatest poems, but it can lay a fair claim to be considered one of his most interesting; and in one respect at least it is unique. The Monody took him no less than forty-four years to beat into its final form, and if we can credit his statement that some lines of it were written 'in his thirteenth year as a school exercise' the forty-four years are stretched to almost fifty." By 1975, Samuel Chew and Richard Altick declared: "[Coleridge's] addiction to 'turgid ode and tumid stanza,' clogged with pompous rhetoric and frigid personification, is evident in the Destruction of the Bastille (1789) [...] and in the Monody on the Death of Chatterton which was later (1794) completely rewritten.".
