= To a Young Ass =

Poem by Samuel Taylor Coleridge (1794)

To a Young Ass was composed by Samuel Taylor Coleridge in 1794. The poem describes Coleridge's sympathies for animals and the connection to nature he felt as part of his idea of Pantisocracy. It was later used by critics as a means to mock him.

== Background ==
The poem "To a Young Jack Ass" or "To a Young Ass, Its Mother Being Tethered Near It" was composed during October 1794. It was inspired by a scene of a jack ass at Jesus Green. Soon after, the poem was published in the Morning Chronicle 9 December 1794 and marks the first time that Coleridge publicly talks about his idea of Pantisocracy. The poem was published in Coleridge's 1796 edition of poems and was revised for the 1797 edition. These later editions alter lines 27–36 to remove mention of Pantisocracy.

== Poem ==
The poem begins by addressing the oppressed foal:

Poor little Foal of an oppresséd race!
I love the languid patience of thy face:
And oft with gentle hand I give thee bread,
And clap thy ragged coat, and pat thy head.

— lines 1–4

The foal responds to the narrator, and the two form a bond:

How askingly its footsteps hither bend?
It seems to say, "And have I then one friend?"
Innocent foal! thou poor despis'd forlorn!
I hail thee Brother—spite of the fool's scorn!

— lines 23–26

The 1794 edition of the poem included a political meaning. Lines starting at 27 originally read:

And fain I'd take thee with me, to the Dell
Where high-soul'd Pantisocracy shall dwell!
Where Mirth shall tickle Plenty's ribless side,
And smiles from Beauty's Lip on sunbeams glide,

— lines 27–30

== Themes ==
The poem links the image of a jack ass, a low form of animal, with the narrator to reverse the natural order of the world. As part of Coleridge's political concept of Pantisocracy, man would connect to nature. In a letter to Francis Wrangham, dated 24 October 1794, Coleridge wrote:

If there be any whom I deem worthy of remembrance — I am their Brother. I call even my Cat Sister in the Fraternity of universal Nature. Owls I respect & Jack Asses I love: for Alderman & Hogs, Bishops & Royston Crows, I have not particular partiality —; they are my Cousins however, at least by Courtesy. But Kings, Wolves, Tygers, Generals, Ministers, & Hyaenas, I renounce them all... May the Almighty Pantisocratizer of Souls pantisocratize the Earth, and bless you and S. T. Coleridge.

The poem was built off this playful idea and includes a mix of comedy along with a connection between the narrator and the jack ass that was part of "an oppressed Race". The response by the narrator is to feel compassion with an animal in distress, and he seeks to comfort the animal. In this view, Coleridge contradicts Godwin's and Mary Wollstonecraft's belief that you cannot befriend animals. Their argument is based on the idea that reason is needed to understand virtue, but Coleridge focuses on the emotional response that creates a bond between man and animal.

The poem does rely on the ideas of Pantisocracy, being connected to nature, and the idea of "One Life" that would appear in many of his later poems. However, the revised version removes the mention of Pantisocracy. The lines made light of Pantisocracy, and some later critics, including William Empson, feel that Coleridge removed the lines because Coleridge was afraid of the public laughing at his ideas. However, Zachary Leader argues that "he wanted them laughed at. He just did not want them laughed at the wrong way."

== Sources ==
This was a common image in the 18th-century, with many philosophers and writers, including Godwin, William Shield, and others, releasing their horses and mules to walk alongside them. A direct literary connection is to William Crowe's "To an Ass" (1793) and the poem incorporates a quote from William Shakespeare's Hamlet. The idea of connecting with a lowly form of animal also appears in many literary works, including Robert Burns poems (example – "To a Mouse"), Southey's poems (example – "To a Spider"), the works of Laurence Sterne (both Tristram Shandy and A Sentimental Journey) and Cervantes's Don Quixote.

== Response ==
Richard Holmes, Coleridge's 20th-century biographer, points out that, in Coleridge's 1796 collection, "The poem which had the most popular impact remained the controversial 'To a Young Jack Ass'." The poem inspired James Gillray to poke fun at Coleridge, William Godwin, and Robert Southey by depicting them with the ears of a jack ass in a caricature titled "New Morality" in the July 1798 Anti-Jacobin Magazine. Likewise, James and Horace Smith parodied the poem in a piece called "Play house Musings". Lord Byron would mention the Gillray image in his English Bards and Scotch Reviewers series later. Of the criticism, Coleridge was not bothered by anything except Gillray's description under the illustration that contained a negative biographical description, claiming that Coleridge was a deist while at Cambridge and that he left England and his family to explore the world.
