= 1798 in literature =

This article contains information about the literary events and publications of 1798.

== Events ==
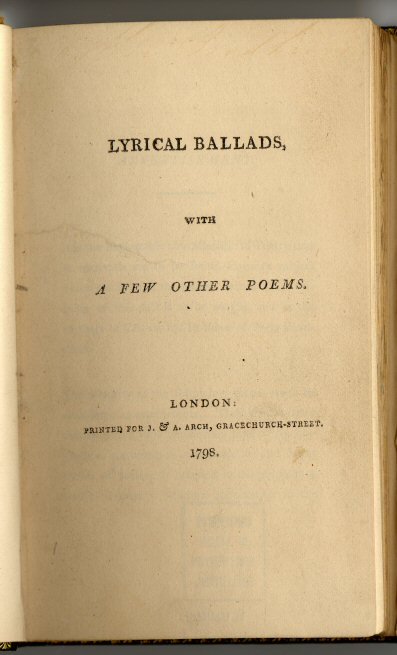
1st London edition of Wordsworth and Coleridge's Lyrical Ballads

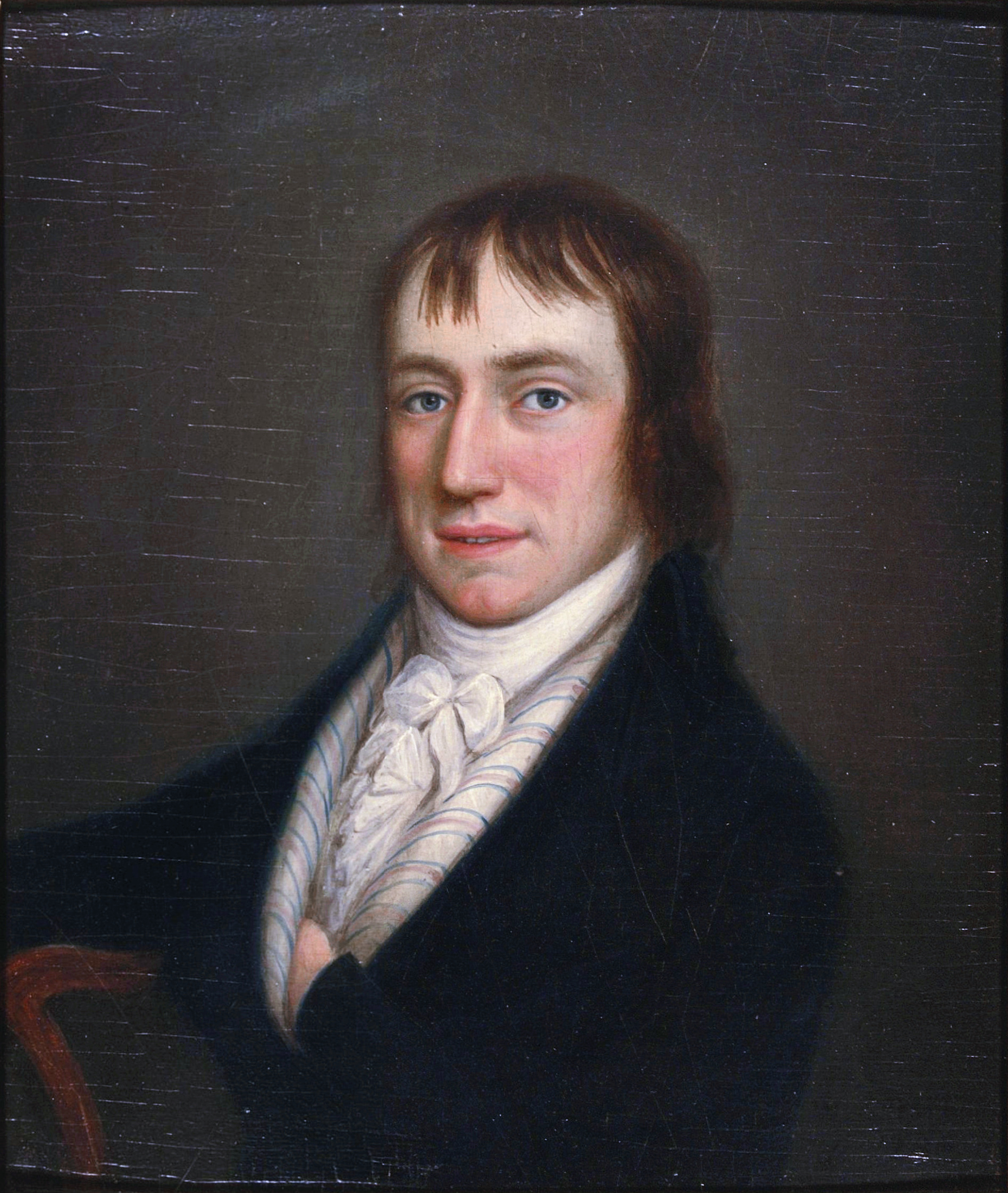
Wordsworth in 1798

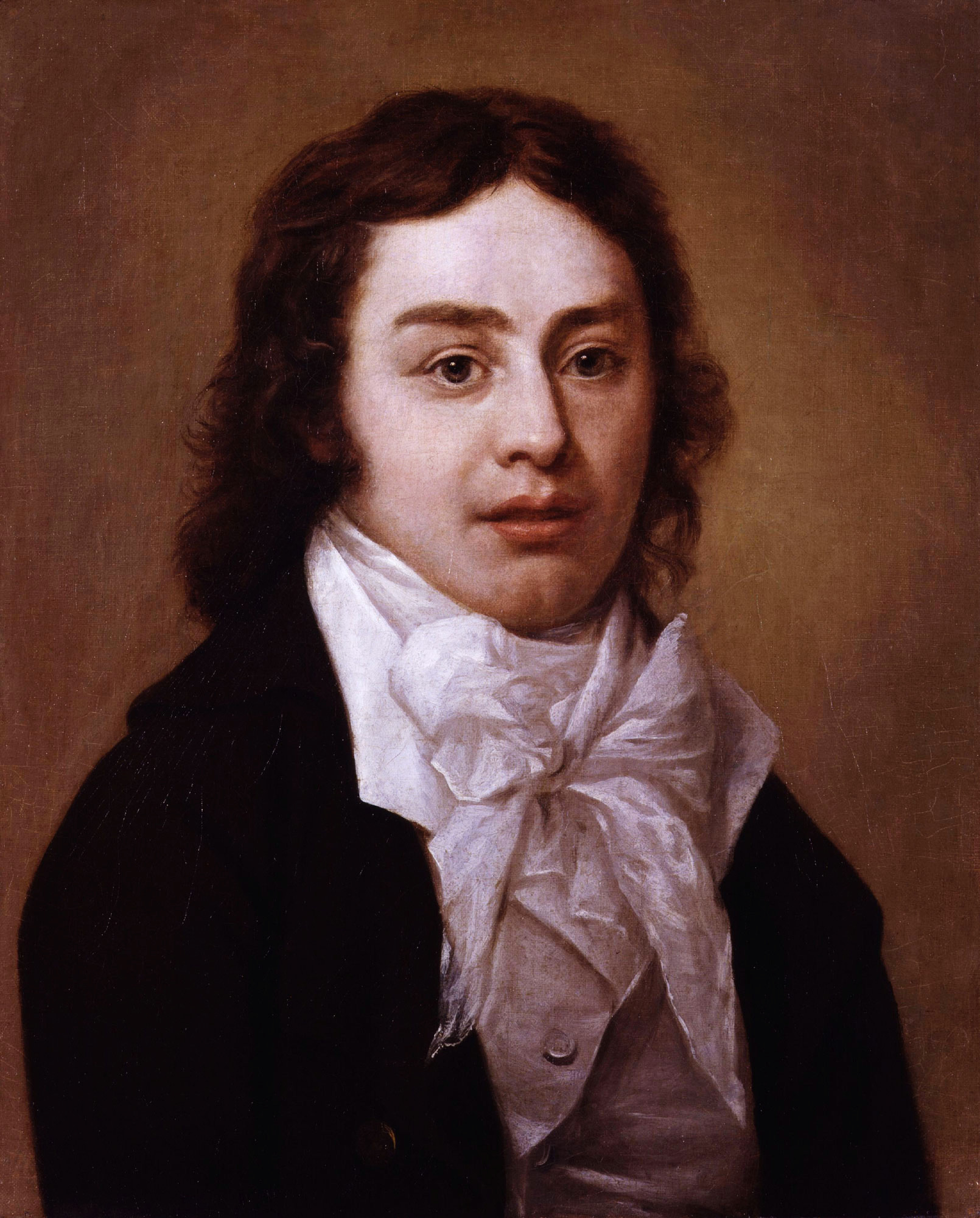
Coleridge in the 1790s

- February – Samuel Taylor Coleridge writes the conversation poem "Frost at Midnight", commonly seen as the best of the series. Coleridge described to Thomas Poole aspects of his childhood at Christ's Hospital school that are similar to the content of the poem. The rest comes from Coleridge's experience with his friend, William Wordsworth. It was Wordsworth who provided Coleridge with a detailed description of the Lake District which served as a basis for Coleridge's own description of the place. The relationship between Coleridge and Wordsworth was a close friendship, and Coleridge helped rewrite many of Wordsworth's poems during this time. Frost at Midnight was later connected to many of Wordsworth's poems. The poem was published in a small work containing his other poems France: An Ode and Fears in Solitude.
- April – Coleridge writes the conversation poems "Fears in Solitude" ("Written ... During the Alarm of an Invasion", soon published in a pamphlet) and "The Nightingale". Although Coleridge was opposed to the British government under the then-prime minister William Pitt the Younger, he supported the British nation and the national defense when the French First Republic threatened to invade the Kingdom of Great Britain; the belief held by many Britons was that France would invade the Kingdom of Ireland, which was experiencing rebellion at the time. These fears of an invasion manifested in April 1798, and Britons began to arm themselves. In April, Coleridge traveled to his childhood home at Ottery and then went to visit William and Dorothy Wordsworth; during this time Coleridge wrote "Fears in Solitude: Written in April 1798, During the Alarm of an Invasion".
- April 16 – Coleridge's "The Recantation: An Ode" appears in The Morning Post, describing his disillusionment with the French Revolution, in reaction to the then-ongoing French invasion of Switzerland (January–May, 1798). Alongside the poem was a note from Daniel Stuart, the paper's editor, which stated that, like Coleridge, the paper also switched its position on France: "The following excellent Ode will be in unison with the feelings of every friend to Liberty and foe to Oppression; of all who, admiring the French Revolution, detest and deplore the conduct of France towards Switzerland."
- April 30 – Richard Cumberland's comedy The Eccentric Lover is first performed at the Covent Garden Theatre in London. The original cast included William Thomas Lewis as Sir Francis Delroy, John Quick as Peter Crowfoot, Joseph George Holman as Fenton, Joseph Shepherd Munden as Admiral Delroy, John Fawcett as Doctor Crisis, Charles Murray as Gangrene, John Whitfield as Sir Henry Netterville, Julia Betterton as Eleanor de Ferrars, Jane Pope as Constantia and Isabella Mattocks as Fidelia.
- September 18 – Lyrical Ballads, with a Few Other Poems by William Wordsworth and Samuel Taylor Coleridge is first published anonymously in Bristol by Joseph Cottle (who also remains anonymous), marking the beginning of English literary Romanticism. Most of the poems are by Wordsworth, including Lines composed a few miles above Tintern Abbey on revisiting the banks of the Wye during a tour, 13 July 1798, but also opening with the first publication of Coleridge's The Rime of the Ancyent Marinere, whose first London publication is on October 4.
- October 11 – Elizabeth Inchbald's Lovers' Vows (adapted from Kotzebue's Das Kind der Liebe – the child of love) is first performed at the Theatre Royal, Drury Lane, London.
- October 12 – The rebuilt Weimarer Hoftheater are inaugurated with the first performance of the first part of Friedrich Schiller's dramatic trilogy Wallenstein: Das Lager (The Camp), directed by Goethe.
- unknown dates
  - Ivan Kotliarevsky's mock-heroic poem Eneyida (Енеїда) becomes the first printed work in the modern Ukrainian language.
  - The National Library of the Netherlands originates when the Batavian Republic opens the former library of the stadtholder to the public.
  - The Académie française publishes the 5th edition of its Dictionnaire.
  - Thomas Nelson's publishing company is established in Edinburgh as a second-hand religious bookshop.

== New books ==
=== Fiction ===
- Charles Brockden Brown
  - Alcuin: a Dialogue
  - Wieland: or, The Transformation; an American Tale
- Emily Clark – Ianthé, or the Flower of Caernarvon
- Francis Lathom – The Midnight Bell: a German story, founded on incidents in real life
- Regina Maria Roche – Clermont: a Tale
- Eleanor Sleath – The Orphan of the Rhine: a romance
- Caroline von Wolzogen (anonymously) – Agnes von Lilien (first complete book publication, in 2 vols)
- Hannah Webster Foster – The Boarding School; or, Lessons of a Preceptress to Her Pupils
- Mary Wollstonecraft – Posthumous Works (edited by William Godwin) including Maria: or, The Wrongs of Woman

=== Children ===
- François Guillaume Ducray-Duminil – Cœlina, ou l'Enfant du mystère (Celina, or the Mystery Child)
- Edward Augustus Kendall
  - Keeper's Travels in Search of His Master
  - The Sparrow. A Tale
- Richmal Mangnall (anonymously) – Historical and Miscellaneous Questions for the Use of Young People (often known as Mangnall's Questions)
- Samuel Jackson Pratt ("Selected by a Lady") – Pity's Gift: a collection of interesting tales, to excite the compassion of youth for the animal creation

=== Drama ===
- James Boaden
  - Aurelio and Miranda
  - Cambro-Britons
- Elizabeth Craven – The Georgian Princess
- Richard Cumberland –
  - The Eccentric Lover
  - A Word for Nature
- Thomas John Dibdin – The Mouth of the Nile
- Thomas Holcroft –
  - He's Much to Blame
  - The Inquisitor
  - Knave or Not?
- Elizabeth Inchbald – Lovers' Vows
- Thomas Morton
  - Secrets Worth Knowing
  - Speed the Plough
- Frederick Reynolds – Laugh When You Can
- Friedrich von Schiller – Wallensteins Lager

=== Poetry ===
- Samuel Taylor Coleridge and William Wordsworth – Lyrical Ballads
- Richard Polwhele (anonymously) – The Unsex'd Females
- The Rime of the Ancient Mariner

=== Non-fiction ===
- Nathan Drake – Literary Hours
- William Godwin – Memoirs of the Author of A Vindication of the Rights of Woman
- Edward Jenner – An Inquiry Into the Causes and Effects of the Variolæ Vaccinæ
- Thomas Malthus (anonymously) – An Essay on the Principle of Population

== Births ==
- January 5 – David Macbeth Moir, Scottish poet and humorist (died 1851)
- January 29 – Henry Neele, English poet and scholar (died 1828)
- February 12 – Catherine Gore, English novelist and dramatist (died 1861)
- February 17 – Auguste Comte, French philosopher (died 1857)
- March 30 – Luise Hensel, German religious author and poet (died 1876)
- June 29 – Count Giacomo Leopardi, Italian poet, essayist and philologist (died 1837)

== Deaths ==
- April 12 – Madeleine de Puisieux, French philosopher and feminist writer (born 1720)
- June 4 – Giacomo Casanova, Italian librarian and memoirist (born 1725)
- June 20 – Jeremy Belknap, American historian of New Hampshire (born 1744)
- December 16 – Thomas Pennant, Welsh naturalist and travel writer (born 1726)

== Sources ==
- Ashton, Rosemary. The Life of Samuel Taylor Coleridge. Oxford: Blackwell, 1997.
- Hogan, C.B (ed.) The London Stage, 1660–1800: Volume V. Southern Illinois University Press, 1968.
- Mays, J. C. C. (editor). The Collected Works of Samuel Taylor Coleridge: Poetical Works I Vol I.I. Princeton: Princeton University Press, 2001.
- Watson, George. The New Cambridge Bibliography of English Literature: Volume 2, 1660–1800. Cambridge University Press, 1971.
