= 1798 in poetry =

Nationality words link to articles with information on the nation's poetry or literature (for instance, Irish or France).

== Events ==
- July 13 – William Wordsworth's poem Lines composed a few miles above Tintern Abbey on revisiting the banks of the Wye during a tour, 13 July 1798 written.
- William Wordsworth begins writing the first version of The Prelude, finishing it in two parts in 1799. This version describes the growth of his understanding up to age 17, when he departed for Cambridge University. He would revise the poem more than once during his lifetime but not publish it. Months after his death in 1850 it was published for the first time.

== Works published ==
=== United Kingdom ===
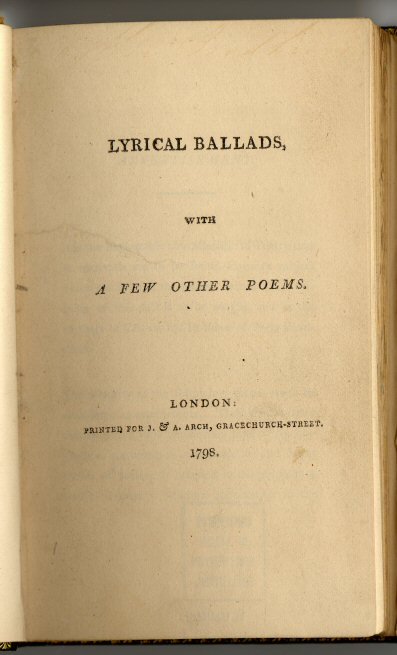
First edition title page of Wordsworth's and Coleridge's Lyrical Ballads

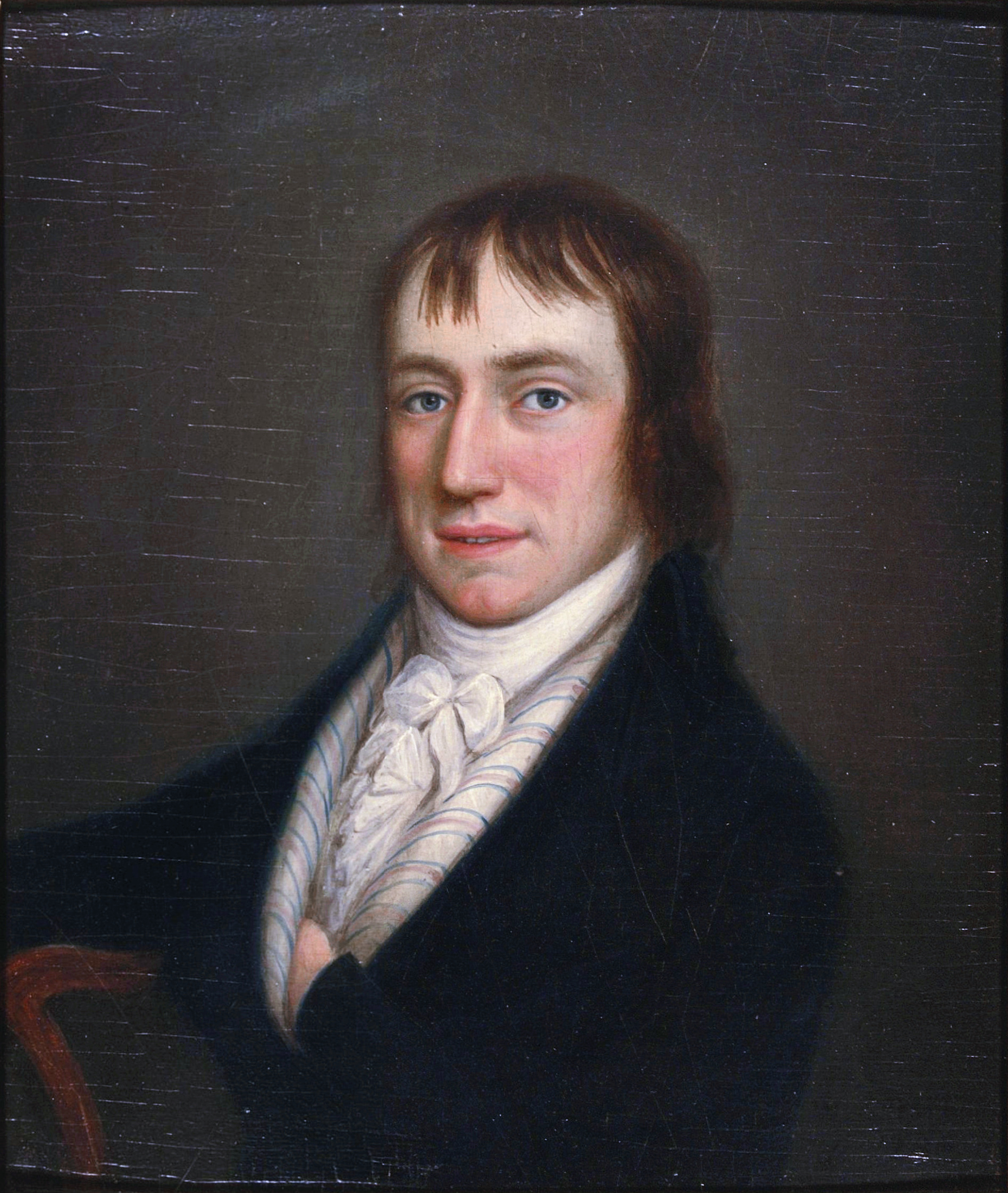
William Wordsworth in 1798, about the time he began The Prelude.

- Robert Anderson, Poems on Various Subjects
- William Lisle Bowles, St. Michael's Mount
- George Canning and J. H. Frere, The Loves of the Triangles, a parody of Erasmus Darwin's The Loves of the Plants
- Samuel Taylor Coleridge:
  - Fears in Solitude, a small pamphlet including
    - "Fears in Solitude: Written in April 1798, During the Alarm of an Invasion"
    - "France: An Ode", first published as The Recantation: An Ode and later renamed; the poem mark's Coleridge's political turn away from revolutionary France after the French invasion of Switzerland; first published in the April 16 edition of the Morning Post
    - "Frost at Midnight"
  - See William Wordsworth, below for more information on Lyrical Ballads, a collection of Coleridge's and Wordsworth's poems, including Coleridge's
    - "The Rime of the Ancyent Marinere" (title later changed to Rime of the Ancient Mariner in the 1800 edition, in which the author also dropped much of the archaic wording)
    - "The Nightingale: A Conversation Poem"
- Joseph Cottle, Malvern Hills
- William Cowper, "On the Receipt of My Mother's Picture"
- Thomas Gisborne, Poems, Sacred and Moral
- Charles Lamb and Charles Lloyd, Blank Verse, including Lamb's "The Old Familiar Faces"
- Richard Polwhele (anonymously), The Unsex'd Females
- Samuel Rogers, An Epistle to a Friend, with Other Poems
- William Sotheby, Oberon, translation from the original German of Christoph Martin Wieland
- William Wordsworth and Samuel Taylor Coleridge, published anonymously, Lyrical Ballads with a Few Other Poems (see Coleridge, above, for more on his contributions to the work; and see also Lyrical Ballads 1801, 1802, 1805 and 1815) including:
  - "Lucy Gray"
  - "Tintern Abbey"
  - "We are Seven"
  - The Lucy poems:
    - "She dwelt among the untrodden ways"
    - "A slumber did my spirit seal"
    - "Strange fits of passion have I known"
    - "Three years she grew in sun and shower"
    - "I travelled among unknown men"

=== United States ===
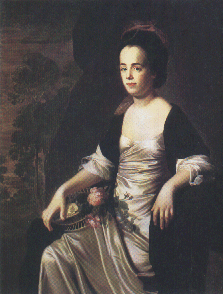
Judith Sargent Murray

- Richard Alsop, with Lemuel Hopkins and Theodore Dwight, The Political Greenhouse
- Joseph Hopkinson, "Hail Columbia", a popular patriotic song, written during the war fever against France
- William Munford, Poems and Prose on Several Occasions, including a tragedy, translations from Horace, versifications of Ossian
- Judith Sargent Murray, The Gleaner
- Robert Treat Paine, Jr., "Adams and Liberty", the author's most famous work, sung throughout the country; praising America's independence from European tyranny
- Jonathan Mitchell Sewall, Versification of President Washington's Excellent Farewell-Address

=== Other ===
- Ivan Kotliarevsky, Eneyida (Енеїда), Ukrainian
- Johann von Goethe, Hermann und Dorothea, Germany

== Births ==
Death years link to the corresponding "[year] in poetry" article:

- January 5 – David Macbeth Moir (died 1851), Scottish
- March 30 – Luise Hensel (died 1876), German
- April 8 – Dionysios Solomos Διονύσιος Σολωμός (died 1857), Greek poet best known for the Hymn to Liberty, the first two stanzas of which become the Greek national anthem
- April 19 – Andrea Maffei (died 1885), Italian poet, translator and librettist
- June 18 – McDonald Clarke (died 1842), American
- June 29 – Count Giacomo Leopardi (died 1837), Italian
- September 20 – Samuel Henry Dickson (died 1872), American poet, physician, writer and educator
- December 24 – Adam Mickiewicz (died 1855), Polish Romantic poet
- c. 1798–1800 – Charles Jeremiah Wells (died 1879), English

== Deaths ==
Birth years link to the corresponding "[year] in poetry" article:

- April 11 – Karl Wilhelm Ramler (born 1724), German poet
- May 28 – Mary Alcock (born 1742), English poet, essayist and philanthropist
- October 14 – Robert Merry (born 1755), English poet and dilettante, died in the United States.
- November 23 – David Samwell, known as Dafydd Ddu Feddyg (born 1751), Welsh naval surgeon and poet
- Also:
  - Edmund Gardner (born c. 1752), English
  - St. John Honeywood (born 1763), American
  - Waris Shah (born 1722), Punjabi Sufi poet

== See also ==
- Poetry
- List of years in poetry
- List of years in literature
- 18th century in literature
- 18th century in poetry
- Romantic poetry
