= Blank verse =

Poetry written in regular metre but without rhyme

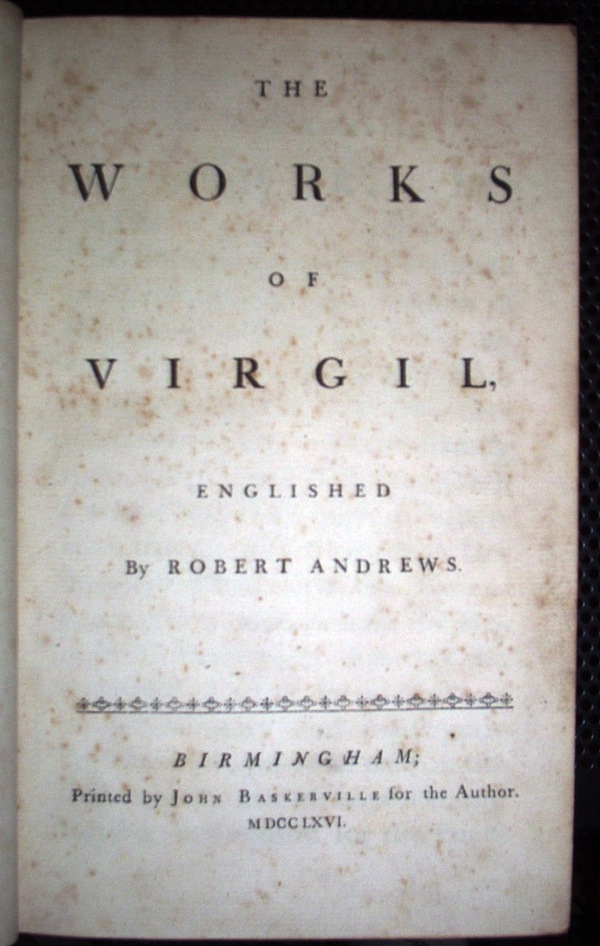
The title page of Robert Andrews' translation of Virgil into English blank verse, printed by John Baskerville in 1766

Blank verse is poetry written with regular metrical but unrhymed lines, usually in iambic pentameter. It has been described as "probably the most common and influential form that English poetry has taken since the 16th century", and Paul Fussell has estimated that "about three quarters of all English poetry is in blank verse".

The first known use of blank verse in English was by Henry Howard, Earl of Surrey in his translation of the Aeneid (composed c. 1540; published posthumously, 1554–1557). He may have been inspired by the Latin original since classical Latin verse did not use rhyme, or possibly he was inspired by Ancient Greek verse or the Italian verse form of versi sciolti, both of which also did not use rhyme.

The play Arden of Faversham (around 1590 by an unknown author) is a notable example of end-stopped blank verse.

== In English ==
The 1561 play Gorboduc by Thomas Norton and Thomas Sackville was the first English play to use blank verse.

Christopher Marlowe was the first English author to achieve critical fame for his use of blank verse. The major achievements in English blank verse were made by William Shakespeare, who wrote much of the content of his plays in unrhymed iambic pentameter, and John Milton, whose Paradise Lost is written in blank verse. Miltonic blank verse was widely imitated in the 18th century by such poets as James Thomson (in The Seasons) and William Cowper (in The Task). Romantic English poets such as William Wordsworth, Percy Bysshe Shelley, and John Keats used blank verse as a major form. Shortly afterwards, Alfred, Lord Tennyson became particularly devoted to blank verse, using it for example in his long narrative poem "The Princess", as well as for one of his most famous poems, "Ulysses". Among American poets, Hart Crane and Wallace Stevens are notable for using blank verse in extended compositions at a time when many other poets were turning to free verse.

Marlowe and then Shakespeare developed its potential greatly in the late 16th century. Marlowe was the first to exploit the potential of blank verse for powerful and involved speech:

You stars that reign'd at my nativity,
Whose infl'ence hath allotted death and hell,
Now draw up Faustus like a foggy mist
Into the entrails of yon lab'ring clouds,
That when they vomit forth into the air,
My limbs may issue from their smoky mouths,
So that my soul may but ascend to Heav'n.

— Doctor Faustus

Shakespeare developed this feature, and also the potential of blank verse for abrupt and irregular speech. For example, in this exchange from King John, one blank verse line is broken between two characters:

My lord?
A grave.
He shall not live.
Enough.

— King John, 3.3

Shakespeare also used enjambment increasingly often in his verse, and in his last plays was given to using feminine endings (in which the last syllable of the line is unstressed, for instance lines 3 and 6 of the following example); all of this made his later blank verse extremely rich and varied.

Ye elves of hills, brooks, standing lakes and groves,
And ye that on the sands with printless foot
Do chase the ebbing Neptune, and do fly him
When he comes back; you demi-puppets that
By moonshine do the green sour ringlets make
Whereof the ewe not bites; and you whose pastime
Is to make midnight mushrooms, that rejoice
To hear the solemn curfew; by whose aid,
Weak masters though ye be, I have bedimmed
The noontide sun, called forth the mutinous winds,
And 'twixt the green sea and the azured vault
Set roaring war – to the dread rattling thunder
Have I given fire, and rifted Jove's stout oak
With his own bolt;...

— The Tempest, 5.1

This very free treatment of blank verse was imitated by Shakespeare's contemporaries, and led to general metrical looseness in the hands of less skilled users. However, Shakespearean blank verse was used with some success by John Webster and Thomas Middleton in their plays. Ben Jonson, meanwhile, used a tighter blank verse with less enjambment in his comedies Volpone and The Alchemist.

Blank verse was not much used in the non-dramatic poetry of the 17th century until Paradise Lost, in which Milton used it with much license. Milton used the flexibility of blank verse, its capacity to support syntactic complexity, to the utmost, in passages such as these:

....Into what Pit thou seest
From what highth fal'n, so much the stronger provd
He with his Thunder: and till then who knew
The force of those dire Arms? yet not for those
Nor what the Potent Victor in his rage
Can else inflict do I repent or change,
Though chang'd in outward lustre; that fixt mind
And high disdain, from sence of injur'd merit,
That with the mightiest rais'd me to contend,
And to the fierce contention brought along
Innumerable force of Spirits arm'd
That durst dislike his reign, and me preferring,
His utmost power with adverse power oppos'd
In dubious Battel on the Plains of Heav'n,
And shook his throne. What though the field be lost?
All is not lost; the unconquerable Will,
And study of revenge, immortal hate,
And courage never to submit or yield:

— Paradise Lost, Book 1

Milton also wrote Paradise Regained and parts of Samson Agonistes in blank verse. In the century after Milton, there are few distinguished uses of either dramatic or non-dramatic blank verse; in keeping with the desire for regularity, most of the blank verse of this period is somewhat stiff. The best examples of blank verse from this time are probably John Dryden's tragedy All for Love and James Thomson's The Seasons. An example notable as much for its failure with the public as for its subsequent influence on the form is John Dyer's The Fleece.

At the close of the 18th century, William Cowper ushered in a renewal of blank verse with his volume of kaleidoscopic meditations, The Task, published in 1784. After Shakespeare and Milton, Cowper was the main influence on the next major poets in blank verse, teenagers when Cowper published his masterpiece. These were the Lake Poets William Wordsworth and Samuel Taylor Coleridge. Wordsworth used the form for many of the Lyrical Ballads (1798 and 1800), and for his longest efforts, The Prelude and The Excursion. Wordsworth's verse recovers some of the freedom of Milton's, but is generally far more regular:

Five years have past; five summers, with the length
Of five long winters! And again I hear
These waters, rolling from their mountain-springs
With a soft inland murmur. – Once again
Do I behold these steep and lofty cliffs...

— Lines written a few miles above Tintern Abbey, lines 1–5

Coleridge's blank verse is more technical than Wordsworth's, but he wrote little of it:

Well, they are gone, and here must I remain,
This lime-tree bower my prison! I have lost
Beauties and feelings, such as would have been
Most sweet to my remembrance even when age
had dimmed mine eyes to blindness! They, meanwhile...

— "This Lime-Tree Bower My Prison", lines 1–5

His conversation poems such as "The Eolian Harp" and "Frost at Midnight" are the best known of his blank verse works. The blank verse of Keats in Hyperion is mainly modelled on that of Milton, but takes fewer liberties with the pentameter and possesses the characteristic of Keats's verse. Shelley's blank verse in The Cenci and Prometheus Unbound is closer to Elizabethan practice than to Milton's.

Of the Victorian writers in blank verse, the most prominent are Tennyson and Robert Browning. Tennyson's blank verse in poems like "Ulysses" and "The Princess" is musical and regular; his lyric "Tears, Idle Tears" is probably the first important example of the blank verse stanzaic poem. Browning's blank verse, in poems like "Fra Lippo Lippi", is more abrupt and conversational. Gilbert and Sullivan's 1884 opera, Princess Ida, is based on Tennyson's "The Princess". Gilbert's dialogue is in blank verse throughout (although the other 13 Savoy operas have prose dialogue). Below is an extract spoken by Princess Ida after singing her entrance aria "Oh, goddess wise".

Women of Adamant, fair neophytes—
Who thirst for such instruction as we give,
Attend, while I unfold a parable.
The elephant is mightier than Man,
Yet Man subdues him. Why? The elephant
Is elephantine everywhere but here (tapping her forehead)
And Man, whose brain is to the elephant's
As Woman's brain to Man's—(that's rule of three),—
Conquers the foolish giant of the woods,
As Woman, in her turn, shall conquer Man.
In Mathematics, Woman leads the way:
The narrow-minded pedant still believes
That two and two make four! Why, we can prove,
We women—household drudges as we are—
That two and two make five—or three—or seven;
Or five-and-twenty, if the case demands!

Blank verse, of varying degrees of regularity, has been used quite frequently throughout the 20th century in original verse and in translations of narrative verse. Most of Robert Frost's narrative and conversational poems are in blank verse; so are other poems like Wallace Stevens's "The Idea of Order at Key West" and "The Comedian as the Letter C", W. B. Yeats's "The Second Coming", W. H. Auden's "The Watershed" and John Betjeman's Summoned by Bells. A complete listing is impossible, since a sort of loose blank verse has become a staple of lyric poetry, but it would be safe to say that blank verse is as prominent now as it has been any time in the past three hundred years.

== In German ==
Blank verse is also common in German literature. It was used by Gotthold Ephraim Lessing in the tragedy Nathan der Weise (Nathan the Wise) in 1779, where the lines are 10 or 11 syllables long:

Ja, Daja; Gott sei Dank! Doch warum endlich?
Hab ich denn eher wiederkommen wollen?
Und wiederkommen können? Babylon
Ist von Jerusalem, wie ich den Weg,
Seitab bald rechts, bald links, zu nehmen bin
Genötigt worden, gut zweihundert Meilen;
Und Schulden einkassieren, ist gewiss
Auch kein Geschäft, das merklich fördert, das
So von der Hand sich schlagen lässt.

== See also ==
- Prose
- Verse (poetry)
