= Fears in Solitude =

Poem by Samuel Taylor Coleridge

Fears in Solitude, written in April 1798, is one of the conversation poems by Samuel Taylor Coleridge. The poem was composed while France threatened to invade Great Britain. Although Coleridge was opposed to the British government, the poem sides with the British people in a patriotic defense of their homeland. The poem also emphasizes a desire to protect one's family and to live a simple life in harmony with nature. The critical response to the poem was mixed, with some critics claiming that the work was "alarmist" and anti-British.

== Background ==
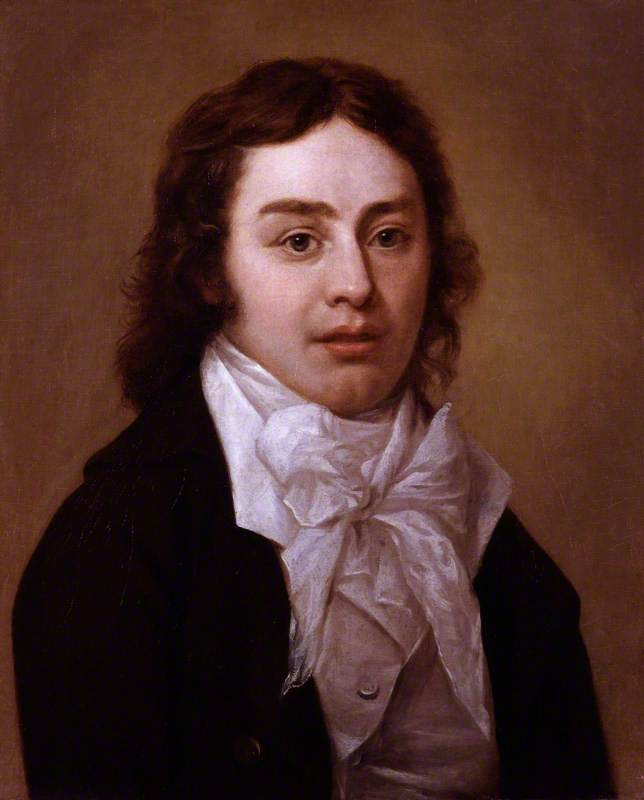
Samuel Taylor Coleridge

Coleridge, a radical and Jacobin, was an early supporter of the French Revolution and believed that it would bring much-needed political change to Europe and to Great Britain. However, the actions of the French government after the beginning of the revolution, especially their invasion of other nations, caused him to lose faith in their cause. Although Coleridge was opposed to the British government under prime minister William Pitt, he supported the British nation and the national defense when France threatened to invade Britain; the belief held by many Britons was that France would invade the Kingdom of Ireland, which was experiencing rebellion at the time.

These fears of an invasion manifested in April 1798, and Britons began to arm themselves. In April, Coleridge traveled to his childhood home at Ottery and then went to visit William and Dorothy Wordsworth; during this time Coleridge wrote "Fears in Solitude: Written in April 1798, During the Alarm of an Invasion". Fears in Solitude was first published in a small pamphlet collection that included Frost at Midnight and France: An Ode It was eventually printed seven times in various collections. One of the later printings of the poem, by Daniel Stuart, removed lines that directly attacked Pitt and the British government. This change reflected Coleridge's own changing political views from radical to more conservative beliefs.

== Poem ==
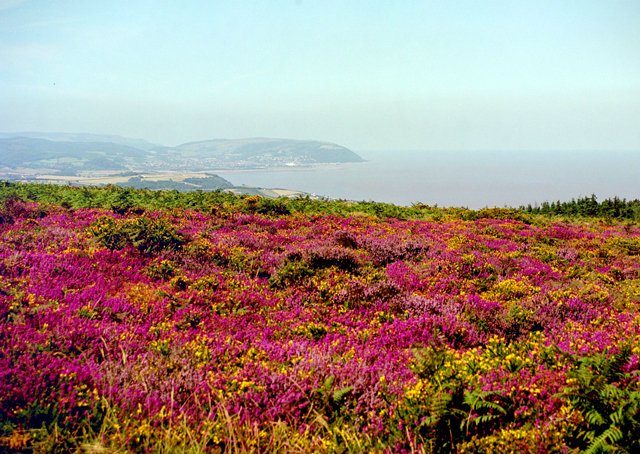
Quantock Hills

The poem begins with a Quantocks setting before moving onto politics:

A green and silent spot, amid the hills,
A small and silent dell! O'er stiller place
No singing sky-lark ever poised himself.

— lines 1–3

The poem continues by pointing out that the best life is a simple life and that there are men that live with nature:

And he, with many feelings, many thoughts,
Made up a meditative joy, and found
Religious meanings in the forms of Nature!

— lines 22–24

However, some of the British are like a plague that spreads their poor behavior to other nations:

[...] Like a cloud that travels on,
Steamed up from Cairo's swamps of pestilence,
Even so, my countrymen! have we gone forth
And borne to distant tribes slavery and pangs,
And, deadlier far, our vices, whose deep taint
With slow perdition murders the whole man,
His body and his soul! [...]

— lines 47–53

Although he attacks the corruption of British politicians, the narrator supports Britain:

O native Britain! O my Mother Isle!
How shouldst thou prove aught else but dear and holy
To me, who from thy lakes and mountain-hills,
Thy clouds, thy quiet dales, thy rocks and seas,
Have drunk in all my intellectual life,
All sweet sensations, all ennobling thoughts,
All adoration of the God in nature,
All lovely and all honourable things,
Whatever makes this mortal spirit feel
The joy and greatness of its future being?

— lines 182-191

The poem ends with the narrator praising his home at Nether Stowey and nature:

And now, belovéd Stowey! I behold
Thy church-tower, and, methinks, the four huge elms
Clustering, which mark the mansion of my friend;
And close behind them, hidden from my view,
Is my own lowly cottage, where my babe
And my babe's mother dwell in peace! With light
And quickened footsteps thitherward I tend,
Remembering thee, O green and silent dell!
And grateful, that by nature's quietness
And solitary musings, all my heart
Is softened, and made worthy to indulge
Love, and the thoughts that yearn for human kind.

— lines 221-232

== Themes ==
The politics within the poem emphasizes the problems within British politics and expresses Coleridge's views that the conservatives were warmongering and that there was corruption within the government. Although he feels this way, he still feels loyalty to the country and wants the British to be safe regardless of their problems. His other poem on the same topic, France: an Ode, describes how his view about the French Revolution changed over time, especially with France's invasion of Switzerland.

The images of the poem operate in a circular pattern, and the poem begins and ends with the Stowey dell where Coleridge lived. The peaceful home at the beginning is a parallel to the "Valley of Seclusion" in Coleridge's Reflections on Having Left a Place of Retirement, which is a quiet place that allows for a pleasant life. The ideas about nature also found in "The Eolian Harp" are brought up, following Coleridge's familiar Plotinian view. The poem also includes Coleridge's views on the unity of mankind and nature and the fear that an invasion would destroy this unity. To safeguard it, the narrator protects his family and the dell, along with the rest of Britain. There is also an emphasis on simple living, and the poem's conclusion, a return to the dell, represents a return of Coleridge to his own family.

The gothic elements of the poem connect it to many of his other works, including The Rime of the Ancient Mariner, "Ballad of the Dark Ladie", France: An Ode, Frost at Midnight, The Nightingale, "Three Graves", and "Wanderings of Cain".

== Critical response ==
A letter sent to Coleridge from his friends Robert and Edith Southey described the poem as "beautiful". There were four contemporary reviews of the original pamphlet collection including Fears in Solitude. The Critical Review believed that the poetry expressed alarmism. The British Critic thought he was anti-Britain. A review in the December Monthly Visitor emphasized the "beautiful lines" starting with line 129 until the end. Another review, in the January 1799 Monthly Mirror, claims, "The author's Fears are, perhaps, not highly honourable to his feelings as a Briton, nor very complimentary to the national character."

The Victorian poet Algernon Charles Swinburne, in the Preface to the 1875 edition of Christabel, argues,

Compare the nerveless and hysterical verses headed 'Fears in Solitude' (exquisite as is the overture, faultless in tone and colour, and worthy of a better sequel) with the majestic and masculine sonnet of Wordsworth [...] for, great as he is, I at least cannot hold Wordsworth, though so much the stronger and more admirable man, equal to Coleridge as a mere poet – speaks with a calm force of thought and resolution; Coleridge wails, appeals, deprecates, objurgates in a flaccid and querulous fashion without heart or spirit. This debility of mind and manner is set off in strong relief by the loveliness of landscape touches in the same poem.

In a September 1889 Fortnightly Review article called "Coleridge as a Poet", Edward Dowden writes, "Coleridge still declaims against the sins of England, and protests against the mad idolatry of national wrong-doing [...] yet utters himself before the close with all the filial loyalty of a true son of England, and he declares in a noble strain of eloquence how the foundations of his patriotism have been laid in the domestic affections".

During the 20th-century, Virginia Radley points out that "The most serious charge that can be brought against the poem is that it is not poetry as Coleridge generally conceived poetry to be. In fact, it is the one poem in this group that may mean but is not [...] Like 'France' too, the poem suffers from a lack of 'heart'." George Watson declares that the poem "shows how precarious Coleridge's new achievement was. It is a shameless return to the older, effusive manner, evidently written in a white heat of patriotic indignation against the degradation of English public opinion during the French wars, and it is only by stretching charity that it can be considered a conversation poem at all."

Following this, Geoffrey Yarlott states, "though disproportionate in qualities of thought and feeling (and one of the less successful therefore of the major 'annus mirabilis' poems), [Fears in Solitude] exemplifies the problems Coleridge had to wrestle with in assimilating didacticism to the requirements of poetic organization." Richard Holmes claims Fears in Solitude as "one of the most difficult of [Coleridge's] Conversation Poems". The ending, to Holmes, is "evoked with the magic, pastoral power of a Samuel Palmer picture".
