= The Nightingale: A Conversation Poem =

Poem written by Samuel Taylor Coleridge

The Nightingale: A Conversation Poem is a poem written by Samuel Taylor Coleridge in April 1798. Originally included in the first edition of Lyrical Ballads, which he published with William Wordsworth, the poem disputes the traditional idea that nightingales are connected to the idea of melancholy. Instead, the nightingale represents to Coleridge the experience of nature. Midway through the poem, the narrator stops discussing the nightingale in order to describe a mysterious female and a gothic scene. After the narrator is returned to his original train of thought by the nightingale's song, he recalls a moment when he took his crying son out to see the Moon, which immediately filled the child with joy. Critics have found the poem either decent with little complaint or as one of his better poems containing beautiful lines.

== Background ==
The Nightingale was written in April 1798 during the same time Coleridge wrote Fears in Solitude. During this time, Great Britain was at war with France, and the French were planning to invade Britain. News of the planned French invasion led to a wave of alarm spreading through Britain. During April, Coleridge traveled to his childhood home at Ottery and then went to visit William and Dorothy Wordsworth. It was during this time that Coleridge wrote "Fears in Solitude: Written in April 1798, During the Alarm of an Invasion".

The poem was included in a joint publication with William Wordsworth called Lyrical Ballads, which first appeared in 1798 (see 1798 in poetry). Originally, Coleridge intended to place Lewti, or the Circassian Love-chaunt in the collection. The Nightingale was published in seven other editions but was altered little.

== Poem ==
The poem begins with Milton's line in Il Penseroso about nightingales and then corrects it:

'Most musical, most melancholy' bird!
A melancholy bird? Oh! idle thought!
In nature there is nothing melancholy.
But some night-wandering man, whose heart was pierced
With the remembrance of a grievous wrong,
Or slow distemper, or neglected love,
(And so, poor wretch! filled all things with himself,
And made all gentle sounds tell back the tale
Of his own sorrow) he, and such as he,
First named these notes a melancholy strain.

— lines 13–22

The poem introduces Philomela, a character from Greek legend that suffered and whose name was later connected to the nightingale:

And youths and maidens most poetical,
Who lose the deepening twilights of the spring
In ball-rooms and hot theatres, they still
Full of meek sympathy must heave their sighs
O'er Philomela's pity-pleading strains.

My Friend, and thou, our Sister! we have learnt
A different lore: we may not thus profane
Nature's sweet voices, always full of love
And joyance! 'Tis the merry Nightingale
That crowds, and hurries, and precipitates
With fast thick warble his delicious notes,
As he were fearful that an April night
Would be too short for him to utter forth
His love-chant, and disburthen his full soul
Of all its music!

— lines 35-49

The poem introduces a female character that is Gothic and Romantic:

A most gentle Maid,
Who dwelleth in her hospitable home
Hard by the castle, and at latest eve
(Even like a Lady vowed and dedicate
To something more than Nature in the grove)
Glides through the pathways; she knows all their notes,
That gentle Maid! and oft a moment's space,
What time the moon was lost behind a cloud,
Hath heard a pause of silence; [...]

— lines 69-77

Eventually, the poem discusses Hartley, Coleridge's child. After the child started crying, the narrator takes him out into the night for the poem's conclusion:

I hurried with him to our orchard-plot,
And he beheld the moon, and, hushed at once,
Suspends his sobs, and laughs most silently,
While his fair eyes, that swam with undropped tears,
Did glitter in the yellow moon-beam! Well!—
It is a father's tale: But if that Heaven
Should give me life, his childhood shall grow up
Familiar with these songs, that with the night
He may associate joy.—Once more, farewell,
Sweet Nightingale! once more, my friends! farewell.

— lines 101–110

== Themes ==
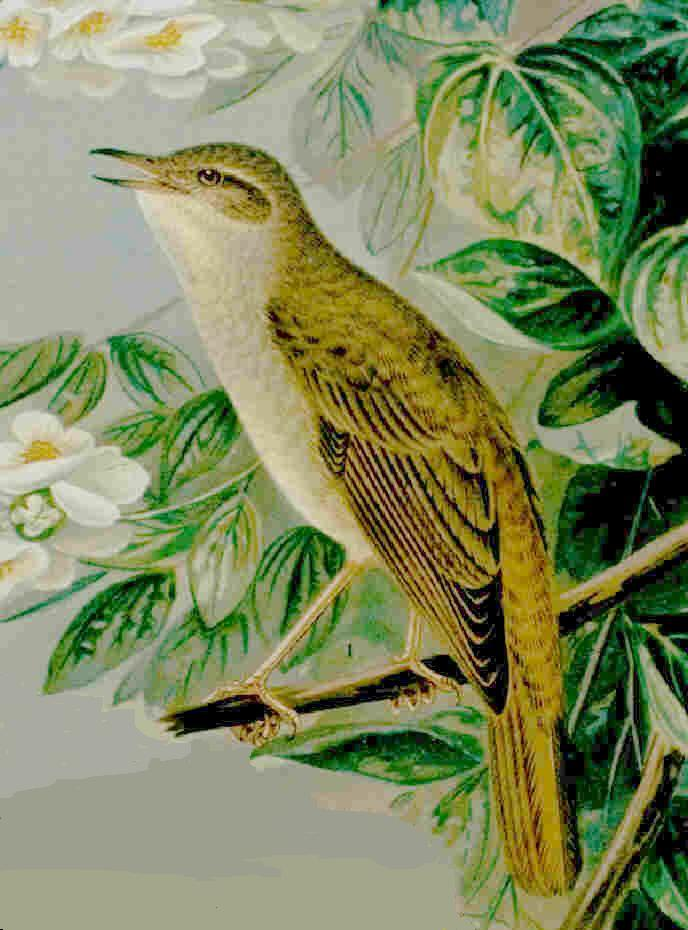
Drawing of a nightingale

The nightingale is used as an image to begin a topic that was directed towards William and Dorothy Wordsworth, Coleridge's friends. The nightingale was used as a sign of melancholy because of its relationship to the legend of Philomela, a rape victim. Although Coleridge corrects the idea of nightingale as melancholic, the poem relies on the tradition and gothic descriptions to guide the poem. Eventually, the nightingale is what brings the narrator back to his topic after diverging from it in a manner similar to John Keats's use in Ode to a Nightingale.

Unlike tradition, the nightingales represented an experience that Coleridge had with his friends, the Wordsworths. During the moment within the poem, a female is described that seems to be a combination of Dorothy and the title character of Christabel. There is no mention of Coleridge's wife, Sara, which separates The Nightingale from the other Conversation Poems. The poem does mention their child, Hartley, and an incident in which he saw the moon one night. The scene allows the narrator to return to the domestic and to nature.

After discussing Philomela, the poem lists a series of places that are a possible combination of real places with gothic descriptions. These places include Alfoxden, Enmore Castle, Nether Stowey Castle, and Stogursey Castle along with the grove possibly being connected to Holford Glen or Enmore. The gothic elements of the poem connect it to many of his other works, including Ancient Mariner, "Ballad of the Dark Ladie", Fears in Solitude, France: An Ode, Frost at Midnight, "Three Graves", and "Wanderings of Cain".

== Sources ==
Coleridge had many sources for the use of a nightingale. Directly, he quotes from John Milton's Il Penseroso, taking issue with Milton's portrayal of the bird as "most musical, most melancholy" while explaining in a footnote that he would never want to take issue with Milton. Although the image was used throughout literature, Richard Barnfield's Ode and James Thomason's Winter provide two other examples within English literature. Unlike his sources, Coleridge disagrees that the nightingale represents melancholy. This idea created a new tradition that was continued by Wordsworth, and there are connections to many later works which include images found within George Dyer's Poetic, John Keats's Ode to a Nightingale, and Leigh Hunt's Imagination or Fancy. There is also a connection to Coleridge's earlier poem "To the Nightingale", a poem that followed the traditional cliche about nightingales and melancholy.

== Critical response ==
In statements regarding Lyrical Ballads, Coleridge's friend Robert Southey described The Nightingale as "tolerable".

In the 20th-century, George Watson writes, "'The Nightingale' has a scattered air, as if it had been written with an altogether exceptional indifference to design and scale." Following this, Geoffrey Yarlott claims, "In The Nightingale, where the metaphysic is played down [...] it is greatly to the improvement of the poem, and there the mature conversational tone duplicates almost perfectly the shifting flow of natural speech and feeling."

Richard Holmes, when referring to Lyrical Ballads, states: "Yet this final, unsatisfactory mixture did allow a significant third element to enter the collection at a later stage: the intimate, blank verse nature meditations which produced two of the finest individual poems — Coleridge's 'The Nightingale' and Wordsworth's 'Tintern Abbey'." Rosemary Ashton argues that, "Bantering though this is, and, however, beautiful the final lines about Hartley are, 'The Nightingale' is as a whole a less successful poem than the other conversation poems. It has rather a blank at the centre, just where the others pivot on a significant controlling idea."
