= France: An Ode =

1798 poem written by Samuel Coleridge

"France an Ode" was written by Samuel Coleridge in April 1798. The poem describes his development from supporting the French Revolution to his feelings of betrayal when they invaded Switzerland. Like other poems by Coleridge, it connects his political views with his religious thoughts. The Gothic elements of the poem connect the poem's style to many of his early poetic works.

== Background ==
Coleridge was an early supporter of the French Revolution and an opponent of British Prime Minister William Pitt the Younger. However, the French invasion of Switzerland caused him to lose faith in the revolutionaries' cause during April 1798. Although Coleridge opposed Pitt, he supported the British war effort when France was planning to invade Britain in the late 1790s by writing a poem originally titled The Recantation: An Ode, which was later renamed France: An Ode. The poem was published in the 16 April 1798 Morning Post (see 1798 in poetry). Alongside the poem was a note from Daniel Stuart, the paper's editor, which stated that, like Coleridge, the paper also switched its position on France: "The following excellent Ode will be in unison with the feelings of every friend to Liberty and foe to Oppression; of all who, admiring the French Revolution, detest and deplore the conduct of France towards Switzerland."

Soon after, the poem was published in a small work containing his other poems Frost at Midnight and Fears in Solitude under the title France: An Ode to sound more neutral. The poems were published in order with Fears in Solitude first and Frost at Midnight last to position the public poem, France: An Ode, in between two conversation poems. It was eventually reprinted by Stuart in October 1802 along with an edited version of Fears in Solitude. Of his poems, Coleridge did not like France: An Ode for what it revealed about him politically. Robert Southey, Coleridge's friend, mentioned in a letter in May 1799: "Coleridge's 'Ode upon France' is printed in the Spirit of the Public Journals under the title of 'the Recantation.' How will he like this, and how will they like it who do not allow it to be a recantation?"

In a 1799 review in the New London Review, an anonymous reviewer claimed that Coleridge plagiarised lines from Samson Agonistes when he referenced John Milton's poem in lines 53 and 54 of the poem. Later, Thomas DeQuincey made this same argument in an 1834 review for Taits Edinburgh Magazine. William Wordsworth noted that the allusion to Samson Agonistes was intentional, but it is possible that "insupportably advancing" was changed to "irresistibly advancing" in a later edition to hide the allusion.

== Poem ==
The poem begins by describing the narrator's feelings about liberty:

Yea, every thing that is and will be free!
Bear witness for me, wheresoe'er ye be,
With what deep worship I have still adored
The spirit of divinest Liberty.

— lines 18–21

Then the poem describes France at the beginning of the revolution. The image, a combination of giant and child, is commonly quoted in political works:

When France in wrath her giant-limbs upreared,
And with that oath, which smote air, earth, and sea,
Stamped her strong foot and said she would be free,
Bear witness for me, how I hoped and feared!

— lines 22–25

The poem then criticises Britain for joining the monarchs of Continental Europe in opposing France:

Like fiends embattled by a wizard's wand,
The Monarchs marched in evil day,
And Britain joined the dire array;
Though dear her shores and circling ocean,
Though many friendships, many youthful loves
Had swoln the patriot emotion
And flung a magic light o'er all her hills and groves;

— lines 29–35

When France entered into the Reign of Terror, the narrator describes it as necessary. However, the supporters of France were still terrified by the violence while they hoped that liberty would come:

When France her front deep-scarr'd and gory
Concealed with clustering wreaths of glory;
When, insupportably advancing,
Her arm made mockery of the warrior's ramp;
While timid looks of fury glancing,
Domestic treason, crushed beneath her fatal stamp,
Writhed like a wounded dragon in his gore;

— lines 51–57

Then the narrator describes the betrayal he suffered as France invaded Switzerland:

I hear thy groans upon her blood-stained streams!
Heroes, that for your peaceful country perished,
And ye that, fleeing, spot your mountain-snows
With bleeding wounds; forgive me, that I cherished
One thought that ever blessed your cruel foes!
To scatter rage, and traitorous guilt,
Where Peace her jealous home had built;
A patriot-race to disinherit
Of all that made their stormy wilds so dear;
And with inexpiable spirit
To taint the bloodless freedom of the mountaineer—
O France, that mockest Heaven, adulterous, blind,
And patriot only in pernicious toils!

— lines 67–79

== Themes ==
A main focus of France: An Ode is Coleridge's feelings over France's invasion of Switzerland. The invasion marked when France became a threat to other nations. When positioned between Fears in Solitude and Frost at Midnight, shows the development of Coleridge's feelings from youth. It describes how he viewed each stage of the revolution, from hope to horror, and how it caused him to turn from his contemporary politics while still defending liberty.

The poem, like other poems by Coleridge, connects his political views with his religious ideas. Many of the images that he uses to describe the French Revolution are connected to the Book of Revelation. Religious Musings shows an early version of the idea that was later developed in France: An Ode. Coleridge's interpretation involves a Golden Age that is in a distant future, and that he can only spend his time thinking about what the future would hold. The Gothic elements of the poem connect it to many of his other works, including Ancient Mariner, "Ballad of the Dark Ladie", Fears in Solitude, Frost at Midnight, The Nightingale, "Three Graves", and "Wanderings of Cain".
