= Daniel Lovell =

Imprisoned English journalist (d. 1818)

Daniel Lovell (died 27 December 1818) was an English journalist, involved in high-profile court cases concerned with press freedom.

== Life ==
Lovell was for many years proprietor and editor of The Statesman, a London newspaper set up in 1806 by John Hunt. He was an outspoken critic through the paper of the Tory government of the time, and he was subjected to much persecution.

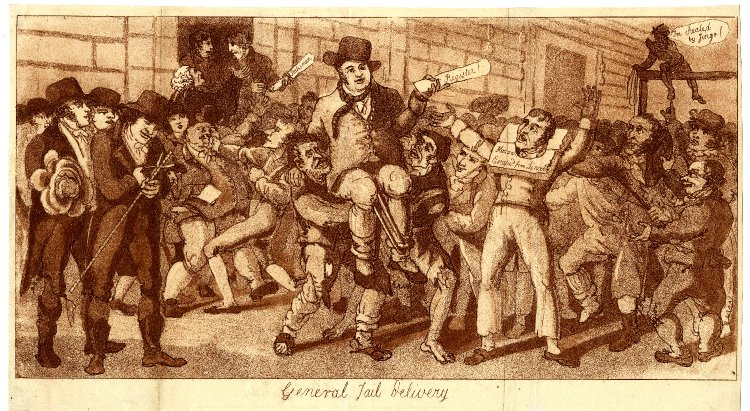
General Jail Delivery, satirical engraving of the time of Lovell's first imprisonment; the publication The Statesman is shown held (back to the left) by a man talking to a barrister; towards the front William Cobbett holds The Register, and Peter Finnerty is shown in a piece of pillory.

In 1811, Lovell was sentenced to twelve months' imprisonment for copying the reporting of Manchester papers on the conduct of the military at Sir Francis Burdett's arrest; in contrast the original publishers of the libel were only asked to express regret at their inadvertence. In August 1812, he was again tried and found guilty of a libel on the commissioners of the transport service; and although he pleaded that it was published without his knowledge or sanction while he was in prison, he was sentenced to pay a fine, to be imprisoned in Newgate Prison for eighteen months, and to find securities for three years, with two sureties. Being unable to pay the fine or find sureties, he remained in jail.

On 23 November 1814, Samuel Whitbread and Anthony Browne, Whig Members of Parliament, took up Lovell's case. Whitebread presented a petition from Lovell asking for a remission or reduction of his fine; and after some time the government remitted the fine and reduced the amount of security. Lovell was still unable to meet the requirement for a security, and on 17 March 1815 Whitbread again presented a petition from him, stating his utter inability to do as he had been asked, and calling the merciful consideration of the House of Commons, he having been confined nearly four years in Newgate.

Lovell was ultimately released, broken in health and financially ruined. In 1817, he was again heavily fined for writing abusively about the evening paper The Courier and its editor Daniel Stuart, which closely supported the government. He further accused Stuart of dishonestly taking money belonging to the Society of the Friends of the People.

Lovell died in Salisbury Court, Fleet Street, on 27 December 1818. Just before his death, he had sold the Statesman to Sampson Perry, previously editor of The Argus.
