= Reflections on Having Left a Place of Retirement =

Poem by Samuel Taylor Coleridge (1796)

Reflections on Having Left a Place of Retirement is a poem written by English poet Samuel Taylor Coleridge in 1796. Like his earlier poem The Eolian Harp, it discusses Coleridge's understanding of nature and his married life, which was suffering from problems that developed after the previous poem. Overall, the poem focuses on humanity's relationship with nature in its various aspects, ranging from experiencing an Edenic state to having to abandon a unity with nature in order to fulfill a moral obligation to humanity. The discussion of man's obligation to each other leads into a discussion on the difference between the life of a philosopher and the life of a poet. By the end of the poem, the narrator follows the philosophical path in a manner similar to what Coleridge sought to do. The response to the poem from critics was mostly positive, with many of them emphasizing the religious aspects of the work in their analysis.

== Background ==
After marrying Sara Fricker in autumn 1795, Coleridge left their home at Clevedon and began to travel throughout England in order to meet with various philosophers and political theorists. In part, he was trying to meet with people so he could raise subscriptions for his various works. During this time, he would write home constantly to his pregnant wife and was concerned about her state of health. His feelings of guilt, along with a fever that he treated with laudanum, affected him greatly and caused him to express these feelings in a letter to Josiah Wade on 10 February 1796: "My past life seems to me like a dream, a feverish dream! all one gloomy huddle of strange actions, and dim-discovered motives! Friendships lost by indolence, and happiness murdered by mismanaged sensibilities."

After the letter, Coleridge returned to his wife who was now living with her family at Redcliffe Hill, Bristol. Just as he had written The Eolian Harp to commemorate coming to his home at Clevedon, Coleridge composed Reflections on Having Left a Place of Retirement on leaving it. The poem was not included in Coleridge's 1796 collection of poems as it was probably still incomplete, but it was published in the October 1796 Monthly Magazine under the title Reflections on Entering into Active Life. A poem Which Affects Not to be Poetry. Reflections was included in Coleridge's 28 October 1797 collection of poems and the collections that followed. Of his early poems, Coleridge believed that Reflections was his best.

== Poem ==
The poem begins with an idealisation of a "Valley of Seclusion":

[...] In the open air
Our Myrtles blossom'd; and across the porch
Thick Jasmins twined: the little landscape round
Was green and woody, and refresh'd the eye.
It was a spot which you might aptly call
The Valley of Seclusion! [...]

— lines 4–9

The poem continues with a goodbye to the valley and asks if his life of pleasure was appropriate:

I was constrain'd to quit you. Was it right,
While my unnumber'd brethren toil'd and bled,
That I should dream away the entrusted hours
On rose-leaf beds, pampering the coward heart
With feelings all too delicate for use?

— lines 44–48

The narrator describes the reasons why he is leaving Clevedon along with the allowance of remembering his former life there after his work is done:

I therefore go, and join head, heart, and hand,
Active and firm, to fight the bloodless fight
Of Science, Freedom, and the Truth in Christ.

Yet oft when after honourable toil
Rests the tir'd mind, and waking loves to dream,
My spirit shall revisit thee, dear Cot!

— lines 60–65

== Themes ==
The themes of Reflections are connected to Coleridge's The Eolian Harp as the scene for both is the same. The land of Clevedon is praised and seen full of life, and it serves as contrast to escaping from the real world into fantasy and pondering about the abstract. Both poems also describe Coleridge's relationship with his wife and feelings of sexual desire. The imagination aspects of the poem represent an unwillingness to accept nature on its own and rejects the conclusion of The Eolian Harp. Although the land of Clevedon can bring one closer to God, one cannot just simply exist in such an area but must seek out truth.

Feeling the need to seek out truth creates a separation between the mind of a poet and the mind of a philosopher. The poem reconciles the two by allowing the pursuer of truth to reflect on his time of simply enjoying nature and God's presence. However, the philosopher aspect is dominant and the individual must go out and try to help humanity. Nature can be soothing, but the narrator must reject the Edenic quality of nature because such a state is not yet appropriate. The Edenic imagery figures into many of Coleridge's poems and is reinforced with the image of myrtle trees and takes on many forms within his poetry. In Reflections, to dwell in an Edenic state is a paradise in which the narrator leaves voluntarily because he cannot ignore the problems of the world like a coward. Instead, the individual is compelled to join with humanity and even the lowest form of benefiting humanity is superior to doing nothing at all.

The image of nature and other themes reappears in Fears in Solitude (1798). The later poem recreates the "Valley of Seclusion" image in the form of a dell. Even the image of a passerby looking in on the cottage found in Reflection is repeated. Similarly, the compulsion to enter into the world and help humanity is included, but it is altered from being motivated by guilt to a warning message against a possible invasion from outside forces. As such, Fears in Solitude does not seek to leave the location to help humanity, but to stay as a protector over his family.

In Coleridge's own life, he tried to follow the path of the philosopher, but the 10 July 1834 entry in Table Talk admits that he was unable to do so: "so I own I wish life and strength had been spared to me to complete my Philosophy. For, as God hears me, the originating, continuing, and sustaining wish and design in my heart were to exalt the glory of his name; and, which is the same thing in other words, to promote the improvement of humanity. But visum aliter Deo, and his will be done."

In terms of Coleridge's marriage, Reflections differs from The Eolian Harp by saying that there were problems within the marriage, especially with it distracting Coleridge from nature and the world outside of the home that he shared with his wife. The poem expresses feelings of solitude and confinement, and there is a difference between the worlds inside and outside of the cottage in a similar manner to the focus found within Coleridge's Kubla Khan. This is especially true with a focus from the private to the public spheres. Within the outside world, the poem's narrator is separate from humanity, but his focus is ever on humanity and contains both a religious and political component. The image of "One Life" within the poem compels him to abandon the sensual pleasures of the cottage and to pursue a path of helping humanity.

== Sources ==
Besides the natural relationship of the poem with the land of Clevedon, there are literary connections within the poem. The poem begins with a line from Horace, although in many versions it is misquoted. The line, "sermoni propiori", is from Horace's Satires 1.4.42 and is intended to describe the work as a whole as connecting to prose. The second stanza, where the narrator describes Dial Hill as the "stony Mount", is connected to William Crowe's Lewesdon Hill (1788). It is possible that Reflections could have been an imitation of Crowe's poetry. In terms of Edenic imagery, including types of plant life, Coleridge's are connected to John Milton's Paradise Lost Book Four.

== Critical response ==
The Critical Review saw favor with "To the River Otter" and Reflections in their review of the 1797 collection of Coleridge's poem. The July review claims that the poem "evince a feeling heart. The comparison between the weeping eyes of a humane friend and the unmoved face of another equally benevolent, and the contrast between the latter and those who merely affect sympathy, are well drawn."

During the 20th century, Virginia Radley declares that Reflections "although not so striking in imagery as is The Eolian Harp, still has much to recommend it in this respect [...] The impression left with the reader that the cottage and its surroundings are inestimably lovely, quiet, and peaceful is a paramount one, while the dead lines [...] do not move the reader at all, except to make him wonder if the move from Clevedon for the cause of humanity was a necessary one." Richard Haven argues that the poem's image of the moral path is weak because "the returned traveller can only dismiss his ascent to another mode of being as a pleasant but useless memory".

Anthony Harding believes "it is important to recognize that it steps outside the idyllic but circumscribed scene of The Eolian Harp, and admits the impossibility, in a fallen world, of human self-sufficiency." Oswald Doughty states that the "most important additions" to Coleridge's 1797 edition of poems included Reflections. Richard Holmes points out that both Reflections and The Eolian Harp "mark a new stage in Coleridge's exploration of the sacred relations between man and nature, which gradually become more serious and impassioned as they carry increasingly theological implications behind his Romanticism."
