= Hartley Coleridge =

English poet and biographer (1796–1849)

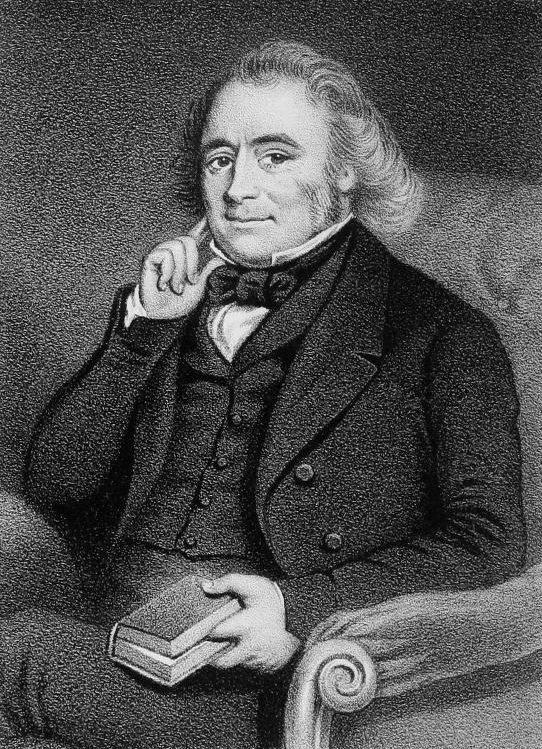
- Coleridge in an 1850 engraving
- Born: 19 September 1796; Clevedon, Somerset, England
- Died: 6 January 1849 (aged 52); Rydal, Westmorland, England
- Parent(s): Samuel Taylor Coleridge; Sara Fricker
- Relatives: Sara Coleridge (sister); Derwent Coleridge (brother)
- Writing career
- Genres: poetry, essays, biographies

Hartley Coleridge, possibly David Hartley Coleridge (19 September 1796 – 6 January 1849), was an English poet, biographer, essayist, and teacher. He was the eldest son of the poet Samuel Taylor Coleridge. His sister Sara Coleridge was a poet and translator, and his brother Derwent Coleridge was a scholar and author. Hartley was named after the philosopher David Hartley.

== Biography ==
=== Early life ===
Hartley was born in Clevedon, a small village near Bristol. His father mentions Hartley in several poems, including the well-known Frost at Midnight, where he addresses him as his "babe so beautiful", and in his The Nightingale: A Conversation Poem, both of which are concerned with young Hartley's future.

In the autumn of 1800 Samuel Taylor Coleridge moved his wife and young son Hartley to the Lake District. They took a home in the vale of Derwentwater, on the bank of the Greta River, about a mile away from Greta Hall, Keswick, the future home of the poet Robert Southey, which was then being built. Hartley spent his early years in the care of Robert Southey at Greta Hall, which possessed the best library in the neighbourhood.

Hartley's brother Derwent wrote the following about Hartley's time at Greta Hall:

"The unlimited indulgence with which he was treated at Greta Hall, tended, without doubt, to strengthen the many and strong peculiarities of his nature, and may perhaps have contributed to that waywardness and want of control, from which in later-life he suffered so deeply."

=== Education ===
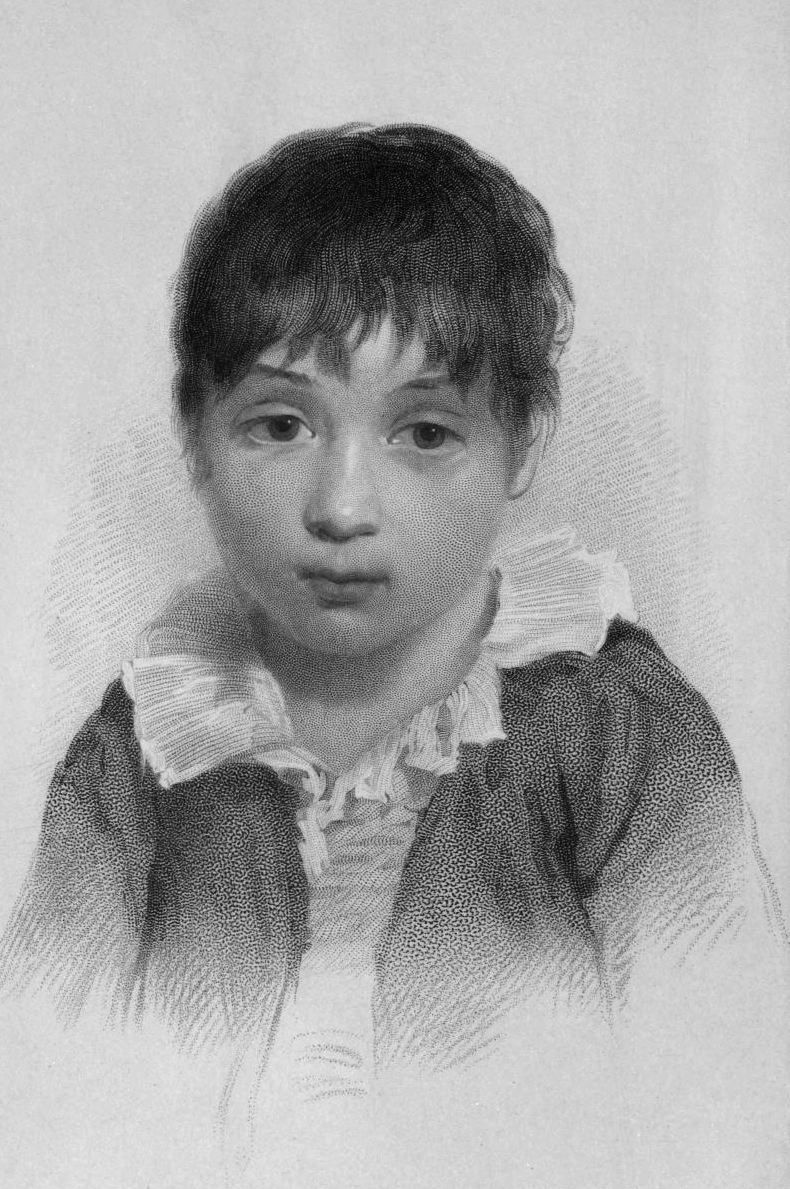
Hartley at the age of 10

Hartley received his early education from his father. In 1807 he was taken by his father and William Wordsworth to Coleorton in North West Leicestershire, and then to London. Here he visited the London theatres, and the Tower of London with Walter Scott. He was also introduced to the study of chemistry by Humphry Davy.

Hartley spent the next eight years in constant companionship with his younger brother Derwent, at home and at school. Beginning in the summer of 1808 they attended school as day-scholars at Ambleside, under the tutelage of the Rev. John Dawes. During their time at the school they resided in Clappersgate. Their fellow students included the sons of their father's friend, the poet Charles Lloyd. Hartley and Derwent lived in the home of an elderly woman, and enjoyed total freedom in their after-school hours. Hartley, who had no aptitude for sports, spent much of his time reading and taking walks by himself, or telling stories. He had one close friend at the time, a boy named Robert Jameson, not a fellow student, to whom he afterwards addressed a series of sonnets.

Somewhere along the way, Hartley conceived the idea of an underground stream of water that would eventually erupt onto the surface, creating a mighty river that would soon attract merchants and land developers, leading to the formation of a new island-continent. He called this imaginary paracosm Ejuxria, and laid out its geography and history with great care, explaining everything to Derwent as he went along. Derwent believed that Hartley kept up Ejuxria into adulthood.

In his time at the school, Hartley was in constant contact with William Wordsworth and his family. He pursued his studies of English in Wordsworth's library at Allan Bank in Grasmere. His privilege of studying in the Wordsworth library was continued after the Wordsworth family moved to Rydal Mount.

He went to Oxford in 1815, as a scholar of Merton College. From 1816 to 1820 he was in receipt of an exhibition funded from the bequest of James Wood administered by the Worshipful Company of Bowyers of the City of London. Derwent Coleridge made this comment about his brother's time at Oxford:

Though far from a destructive in politics, he was always keenly alive to what he supposed to be the evils and abuses of the existing state of things both in Church and State, while he remained constant in his allegiance to what he believed to be the essentials of both... On all subjects he spoke his mind, often, through whim or impatience, more than his mind, freely, without regard to consequences.

On a vacation in 1818 Hartley met the poet Chauncy Hare Townshend, who said the following of him:

I cannot easily convey to you the impression of interest which he made on my mind at that time. There was something so wonderfully original in his method of expressing himself, that on me, then a young man, and only cognisant externally of the prose of life, his sayings, all stamped with the impress of poetry, produced an effect analogous to that which the mountains of Cumberland, and the scenery of the North, were working on my southern-born eye and imagination.

He had inherited much of his father's character, and his lifestyle was such that, although he was successful in gaining a fellowship at Oriel College, at the close of the probationary year (1820) he was judged to have forfeited it, mainly on the grounds of intemperance. The authorities would not reverse their decision; but they awarded him a gift of £300. This incident deeply saddened his father, who did everything he could to try to get the decision reversed, but without success. Hartley suffered from a dependency on alcohol for the rest of his life.

=== Career ===
He then spent two years in London, where he wrote short poems for the London Magazine. It was around this time that he composed the fragment Prometheus, which his father regarded with much interest. His next step was to become a partner in a school at Ambleside, at the suggestion of his family and friends, a venture which he himself carried out with reluctance, but this scheme failed. After a struggle of four or five years, Hartley abandoned teaching, and moved to Grasmere.

From 1826 to 1831, he wrote occasionally in Blackwood's Magazine, to which he was introduced by his friend, John Wilson. His contributions to this periodical form part of the general collection of his Essays.

In 1830 a Leeds publisher, F. E. Bingley, made a contract with him to write biographies of Yorkshire and Lancashire worthies. These were afterwards republished under the title of Biographia Borealis (1833) and Worthies of Yorkshire and Lancashire (1836). Bingley also printed a volume of his poems in 1833, and Coleridge lived in his house until the contract came to an end through the bankruptcy of the publisher.

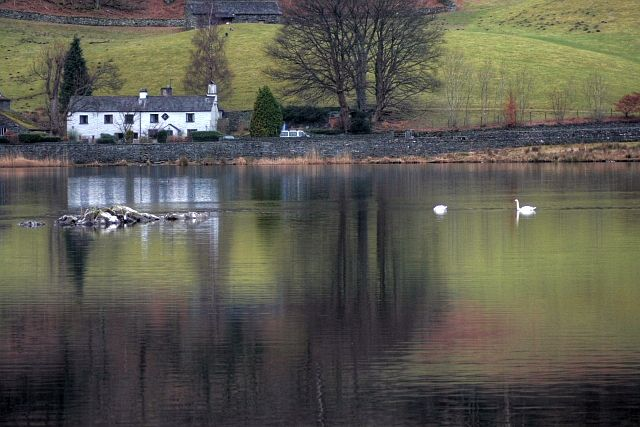
Nab Cottage, Hartley's home in Rydal, Cumbria

From this time, except for two short periods in 1837 and 1838 when he acted as master at Sedbergh School, he lived quietly at Grasmere and (1840–1849) Rydal, spending his time in study and wanderings about the countryside. His figure was as familiar as Wordsworth's, and he made many friends among the locals. In 1834 he lost his father. Hartley made the following comment about his father's death in a letter to his mother:

... though I cannot say that I was much surprised, yet so little had I prepared my mind for the loss, that it fell upon me as the fulfilment of an unbelieved prophecy: and even yet, though I know it, I hardly believe it. I do not feel fatherless. I often find my mind disputing with itself—What would my father think of this? and when the recollection awakes, that I have no father, it appears more like a possible evil than an actual bereavement.

In 1839 he brought out his edition of Philip Massinger and John Ford, with biographies of both dramatists. The closing decade of Coleridge's life was wasted in what he himself called "the woeful impotence of weak resolve". On the death of his mother in 1845, he was placed, by means of an annuity on his life, on a footing of complete independence, but he lived for only three more years.

Hartley Coleridge's literary reputation chiefly rests on his works of criticism, on his Prometheus, an unfinished lyric drama, and on his sonnets (a form which suited his particular skills). Essays and Marginalia, and Poems, with a memoir by his brother Derwent, appeared in 1851.

== Modern criticism ==
- Hartley Coleridge, his Life and Work, E. L. Griggs, R. West, 1977.
- Hartley Coleridge: A Reassessment of His Life and Work, Andrew Keanie, Palgrave Macmillan, 2008.
