= The Eolian Harp =

Poem by Samuel Taylor Coleridge (1795–96)

The Eolian Harp is a poem written by Samuel Taylor Coleridge in 1795 and published in his 1796 poetry collection. It is one of the early conversation poems and discusses Coleridge's anticipation of a marriage with Sara Fricker along with the pleasure of conjugal love. However, The Eolian Harp is not a love poem and instead focuses on man's relationship with nature. The central images of the poem is an Aeolian harp, an item that represents both order and wildness in nature. Along with the harp is a series of oppositional ideas that are reconciled with each other. The Eolian Harp also contains a discussion on "One Life", Coleridge's idea that humanity and nature are united along with his desire to try to find the divine within nature. The poem was well received for both its discussion of nature and its aesthetic qualities.

== Background ==
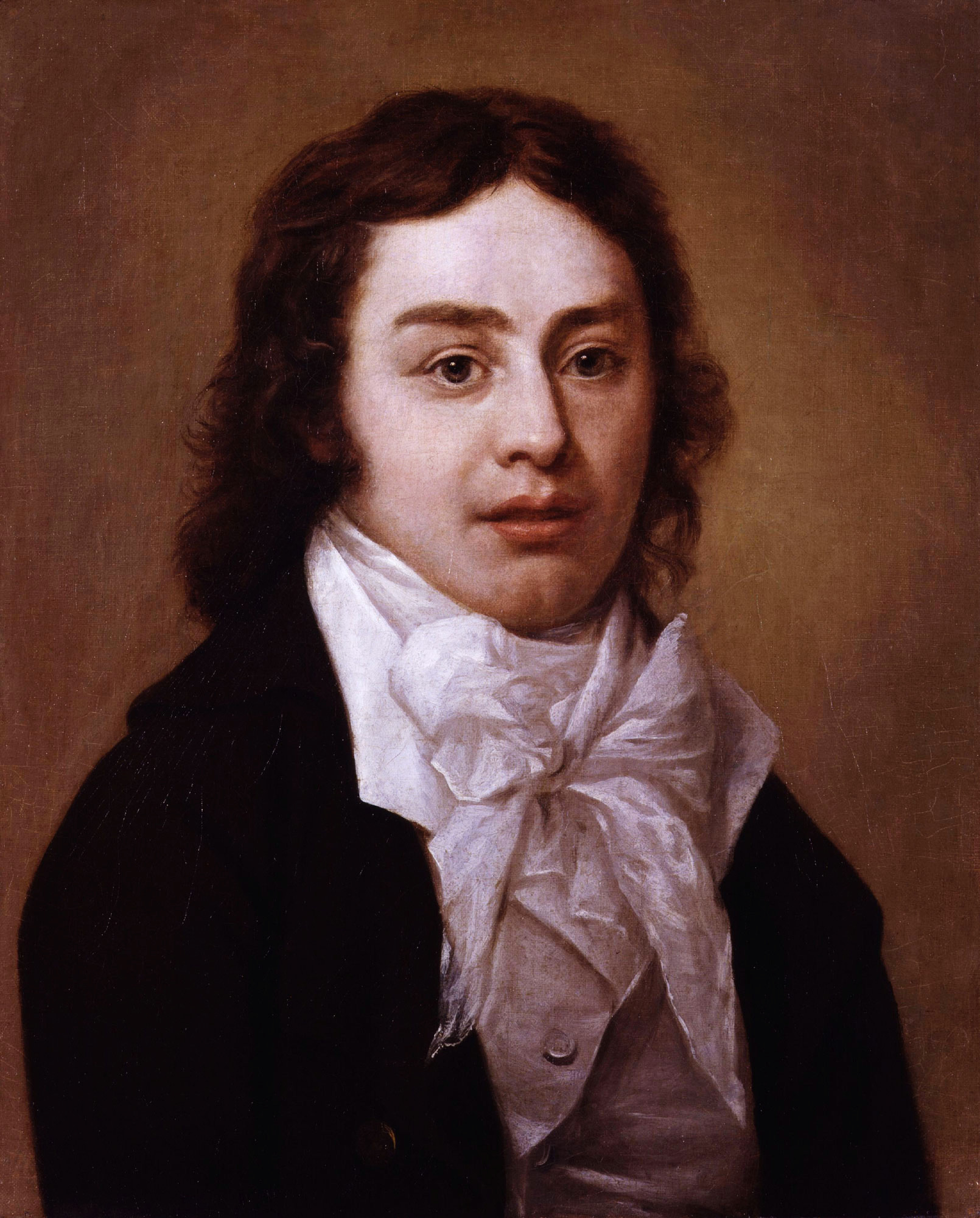
Coleridge in 1795

Coleridge began writing The Eolian Harp on 20 August 1795 during his engagement to Sara Fricker. Like his previous poem Lines Written at Shurton Bars, the poem discusses both his engagement and his future marriage. Coleridge was inspired to write the poem after a visit to a house in Clevedon that would serve as his and Fricker's home after their marriage. As Coleridge worked on the poem, he and Fricker were married and they moved to the Clevedon home. During this time, Coleridge held an idealised view of his life with Fricker, and these thoughts work their way into the poem. The poem was published in the 1796 edition of Coleridge's poems and in all subsequent collections. Of his poems for the 1796 collection, Coleridge felt that The Eolian Harp was his favourite.

After the poem's original creation, it was expanded from its original use of an Aeolian harp as its theme over the months that followed. However, Coleridge did not stop working on it when it was first published. Instead, the poem was expanded and rewritten throughout Coleridge's life until 1817. Of the final version, lines 21–25 were previously removed between the 1797 and 1815 editions of Coleridge's poems. Likewise, lines 26–33 were altered through the multiple editions. Regardless of the amount of editing, Coleridge believed that the poem served as a model for other poems, especially those in the series called Conversation poems. Of The Eolian Harp as a model for poetry, Coleridge wrote, "Let me be excused, if it should seem to others too mere a trifle to justify my noticing it—but I have some claim to the thanks of no small number of the readers of poetry in having first introduced this species of short blank verse poems—of which Southey, Lamb, Wordsworth, and others have since produced so many exquisite specimens."

== Poem ==
The poem begins by addressing Fricker and discussing the house at Clevedon:

My pensive Sara! thy soft cheek reclined
Thus on mine arm, most soothing sweet it is
To sit beside our Cot, our Cot o'ergrown
With white-flower'd Jasmin, and the broad-leav'd Myrtle,
(Meet emblems they of Innocence and Love!)
And watch the clouds, that late were rich with light,
Slow saddening round, and mark the star of eve
Serenely brilliant (such should Wisdom be)
Shine opposite! How exquisite the scents
Snatch'd from yon bean-field! and the world so hushed!
The stilly murmur of the distant Sea
Tells us of silence.

— lines 1–12

As the poem continues, objects are described as if they were women being pursued:

And that simplest Lute,
Placed length-ways in the clasping casement, hark!
How by the desultory breeze caress'd,
Like some coy maid half yielding to her lover,
It pours such sweet upbraiding, as must needs
Tempt to repeat the wrong!

— lines 12–17

The poem then introduces Coleridge's idea of "One Life", where man and nature are connected:

O! the one Life within us and abroad,
Which meets all motion and becomes its soul,
A light in sound, a sound-like power in light,
Rhythm in all thought, and joyance every where—
Methinks, it should have been impossible
Not to love all things in a world so fill'd;
Where the breeze warbles, and the mute still air
Is Music slumbering on her instrument.

— lines 26–33

Near the end of the poem, the narrator discusses pantheism before reproving himself for it soon after:

And what if all of animated nature
Be but organic Harps diversely fram'd,
That tremble into thought, as o'er them sweeps
Plastic and vast, one intellectual breeze,
At once the Soul of each, and God of all?

— lines 44–48

== Themes ==
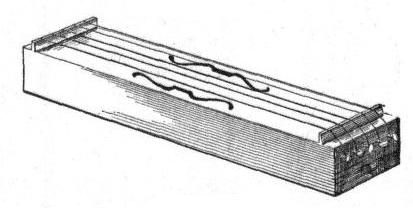
A 19th-century Aeolian harp

The poem discusses love, sex, and marriage, but it is not done in the form of a love poem. Instead, it compares love with an Aeolian harp, which is a symbol of poetry. In terms of the relationship described, the desire expressed during an engagement with Fricker is described as innocent. Also, the anticipation of the conjugal union is free of any potential disappointment or any guilt that would result in sex outside of marriage. As such, there is a thematic connection with the poem "Lines Written at Shurton Bars" written on the same subject around the same time. As the poem was completed after Coleridge's marriage, the themes became similar to the ideas expressed in his Reflections on Having Left a Place of Retirement. Both poems discuss the Clevedon area and the impact of the countryside upon the viewer. Also, they provide information on how Coleridge and Fricker felt during their relationship and marriage. However, Reflections suggests that there are some problems within the relationship.

The poem portrays a series of oppositional ideas and how they can be reconciled with each other. The image of a beanfield is contrasted against the image of a lute while they are compared to the image of a coy woman being caressed and then resisting the caresses. This image is compounded with the coy woman being caressed compared to the innocence of Fricker. Nature is also seen in its oppositions, with a wildness within nature being contrasted with order within nature, especially in regards to the effects of an Aeolian harp and Coleridge's pantheistic feelings about nature. In terms of religion, The Eolian Harp describes the mind's desire to seek after the divine. Coleridge's approach is similar to Ralph Cudworth's in The True Intellectual System of the Universe. In the same theme, he wrote to John Thelwall in a letter dated 14 October 1797,

I can at times feel strongly the beauties, you describe, in themselves & for themselves — but more frequently all things appear little — all knowledge, that can be acquired, child's play — the universe itself—what but an immense heap of little things? — I can contemplate nothing but parts, & parts are all little — ! — My mind feels as if it ached to behold & know something great — something one & indivisible — and it is only in the faith of this that rocks or waterfalls, mountains or caverns give me the sense of sublimity or majesty! — But in this faith all things counterfeit infinity!

The nature images connect back to desire and marriage, especially with an image like the myrtle tree that performs this function in many of Coleridge's poems. However, Coleridge's pantheistic feelings on nature are said to receive reproof from Fricker, and Coleridge returns to a more traditional view of God that deals more with faith than finding the divine within nature.

The poem discusses his understanding of nature within the concept of "One Life", an idea that is presented as a resulting from Coleridge's reflection on his experiences at Clevedon. The conversation poems as a whole are connected to the ideas within The Eolian Harp that deal with understanding the universe. The "One Life" lines added to the 1817 edition interconnect the senses and also connects sensation and experience of the divine with the music of the Aeolian harp. Although the earlier editions do not include the same understanding of perception, there traces of the idea expressed in the earlier editions. Coleridge derived his early understanding from the works of Jakob Böhme, of which he wrote in a 4 July 1817 letter to Ludwig Tieck: "Before my visit to Germany in September, 1798, I had adopted (probably from Behmen's Aurora, which I had conjured over at School) the idea, that Sound was = Light under the praepotence of Gravitation, and Color = Gravitation under the praepotence of Light: and I have never seen reason to change my faith in this respect." Along with this view of sensation, Coleridge adopted Böhme's idea of connecting to God through the will instead of the intellect, and that pantheism should be denied. Coleridge also relies in part on Böhme's understanding of polarity of opposites in his own views of Polar Logic and man's attempt to return to Paradise.

== Sources ==
The image of the Aeolian harp was a popular image in turn of the 19th-century literature and collections were built around poems dedicated to the harps. Coleridge's possible poetic influences include James Thomson's Ode on Aeolus's Harp, The Castle of Indolence, and Spring.

Arguments have been made for various possible philosophical influences, including: Joseph Priestley, George Berkeley and David Hartley; Ralph Cudworth; Friedrich Heinrich Jacobi and Moses Mendelssohn; and Jakob Böhme.

In Coleridge's copy of Kant's Critik der reinen Vernunft, he wrote: "The mind does not resemble an Eolian Harp, nor even a barrel-organ turned by a stream of water, conceive as many tunes mechanized in it as you like—but rather, as far as Objects are concerned, a violin, or other instrument of few strings yet vast compass, played on by a musician of Genius."

== Critical response ==
During the mid 20th-century, Virginia Radley states, "the 'Eolian Harp' itself can be read with pleasure without a redaction of the poem for meaning. It is a poem which comes full circle from Eden to Eden" and that "Perhaps a poem should indeed not mean but be, and, to this point, the 'Eolian Harp' is a true poem. The images and the personalities are striking enough to deserve approval from a purely belletristic standpoint. But the poem has meaning also." Following this, M. H. Abrams declared that the idea of the "One Life" within The Eolian Harp, "best epitomize the Romantic constellation of joy, love, and the shared life".

Later, Oswald Doughty argues that the poem is "one of his happiest poems" and "For once Coleridge and his environment blended into a single, harmonious idyllic mood, and the 'blank verse' poem is permeated with a rare fusion of reflective thought and sensitivity to peaceful, nature beauty". Richard Holmes simply describes The Eolian Harp as Coleridge's "beautiful Conversation Poem". Rosemary Ashton believes that the poem "shows an exact eye for natural detail combined with a sharp ear for rhythms both conversational and yet heightened into poetic form". She later declared that "Only a few sonnets and 'The Eolian Harp' [...] display Coleridge's gift for simplicity rising, as if effortlessly, to sublimity."
