= The Old Familiar Faces =

1798 poem by Charles Lamb

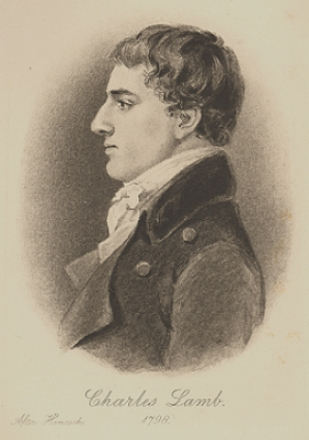
Charles Lamb in 1798, the year he wrote and published "The Old Familiar Faces". Drawn and engraved by Robert Hancock.

"The Old Familiar Faces" (1798) is a lyric poem by the English man of letters Charles Lamb. Written in the aftermath of his mother's death and of rifts with old friends, it is a lament for the relationships he had lost. It has long been Lamb's most popular poem, and was included in both The Oxford Book of English Verse and Palgrave's Golden Treasury.

== Text ==
Where are they gone, the old familiar faces?

I had a mother, but she died, and left me,
Died prematurely in a day of horrors—
All, all are gone, the old familiar faces.

I have had playmates, I have had companions,
In my days of childhood, in my joyful school-days,
All, all are gone, the old familiar faces.

I have been laughing, I have been carousing,
Drinking late, sitting late, with my bosom cronies,
All, all are gone, the old familiar faces.

I loved a love once, fairest among women;
Closed are her doors on me, I must not see her—
All, all are gone, the old familiar faces.

I have a friend, a kinder friend has no man;
Like an ingrate, I left my friend abruptly;
Left him, to muse on the old familiar faces.

Ghost-like, I paced round the haunts of my childhood.
Earth seemed a desart I was bound to traverse,
Seeking to find the old familiar faces.

Friend of my bosom, thou more than a brother,
Why wert not thou born in my father's dwelling?
So might we talk of the old familiar faces—

How some they have died, and some they have left me,
And some are taken from me; all are departed;
All, all are gone, the old familiar faces.

== Interpretation ==
Lamb's biographer E. V. Lucas identified the friend in the fifth stanza as the poet Charles Lloyd, and that in the seventh as Samuel Taylor Coleridge, Lamb's old schoolfellow. The phrase some are taken from me he interpreted as a reference to Lamb's sister Mary, who had recently been confined in a lunatic asylum during one of her periodic fits of madness, in the first of which she had killed her mother. The "fairest among women" of the fourth stanza was, he thought, a Hertfordshire girl called Ann Simmons whom Lamb loved in his earliest youth and whom he elsewhere wrote about under the names "Anna" and "Alice W—". A later biographer, Winifred F. Courtney, largely concurred with Lucas's identifications, but suggested that the plural form of the phrase some are taken from me indicated that Lamb was referring to Ann Simmons as well as Mary Lamb.

== Composition ==
"The Old Familiar Faces" was written in January 1798 in circumstances Lamb himself described in a note to his friend Marmaduke Thompson.

I spent an evening about a week ago with Lloyd. White, and a miscellaneous company was there. Lloyd had been playing on a pianoforte till my feelings were wrought too high not to require Vent. I left em suddenly & rushed into y^{e} Temple, where I was born, you know – & in y^{e} state of mind that followed [I composed these] stanzas. They pretend to little like Metre, but they will pourtray y^{e} Disorder I was in.

The disorder Lamb mentions may have been caused by Mary's recent mental health crisis and confinement, or perhaps by their father's decline in physical health. The loose metre he apologises for can be interpreted as a reminiscence of the dactylic metre he and Coleridge had studied in Latin verse at school, though he may also have been influenced by the unstressed final syllables which characterise the Jacobean playwright Philip Massinger's works.

== Publication ==
Lamb published "The Old Familiar Faces", along with six others of his own poems and more by his friend Charles Lloyd, in their Blank Verse (1798). He reprinted it in The Works of Charles Lamb (1818), but without the opening four lines referring to Mary's killing of their mother, doubtless having come to the conclusion that those events were no business of the reading public. Later anthologies have often printed the poem in this curtailed form.

== Criticism ==
Lamb is not now principally known as a poet, "The Old Familiar Faces" and "Hester" being the only two of his poems that are still read and valued. Popular as it is, there is no critical consensus as to whether "The Old Familiar Faces" is an artistic success. Lamb himself confessed that he had no skill in the handling of metre, but A. C. Ward argued that this is no handicap in a poem that depends instead on rhythm. Robert Graves complained of the "rambling incompetence of the argument"; he suggested improvements, but claimed that even they could make the poem no more than "a macabre account of what would now be called 'a regressive infantile fixation'." Others have called it Lamb's most successful poem, a work which shows him "at his bleakest and most powerful", "transcend[ing] the particulars of his situation to express his feelings about it in universal terms". The poet Edmund Blunden was struck by the poem's dreamlike, almost Alice in Wonderland treatment of the universal, everyday experience of loss. "The very cadence of the household word is heard as a peculiar intimation. Objects a few doors off are seen as from beyond the grave." E. V. Lucas thought it "unsurpassed in the language" for its "tragic tenderness and melancholy".

== Settings ==
There have been at least two settings by notable composers:

- George Alexander Macfarren, "The Old Familiar Faces", for voice and piano (c. 1865).
- Jan Mul, "The Old Familiar Faces", for bass and chamber orchestra (1969).
