= Frost at Midnight =

Poem by Samuel Taylor Coleridge

Frost at Midnight is a poem by Samuel Taylor Coleridge, written in February 1798. Part of the conversation poems, the poem discusses Coleridge's childhood experience in a negative manner and emphasizes the need to be raised in the countryside. The poem expresses hope that Coleridge's son, Hartley, would be able to experience a childhood that his father could not and become a true "child of nature". The view of nature within the poem has a strong Christian element in that Coleridge believed that nature represents a physical presence of God's word and that the poem is steeped in Coleridge's understanding of Neoplatonism. Frost at Midnight has been well received by critics, and is seen as the best of the conversation poems.

== Background ==
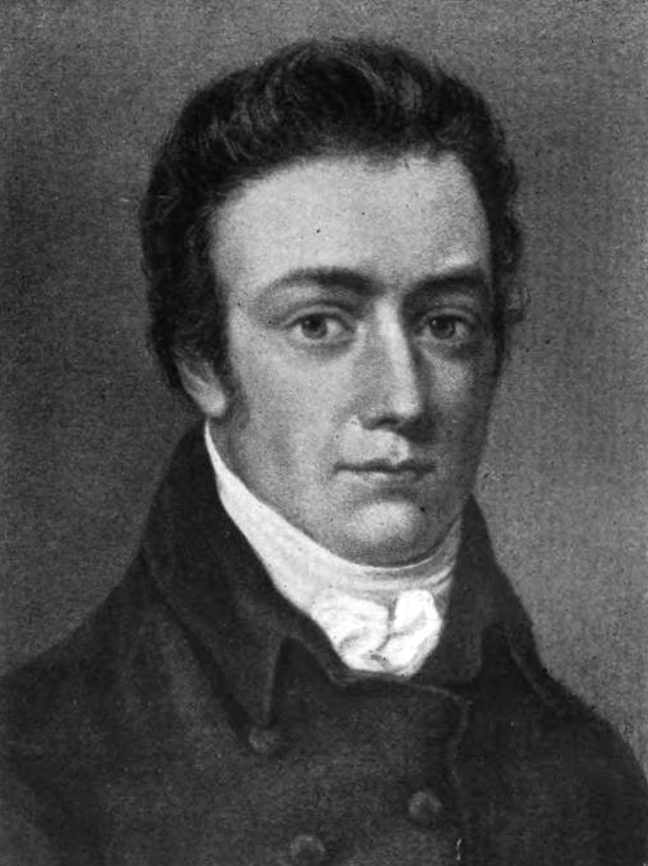
Samuel Taylor Coleridge

Frost at Midnight was written in February 1798 when he described to Thomas Poole aspects of his childhood at Christ's Hospital school that are similar to the content of the poem. The rest comes from Coleridge's experience with his friend, William Wordsworth. It was Wordsworth who provided Coleridge with a detailed description of the Lake District which served as a basis for Coleridge's description of the place. The relationship between Coleridge and Wordsworth was a close friendship, and Coleridge helped rewrite many of Wordsworth's poems during this time. Frost at Midnight was later connected to many of Wordsworth's poems. The poem was published in a small work containing his other poems France: An Ode and Fears in Solitude.

The poem was intended to be added to Coleridge's third edition of his collected poems, but a dispute with Charles Lloyd, a fellow writer, and Joseph Cottle, their mutual publisher, altered his plans. The poem was later collected in Sibylline Leaves, published in 1817 (see 1817 in poetry). It was rewritten many times, and seven different versions were printed. Of these revisions, the 1798 edition differs from the others in the final six lines, which were removed in later versions. Of this removal, Coleridge explains in George Beaumont's copy of the poems: "The last six lines I omit because they destroy the rondo, and return upon itself of the Poem. Poems of this kind & length ought to lie coiled with its tail round its head."

== Themes ==
The narrator comes to an understanding of nature after being isolated and left to his thoughts. Nature becomes a comforter, but the narrator remembers his loneliness during childhood. During his final year at Christ's Hospital, Coleridge completed a poem he titled "On Quitting School for College" for a school exercise. In the poem, he describes his time at the school as a pleasant experience. However, Frost at Midnight redefines the experience as one that deprived him of the countryside.

There is another quality to Coleridge's retelling of his childhood experience: he adds supernatural descriptions to the common scenes of his youth. In particular, the church bells are able to make a promise of a better life. The Gothic elements of the poem connect it to many of his other works, including Ancient Mariner, "Ballad of the Dark Ladie", Fears in Solitude, France: An Ode, The Nightingale, "Three Graves", and "Wanderings of Cain".

Within the poem, the narrator expresses his hope that his child, Hartley Coleridge, will experience a life connected to nature as represented by features typical of the Lake District, which Coleridge in common with other Lake Poets revered. This is similar to what Coleridge's friend William Wordsworth does with the narrator of Tintern Abbey, a poem composed later that year. Many of the feelings of the narrator for his child are connected to Coleridge's sonnet "To a Friend Who Asked, How I Felt When the Nurse Presented My Infant to Me". The ideas about nature in This Lime-Tree Bower are transformed into the basis for an education, and Hartley is to learn through nature in an innocent way. Coleridge's nature has a Christian presence and nature is a physical presence of God's word. Coleridge's understanding of God is Neoplatonic and emphasizes a need to experience the divine knowledge.

Like many of the conversation poems, Frost at Midnight touches on Coleridge's idea of "One Life", which connects mankind to nature and to God. Touching on themes that come up in The Eolian Harp, Religious Musings, and other poems, the poem produces the image of a life that the narrator's child will experience in the countryside. The boy would become a "child of nature" and raised free of the constraints found in philosophical systems produced by those like William Godwin.

Another key theme within Frost at Midnight that is important to note is that of the flickering film of ash. The flicker of ash reminds the reader, or Coleridge to be more specific, of a time long since past. The flicker of the ash film reminds the reader of the delicate nature of memory and how the past is like a shadow only barely hanging on. This film of ash adds a supernatural tone to the piece, it is similar to the major thematic trends of Gothic fiction in which the supernatural and the unknown are the focus. The flickering ash also hints at the language of wartime and anxiety. The first and last stanzas of Frost at Midnight evokes the language of anxiety. The first stanza points to the fact of the unknown ministry of frost found in line 1 of the poem. This unknown ministry of frost "disturbs and vexes meditation with its strange and extreme silentness." The language of anxiety is prevalent in the first stanza which brings in the final stanza as a point of contrast. The last stanza evokes the language of ease and acceptance. Coleridge, seemingly writing to his young son, is writing about how nature will teach all that we need to know. Contrasting with the anxious tone of the first stanza, the last stanza in Frost at Midnight helps to wrap up the anxious tone of the poem and bring it back to the comfortable tone of calmness. We again see the line "secret ministry of frost" in the third last line of the last stanza. In the first stanza, the "secret ministry of frost" was used as a point of anxiety and tension. This line was used as a point of contention and made the reader feel as if this was something to fear. In the last stanza, this repetition serves to illustrate the truly unknown powers of nature and how we should seek comfort in letting nature teach us all that we need to know.

== Sources ==
Coleridge draws upon many poems, including ideas from William Cowper's Task. There is also a possible connection to John Thelwall's poem To the Infant Hampden.—Written during a Sleepless Night. Derby. Oct. 1797 along with his other poems On Leaving the Bottoms of Glocestershire and Maria: A Fragment. Other sources are William Collins Ode on the Popular Superstitions of the Highlands of Scotland. In terms of philosophy, Coleridge brings together ideas in George Berkeley's An Essay Towards a New Theory of Vision and David Hartley's Observations on Man.

== Critical response ==
Christopher Moody, in the Monthly Review of May 1799, declared that the original six lines of the ending were "flat", a view that Coleridge probably agreed with.

During the 20th century, Virginia Radley argues, "Although no conversation poem can rightly be said to stand equally with the poems of high imagination ... certainly "Frost at Midnight" and "This Lime-tree Bower ..." both have within them that quality of heart so essential to these latter poems. Because of this quality, and because of the striking effectiveness of their imagery, these poems can be said to be the true harbingers of Coleridge's greatest poems".

Richard Holmes declares that the poem "is one of the most intricately structured of all the Conversation Poems, performing a characteristic 'outward and return' movement through time and space ... This curve of memory and prophesy gives the poem a rich emotional resonance – sadness, poignancy, hope, joy – held in exquisite tension". Rosemary Ashton believes that the poem is "one of [Coleridge's] most delightful conversation poems". Adam Sisman believes that Frost at Midnight is "perhaps the most beautiful of Coleridge's 'conversation poems'".
