= Daniel Stuart =

Scottish journalist

Daniel Stuart (16 November, 1766–1846) was a Scottish journalist, and associate of Samuel Taylor Coleridge.

== Early life ==
He was born in Edinburgh on 16 November 1766, into the traditionally Jacobite Stuarts of Loch Rannoch. In 1778 he was sent to London to join his elder brothers, Charles and Peter, who were in the printing business. The eldest brother Charles Stuart took play-writing. Peter Stuart (fl. 1788–1805) started the Tory paper The Oracle before 1788, and in 1788 set up The Star, which was the first London evening paper to appear regularly. Daniel and Peter lived with their sister Catherine, who in February 1789 secretly married James Mackintosh. She died in April 1796.

Daniel Stuart assisted Mackintosh as secretary to the Society of the Friends of the People, for parliamentary reform. In 1794 he published a pamphlet, Peace and Reform, against War and Corruption, in answer to Arthur Young's The Example of France a Warning to Great Britain.

== Morning Post ==
In 1788, Peter and Daniel Stuart undertook the printing of the Morning Post, a moderate Whig newspaper, which was then owned by Richard Tattersall, and was at a low ebb. In 1795 Tattersall disposed of it to the Stuarts; Daniel Stuart took on the management, and within two years Stuart raised the circulation of the paper from 350 a day to a thousand. Gradually he converted it into an organ of the moderate Tories. By buying in The Gazetteer and The Telegraph, good management and hiring talented writers, he made the Post a rival to the Morning Chronicle, then the top London daily.

Mackintosh, who wrote regularly for it in its earlier days, introduced Samuel Taylor Coleridge to Stuart in 1797. Coleridge became a frequent contributor, and when, in the autumn of 1798, he went to Germany, Robert Southey supplied contributions in his place. On Coleridge's return it was arranged that he should give his whole time to the Morning Post and receive Stuart's largest salary. Stuart took rooms for him in King Street, Covent Garden, and Coleridge told William Wordsworth that he dedicated his nights and days to Stuart. Wordsworth, unpaid, contributed some political sonnets. Coleridge introduced Charles Lamb to Stuart; but Stuart was never impressed, though Lamb wrote of himself as having been connected with the Post from 1800 to 1803. According to Lamb,

In those days every Morning Paper, as an essential retainer to its establishment, kept an author, who was bound to furnish daily a quantum of witty paragraphs. Sixpence a joke - and it was thought pretty high too - was Dan Stuart’s settled remuneration in these cases. The chat of the day, scandal, but, above all, dress, furnished the material. The length of no paragraph was to exceed seven lines. Shorter they might be, but they must be poignant.

In August 1803 Stuart disposed of the Morning Post for £25,000, when the daily circulation was at the then unprecedented rate of 4,500.

== The Courier ==
Stuart had meanwhile supervised the foreign new in The Oracle, the Tory paper still owned by his brother Peter, and in 1796 he had purchased an evening paper, The Courier. He increased the daily sale of the Courier from 1,500 to 7,000. The price was 7d., and second and third editions were published daily for the first time. It circulated widely among the clergy.

From 1809 to 1811 Coleridge was an intermittent contributor to Courier. An article which Stuart wrote, with Coleridge's assistance, in 1811 on the conduct of the princes in the regency question provoked a speech from the Duke of Sussex in the House of Lords. Mackintosh contributed to the Courier from 1808 to 1814, and Wordsworth wrote articles on the Spanish and Portuguese navies. Southey also sent extracts from his pamphlet on the Convention of Cintra before its publication.

For his support of Henry Addington's government Stuart declined any reward. From 1811 he left the management of the Courier almost entirely in the hands of his partner, Peter Street, under whom it became a ministerial organ. In 1817 Stuart obtained a verdict against Daniel Lovell, editor of The Statesman, who had accused him of dishonestly taking money belonging to the Society of the Friends of the People.

In 1822 Stuart sold his interest in the Courier.

Coleridge wrote to Stuart in 1816, praising his journalism for the Courier:

It is far, very far, from hyperbole to affirm, that you did more against the French scheme of Continental domination, than the Duke of Wellington has done; or rather Wellington could neither have been supplied by the Ministers, nor the Ministers supported by the Nation, but for the tone first given, and then constantly kept up, by the plain, unministerial, anti-opposition, anti-jacobin, anti-gallican, anti-Napoleonic spirit of your writings, aided by the colloquial good style, and evident good sense, in which as acting on an immense mass of knowledge of existing men and existing circumstances, you are superior to any man I ever met with in my life time.

== Later life ==
Stuart gave Coleridge money at later periods. In a correspondence with Henry Coleridge, he contested statements made in print by James Gilmann and Coleridge himself, to the effect that Coleridge and his friends had been exploited by his papers and were inadequately rewarded.

Stuart purchased Wykeham Park, Oxfordshire. He died on 25 August 1846 at his house in Upper Harley Street in London. He had married in 1813.
