= Conversation poems =

Poems composed by Samuel Taylor Coleridge

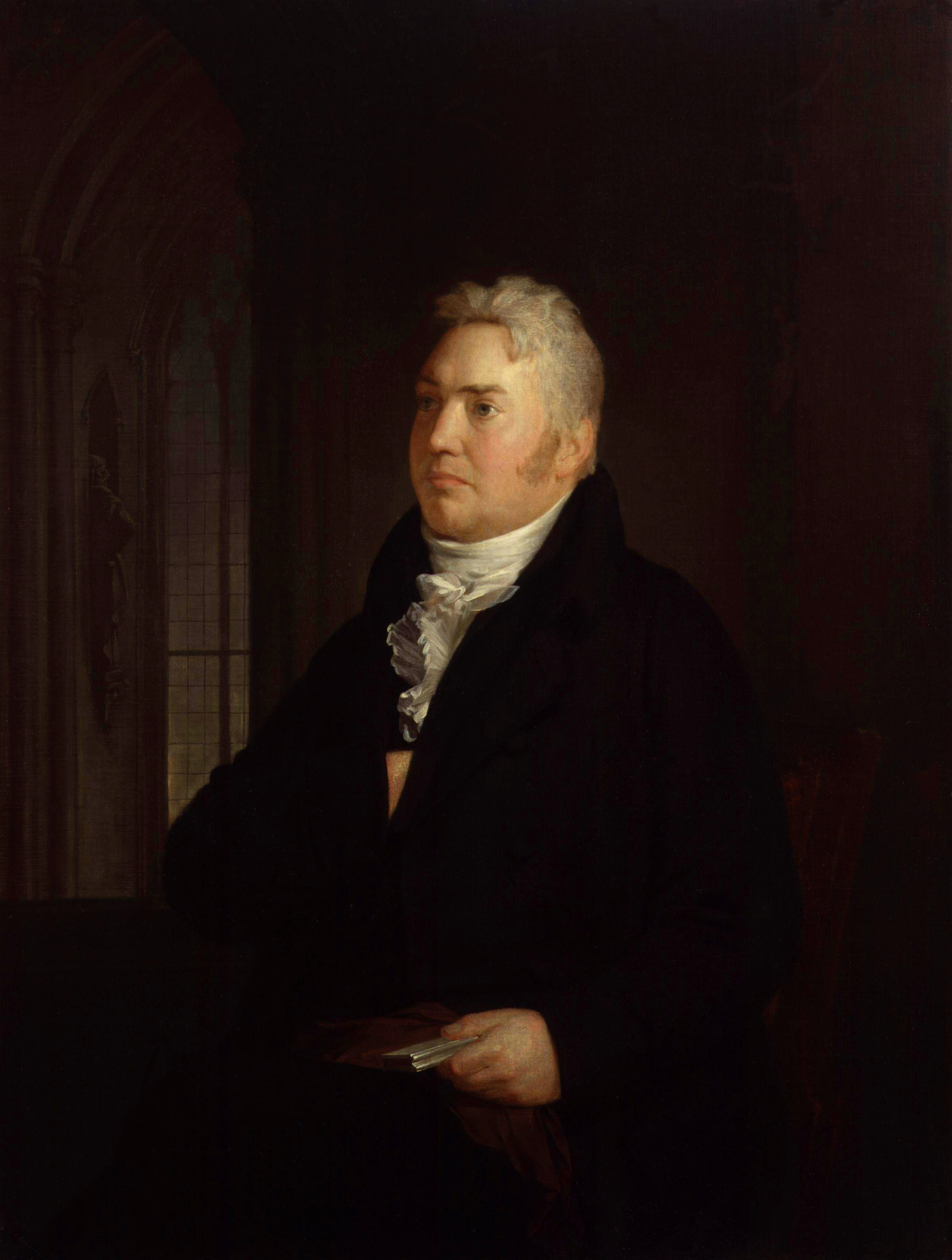
Samuel Taylor Coleridge portrayed by Washington Allston in 1814

The conversation poems are a group of at least eight poems composed by Samuel Taylor Coleridge (1772–1834) between 1795 and 1807. Each details a particular life experience which led to the poet's examination of nature and the role of poetry. They describe virtuous conduct and man's obligation to God, nature and society, and ask if there is a place for simple appreciation of nature without having to actively dedicate one's life to altruism.

The conversation poems were grouped in the 20th century by literary critics who found similarity in focus, style and content. The series title was devised to describe verse where Coleridge incorporates conversational language while examining higher ideas of nature and morality. The works are held together by common themes, in particular they share meditations on nature and man's place in the universe. In each, Coleridge explores his idea of "One Life", a belief that people are spiritually connected through a universal relationship with God that joins all natural beings.

Critics have disagreed on which poem in the group is strongest. Frost at Midnight is usually held in high esteem, while Fears in Solitude is generally less well regarded.

== Grouping ==
20th-century literary critics often categorise eight of Coleridge's poems (The Eolian Harp, Reflections on having left a Place of Retirement, This Lime-Tree Bower my Prison, Frost at Midnight, Fears in Solitude, The Nightingale: A Conversation Poem, Dejection: An Ode, To William Wordsworth) as a group, usually as his "conversation poems". The term was coined in 1928 by George McLean Harper, who used the subtitle of The Nightingale: A Conversation Poem (1798) to describe all eight. Harper considered these poems as a form of blank verse that is "...more fluent and easy than Milton's, or any that had been written since Milton". In 2006, Robert Koelzer wrote about another aspect of this apparent "easiness", noting that "The Eolian Harp and The Nightingale maintain a middle register of speech, employing an idiomatic language that is capable of being construed as un-symbolic and un-musical: language that lets itself be taken as 'merely talk' rather than rapturous 'song'."

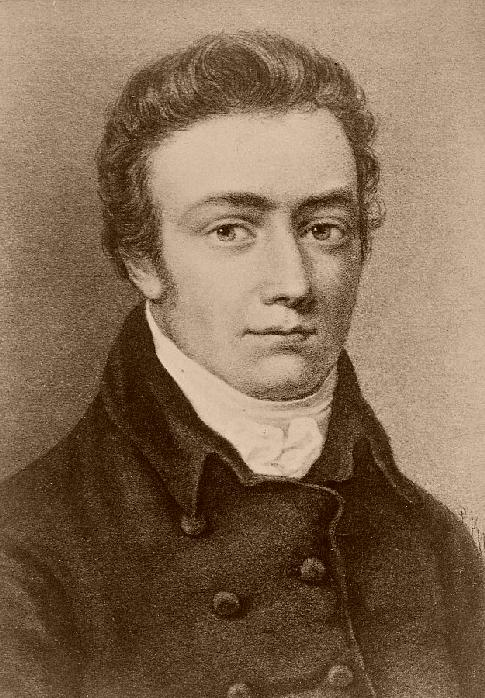
Portrait of Coleridge

M. H. Abrams wrote a broad description of the works in 1965. He observed that in each, the speaker "begins with a description of the landscape; an aspect or change of aspect in the landscape evokes a varied by integral process of memory, thought, anticipation, and feeling which remains closely intervolved with the outer scene. In the course of this meditation the lyric speaker achieves an insight, faces up to a tragic loss, comes to a moral decision, or resolves an emotional problem. Often the poem rounds itself to end where it began, at the outer scene, but with an altered mood and deepened understanding which is the result of the intervening meditation." In fact, Abrams was describing both the conversation poems and later works influenced by them. Abrams' essay has been described as a "touchstone of literary criticism". As Paul Magnuson wrote in 2002, "Abrams credited Coleridge with originating what Abrams called the 'greater Romantic lyric', a genre that began with Coleridge's 'Conversation' poems, and included William Wordsworth's Tintern Abbey, Percy Bysshe Shelley's Stanzas Written in Dejection and John Keats's Ode to a Nightingale, and was a major influence on more modern lyrics by Matthew Arnold, Walt Whitman, Wallace Stevens, and W. H. Auden."

In 1966, George Watson devoted a chapter to the poems in his literary analysis Coleridge the Poet. Although stressing that the form was the only type of poetry Coleridge created, he admitted that "the name is both convenient and misleading. A conversation is an exchange; and these poems, a dozen or fewer, stretching from 'The Eolian Harp' [...] to 'To William Wordsworth] [...] and perhaps further, are plainly monologues. Those who met Coleridge in his later life, it is true, were inclined to find his conversation arrestingly one-sided, but this will hardly serve as an explanation of what is happening here."

== Poems ==
=== The Eolian Harp ===
My pensive Sara! thy soft cheek reclined
Thus on mine arm, most soothing sweet it is
To sit beside our Cot, our Cot o'ergrown
With white-flower'd Jasmin, and the broad-leav'd Myrtle,
(Meet emblems they of Innocence and Love!)
And watch the clouds, that late were rich with light,
Slow saddening round, and mark the star of eve
Serenely brilliant (such should Wisdom be)
Shine opposite! How exquisite the scents
Snatch'd from yon bean-field! and the world so hushed!
The stilly murmur of the distant Sea
Tells us of silence.
And that simplest Lute,
Plac'd length-ways in the clasping casement, hark!
How by the desultory breeze caress'd,
Like some coy maid half yielding to her lover,
It pours such sweet upbraiding, as must needs
Tempt to repeat the wrong! [...]
—"Eolian Harp" (lines 1–17)

Coleridge began work on The Eolian Harp in August 1795 during his engagement to Sara Fricker. It details their future union and was inspired by his visit to the house in Clevedon that would serve as their home after their wedding. The poem is infused by the fact that Coleridge took an idealised view of his life with Fricker.

The Eolian Harp was published in the 1796 edition of Coleridge's poems and in all subsequent collections. Coleridge did not stop working on the poem after it was published. He expanded and reworked up until 1817. It deals with themes of love, sex and marriage, but is not formed in the usual manner of a love poem. In contrast to the second poem in the series, Reflections, which hints at problems with the relationship, The Eolian Harp focuses on innocence and the poet's anticipation of his conjugal union.

The poem creates a series of oppositional themes with aspects of nature representing each: seduction and innocence, order and chaos. These oppositions establish tension before the poem asks as to how they can be reconciled. These images and their being reconciled are described as analogous to the effects of an Aeolian harp and Coleridge's pantheistic feelings towards nature. In terms of religion, The Eolian Harp describes the mind's desire to seek after the divine. His approach is similar to Ralph Cudworth's in The True Intellectual System of the Universe. However, Coleridge's pantheistic feelings on nature are said to receive reproof from Fricker, and Coleridge returns to a more traditional view of God that deals more with faith than finding the divine within nature.

=== Reflections on Having Left a Place of Retirement ===
Ah! quiet Dell! dear Cot, and Mount sublime!
I was constrain'd to quit you. Was it right,
While my unnumber'd brethren toil'd and bled,
That I should dream away the entrusted hours
On rose-leaf beds, pampering the coward heart
With feelings all too delicate for use?
Sweet is the tear that from some Howard's eye
Drops on the cheek of one he lifts from earth:
And he that works me good with unmov'd face,
Does it but half: he chills me while he aids,
My benefactor, not my brother man!
Yet even this, this cold beneficence
Praise, praise it, O my Soul! oft as thou scann'st
The sluggard Pity's vision-weaving tribe!
Who sigh for Wretchedness, yet shun the Wretched,
Nursing in some delicious solitude
Their slothful loves and dainty sympathies!
I therefore go, and join head, heart, and hand,
Active and firm, to fight the bloodless fight
Of Science, Freedom, and the Truth in Christ.
—"Reflections" (lines 43–62)

Soon after his autumn 1795 marriage to Sara Fricker, Coleridge left their home in Clevedon, North Somerset. However, he felt guilt at his absence from his wife, and eventually went to live with her family at Redcliffe Hill, Bristol. As he completed The Eolian Harp—composed to commemorate his return to Clevedon—Coleridge composed Reflections on Having Left a Place of Retirement on his absence from Clevedon and later return to be with his wife at Bristol. The poem was published in the October 1796 Monthly Magazine, under the title Reflections on Entering into Active Life. A poem Which Affects Not to be Poetry. Reflections was included in Coleridge's 28 October 1797 collection of poems and the anthologies that followed.

The themes of Reflections are similar to those of The Eolian Harp. They are set in the same location, and both describe Coleridge's relationship with his wife and sexual desire. The reflection on his life within the poem represent an unwillingness to accept his current idyllic life and a rejection of the conclusion drawn in The Eolian Harp. Although the land of Clevedon can bring one closer to God in Coleridge's view, he reflects on how one cannot simply exist in such an area but must actively seek out truth in order to fulfill God's will. The poem details how men feel a need to seek truth like a philosopher while also desiring to simply live in an idyllic natural state. The poem reconciles these desires by claiming that the pursuer of truth can still reflect back on his time when he was simply enjoying nature and God's presence.

Reflections further differs from The Eolian Harp by looking at problems within Coleridge's marriage, especially when the union distracts him from the world outside of his home. The poem expresses desire for solitude and confinement and emphasises the difference between the worlds within and outside of the cottage. Overall, there is focus on the relationship of the private to the public spheres. When engaged with the outside world the narrator is separate from mankind, yet his focus is devoted to helping mankind, which contains religious and political components. The image of "One Life" compels him to abandon the sensual pleasures of the cottage, to pursue a path of altruism.

=== This Lime-Tree Bower My Prison ===
Well, they are gone, and here must I remain,
This lime-tree bower my prison! I have lost
Beauties and feelings, such as would have been
Most sweet to my remembrance even when age
Had dimm'd mine eyes to blindness! They, meanwhile,
Friends, whom I never more may meet again,
On springy heath, along the hill-top edge,
Wander in gladness, and wind down, perchance,
To that still roaring dell, of which I told;
—"This Lime-Tree Bower" (lines 1–9)

During summer 1797, Coleridge spent time with many of his friends, including John Thelwall, William and Dorothy Wordsworth, Charles Lamb, Thomas Poole, and his wife Sara Fricker. During this time, he suffered an accident in which his foot was burned. As a result, he was left alone at Poole's property underneath a lime tree, while Lamb, the Wordsworths and his wife went on a journey across the Quantocks.

The first version of the poem was sent in a letter to Southey and was only 56 lines. The first published edition, in 1800, was 76 lines long. The poem was revised and published under another name in Southey's Annual Anthology. A later revised edition was included in Sibylline Leaves, Coleridge's 1817 collection of poems.

Within the verse, Coleridge seeks to discover the environment that his friends are exploring because he is unable to join them. The poem links the lime-tree bower to the Quantocks where the Wordsworths, Lamb and Fricker were out walking. Although he is separated from them, the poet connects to his distant friends and they are able to share in a common view on life. The poem describes Coleridge's loneliness and solitude throughout, yet he is glad that his friends are able to experience nature. Because of this, he is able to tolerate his prison, which he views as merely physical rather than intellectual.

=== Frost at Midnight ===
Therefore all seasons shall be sweet to thee,
Whether the summer clothe the general earth
With greenness, or the redbreast sit and sing
Betwixt the tufts of snow on the bare branch
Of mossy apple-tree, while the nigh thatch
Smokes in the sun-thaw; whether the eave-drops fall
Heard only in the trances of the blast,
Or if the secret ministry of frost
Shall hang them up in silent icicles,
Quietly shining to the quiet Moon.
—"Frost at Midnight" (lines 65–74)

Frost at Midnight was written in February 1798. It is based on Coleridge's childhood as well as his friendship with Wordsworth, who first exposed Coleridge to the wild beauty of the Lake District. The poem was published in a small work containing his France: An Ode and Fears in Solitude. It was rewritten many times; seven versions have been printed. Of these, the 1798 edition contains six concluding lines that were removed from later editions.

The narrator comes to an understanding of nature while isolated with his thoughts. Nature becomes a comfort; however, the poet remembers the loneliness of childhood when he felt isolated from nature and other people, as if living in a world of strangers. His hope is that his own child, Hartley Coleridge, will experience an easier and more harmonious life.

Although Wordsworth places a similar emphasis on living in harmony with nature in his poetry, Coleridge's view is different from that of Wordsworth's in that he believed that nature represents a physical presence of God's word; this is combined with a Neoplatonic understanding of God that emphasizes the need to understand the divine in order to embrace it.

=== Fears in Solitude ===
O native Britain! O my Mother Isle!
How shouldst thou prove aught else but dear and holy
To me, who from thy lakes and mountain-hills,
Thy clouds, thy quiet dales, thy rocks and seas,
Have drunk in all my intellectual life,
All sweet sensations, all ennobling thoughts,
All adoration of the God in nature,
All lovely and all honourable things,
Whatever makes this mortal spirit feel
The joy and greatness of its future being?
—"Fears in Solitude" (lines 182–191)

Fears in Solitude was written after rumors of a French invasion spread across England. Although Coleridge was opposed to Prime Minister William Pitt's control over the British government, he sided with his homeland. He began work on the poem during April 1798 and it was first published in a small pamphlet along with Frost at Midnight and France: An Ode. It was eventually printed seven times with a later printing removing any anti-Pitt sentiment.

The poem is critical of the corruption Coleridge sees within his own government, but it still displays his loyalty and devotion to England. The poem operates in a circular pattern with its beginning and ending at the Stowey dell. By introducing the historically real possibility of an invasion of England, the narrator announces his determination to protect his family and the dell, along with his fellow Britons. Throughout the poem, there is also an emphasis on the simple life and the narrator desires to return to his previous idyllic lifestyle.

=== The Nightingale: A Conversation Poem ===
'Most musical, most melancholy' bird!
A melancholy bird? Oh! idle thought!
In Nature there is nothing melancholy.
But some night-wandering man, whose heart was pierced
With the remembrance of a grievous wrong,
Or slow distemper, or neglected love,
(And so, poor wretch! filled all things with himself,
And made all gentle sounds tell back the tale
Of his own sorrow) he, and such as he,
First named these notes a melancholy strain.
—"The Nightingale" (lines 13–22)

The Nightingale was written in April 1798, during the same time Coleridge wrote Fears in Solitude. The poem was included in the Lyrical Ballads, a joint publication with Wordsworth. The nightingale is part of a discussion directed to Wordsworths in which Coleridge refutes the traditional association between nightingales and melancholic feelings because of the bird's appearance in the myth of Philomela.

In a break from tradition, the nightingales in Coleridge's poem represented an experience he had with the Wordsworths. The narrative is interrupted by a mysterious female character. In this case, the female is not Coleridge's wife, Sara, a fact which separates The Nightingale from the other poems in the series. The work mentions Hartley, the child they had together, as well as a resonant night in which Coleridge viewed and contemplated the moon. John Keats would later follow Coleridge's depiction and use of nightingale in "Ode to a Nightingale".

=== Dejection: An Ode ===
Joy, virtuous Lady! Joy that ne'er was given,
Save to the pure, and in their purest hour,
Life, and Life's effluence, cloud at once and shower,
Joy, Lady! is the spirit and the power
Which wedding Nature to us gives in dower
A new Earth and new Heaven,
Undreamt of by the sensual and the proud—
Joy is the sweet voice, Joy the luminous cloud—
We in ourselves rejoice!
—"Dejection" (lines 64-72)

Coleridge was living apart from his family in 1802. During this period he intended to write a poem for Sara Hutchinson, with whom he had fallen in love. He sent her the verse on 4 April 1802. The original draft was titled "Letter to Sara Hutchinson", but renamed as Dejection when published. There are many differences between the versions. The original consisted of 340 lines; when published, 139 lines were cut to emphasise two moments in Coleridge's emotional struggle, while many personal elements were removed. The poem was published in The Morning Post on 4 October 1802. The date corresponds with Wordsworth's marriage to Mary Hutchinson.

Dejection was a response to Wordsworth's Immortality Ode. It conveys feelings of dejection, expressed through an inability to write or appreciate nature. Wordsworth is introduced in the poem as a counterbalance to Coleridge; Wordsworth is able to turn his darkness to benefit and accept comfort. However, Coleridge cannot find any positive aspect to his despair, and is paralyzed by his emotions. The poem captures many of the feelings expressed in his earlier works, including his exploration of a problematic childhood and thoughts on his religious beliefs.

=== To William Wordsworth ===
Thy long sustainéd Song finally closed,
And thy deep voice had ceased—yet thou thyself
Wert still before my eyes, and round us both
That happy vision of belovéd faces—
Scarce conscious, and yet conscious of its close
I sate, my being blended in one thought
(Thought was it? or aspiration? or resolve?)
Absorbed, yet hanging still upon the sound—
And when I rose, I found myself in prayer.
—"To William Wordsworth" (lines 104–112)

To William Wordsworth commemorates the time when Coleridge stayed with the Wordsworths during the winter of 1806–1807, and recalls when William Wordsworth read his newly completed The Prelude. Coleridge wrote his poem in response during January 1807, to capture his feelings about his friend's poem. Portions of the verse were printed in the 1809 Friend, however Wordsworth did not wish it to be made public due to the private nature of Coleridge's thoughts. Eventually, it was published in Coleridge's 1817 collection Sibylline Leaves.

The poem begins by summarising the themes of The Prelude, and develops into a discussion of Wordsworth's understanding of his beliefs and their relationship with nature. In the poem, Coleridge is self-critical in a near masochistic manner, holding his poetry and thoughts as inferior to Wordsworth. This is partly because Coleridge believed that Wordsworth was able to find bliss from solitude while he was unable to find anything but pain. Coleridge discusses his youthful hopes to become a great poet and how his ability to write has diminished over time. The poem's admiration of Wordsworth's ability is rendered without jealousy, though he is scornful of his own.

== Themes ==
The Eolian Harp examines Coleridge's understanding of nature within the concept of his "One Life", an idea that came from reflection on his experiences at Clevedon. The conversation poems as a whole are connected to the ideas within The Eolian Harp that deal with the nature and mans' understanding of the universe. In particular, The Eolian Harp express an unease with David Hartley's ideas about necessity. Within Reflections, the idea of "One Life" compels the narrator to abandon the sensual pleasures of the cottage and of nature in order to pursue a path of helping mankind. This Lime-Tree Bower continues the conversation poems theme of "One Life" by linking Coleridge's surroundings with the walk his friends went on. Although they are all separated, Coleridge connects to his distant friends by their mutual experience and appreciation of nature.

Frost at Midnight uses the idea of "One Life" as the poem describes the idea life that Coleridge's child will experience in the countryside. Coleridge hoped that the boy would become a "child of nature" and raised free of the constraints that come from a disconnection from nature. Fears in Solitude describes the unity of mankind and nature, which manifests in the form of fearing for his fellow countrymen in times of invasion. This idea of "One Life", according to Abrams, "best epitomize the Romantic constellation of joy, love, and the shared life".

Both The Eolian Harp and Reflections deal with similar understandings of nature but differ in approach. By Reflections, Coleridge questions his right to simply enjoy nature. The image of nature and other themes reappears in Fear in Solitude, and the later poem even recreates the "Valley of Seclusion" image. Similarly, the compulsion to enter into the world and help mankind is included, but it is altered from being motivated by guilt to a warning message against a possible invasion from outside forces. As such, Fear in Solitude does not seek to leave the location to help mankind, but to stay as a protector over his family.

This Lime-Tree Bower and Frost at Midnight also deal with a similar understanding of nature, and the ideas within This Lime-Tree Bower form the basis for a natural education. Coleridge hoped that his son Hartley would be able to learn through nature in an innocent way. Unlike Wordsworth's nature, Coleridge's has a strong Christian presence and nature is a physical presence of God's word. There is also a connection between Dejection and Frost at Midnight with its emphasis on Coleridge's private life.

== Critical response ==
The poems are considered by many critics to be among Coleridge's finest. The final ten lines of Frost at Midnight were chosen by Harper in 1928 as the "best example of the peculiar kind of blank verse Coleridge had evolved, as natural-seeming as prose, but as exquisitely artistic as the most complicated sonnet." In 1966, Virginia Radley argued, "Although no conversation poem can rightly be said to stand equally with the poems of high imagination [...] certainly "Frost at Midnight" and "This Lime-tree Bower ..." both have within them that quality of heart so essential to these latter poems. Because of this quality, and because of the striking effectiveness of their imagery, these poems can be said to be the true harbingers of Coleridge's greatest poems".

Others agree on the strength of Frost at Midnight. Richard Holmes wrote in 1989 that the poem "is one of the most intricately structured of all the Conversation Poems". Rosemary Ashton argued in 1997 that the poem is "one of [Coleridge's] most delightful conversation poems". Agreeing with this view in 2006, Adam Sisman believes that Frost at Midnight is "perhaps the most beautiful of Coleridge's 'conversation poems'". Other poems in the series received praise, with George Watson, in 1966, claiming that To William Wordsworth "is the last pure example that Coleridge's poetry affords of the conversation poem [...] the poem is extravagant in its very being." Also, Holmes describes The Eolian Harp as a "beautiful Conversation Poem".

Not all of the poems have been well received. Watson believes that Fears in Solitude "shows how precarious Coleridge's new achievement was. It is a shameless return to the older, effusive manner, evidently written in a white heat of patriotic indignation against the degradation of English public opinion during the French wars, and it is only by stretching charity that it can be considered a conversation poem at all." Holmes simply claims Fears in Solitude as "one of the most difficult of [Coleridge's] Conversation Poems". In discussing The Nightingale, Ashton writes that, "Bantering though this is, and, however, beautiful the final lines about Hartley are, 'The Nightingale' is as a whole a less successful poem than the other conversation poems. It has rather a blank at the centre, just where the others pivot on a significant controlling idea."
