= Early life of Samuel Taylor Coleridge =

Samuel Taylor Coleridge was born on 21 October 1772. The youngest of 14 children, he was educated after his father's death and excelled in classics. He attended Christ's Hospital and Jesus College, Cambridge. While attending college, he befriended two other Romanticists, Charles Lamb and Robert Southey, the latter causing him to eventually drop out of college and pursue both poetic and political ambitions.

Although he often wrote poetry, his talent did not manifest until after 1794, when he transitioned into what would later be described as Romantic poetry. During this time, he worked with Southey on developing an ideal political government called Pantisocracy. Eventually, Coleridge would give up his political ambitions and focus on his poetic career.

== Parents ==
Coleridge's grandfather, the elder John Coleridge, was a weaver by trade, and, as Coleridge claimed to William Godwin, he was also "half–poet and half–madman". In 1719, his wife Mary gave birth to John, the younger. Their son was sent to the Crediton Grammar School until the age of 15, when the bankruptcy of the elder prompted the younger to seek employment. While the younger despaired at his fate, a random gentleman discovered him and offered him a job as an usher for a school. While working for the school, he took up a wife, had four daughters, and pursued his studies. In 1747, he was accepted into Sidney Sussex College, Cambridge, at the age of 28, and studied classics and Hebrew. After finishing college, the younger John Coleridge became a teacher in Devon.

A few years after moving to Devon, the younger John Coleridge's wife died. In 1753, he married Ann Bowden, a woman from Exmoor of a modest background. They had 9 sons and 1 daughter, with Samuel Coleridge being the youngest. By 1772, the year of Samuel's birth, John Coleridge was a well-respected vicar of the parish and had advanced to the position of Head Master of The King's Free Grammar School at Ottery. The positions brought the family only a small income, but they did earn the friendship of local baronet, Stafford Northcote. In addition to his employment, John Coleridge also wrote a few religious works and a Latin grammar.

== Childhood ==
At six years old I remember to have read Belisarius, Robinson Crusoe, and Philip Quarll - and then I found the Arabian Nights' Entertainments - one tale of which (the tale of a man who was compelled to seek for a pure virgin) made so deep an impression on me (I had read it in the evening while my mother was mending stockings) that I was haunted by spectres whenever I was in the dark — and I distinctly remember the anxious and fearful eagerness with which I used to watch the window in which the books lay — and whenever the sun lay upon them, I would seize it, carry it by the wall, and bask, and read.

— Coleridge to Thomas Poole

Coleridge was born on 21 October 1772 in the rural town of Ottery St Mary, Devon, England, the youngest of the children. Of his childhood, Coleridge suggests that he "took no pleasure in boyish sports" but instead read "incessantly" and played by himself. He was close to his father and distant from his mother, a woman whom he would provoke in an attempt to receive her attention. At the age of seven, Coleridge ran away from home after an argument with his older brother Frank that provoked his mother to punish him. He would tell the story to his friends in his later years with particular emphasis on his mother and "how miserable my Mother must be" about him running away. A search party was formed with family friend Northcote eventually being the one to find Coleridge and bring him home. This event appeared in Coleridge's later poems including "Monody on the Death of Chatterton" (1829).

John Coleridge died in 1781 when Samuel was 8 years-old. Since his father was a source of happiness for the young Coleridge, the death affected him deeply. He was also the only son left at home; Frank was enlisted in the Navy just prior to John's death and Coleridge's other brothers were busy with careers or their own families. One of the brothers, George, took responsibility for Coleridge. Of him, Coleridge declared that he was "father, brother, and every thing". Without his father around, Coleridge and his family were forced to move from the schoolhouse to a nearby home with a loss of their income. Soon after, one of John Coleridge's former students, Judge Buller, arranged for Coleridge to be sent to Christ's Hospital. Coleridge was accepted after his mother petitioned on 28 March 1782, along with Fulwood Smerdon, John Coleridge's successor, and Samuel Taylor, Coleridge's godfather, that he be accepted. After acceptance, he attended a school in Hertford to prepare him for Christ's Hospital.

=== Education ===
Christ's Hospital was founded in London by Edward VI in 1552 and intended to educate orphans and the poor. By the 18th century, it catered to educating the children of poor gentry. The age of the institution and the traditions of the school soon became a point of pride for Coleridge. He remained there throughout his childhood, studying and writing poetry, and it was at the school that he studied the works of Virgil and William Lisle Bowles. While at school, Coleridge was often in the school's sanatorium for a mild feverish condition and spent time by himself reading and studying classics. Although he was known for his speech aptitude, he was also known for his poor manner of dress. He also composed poetry, mostly imitations of Milton, Gray and others.

I enjoyed the inestimable advantage of a very sensible, though at the same time, a very severe master ... I learnt from him, that Poetry, even that of the loftiest, and, seemingly, that of the wildest odes, had a logic of its own ... In our own English compositions ... he showed no mercy to phrase, metaphor, or image, unsupported by a sound sense, or where the same sense might have been conveyed with equal force and dignity in plainer words ... Be this as it may, there was one custom of our master's, which I cannot pass over in silence, because I think it ... worthy of imitation. He would often permit our theme exercises, ... to accumulate, till each lad had four or five to be looked over. Then placing the whole number abreast on his desk, he would ask the writer, why this or that sentence might not have found as appropriate a place under this or that other thesis: and if no satisfying answer could be returned, and two faults of the same kind were found in one exercise, the irrevocable verdict followed, the exercise was torn up, and another on the same subject to be produced, in addition to the tasks of the day.

— Coleridge's Biographia Literaria

During that time, Coleridge became a friend of Charles Lamb. Unlike Lamb, Coleridge did not have family in London to spend his vacation with, which caused the young Coleridge strain. Over the nine years that he attended the school, he only returned home 3 or 4 times. He experienced loneliness throughout the time until two of his brothers, Luke and George, came to London. He wrote many letters to his brothers, but only one to his mother during his time in London. Luke was important to Coleridge and Luke's moving to Devon affected the schoolboy. Coleridge made other friends, including Charles Le Grice, but this could not keep Coleridge from missing Luke, to whom Coleridge would write often. In one letter, Coleridge wrote: "Legrice, and I, are very polite, very civil, and very cold. So that I doubly lament your absence, as I have now no one, to whom I can open my heart in full confidence."

With the letter was one of Coleridge's first poems, "Easter Holidays", which discusses both present happiness and future sorrow. Another poem written that year was "Dura Navis", a poem that is possibly about his brother Frank and describes a state of loneliness and solitude along with battles at sea and eventual cannibalism of the crew. He continued to write poetry, including "Monody" (1790) which compares himself with Thomas Chatterton, a young poet who had committed suicide. He composed "The Destruction of the Bastile" that responded to the fall of the Bastille during the previous year. The poem contains Coleridge's cheering on of events within revolutionary France and a possible revolution in England. While he stayed at the school's sanatorium recovering from illness, Coleridge wrote the poem "Pain: Composed in Sickness". It was also during this time that Coleridge was first prescribed opium, in the form of laudanum, as a treatment of his fever. The deaths of his brother Luke and sister Ann in 1791 near the end of his school career prompted Coleridge to write the sonnet "On Receiving an Account that his only Sister's Death was Inevitable".

By 1788, Coleridge befriended a few other boys including Robert Allen and Tom Evans. Together, the three boys would visit Evans's home in London. It was there that Coleridge met Mary Evans, the oldest of Tom's three sisters, and Coleridge became infatuated with her. He also became attached to Tom's mother, a woman that later took care of the boys over Coleridge's 1791 Christmas vacation for college. Coleridge later told George, "I have indeed experienced from her a tenderness scarcely inferior to the solicitude of maternal affection." This affection developed to the point of Coleridge composing a poem "To Disappointment" that places Mrs. Evans in the role of his mother. His involvement with the family was the first of Coleridge's long relationship with predominately female circles of friends. His feelings on the matter combined affection and sexual attraction in a way that he was uncomfortable with, and Coleridge was to later remark that he was unable to have sex with his wife because he viewed her in a sisterly manner.

At the end of his time at Christ's Hospital, he received a scholarship to attend Jesus College, Cambridge and was to begin his time at the college in September 1791. During his transition from Christ's Hospital, Coleridge composed "On Quitting School for College", a poem that contains his saying good bye to his previous homes in a manner that was more positive than how he truly felt about those places. Although Coleridge enjoyed some of the moments at school, he believed that his time was that of deprivation and focused mostly on future happiness that would not actualize in the way he had hoped.

== College ==
From 1791 until 1794, Coleridge attended Jesus College. He received £70 per year in scholarships to attend the college with £30 from the Rustat Scholarship, a scholarship for the sons of Anglican clergymen. However, this was only enough to provide Coleridge with a meagre living at Jesus College, which he would complain of often. This was compounded by the debt that Coleridge began to accrue and avoided paying. It is uncertain how Coleridge used his income, but it is possible that he ran into debt because of indulgence in wine and opium, the drug that he continued to use throughout college. It is also possible that he spent his money on prostitutes, which he deeply regretted and even had nightmares over. He was prone to sexual nightmares, and he recorded one such dream in 1803 about being pursued by a prostitute at both Christ's Hospital and Jesus College.

Although he had few friends at first, he befriended Thomas Middleton, a student at Pembroke College, who acted as "patron and protector" according to Coleridge's account in Biographia Literaria. His education was spent working in the chapel and attending lectures in both mathematics and classics. Coleridge also wrote many poems and submitted some for various competitions. In July 1792 he won the Browne Gold Medal for a Sapphic ode that he wrote on the slave trade. Later in December, he competed for the Craven Scholarship but did not win. He also wrote more personal poems, including one written about lost love accompanying a letter to Mary Evans on 13 February 1792. Throughout college and in his poetry, Coleridge involved himself with politics, including issues around the French Revolution, the slave trade, and the abolition of the Test and Corporation Acts. Coleridge became involved with issues surrounding the Test and Corporation Acts when a tutor at Jesus College, William Frend, was placed on trial during early 1793 by the Fellows of Jesus College for being a Unitarian and no longer supporting Anglicanism. Although Frend was removed from the college in April 1793, he influenced Coleridge's political and religious beliefs to the point of Coleridge eventually working as a Unitarian preacher after leaving Jesus College.

Later in 1793, Coleridge competed for the Browne Medal but his ode on astronomy only won him second place. He wrote less poetry except for in Latin. One English poem was included in a letter to George in July 1793 called "The rose". Another poem was written during summer vacation called the "Songs of the Pixies", which described a cave near his home in Ottery that was called "the Pixies' Parlour". The poem celebrates the moment and also describes Coleridge's expectations to be crowned with a poet's laurels. Coleridge continued to accrue debt, 150 pounds by the summer vacation, which prompted him to leave college at the end of 1793. He used the last of his money to purchase an Irish Lottery ticket, an event which inspired him to write a poem on the matter which was published by the Morning Chronicle on 7 November 1793. Afterwards, he read a poem to a group of students at Trinity College, "Lines on an Autumnal Evening", which was heard by Christopher Wordsworth, brother to Coleridge's eventual companion and friend, William Wordsworth.

On 2 December 1793, he enlisted in the 15th (The King's) Regiment of (Light) Dragoons using the false name "Silas Tomkyn Comberbache", needing a means to provide himself with food. He was a poor soldier and a struggled for three months, trading his abilities to write in return for other soldiers helping him with his horse and other matters. Coleridge's true identity was revealed whilst he was serving in Reading. His captain, Nathaniel Ogle, son of the Rev. Newton Ogle, Dean of Winchester Cathedral, found a plaintive Latin exclamation written on the wall of the stables. On discovering its author was Comberbache, Ogle quickly uncovered the real persona behind it and Coleridge's old Christ's Hospital schoolmate, G. L. Tuckett, was told of the enlistment and he informed George Coleridge. His brothers arranged for his discharge a few months later under the reason of "insanity", and George paid off Coleridge's debt. Eventually, Coleridge was readmitted to Jesus College in April 1794 and began writing poetry again. During June 1794, he advertised an edition of poems called Imitations from the Modern Latin Poets and toured Wales with Joseph Hucks. Before they arrived at Wales, they visited Robert Allen at Oxford and met Robert Southey. Coleridge and Southey shared similar political views and the two bonded immediately. Eventually, both would leave college without attaining their degrees.

== Early career ==
Coleridge's transition into being a Romantic poet began in 1794 when he began to focus on nature in his poetry. This was a direct influence from his relationship with Southey and the emotional connection that they shared as friends, and their friendship developed to the point of Coleridge no longer pursuing Mary Evans. The two encouraged each other to write poetry, with Coleridge adapting his 1791 poem "Happiness" for this purpose. They also encouraged each other in their liberal political beliefs and visited the British proponent of democracy Tom Poole in 1794. He encouraged the two towards Southey's idea of Pantisocracy. Coleridge continued with his ideas of political reform and democracy, and, in 1795, he responded to the sedition trial of political activists Joseph Gerrald, Maurice Margarot, Thomas Muir, and Thomas Fyshe Palmer in a "Moral and Political Lecture" at Bristol. The lecture included a reading of Southey's poem titled "To the Exiled Patriots" which condemns the trial.

When Coleridge's and Southey's plan to create a Pantisocratic nation in the Americas during the summer of 1794, Coleridge determined to marry Sara Fricker, sister of Southey's fiancée Edith Fricker. In order to fund the trip and the marriage, Coleridge was determined to have published his poetic-dramatic work, The Fall of Robespierre. The closet drama was written partly by Coleridge, the first act, and partly by Southey, the second and third, and it describes the events of Robespierre's final moments and his execution and that of 21 of his supporters along with denouncing tyranny. The work was published by Benjamin Flower and only under Coleridge's name. When the summer ended, Coleridge left for London and began to spend time with his school friends, including Lamb. Soon after, he stopped his communication with Sara Fricker, which caused problems between him and Southey. Matters were compounded when Mary Evans wrote to Coleridge during Autumn 1794 after hearing of Coleridge's and Southey's Pantisocratic plans; she wanted him to reconsider the idea. This letter was followed by letters from his brother George which also asked him to reconsider.

The letters affected Coleridge deeply and he visited George in November 1794. Coleridge still desired to be with Mary, but during the visit, he found out that Mary was engaged. After hearing the news, Coleridge determined that he was not in love with Sara Fricker. In December, he began to work on his poetry and befriended many of the liberal political activists in London. These new friends included William Godwin and Thomas Holcroft, two men that Coleridge agreed with politically but differed theologically. Coleridge would dispute with the two over religious questions, and Coleridge was able to boast of turning them from strong atheistic views. Coleridge, an admirer of Godwin and Godwin's Political Justice, dedicated a poem to Godwin as part of his poetry series called "Sonnets on Eminent Characters" that was published at the end of 1794 in the Morning Chronicle. Of his other poetry, Coleridge wrote a poem about Christ's nativity titled "Religious Musings", which was not published until 1796. Eventually, Southey grew tired of waiting for Coleridge to return from London and travelled to meet his friend in January 1795.

When Southey and Coleridge met, they disputed over plans for their Pantisocracy; Southey wanted to travel to Wales to prepare and Coleridge wanted to work in London to earn money. Southey was able to convince Coleridge to return to Bristol and the two returned during January 1795. Soon after his arrival, Coleridge began talking to Sara Fricker again and returned to his plans of marrying her. He also befriended many political liberals, including the bookseller Joseph Cottle, the later publisher of Coleridge's and Wordsworth's Lyrical Ballads. During this time, Coleridge began to raise money through lectures on politics, of which he gave three during February. His first lecture was called "A Moral and Political Lecture", given at the Bristol Corn Market, attacked the British government and William Pitt. The other two lectures were reworked to form a pamphlet entitled Conciones ad Populum. Or Addresses to the People, published on 3 December 1795. In the pamphlet, Coleridge uses the image of the winter 1794 famine in asking for political changes. Coleridge continued to lecture during the year, giving one on 16 June on the topic of abolishing the slave trade and one on 26 November in opposition to the Gagging Acts. The November lecture was expanded into the pamphlet The Plot Discovered, which was published in early December before the Gagging Acts were passed. Politics was not the only topic Coleridge lectured on in 1795; he gave "Six Lectures on Revealed Religion" during the spring that combined Unitarian religion and political ideas together.

In August, Southey was offered by his uncle to travel together to Lisbon and afterwards to train as a lawyer. This upset Coleridge because he saw this as an act of betrayal and a destruction to their plans of Pantisocracy. There is no evidence that the two kept in contact for many months. During that time, Coleridge continued his engagement to Sara Fricker and wrote two poems to her, "The Eolian Harp", 20 August 1795, and "Lines Written at Shurton Bars", September 1795. He kept to his promise and married her on 4 October 1795. On 14 November, Southey married Edith with Coleridge writing a letter the day before stating that "You are lost to me, because you are lost to Virtue". In the letter, Coleridge attacks Southey for causing the divide between the two of them and for pursuing money instead of their beliefs.

Coleridge's and Southey's relationship dissolved, and Coleridge was without a close friend. However, he met William Wordsworth, a fellow poet, in September 1795 and would eventually become close with him. Their relationship did not yet start, and in January 1796 Coleridge was travelling to find subscribers for a proposed political magazine called The Watchman. During this time, he met with Erasmus Darwin and discussed both politics and religion; Darwin's atheism bothered Coleridge but he respected Darwin's philosophical views. He returned in February and The Watchman was first published on 1 March 1796 with the purpose of attacking the Gagging Acts. It was printed every 8 days, and the second on 9 March attacked the practice of Church-led fasting. The paper was soon discontinued on 13 May when Coleridge ran out of money to print it. The lack of funds was compounded by illness in Sara's family and the death of her brother-in-law. He was able to make money on the publication of Poems on Various Subjects, 16 April 1796, and by giving lectures about Roman history.

Coleridge's Poems on Various Subjects was decently received and a second edition would be published in 1797 containing more poems. However, he lacked a steady income and began making plans on how to provide for his family. In May 1796, Coleridge resumed his friendship with Lamb after Lamb spent time in a madhouse. Also in May, a group of Coleridge's friends decided to give a small income in return for their appreciation of his talents, but he still needed more. He took on the son of a rich Quaker, Charles Lloyd, as a boarder, which allowed him to provide for his family. While making the deal on 19 September 1796, he received word that his wife gave birth to their son, Hartley. Coleridge began making plans for moving to the countryside at Nether Stowey and did so, much to the displeasure of Lamb. Eventually, Wordsworth joined him along with visits from Poole, Lamb, and other associates. He partially mended his friendship with Southey and contributed verse to Southey's Joan of Arc epic, lines later to be put together in the poem "The Destiny of Nations". In February 1797, Coleridge reviewed Matthew Lewis's The Monk for the Critical Review and began writing Osorio, a play requested by Sheridan for Theatre Royal, Drury Lane. While these works and others were being composed, Coleridge began to bond with Wordsworth, which started a close, poetic relationship that would influence both of their careers and inspire their greatest works.

== Pantisocracy ==
Coleridge and Southey came up with a theoretical political government named Pantisocracy. Originally named Pantocracy, the system was intended be a perfect, egalitarian society formed in America. Poole discussed their ideal government during their visit, and had hope for what the system would accomplish. However, Poole thought that the system would have little chance for succeeding, and he advised Coleridge and Southey that there would be problems regarding females and marriage contracts within the society. As plans were developed, they formed a group of people that would become part of the society, including Southey's mother, Southey's fiancée and her family, and a few others that they knew. Coleridge and Southey also encouraged the group to study agriculture and carpentry to help with the settlement.

When locals heard of the group's plans for starting a new society in the Americas, rumours were spread and criticism was lodged against Pantisocracy. This was compounded when Southey's aunt, with whom he was living, found out about both the idea and Southey's intention in marrying Edith Fricker, a person that his aunt felt was below his station. His aunt immediately stopped talking to him and kicked him out of her house. When Coleridge left for London, his thoughts about Pantisocracy began to change and he backed off his role in the matter. This was partly to blame for the intervention by Mary Evans and his brother George, and partly about Southey advocating for a master class and a servant class in their new society, all of which upset Coleridge. The idea did not completely collapse until Southey abandoned the plans in August 1795 in order to become a lawyer.

== Early works ==
Most of Coleridge's juvenalia was posthumously published. Those written while he attended Christ's Hospitals were imitations of conventional models of poetry during the late 18th century. In particular, he focused on John Milton's L'Allegro, Il Penseroso, and his Lycidas, along with the poems of Collins, Gray, and Thomson. In terms of form, Coleridge relied on many abstract nouns that he would mark with capitalisation, and his nouns were constantly modified with a set of two adjectives. He did not start working with his own poetic form until 1794. Although they don't provide a sense of where Coleridge developed his poetry later, the school-age poems do give insight into Coleridge's thoughts and feelings during those years.

When Thomas Middleton gave Coleridge an edition of William Lisle Bowles's Sonnets, he was inspired by the poems and even wrote a sonnet to Bowles in praise of the poems' language in 1794. Other poets, including William Cowper and his conversational poem, The Task (1785), also served as an influence in terms of how to compose diction within poetry. Coleridge explained his feelings about those that influenced him in a letter to John Thelwall written on 17 December 1796, "But do not let us introduce an act of Uniformity against Poets — I have room enough in my brain to admire, aye & almost equally, the head and fancy of Akenside, and the heart and fancy of Bowles, the solemn Lordliness of Milton, & the divine chit chat of Cowper."

It was also in 1794 when Coleridge began to emphasize nature in his works and transitioned into a Romantic poet. During the summer of that year, he worked closely with Southey and co-wrote the political drama The Fall of Robespierre, but it was not a success and lacked merit. However, his poetry took off after reading Schiller's play, Robbers, and composing a sonnet in response dedicated to Schiller during December near the time that he composed his sonnet to Bowles. The Bowles poem was included in the "Sonnets on Eminent Characters" series along with poems dedicated to Edmund Burke, Thomas Erskine, Godwin, Southey, Kosciusko, Pitt, Joseph Priestley, and Sheridan.

Coleridge spent much of his time working on pamphlets and lecturing, especially on topics of political reform. He spoke often on liberal ideas and condemned practices such as slavery and movement within the British Parliament to expand sedition laws. When he spoke on religion, he emphasized Unitarianism and how it was a middle ground between the problems of Anglicanism and the problems of atheism. His religio-political views were influenced by the images found in the works of Spenser, Milton, and Bunyan, and his ideas were similar to those expounded by Priestley and David Harley. He especially disapproved notions of the Trinity and of Christian mysteries early on and instead substituted redemption without need for dogma. By 1805, he would change his views and become more Orthodox.
