= Kubla Khan =

Poem by Samuel Taylor Coleridge

- or A Vision in a Dream
- by Samuel Taylor Coleridge
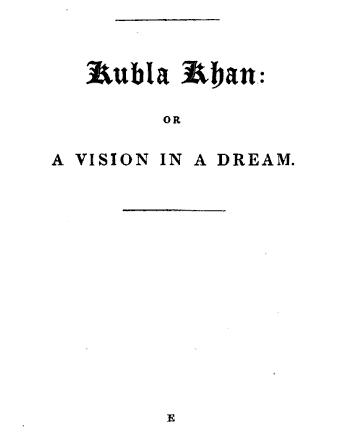
- Title page of Kubla Khan (1816)
- Written: October 1797
- Country: United Kingdom
- Language: English
- Form: Fragment
- Meter: Iambic tetrameter, iambic pentameter
- Rhyme scheme: abbaacc in some parts, couplets in others
- Publisher: John Murray
- Publication date: 1816
- Lines: 54

Full text
- Kubla Khan at Wikisource

Kubla Khan: or A Vision in a Dream (/ˈkuːblə ˈkɑːn/) is a poem written by Samuel Taylor Coleridge, completed in 1797 and published in 1816. It is sometimes given the subtitles "A Vision in a Dream" and "A Fragment." According to Coleridge's preface to Kubla Khan, the poem was composed one night after he experienced an opium-influenced dream after reading a work describing Xanadu, the summer capital of the Mongol-led Yuan dynasty of China founded by Kublai Khan (Emperor Shizu of Yuan). Upon waking, he set about writing lines of poetry that came to him from the dream until he was interrupted by "a person on business from Porlock". The poem could, according to Coleridge, not be completed according to its original 200–300 line plan, as the interruption caused him to forget the lines. He left it unpublished and kept it for private readings for his friends until 1816 when, at the prompting of Lord Byron, it was published.

Some of Coleridge's contemporaries denounced the poem and questioned his story of its origin. It was not until years later that critics began to openly admire the poem. Most modern critics now view Kubla Khan as one of Coleridge's three great poems, along with The Rime of the Ancient Mariner and Christabel. The poem is considered one of the most famous examples of Romanticism in English poetry, and is one of the most frequently anthologized poems in the English language. The manuscript is a permanent exhibit at the British Library in London.

== Poem ==
The poem is divided into three irregular stanzas, which move loosely between different times and places.

The first stanza begins with a fanciful description of the origin of Kublai Khan's capital Xanadu (lines 1–2). It is described as being near the river Alph, which passes through caves before reaching a dark, 'sunless' sea (lines 3–5). Ten miles of land were surrounded with fortified walls (lines 6–7), encompassing lush gardens and forests (lines 8–11).

The second stanza describes a mysterious canyon (lines 12–16). A hydrothermal explosion erupted from the canyon (lines 17–19), throwing rubble into the air (lines 20–23) and forming the source of the sacred river Alph (line 24). The river wandered through the woods, then reached the caves and dark sea described in the first stanza (lines 25–28). Kubla Khan, present for the eruption, heard a prophecy of war (lines 29–30). An indented section presents an image of the pleasure-dome reflected on the water, surrounded by the sound of the geyser above ground and the river underground (lines 31–34). A final un-indented couplet describes the dome again (lines 35–36).

The third stanza shifts to the first-person perspective of the poem's speaker. He once saw a woman in a vision playing a dulcimer (lines 37–41). If he could revive her song within himself, he says, he would revive the pleasure dome itself with music (lines 42–47). Those who heard would also see themselves there, and cry out a warning (lines 48–49). Their warning concerns an alarming male figure (line 50). The stanza ends with instructions and a warning, to carry out a ritual because he has consumed the food of Paradise (lines 51–54).

== Composition and publication ==
=== Date of composition ===
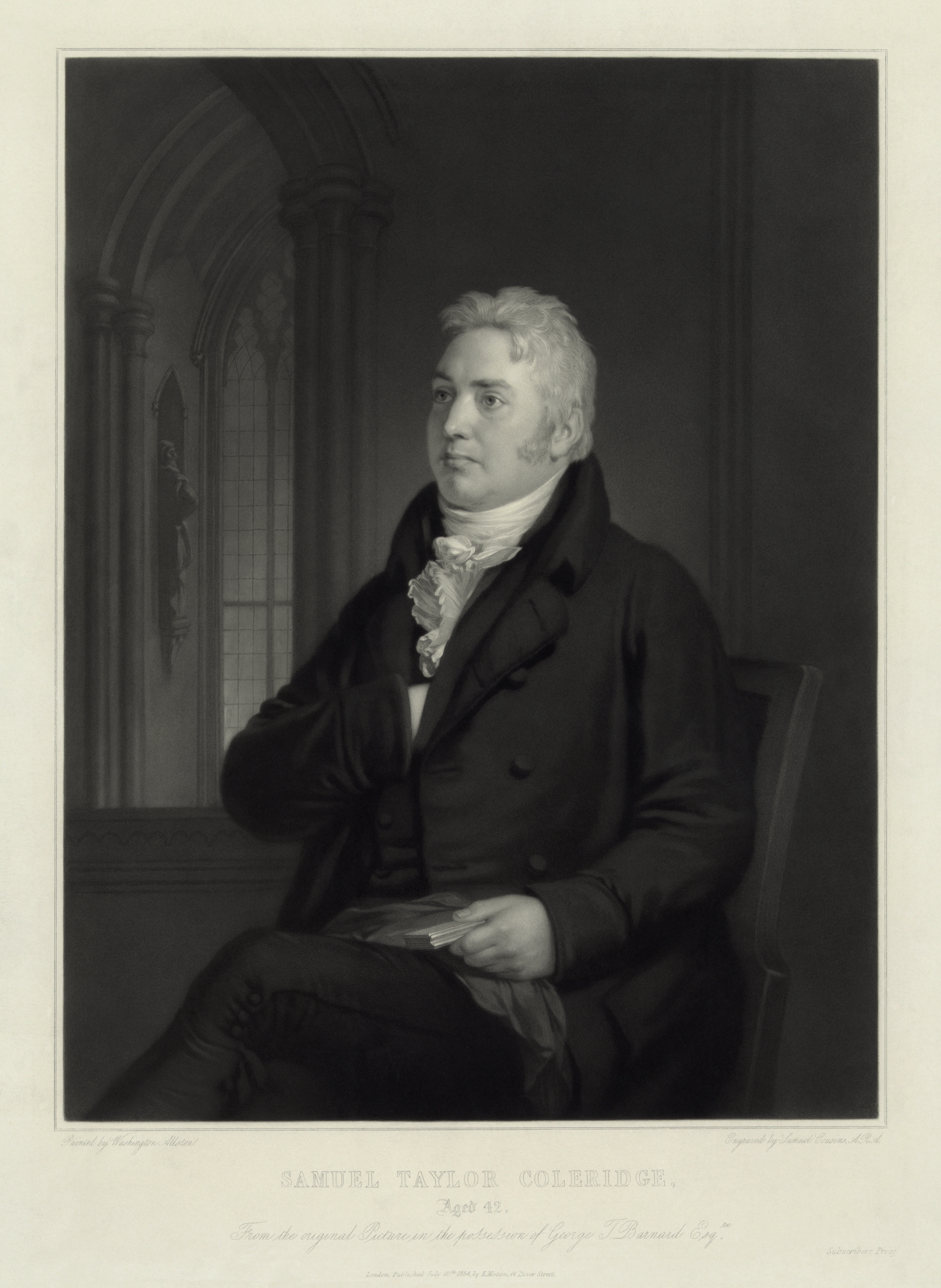
Coleridge, 1814

Kubla Khan was likely written in October 1797, though the precise date and circumstances of the first composition of Kubla Khan are slightly ambiguous, due to limited direct evidence. Coleridge usually dated his poems, but did not date Kubla Khan, and did not mention the poem directly in letters to his friends.

Coleridge's descriptions of the poem's composition attribute it to 1797. In a manuscript in Coleridge's handwriting (known as the Crewe manuscript), a note by Coleridge says that it was composed "in the fall of the year, 1797." In the preface to the first published edition of the poem, in 1816, Coleridge says that it was composed during an extended stay he had made in Somerset during "the summer of the year 1797." On 14 October 1797, Coleridge wrote a letter to John Thelwall which, although it does not directly mention Kubla Khan, expresses many of the same feelings as in the poem, (Note: "I should much wish, like the Indian Vishna, to float about along an infinite ocean cradled in the flower of the Lotos, & wake once in a million years for a few minutes – just to know I was going to sleep a million years more...I can at times feel strong the beauties, you describe, in themselves, & for themselves – but more frequently all things appear little – all the knowledge, that can be acquired, child's play – the universe itself – what but an immense heap of little things?...My mind feels as if it ached to behold & know something great – something one & indivisible – and it is only in the faith of this that rocks or waterfalls, mountains or caverns give me the sense of sublimity or majesty!") suggesting that these themes were on his mind. All of these details have led to the consensus of an October 1797 composition date.

A May 1798 composition date is sometimes proposed because the first written mention of the poem is in Dorothy Wordsworth's journal of October 1798, where she mentions "carrying Kubla to a fountain". October 1799 has also been suggested because by then Coleridge would have been able to read Robert Southey's Thalaba the Destroyer, a work which drew on the same sources as Kubla Khan. At both time periods, Coleridge was again in the area of Ash Farm, near Culbone Church, where Coleridge consistently described composing the poem. However, the October 1797 composition date is more widely accepted.

=== Composition in a dream ===
In September 1797, Coleridge lived in Nether Stowey in the southwest of England and spent much of his time walking through the nearby Quantock Hills with his fellow poet William Wordsworth and Wordsworth's sister Dorothy (his route today is memorialised as the "Coleridge Way"). Some time between 9 and 14 October 1797, when Coleridge says he had completed the tragedy Osorio, he left Stowey for Lynton. On his return journey, he became sick and rested at Ash Farm, located near Culbone Church and one of the few places to seek shelter on his route. There, he had a dream which inspired the poem.

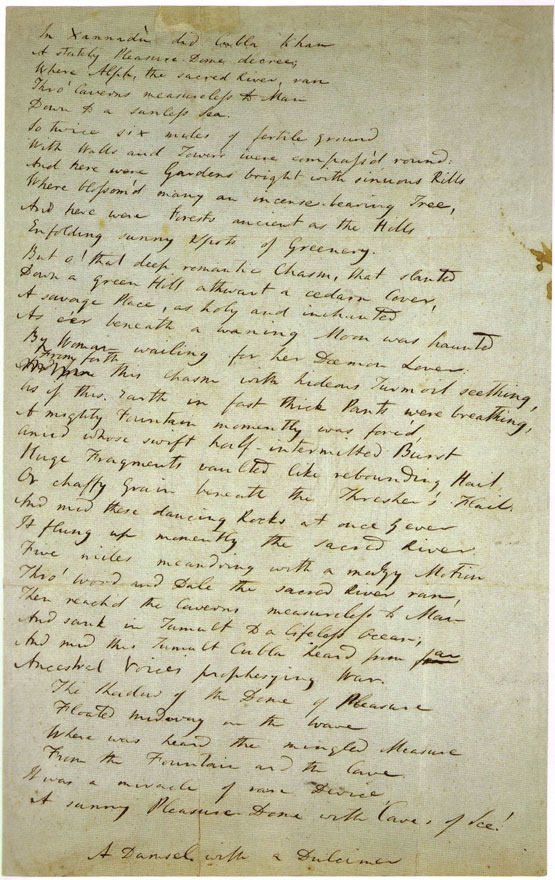
The Crewe manuscript, handwritten by Coleridge himself some time before the poem was published in 1816

Coleridge described the circumstances of his dream and the poem in two places: on a manuscript copy written some time before 1816, and in the preface to the printed version of the poem published in 1816. The manuscript states: "This fragment with a good deal more, not recoverable, composed, in a sort of Reverie brought on by two grains of Opium taken to check a dysentry, at a Farm House between Porlock & Linton, a quarter of a mile from Culbone Church." The printed preface describes his location as "a lonely farm house between Porlock and Linton, on the Exmoor confines of Somerset and Devonshire," and embellishes the events into a narrative which has sometimes been seen as part of the poem itself.

According to the extended preface narrative, Coleridge was reading Purchas his Pilgrimes by Samuel Purchas, and fell asleep after reading about Kublai Khan. Then, he says, he "continued for about three hours in a profound sleep... during which time he had the most vivid confidence, that he could not have composed less than from two or three hundred lines ... On Awaking he appeared to himself to have a distinct recollection of the whole, and taking his pen, ink, and paper, instantly and eagerly wrote down the lines that are here preserved." The passage continues with a famous account of an interruption: "At this moment he was unfortunately called out by a person on business from Porlock... and on his return to his room, found, to his no small surprise and mortification, that though he still retained some vague and dim recollection of the general purpose of the vision, yet, with the exception of some eight or ten scattered lines and images, all the rest had passed away." The "person on business from Porlock" later became a term to describe interrupted genius. When John Livingston Lowes taught the poem, he told his students "If there is any man in the history of literature who should be hanged, drawn, and quartered, it is the man on business from Porlock."

There are some problems with Coleridge's account, especially the claim to have a copy of Purchas with him. It was a rare book, unlikely to be at a "lonely farmhouse", nor would an individual carry it on a journey; the folio was heavy and almost 1,000 pages in size. It is possible that the words of Purchas were merely remembered by Coleridge and that the depiction of immediately reading the work before falling asleep was to suggest that the subject came to him accidentally. Critics have also noted that unlike the manuscript, which says he had taken two grains of opium, the printed version of this story says only that "In consequence of a slight indisposition, an anodyne had been prescribed." The image of himself that Coleridge provides is of a dreamer who reads works of lore and not as an opium addict. Instead, the effects of the opium, as described, are intended to suggest that he was not used to its effects.

According to some critics, the second stanza of the poem, forming a conclusion, was composed at a later date and was possibly disconnected from the original dream.

=== Publication ===
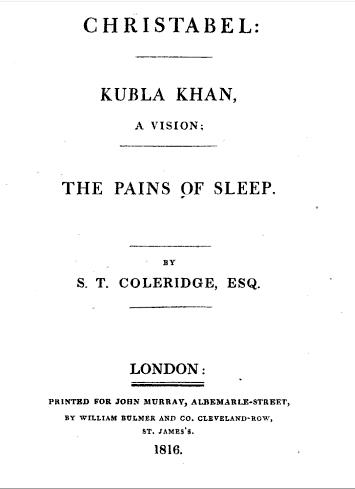
Title page of Christabel, Kubla Khan, and the Pains of Sleep (1816)

After its composition, Coleridge periodically read the poem to friends, as to the Wordsworths in 1798, but did not seek to publish it. Coleridge's friend, the author Mary Robinson wrote a response to the poem titled, "To the Poet Coleridge," which was first published in the October, 17, 1800 edition of The Morning Post, and was later included in her Poetical Works compilation in 1806. In 1808 an anonymous contributor to the Monthly Repertory of English Literature quoted two lines from it in a book review.

The poem was set aside until 1815 when Coleridge compiled manuscripts of his poems for a collection titled Sibylline Leaves. It did not feature in that volume, but Coleridge did read the poem to Lord Byron on 10 April 1816. (Note: Leigh Hunt, the poet and essayist, witnessed the event and wrote, "He recited his 'Kubla Khan' one morning to Lord Byron, in his Lordship's house in Piccadilly, when I happened to be in another room. I remember the other's coming away from him, highly struck with his poem, and saying how wonderfully he talked. This was the impression of everyone who heard him.")

Byron persuaded Coleridge to publish the poem, and on 12 April 1816, a contract was drawn up with the publisher John Murray for £80. The Preface of Kubla Khan explained that it was printed "at the request of a poet of great and deserved celebrity, and as far as the author's own opinions are concerned, rather as a psychological curiosity, than on the ground of any supposed poetic merits." Coleridge's wife discouraged the publication, (Note: She wrote to Thomas Poole, "Oh! when will he ever give his friends anything but pain? he has been so unwise as to publish his fragments of 'Christabel' & 'Kubla-Khan'...we were all sadly vexed when we read the advertisement of these things.") and Charles Lamb, a poet and friend of Coleridge, expressed mixed feelings, worrying that the printed version of the poem couldn't capture the power of the recited version. (Note: Lamb wrote to Wordsworth: "Coleridge is printing Xtabel by Lord Byron's recommendation to Murray, with what he calls a vision of Kubla Khan – which said vision he repeats so enchantingly that it irradiates & brings Heaven & Elysian bowers into my parlour while he sings or says it; but there is an observation: 'never tell thy dreams,' and I am almost afraid that 'Kubla Khan' is an owl that won't bear daylight. I fear lest it should be discovered by the lantern of typography and clear reducing to letters, no better than nonsense or no sense.")

Kubla Khan was published with Christabel and "The Pains of Sleep" on 25 May 1816. Coleridge included the subtitle "A Fragment" to defend against criticism of the poem's incomplete nature. The original published version of the work was separated into 2 stanzas, with the first ending at line 30. The poem was printed four times in Coleridge's life, with the final printing in his Poetical Works of 1834. In the final work, Coleridge added the expanded subtitle "Or, A Vision in a Dream. A Fragment". Printed with Kubla Khan was a preface that stated a dream provided Coleridge the lines. In some later anthologies of Coleridge's poetry, the preface is dropped along with the subtitle denoting its fragmentary and dream nature. Sometimes, the preface is included in modern editions but lacks both the first and final paragraphs.

== Sources ==
=== Purchas and Marco Polo ===
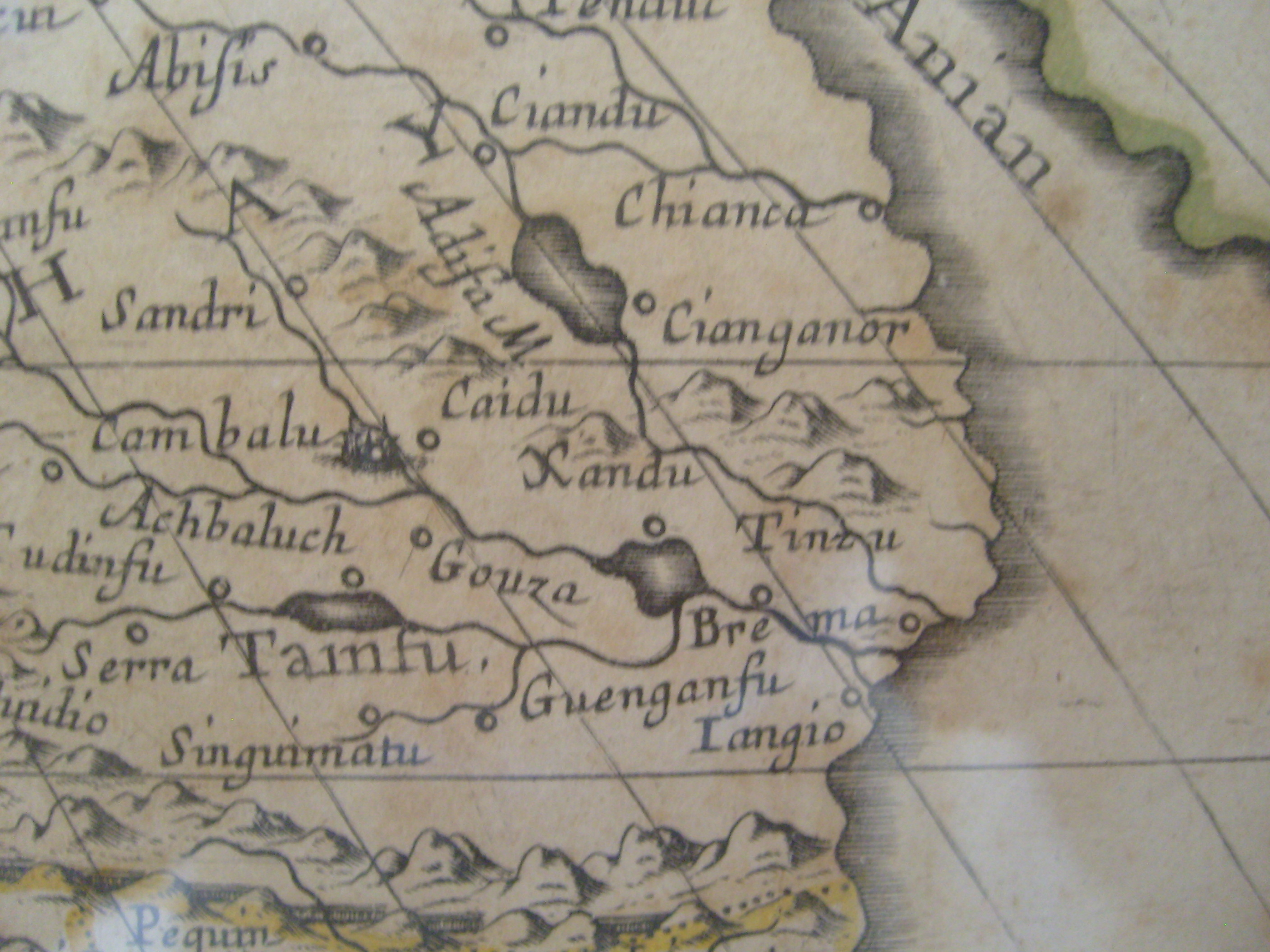
Xanadu (here called Ciandu, as Marco Polo called it) on the French map of Asia made by Sanson d'Abbeville, geographer of King Louis XIV, dated 1650. It was northwest of Xandu and northeast of Cambalu, or modern-day Beijing.

The book Coleridge was reading before he fell asleep was Purchas, his Pilgrimes, or Relations of the World and Religions Observed in All Ages and Places Discovered, from the Creation to the Present, by the English clergyman and geographer Samuel Purchas, published in 1613. The book contained a brief description of Xanadu, the summer capital of the Mongol ruler Kublai Khan. Coleridge's preface says that he was reading the following sentence, or words of the same substance, in Purchas's Pilgrimage:

Here the Khan Kubla commanded a palace to be built, and a stately garden thereunto. And thus ten miles of fertile ground were inclosed with a wall.

Coleridge names the wrong book by Purchas (Purchas wrote three books, his Pilgrimage, his Pilgrim, and his Pilgrimes; the last was his collection of travel stories), and misquotes the line. The text about Xanadu in Purchas, His Pilgrimes, which Coleridge admitted he did not remember exactly, was:

In Xandu did Cublai Can build a stately Pallace, encompassing sixteen miles of plaine ground with a wall, wherein are fertile Meddowes, pleasant Springs, delightfull streames, and all sorts of beasts of chase and game, and in the middest thereof a sumptuous house of pleasure, which may be moved from place to place.

This quotation was based upon the writings of the Venetian explorer Marco Polo who is widely believed to have visited Xanadu in about 1275. (Note: In about 1298–1299, Marco Polo dictated a description of Xanadu which includes these lines: And when you have ridden three days from the city last mentioned (Cambalu, or modern Beijing), between north-east and north, you come to a city called Chandu, which was built by the Khan now reigning. There is at this place a very fine marble Palace, the rooms of which are all gilt and painted with figures of men and beasts and birds, and with a variety of trees and flowers, all executed with such exquisite art that you regard them with delight and astonishment. Round this Palace a wall is built, inclosing a compass of 16 miles, and inside the Park there are fountains and rivers and brooks, and beautiful meadows, with all kinds of wild animals (excluding such as are of ferocious nature), which the Emperor has procured and placed there to supply food for his gerfalcons and hawks, which he keeps there in mew.) Marco Polo also described a large portable palace made of gilded and lacquered cane or bamboo which could be taken apart quickly and moved from place to place. (Note: Marco Polo described it this way: "Moreover at a spot in the Park where there is a charming wood he has another Palace built of cane, of which I must give you a description. It is gilt all over, and most elaborately finished inside. It is stayed on gilt and lackered columns, on each of which is a dragon all gilt, the tail of which is attached to the column whilst the head supports the architrave, and the claws likewise are stretched out right and left to support the architrave. The roof, like the rest, is formed of canes, covered with a varnish so strong and excellent that no amount of rain will rot them. These canes are a good 3 palms in girth, and from 10 to 15 paces in length. They are cut across at each knot, and then the pieces are split so as to form from each two hollow tiles, and with these the house is roofed; only every such tile of cane has to be nailed down to prevent the wind from lifting it. In short, the whole Palace is built of these canes, which (I may mention) serve also for a great variety of other useful purposes. The construction of the Palace is so devised that it can be taken down and put up again with great celerity; and it can all be taken to pieces and removed whithersoever the Emperor may command. When erected, it is braced against mishaps from the wind by more than 200 cords of silk. The Lord abides at this Park of his, dwelling sometimes in the Marble Palace and sometimes in the Cane Palace for three months of the year, to wit, June, July, and August; preferring this residence because it is by no means hot; in fact it is a very cool place. When the 28th day of the Moon of August arrives he takes his departure, and the Cane Palace is taken to pieces.") This was the "sumptuous house of pleasure" mentioned by Purchas, which Coleridge transformed into a "stately pleasure dome".

In terms of spelling, Coleridge's printed version differs from Purchas's spelling, which refers to the Mongol ruler as "Cublai Can", and from the spelling used by Milton, "Cathaian Can". His original manuscript spells the name "Cubla Khan" and the place "Xannadu".

=== Mount Abora ===
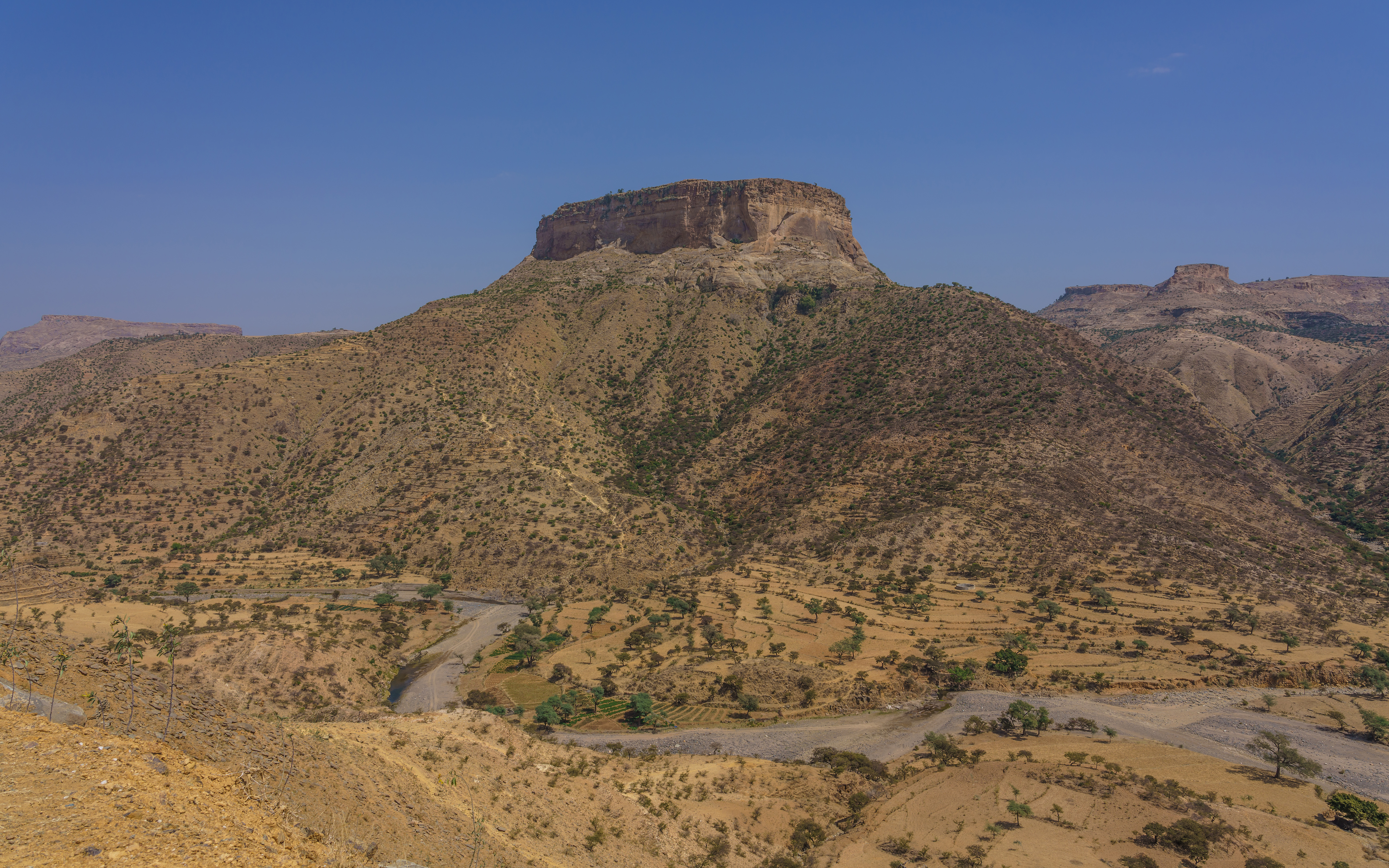
Debre Damo, an amba (flat-topped mountain) in Ethiopia similar to Amba Geshen (Mount Amara)

In the Crewe manuscript (the earlier unpublished version of the poem), the Abyssinian maid is singing of Mount Amara, rather than Abora. Mount Amara is a real mountain, today called Amba Geshen, located in the Amhara Region of modern Ethiopia, formerly known as the Abyssinian Empire. It was a natural fortress, and was the site of the royal treasury and the royal prison. The sons of the Emperors of Abyssinia, except for the heir, were held prisoner there, to prevent them from staging a coup against their father, until the Emperor's death.

Mount Amara was visited between 1515 and 1521 by Portuguese priest, explorer and diplomat Francisco Alvares (1465–1541), who was on a mission to meet the Christian king of Ethiopia. His description of Mount Amara was published in 1540, and appears in Purchas, his Pilgrimes, the book Coleridge was reading before he wrote Kubla Khan. (Note: Alvares wrote: The custome is that all the male child of the Kings, except the Heires, as soone as they be brought up, they send them presendly to a very great Rock, which stands in the province of Amara, and there they pass all their life, and never come out from thence, except the King which reignith departeth their life without Heires.) Mount Amara also appears in Milton's Paradise Lost, where it is "by some suppos'd / True Paradise under the Ethiop line," where Abyssinian kings keep their children guarded.

Mount Amara is in the same region as Lake Tana, the source of the Blue Nile river. Ethiopian tradition says that the Blue Nile is the River Gihon of the Bible, one of the four rivers that flow out of the Garden of Eden in the Book of Genesis, which says that Gihon flows through the Kingdom of Kush, the Biblical name for Ethiopia and Sudan. In fact the Blue Nile is very far from the other three rivers mentioned in Genesis 2:10–14, but this belief led to the connection in 18th and 19th century English literature between Mount Amara and Paradise.

=== Abyssinian maid ===
The Abyssinian maid is similar to the way Coleridge describes Lewti in another poem he wrote around the same time, Lewti. The connection between Lewti and the Abyssinian maid makes it possible that the maid was intended as a disguised version of Mary Evans, who appears as a love interest since Coleridge's 1794 poem The Sigh. Evans, in these poems, appears as an object of sexual desire and a source of inspiration. She is also similar to the later subject of many of Coleridge's poems, Asra, based on Sara Hutchinson.

Literary precedents for the Abyssinian maid include a description in Heliodorus's work Aethiopian History, with its description of "a young Lady, sitting upon a Rock, of so rare and perfect a Beauty, as one would have taken her for a Goddess, and though her present misery opprest her with extreamest grief, yet in the greatness of her afflection, they might easily perceive the greatness of her Courage: A Laurel crown'd her Head, and a Quiver in a Scarf hanged at her back". Her description in the poem is also related to Isis of Apuleius's Metamorphoses, and to John Keats's Indian woman in Endymion who is revealed to be the moon goddess.

=== Other sources ===
Charles Lamb provided Coleridge on 15 April 1797 with a copy of his "A Vision of Repentance", a poem that discussed a dream containing imagery similar to those in Kubla Khan. The poem could have provided Coleridge with the idea of a dream poem that discusses fountains, sacredness, and even a woman singing a sorrowful song.

There are additional strong literary connections to other works, including John Milton's Paradise Lost, Samuel Johnson's Rasselas, Chatterton's African Eclogues, William Bartram's Travels through North and South Carolina, (Note: In particular, Coleridge's descriptions of the sinuous rills, the scented trees, and the fountain (in fact a substantial upwelling) are close paraphrases of Bartram's description of a swamp location in one of the states he visited.) Thomas Burnet's Sacred Theory of the Earth, Mary Wollstonecraft's A Short Residence in Sweden, Plato's Phaedrus and Ion, Maurice's The History of Hindostan, and Heliodorus's Aethiopian History. The poem also contains allusions to the Book of Revelation in its description of New Jerusalem and to the paradise of William Shakespeare's A Midsummer Night's Dream. The sources used for Kubla Khan are also used in Coleridge's The Rime of the Ancient Mariner.

== Style ==
Kubla Khan

In Xanadu did Kubla Khan
A stately pleasure-dome decree:
Where Alph, the sacred river, ran
Through caverns measureless to man
Down to a sunless sea.
So twice five miles of fertile ground
With walls and towers were girdled round;
And there were gardens bright with sinuous rills,
Where blossom'd many an incense-bearing tree;
And here were forests ancient as the hills,
Enfolding sunny spots of greenery.

But oh that deep romantic chasm which slanted
Down the green hill athwart a cedarn cover!
A savage place! as holy and inchanted
As e'er beneath a waning moon was haunted
By woman wailing for her demon-lover!
And from this chasm, with ceaseless turmoil seething,
As if this earth in fast thick pants were breathing,
A mighty fountain momently was forced:
Amid whose swift half-intermitted burst
Huge fragments vaulted like rebounding hail,
Or chaffy grain beneath the thresher's flail:
And 'mid these dancing rocks at once and ever
It flung up momently the sacred river.
Five miles meandering with a mazy motion
Through wood and dale the sacred river ran,
Then reached the caverns measureless to man,
And sank in tumult to a lifeless ocean:
And 'mid this tumult Kubla heard from far
Ancestral voices prophesying war!

The shadow of the dome of pleasure
Floated midway on the waves;
Where was heard the mingled measure
From the fountain and the caves.
It was a miracle of rare device,
A sunny pleasure-dome with caves of ice!

A damsel with a dulcimer
In a vision once I saw:
It was an Abyssinian maid
And on her dulcimer she play'd,
Singing of Mount Abora.
Could I revive within me
Her symphony and song,
To such a deep delight 'twould win me,
That with music loud and long,
I would build that dome in air,
That sunny dome! those caves of ice!
And all who heard should see them there,
And all should cry, Beware! Beware!
His flashing eyes, his floating hair!
Weave a circle round him thrice,
And close your eyes with holy dread:
For he on honey-dew hath fed,
And drank the milk of Paradise.

=== Fragmentation ===
According to Coleridge's account, the poem is an incomplete fragment. Originally, he says, his dream included between 200 and 300 lines, but he was able to compose only the first 30 before he was interrupted. The second stanza is not necessarily part of the original dream and refers to the dream in the past tense. Kubla Khan is also related to the genre of fragmentary poetry, with internal images reinforcing the idea of fragmentation that is found within the form of the poem. The poem's self-proclaimed fragmentary nature combined with Coleridge's warning about the poem in the preface turns Kubla Khan into an "anti-poem", a work that lacks structure, order, and leaves the reader confused instead of enlightened. However, the poem has little relation to the other fragmentary poems Coleridge wrote.

The first lines of the poem follow iambic tetrameter with the initial stanza relying on heavy stresses. The lines of the second stanza incorporate lighter stresses to increase the speed of the meter to separate them from the hammer-like rhythm of the previous lines. There also is a strong break following line 36 in the poem that provides for a second stanza, and there is a transition in narration from a third person narration about Kubla Khan into the poet discussing his role as a poet. Without the Preface, the two stanzas form two different poems that have some relationship to each other but lack unity. This is not to say they would be two different poems, since the technique of having separate parts that respond to another is used in the genre of the odal hymn, as in the poetry of other Romantic poets including John Keats or Percy Bysshe Shelley. However, the odal hymn as used by others has a stronger unity among its parts, and Coleridge believed in writing poetry that was unified organically. It is possible that Coleridge was displeased by the lack of unity in the poem and added a note about the structure to the Preface to explain his thoughts.

=== Sound ===
The poem's language is highly stylised with a strong emphasis on sound devices that change between the poem's original two stanzas. The poem relies on many sound-based techniques, including cognate variation and chiasmus. In particular, the poem emphasises the use of the "æ" sound and similar modifications to the standard "a" sound to make the poem sound Asian. Its rhyme scheme found in the first seven lines is repeated in the first seven lines of the second stanza. There is a heavy use of assonance and alliteration, especially in the first line: "In Xanadu did Kubla Khan". The stressed sounds, "Xan", "du", "Ku", "Khan", contain assonance in their use of the sounds a-u-u-a, have two rhyming syllables with "Xan" and "Khan", and employ alliteration with the name Kubla Khan and the reuse of "d" sounds in "Xanadu" and "did". To pull the line together, the "i" sound of "In" is repeated in "did". Later lines do not contain the same amount of symmetry but do rely on assonance and rhymes throughout. Though the lines are interconnected, the rhyme scheme and line lengths are irregular.

== Major themes ==
=== Poetic imagination ===
One theory says that Kubla Khan is about poetry and the two sections discuss two types of poems. The power of the imagination is an important component to this theme. The poem celebrates creativity and how the poet is able to experience a connection to the universe through inspiration. As a poet, Coleridge places himself in an uncertain position as either master over his creative powers or a slave to it. The dome city represents the imagination and the second stanza represents the relationship between a poet and the rest of society. The poet is separated from the rest of humanity after he is exposed to the power to create and is able to witness visions of truth. This separation causes a combative relationship between the poet and the audience as the poet seeks to control his listener through a mesmerising technique. The poem's emphasis on imagination as subject of a poem, on the contrasts within the paradisal setting, and its discussion of the role of poet as either being blessed or cursed by imagination, has influenced many works, including Alfred Tennyson's "Palace of Art" and William Butler Yeats's Byzantium based poems. There is also a strong connection between the idea of retreating into the imagination found within Keats's Lamia and in Tennyson's "Palace of Art". The Preface, when added to the poem, connects the idea of the paradise as the imagination with the land of Porlock, and that the imagination, though infinite, would be interrupted by a "person on business". The Preface then allows for Coleridge to leave the poem as a fragment, which represents the inability for the imagination to provide complete images or truly reflect reality. The poem would not be about the act of creation but a fragmentary view revealing how the act works: how the poet crafts language and how it relates to himself.

Through use of the imagination, the poem is able to discuss issues surrounding tyranny, war, and contrasts that exist within paradise. Part of the war motif could be a metaphor for the poet in a competitive struggle with the reader to push his own vision and ideas upon his audience. As a component to the idea of imagination in the poem is the creative process by describing a world that is of the imagination and another that is of understanding. The poet, in Coleridge's system, is able to move from the world of understanding, where men normally are, and enter into the world of the imagination through poetry. When the narrator describes the "ancestral voices prophesying war", the idea is part of the world of understanding, or the real world. As a whole, the poem is connected to Coleridge's belief in a secondary Imagination that can lead a poet into a world of imagination, and the poem is both a description of that world and a description of how the poet enters the world. The imagination, as it appears in many of Coleridge's and Wordsworth's works, including Kubla Khan, is discussed through the metaphor of water, and the use of the river in Kubla Khan is connected to the use of the stream in Wordsworth's The Prelude. The water imagery is also related to the divine and nature, and the poet is able to tap into nature in a way Kubla Khan cannot harness its power.

=== The nature of paradise ===
Although the land is one of man-made "pleasure", there is a natural, "sacred" river that runs past it. The lines describing the river have a markedly different rhythm from the rest of the passage. The land is constructed as a garden, but like Eden after Man's fall, Xanadu is isolated by walls. The finite properties of the constructed walls of Xanadu are contrasted with the infinite properties of the natural caves through which the river runs. The poem expands on the gothic hints of the first stanza as the narrator explores the dark chasm in the midst of Xanadu's gardens, and describes the surrounding area as both "savage" and "holy". Yarlott interprets this chasm as symbolic of the poet struggling with decadence that ignores nature. It may also represent the dark side of the soul, the dehumanising effect of power and dominion. Fountains are often symbolic of the inception of life, and in this case may represent forceful creativity. Since this fountain ends in death, it may also simply represent the life span of a human, from violent birth to a sinking end. Yarlott argues that the war represents the penalty for seeking pleasure, or simply the confrontation of the present by the past. Though the exterior of Xanadu is presented in images of darkness, and in context of the dead sea, we are reminded of the "miracle" and "pleasure" of Kubla Khan's creation. The vision of the sites, including the dome, the cavern, and the fountain, are similar to an apocalyptic vision. Together, the natural and man-made structures form a miracle of nature as they represent the mixing of opposites together, the essence of creativity. In the third stanza, the narrator turns prophetic, referring to a vision of an unidentified "Abyssinian maid" who sings of "Mount Abora". Harold Bloom suggests that this passage reveals the narrator's desire to rival Khan's ability to create with his own. The woman may also refer to Mnemosyne, the Greek personification of memory and mother of the muses, referring directly to Coleridge's claimed struggle to compose this poem from memory of a dream. The subsequent passage refers to unnamed witnesses who may also hear this, and thereby share in the narrator's vision of a replicated, ethereal, Xanadu. Harold Bloom suggests that the power of the poetic imagination, stronger than nature or art, fills the narrator and grants him the ability to share this vision with others through his poetry. The narrator would thereby be elevated to an awesome, almost mythical status, as one who has experienced an Edenic paradise available only to those who have similarly mastered these creative powers.

In the tradition from which Coleridge drew, the Tatars ruled by Kubla Khan were depicted as uncivilized worshippers of the sun, connected to either the Cain or Ham line of outcasts. In the tradition Coleridge relies on, the Tatar worship the sun because it reminds them of paradise, and they build gardens because they want to recreate paradise. The Tatars are connected to the Judaeo Christian ideas of Original Sin and Eden: Kubla Khan is of the line of Cain and fallen, but he wants to overcome that state and rediscover paradise by creating an enclosed garden. The place was described in negative terms and seen as an inferior representation of paradise, and Coleridge's ethical system did not connect pleasure with joy or the divine. However, Coleridge describes Khan in a peaceful light and as a man of genius. He seeks to show his might but does so by building his own version of paradise. The description and the tradition provide a contrast between the daemonic and genius within the poem, and Khan is a ruler who is unable to recreate Eden.

The dome, as described in The History of Hindostan, was related to nature worship as it reflects the shape of the universe. Coleridge believed in a connection between nature and the divine but believed that the only dome that should serve as the top of a temple was the sky. He thought that a dome was an attempt to hide from the ideal and escape into a private creation, and Kubla Khan's dome is a flaw that keeps him from truly connecting to nature. Purchas's work does not mention a dome but a "house of pleasure". The use of dome instead of house or palace could represent the most artificial of constructs and reinforce the idea that the builder was separated from nature. However, Coleridge did believe that a dome could be positive if it was connected to religion, but the Khan's dome was one of immoral pleasure and a purposeless life dominated by sensuality and pleasure.

== Critical response ==
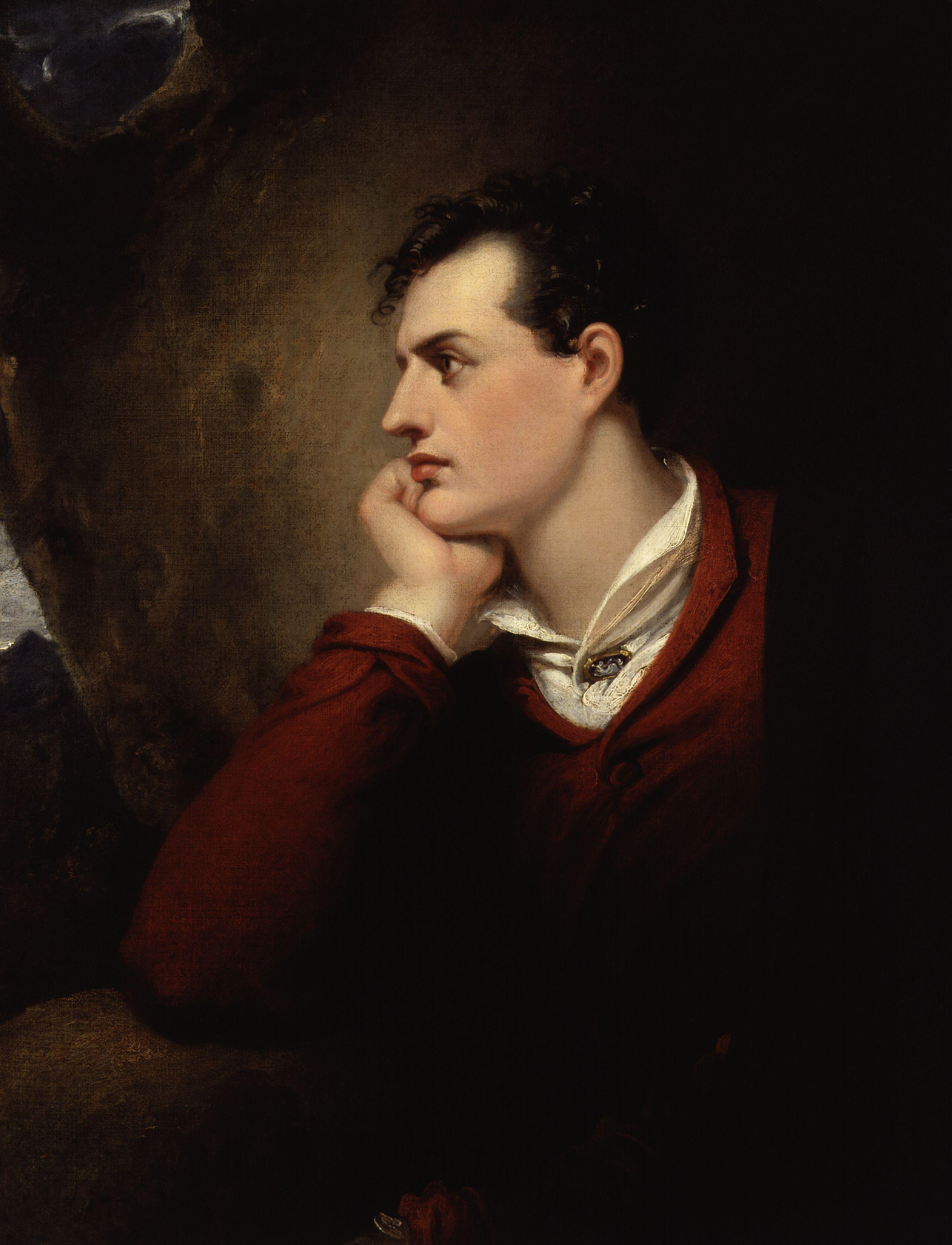
Lord Byron, second-generation Romantic poet who encouraged Coleridge's publication of Kubla Khan, by Richard Westall

The reception of Kubla Khan has changed substantially over time. Initial reactions to the poem were lukewarm, despite praise from notable figures like Lord Byron and Walter Scott. The work went through multiple editions, but the poem, as with his others published in 1816 and 1817, had poor sales. Initial reviewers saw some aesthetic appeal in the poem, but considered it unremarkable overall. As critics began to consider Coleridge's body of work as whole, however, Kubla Khan was increasingly singled out for praise. Positive evaluation of the poem in the 19th and early 20th centuries treated it as a purely aesthetic object, to be appreciated for its evocative sensory experience. Later criticism continued to appreciate the poem, but no longer considered it as transcending concrete meaning, instead interpreting it as a complex statement on poetry itself and the nature of individual genius.

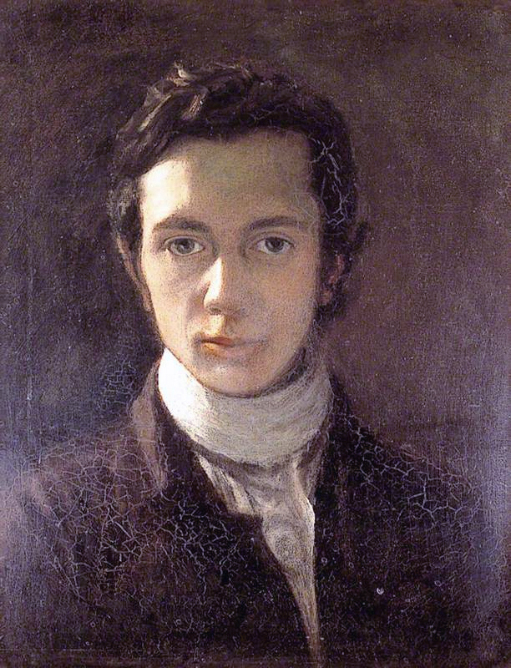
Self-portrait of William Hazlitt, Romantic critic who wrote the first negative review of Kubla Khan

=== During Coleridge's lifetime ===
Literary reviews at the time of the collection's first publication generally dismissed it. At the time of the poem's publication, a new generation of critical magazines, including Blackwood's Edinburgh Magazine, Edinburgh Review, and Quarterly Review, had been established, with critics who were more provocative than those of the previous generation. These critics were hostile to Coleridge due to a difference of political views, and due to a puff piece written by Byron about the Christabel publication. The first of the negative reviews was written by William Hazlitt, literary critic and Romantic writer, who criticized the fragmentary nature of the work. Hazlitt said that the poem "comes to no conclusion" and that "from an excess of capacity, [Coleridge] does little or nothing" with his material. The only positive quality which Hazlitt notes is a certain aesthetic appeal: he says "we could repeat these lines to ourselves not the less often for not knowing the meaning of them," revealing that "Mr Coleridge can write better nonsense verse than any man in English." As other reviews continued to be published in 1816, they, too, were lukewarm at best. The poem received limited praise for "some playful thoughts and fanciful imagery," and was said to "have much of the Oriental richness and harmony" but was generally considered unremarkable.

These early reviews generally accepted Coleridge's story of composing the poem in a dream, but dismissed its relevance, and observed that many others have had similar experiences. More than one review suggested that the dream had not merited publication. One reviewer questioned whether Coleridge had really dreamed his composition, suggesting that instead he likely wrote it rapidly upon waking.

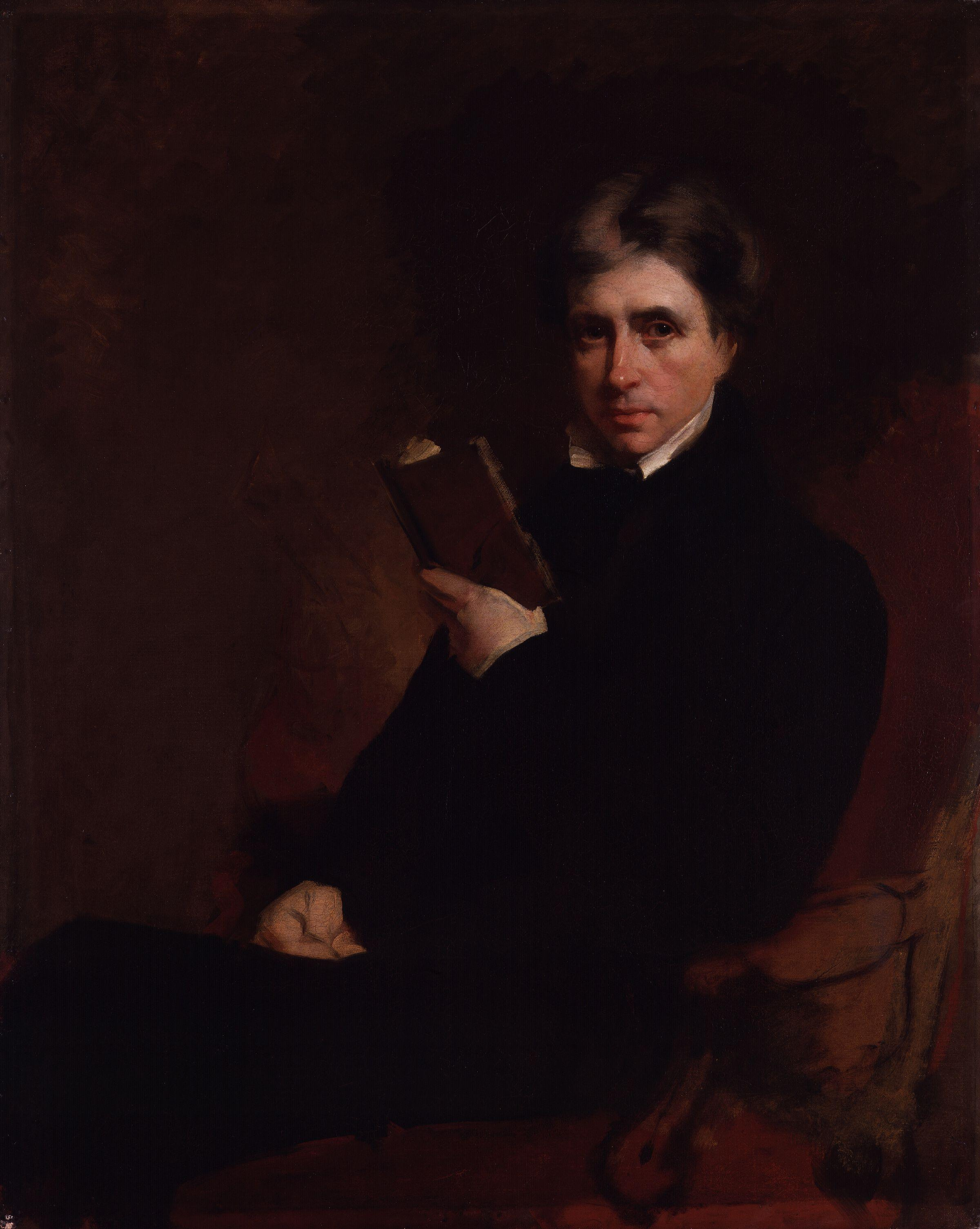
Leigh Hunt, second-generation Romantic poet who praised Kubla Khan

More positive appraisals of the poem began to emerge when Coleridge's contemporaries evaluated his body of work overall. In October 1821, Leigh Hunt singled out Kubla Khan as one of Coleridge's best works, praising the poem's evocative, dreamlike beauty. An 1830 review of Coleridge's Poetical Works similarly praised for its "melodious versification," describing it as "perfect music." An 1834 review, published shortly after Coleridge's death, also praised Kubla Khan's musicality. These three later assessments of Kubla Khan responded more positively to Coleridge's description of composing the poem in a dream, as an additional facet of the poetry.

=== Victorian period ===
Victorian critics praised the poem and some examined aspects of the poem's background. John Sheppard, in his analysis of dreams titled On Dreams (1847), lamented Coleridge's drug use as getting in the way of his poetry but argued: "It is probable, since he writes of having taken an 'anodyne,' that the 'vision in a dream' arose under some excitement of that same narcotic; but this does not destroy, even as to his particular case, the evidence for a wonderfully inventive action of the mind in sleep; for, whatever were the exciting cause, the fact remains the same". Hall Caine, in his 1883 survey of the original critical response to Christabel and Kubla Khan, praised the poem and declared: "It must surely be allowed that the adverse criticism on 'Christabel' and 'Kubla Khan' which is here quoted is outside all tolerant treatment, whether of raillery or of banter. It is difficult to attribute such false verdict to pure and absolute ignorance. Even when we make all due allowance for the prejudices of critics whose only possible enthusiasm went out to 'the pointed and fine propriety of Poe,' we can hardly believe that the exquisite art which is among the most valued on our possessions could encounter so much garrulous abuse without the criminal intervention of personal malignancy." In a review of H. D. Traill's analysis of Coleridge in the "English Men of Letters", an anonymous reviewer wrote in the 1885 Westminster Review: "Of 'Kubla Khan,' Mr. Traill writes: 'As to the wild dream-poem 'Kubla Khan,' it is hardly more than a psychological curiosity, and only that perhaps in respect of the completeness of its metrical form.' Lovers of poetry think otherwise, and listen to these wonderful lines as the voice of Poesy itself."

Critics at the end of the 19th century favoured the poem and placed it as one of Coleridge's best works. When discussing Christabel, Rime of the Ancient Mariner and Kubla Khan, an anonymous reviewer in the October 1893 The Church Quarterly Review wrote, "In these poems Coleridge achieves a mastery of language and rhythm which is nowhere else conspicuously evident in him." In 1895, Andrew Lang reviewed the Letters of Coleridge in addition to Coleridge's Kubla Khan, Christabel and Rime of the Ancient Mariner, saying: "all these poems are 'miraculous;' all seem to have been 'given' by the dreaming 'subconscious self' of Coleridge. The earliest pieces hold no promise of these marvels. They come from what is oldest in Coleridge's nature, his uninvited and irrepressible intuition, magical and rare, vivid beyond common sight of common things, sweet beyond sound of things heard." G E Woodberry, in 1897, said that Christabel, Rime of the Ancient Mariner, and Kubla Khan "are the marvelous creations of his genius. In these it will be said there is both a world of nature new created, and a dramatic method and interest. It is enough for the purpose of the analysis if it be granted that nowhere else in Coleridge's work, except in these and less noticeably in a few other instances, do these high characteristics occur." In speaking of the three poems, he stated they "have besides that wealth of beauty in detail, of fine diction, of liquid melody, of sentiment, thought, and image, which belong only to poetry of the highest order, and which are too obvious to require any comment. 'Kubla Khan' is a poem of the same kind, in which the mystical effect is given almost wholly by landscape."

=== 1920s–30s ===
The 1920s contained analysis of the poem that emphasised the poem's power. In Road to Xanadu (1927), a book length study of The Rime of the Ancient Mariner and Kubla Khan, John Livingston Lowes said that the poems were "two of the most remarkable poems in English". When turning to the background of the works, he argued, "Coleridge as Coleridge, be it said at once, is a secondary moment to our purpose; it is the significant process, not the man, which constitutes our theme. But the amazing modus operandi of his genius, in the fresh light which I hope I have to offer, becomes the very abstract and brief chronicle of the procedure of the creative faculty itself." After breaking down the various aspects of the poem, Lowes stated, "with a picture of unimpaired and thrilling vividness, the fragment ends. And with it ends, for all save Coleridge, the dream. 'The earth hath bubbles as the water has, and this is of them.' For 'Kubla Khan' is as near enchantment, I suppose, as we are like to come in this dull world. And over it is cast the glamour, enhanced beyond all reckoning in the dream, of the remote in time and space – that visionary presence of a vague and gorgeous and mysterious Past which brooded, as Coleridge read, above the inscrutable Nile, and domed pavilions in Cashmere, and the vanished stateliness of Xanadu." He continued by describing the power of the poem: "For none of the things which we have seen – dome, river, chasm, fountain, caves of ice, or floating hair – nor any combination of them holds the secret key to that sense of an incommunicable witchery which pervades the poem. That is something more impalpable by far, into which entered who can tell what traceless, shadowy recollections...The poem is steeped in the wonder of all Coleridge's enchanted voyagings." Lowes then concluded about the two works: "Not even in the magical four and fifty lines of 'Kubla Khan' is sheer visualizing energy so intensely exercised as in 'The Ancient Mariner.' But every crystal-clear picture there, is an integral part of a preconceived and consciously elaborated whole...In 'Kubla Khan' the linked and interweaving images irresponsibly and gloriously stream, like the pulsing, fluctuating banners of the North. And their pageant is as aimless as it is magnificent...There is, then...one glory of 'Kubla Khan' and another glory of 'The Ancient Mariner,' as one star differeth from another star in glory." George Watson, in 1966, stated that Lowes's analysis of the poems "will stand as a permanent monument to historical criticism." Also in 1966, Kenneth Burke, declared, "Count me among those who would view this poem both as a marvel, and as 'in principle' finished."

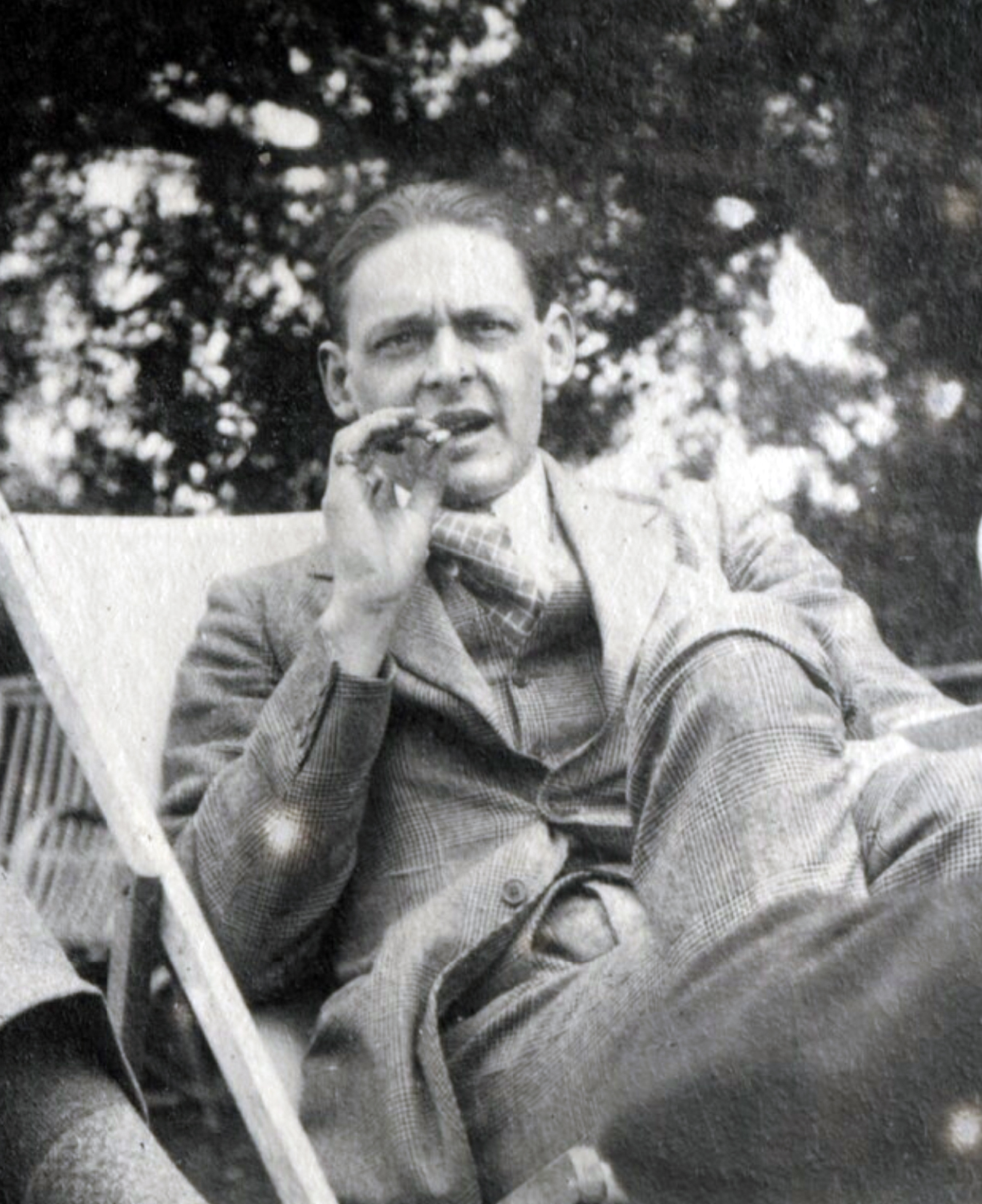
T. S. Eliot, poet and literary critic

T. S. Eliot attacked the reputation of Kubla Khan and sparked a dispute within literary criticism with his analysis of the poem in his essay "Origin and Uses of Poetry" from The Use of Poetry and the Use of Criticism (1933): "The way in which poetry is written is not, so far as our knowledge of these obscure matters as yet extends, any clue to its value...The faith in mystical inspiration is responsible for the exaggerated repute of 'Kubla Khan'. The imagery of that fragment, certainly, whatever its origins in Coleridge's reading, sank to the depths of Coleridge's feeling, was saturated, transformed there...and brought up into daylight again." He goes on to explain, "But it is not used: the poem has not been written. A single verse is not poetry unless it is a one-verse poem; and even the finest line draws its life from its context. Organization is necessary as well as 'inspiration'. The re-creation of word and image which happens fitfully in the poetry of such a poet as Coleridge happens almost incessantly with Shakespeare." Geoffrey Yarlott, in 1967, responds to Eliot to say, "Certainly, the enigmatic personages who appear in the poem...and the vaguely incantatory proper names...appear to adumbrate rather than crystalize the poet's intention. Yet, though generally speaking intentions in poetry are nothing save as 'realized', we are unable to ignore the poem, despite Mr Eliot's strictures on its 'exaggerated repute'." He continued, "We may question without end what it means, but few of us question if the poem is worth the trouble, or whether the meaning is worth the having. While the feeling persists that there is something there which is profoundly important, the challenge to elucidate it proves irresistible." However, Lilian Furst, in 1969, countered Yarlott to argue that, "T. S. Eliot's objection to the exaggerated repute of the surrealist Kubla Khan is not unjustified. Moreover, the customary criticism of Coleridge as a cerebral poet would seem to be borne out by those poems such as This Lime-tree Bower my Prison or The Pains of Sleep, which tend more towards a direct statement than an imaginative presentation of personal dilemma."

=== 1940s–60s ===
During the 1940s and 1950s, critics focused on the technique of the poem and how it relates to the meaning. In 1941, G. W. Knight wrote that Kubla Khan "needs no defence. It has a barbaric and oriental magnificence that asserts itself with a happy power and authenticity too often absent from visionary poems set within the Christian tradition." Humphrey House, in 1953, praised the poem and said of beginning of the poem: "The whole passage is full of life because the verse has both the needed energy and the needed control. The combination of energy and control in the rhythm and sound is so great" and that Coleridge's words "convey so fully the sense of inexhaustible energy, now falling now rising, but persisting through its own pulse". Also in 1953, Elisabeth Schneider dedicated her book to analysing the various aspects of the poem, including the various sound techniques. When discussing the quality of the poem, she wrote, "I sometimes think we overwork Coleridge's idea of 'the balance or reconciliation of opposite or discordant qualities.' I have to come back to it here, however, for the particular flavor of Kubla Khan, with its air of mystery, is describable in part through that convenient phrase. Yet, the 'reconciliation' does not quite occur either. It is in fact avoided. What we have instead is the very spirit of 'oscillation' itself." Continuing, she said, "The poem is the soul of ambivalence, oscillation's very self; and that is probably its deepest meaning. In creating this effect, form and matter are intricately woven. The irregular and inexact rhymes and varied lengths of the lines play some part. More important is the musical effect in which a smooth, rather swift forward movement is emphasized by the relation of grammatical structure to line and rhyme, yet is impeded and thrown back upon itself even from the beginning". She then concluded: "Here in these interwoven oscillations dwells the magic, the 'dream,' and the air of mysterious meaning of Kubla Khan. I question whether this effect was all deliberately through [sic?] out by Coleridge, though it might have been. It is possibly half-inherent in his subject...What remains is the spirit of 'oscillation,' perfectly poeticized, and possibly ironically commemorative of the author." Following in 1959, John Beer described the complex nature of the poem: "'Kubla Khan' the poem is not a meaningless reverie, but a poem so packed with meaning as to render detailed elucidation extremely difficult." In responding to House, Beer wrote, "That there is an image of energy in the fountain may be accepted: but I cannot agree that it is creative energy of the highest type."

Critics of the 1960s focused on the reputation of the poem and how it compared to Coleridge's other poems. In 1966, Virginia Radley considered Wordsworth and his sister as an important influence to Coleridge writing a great poem: "Almost daily social intercourse with this remarkable brother and sister seemed to provide the catalyst to greatness, for it is during this period that Coleridge conceived his greatest poems, 'Christabel,' 'The Rime of the Ancient Mariner,' and 'Kubla Khan,' poems so distinctive and so different from his others that many generations of readers know Coleridge solely through them." She latter added that "Of all the poems Coleridge wrote, three are beyond compare. These three, 'The Ancient Mariner,' 'Christabel,' and 'Kubla Khan,' produced an aura which defies definition, but which might be properly be called one of 'natural magic.'" What sets apart the poem from the others is its "verbal enactment of the creative process" which makes it "unique even among the three poems of high imagination." To Radley, "the poem is skilfully wrought, as are all the poems of high imagination. The opposites within it are diverse and effectively so. In tone, the poem juxtaposes quiet with noise...Action presents its contrasts also...These seemingly antithetical images combine to demonstrate the proximity of the known and the unknown worlds, the two worlds of Understanding and Imagination." In concluding about the poem, she argued, "In truth, there are other 'Fears in Solitude' than that written by Coleridge and there are other 'Frosts at Midnight'; but there are no other 'Ancient Mariners' or 'Kubla Khans,' nor are there likely to be. In evaluating Coleridge's poetry, it can readily be seen and accepted that for the poems of high imagination his reputation is eternally made."

In the same year as Radley, George Watson argued that "The case of 'Kubla Khan' is perhaps the strangest of all – a poem that stands high even in English poetry as a work of ordered perfection is offered by the poet himself, nearly twenty years after its composition, as a fragment. Anyone can accept that a writer's head should be full of projects he will never fulfil, and most writers are cautious enough not to set them down; Coleridge, rashly, did set them down, so that his very fertility has survived as evidence of infertility." He later argued that the poem "is probably the most original poem about poetry in English, and the first hint outside his notebooks and letters that a major critic lies hidden in the twenty-five-year-old Coleridge." In conclusion about the poem, Watson stated, "The triumph of 'Kubla Khan,' perhaps, lies in its evasions: it hints so delicately at critical truths while demonstrating them so boldly. The contrasts between the two halves of the poem...So bold, indeed, that Coleridge for once was able to dispense with any language out of the past. It was his own poem, a manifesto. To read it now, with the hindsight of another age, is to feel premonitions of the critical achievement to come...But the poem is in advance, not just of these, but in all probability of any critical statement that survives. It may be that it stands close to the moment of discovery itself." After responding to Eliot's claims about Kubla Khan, Yarlott, in 1967, argued that "few of us question if the poem is worth the trouble" before explaining that "The ambiguities inherent in the poem pose a special problem of critical approach. If we restrict ourselves to what is 'given', appealing to the poem as a 'whole', we shall fail probably to resolves its various cruxes. Hence, there is a temptation to look for 'external' influences ... The trouble with all these approaches is that they tend finally to lead away from the poem itself." When describing specifics, he argued, "The rhythmical development of the stanza, too, though technically brilliant, evokes admiration rather than delight. The unusually heavy stresses and abrupt masculine rhymes impose a slow and sonorous weightiness upon the movement of the iambic octosyllabics which is quite in contrast, say, to the light fast metre of the final stanza where speed of movement matches buoyancy of tone." Following in 1968, Walter Jackson Bate called the poem "haunting" and said that it was "so unlike anything else in English".

=== 1970s–present ===
Criticism during the 1970s and 1980s emphasised the importance of the Preface while praising the work. Norman Fruman, in 1971, argued: "To discuss 'Kubla Khan' as one might any other great poem would be an exercise in futility. For a century and a half its status has been unique, a masterpiece sui generis, embodying interpretive problems wholly its own...It would not be excessive to say that no small part of the extraordinary fame of 'Kubla Khan' inheres in its alleged marvellous conception. Its Preface is world-famous and has been used in many studies of the creative process as a signal instance in which a poem has come to us directly from the unconscious."

In 1981, Kathleen Wheeler contrasts the Crewe Manuscript note with the Preface: "Contrasting this relatively factual, literal, and dry account of the circumstances surrounding the birth of the poem with the actual published preface, one illustrates what the latter is not: it is not a literal, dry, factual account of this sort, but a highly literary piece of composition, providing the verse with a certain mystique." In 1985, David Jasper praised the poem as "one of his greatest meditations on the nature of poetry and poetic creation" and argued "it is through irony, also, as it unsettles and undercuts, that the fragment becomes a Romantic literary form of such importance, nowhere more so than in 'Kubla Khan'." When talking about the Preface, Jasper asserted that it "profoundly influenced the way in which the poem has been understood". Responding in part to Wheeler in 1986, Charles Rzepka analysed the relationship between the poet and the audience of the poem while describing Kubla Khan as one of "Coleridge's three great poems of the supernatural". He continued by discussing the preface: "despite its obvious undependability as a guide to the actual process of the poem's composition, the preface can still, in Wheeler's words, lead us 'to ponder why Coleridge chose to write a preface...' What the preface describes, of course, is not the actual process by which the poem came into being, but an analogue of poetic creation as logos, a divine 'decree' or fiat which transforms the Word into the world."

During the 1990s, critics continued to praise the poem with many critics placing emphasis on what the Preface adds to the poem. David Perkins, in 1990, argued that "Coleridge's introductory note to Kubla Khan weaves together two myths with potent imaginative appeal. The myth of the lost poem tells how an inspired work was mysteriously given to the poet and dispelled irrecoverably." Also in 1990, Thomas McFarland stated, "Judging by the number and variety of critical effort to interpret their meaning, there may be no more palpably symbolic poems in all of English literature than Kubla Khan and The Ancient Mariner." In 1996, Rosemary Ashton stated that the poem was "one of the most famous poems in the language" and claimed the Preface as "the most famous, but probably not the most accurate, preface in literary history." Richard Holmes, in 1998, declared the importance of the poem's Preface while describing the reception of the 1816 volume of poems: "However, no contemporary critic saw the larger possible significance of Coleridge's Preface to 'Kubla Khan', though it eventually became one of the most celebrated, and disputed, accounts of poetic composition ever written. Like the letter from the fictional 'friend' in the Biographia, it brilliantly suggests how a compressed fragment came to represent a much larger (and even more mysterious) act of creation".

In 2002, J. C. C. Mays pointed out that "Coleridge's claim to be a great poet lies in the continued pursuit of the consequences of 'The Ancient Mariner,' 'Christabel' and 'Kubla Khan' on several levels." Adam Sisman, in 2006, questioned the nature of the poem itself: "No one even knows whether it is complete; Coleridge describes it as a 'fragment,' but there is a case for doubting this. Maybe it is not a poem at all. Hazlitt called it 'a musical composition'...Though literary detectives have uncovered some of its sources, it remains difficult to say what the poem is about." In describing the merits of the poem and its fragmentary state, he said, "The poem stands for itself: beautiful, sensuous and enigmatic." During the same year, Jack Stillinger wrote that "Coleridge wrote only a few poems of the first rank – perhaps no more than a dozen, all told – and he seems to have taken a very casual attitude toward them...he kept 'Kubla Khan' in manuscript for nearly twenty years before offering it to the public 'rather as a psychological curiosity, than on the grounds of any supposed poetic merits'". Harold Bloom, in 2010, argued that Coleridge wrote two kinds of poems and that "The daemonic group, necessarily more famous, is the triad of The Ancient Mariner, Christabel, and 'Kubla Khan.'" He goes on to explain the "daemonic": "Opium was the avenging daemon or alastor of Coleridge's life, his dark or fallen angel, his experiential acquaintance with Milton's Satan. Opium was for him what wandering and moral tale-telling became for the Mariner – the personal shape of repetition compulsion. The lust for paradise in 'Kubla Khan,' Geraldine's lust for Christabel – these are manifestations of Coleridge's revisionary daemonization of Milton, these are Coleridge's countersublime. Poetic genius, the genial spirit itself, Coleridge must see as daemonic when it is his own rather than when it is Milton's."

== Musical settings ==
Settings of this extended poem began in the UK with Samuel Coleridge-Taylor's "Kubla Khan, a rhapsody" for mezzo soprano, chorus and orchestra (Opus 61, 1905). It was followed in 1912 by Granville Bantock's setting for male chorus (later adapted for brass band performance) and by Cecil Forsyth's a capella choral setting of 1913. In 1940 Alan Rawsthorne's orchestral setting for alto and tenor soloists and chorus was destroyed in a bombing raid shortly after its performance but was later re-edited in a 25-minute new orchestration together with Edward Harper. An orchestral setting for baritone and chorus by John Veale followed in 1956, and another by Bernard Naylor, "Kubla Khan or A Vision in a Dream", for two sopranos, female chorus and piano in 1963. Humphrey Searle's twelve tone setting for tenor, chorus and orchestra was composed in 1974 and performed by the University Choir at Santa Barbara in 1977, but by this time the musical style was no longer well regarded.

US composers were responsible for other musical treatments of the poem as well, beginning with Charles Tomlinson Griffes, whose orchestral tone poem of 1912 was revised in 1916. It was first performed by the Boston Symphony Orchestra in 1919 under the title "The pleasure-dome of Kubla Khan".George Frederick McKay's Kubla Khan for soprano soloist, flute, violin, violoncello, contrabass, piano, and 2 percussion was posthumously published in 1979. In the new century, a setting by Katherine Saxon (b. 1991) for a capella chamber choir received Honorable Mention in the American Prize Choral Professional Division for 2015.

European composers have also been drawn to the poem. In 1989 it was set in France for soprano and clarinet under the title Xanadu by Philippe Manoury. And no less than three composers of Russian origin combined to set it as a five-part song cycle: Dmitri Smirnov (sections 1, 3); Elena Firsova (2, 4) and her daughter Alissa Firsova (5). The work was given its first performance in Hannover in 2011.

In addition, there have been a number of references to the building of a pleasure dome in the international rock scene. They occur in Canadian rock band Rush's 1977 song "Xanadu"; in the British band Frankie Goes to Hollywood's 1984 song "Welcome to the Pleasuredome"; in German band Blind Guardian's 2015 song "Sacred Mind" and in psychedelic prog-rock opera "Kubla Khan" by Koroletski in 2026.
