= The Western Canon =

1994 book by Harold Bloom

The Western Canon: The Books and School of the Ages
- Cover of the first edition
- Author: Harold Bloom
- Language: English
- Subject: Western canon
- Publisher: Harcourt Brace
- Publication date: 1994
- Publication place: United States
- Media type: Print (Hardcover and Paperback)
- Pages: 578
- ISBN: 978-1-57322-514-4

The Western Canon: The Books and School of the Ages is a 1994 book about Western literature by the American literary critic Harold Bloom, in which the author defends the concept of the Western canon by discussing 26 writers whom he sees as central to the canon.

== Summary ==
Bloom argues against what he calls the "school of resentment", which includes feminist literary criticism, Marxist literary criticism, Lacanians, New Historicism, Deconstructionists, and semioticians. The Western Canon includes four appendices listing works that Bloom at the time considered canonical, stretching from the earliest scriptures to Tony Kushner's Angels in America. Bloom later disowned the list, saying that it was written at his editor's insistence and distracted from the book's intention.

Bloom defends the concept of the Western canon by discussing 26 writers whom he sees as central to the canon:

1. William Shakespeare
2. Dante Alighieri
3. Geoffrey Chaucer
4. Miguel de Cervantes
5. Michel de Montaigne
6. Molière
7. John Milton
8. Samuel Johnson
9. Johann Wolfgang von Goethe
10. William Wordsworth
11. Jane Austen
12. Walt Whitman
13. Emily Dickinson
14. Charles Dickens
15. George Eliot
16. Leo Tolstoy
17. Henrik Ibsen
18. Sigmund Freud
19. Marcel Proust
20. James Joyce
21. Virginia Woolf
22. Franz Kafka
23. Jorge Luis Borges
24. Pablo Neruda
25. Fernando Pessoa
26. Samuel Beckett

== Reception ==
Norman Fruman of The New York Times wrote that "The Western Canon is a heroically brave, formidably learned and often unbearably sad response to the present state of the humanities."

The novelist A. S. Byatt wrote:

Bloom's canon is in many ways mine. It consists of those writers all other writers have to know and by whom they measure themselves. A culture's canon is an evolving consensus of individual canons. Canonical writers changed the medium, the language they were working in. People who merely describe what is happening now don't last. Mine includes writers I don't necessarily like. D. H. Lawrence, though I hate him in a way, Jane Austen, too.

Piotr Wilczek and Adam Czerniawski criticized Bloom's narrow interpretation of the concept of the West, significantly underrepresenting and even ignoring works from countries he was not familiar with, such as Poland. They interpret his list as dominated by British and American culture, with a small dose of ancient Western classics and a few non-English works from other Western European countries. At the same time, they concur that such a group is pretty standard for the Western canon as understood by most Western European scholars.

== School of resentment ==
"School of resentment" is a term coined by Bloom and expounded upon in his work. It is used to describe related schools of literary criticism that have gained prominence in academia since the 1970s and which Bloom contended are preoccupied with political and social activism at the expense of aesthetic values. Broadly, what Bloom termed "schools of resentment" approaches associate with Marxist critical theory, including African-American studies, Marxist literary criticism, New Historicist criticism, feminist criticism and post-structuralism—specifically as promoted by Jacques Lacan, Jacques Derrida and Michel Foucault. The "school of resentment" is usually defined as comprising all scholars who wish to enlarge the Western Canon by adding to it more works by authors from minority groups without regard to aesthetic merit or influence over time, or those who argue that some works commonly thought canonical promote sexist, racist or otherwise biased values and should therefore be removed from the canon. Bloom contended that the school of resentment threatens the nature of the canon itself and may lead to its eventual demise.

Literary theorist Manfred Pfister agreed that Bloom is at least partly accurate in his description of the "school of resentment", writing that those identified by Bloom do in fact routinely use "subversive, oppositional discourse" to attack the canon specifically and Western culture in general. Yet "this school deserves to be taken seriously—more seriously than Bloom's trivialization of it as mere resentment."

== See also ==
- Ressentiment
