= Lines on an Autumnal Evening =

Poem written by Samuel Taylor Coleridge

Lines on an Autumnal Evening is a poem composed by Samuel Taylor Coleridge in 1793. The poem, rewritten throughout Coleridge's life, discusses nature and love. As Coleridge developed and aged, the object of the poem changed to be various women that Coleridge had feelings toward.

== Background ==
The poem, originally called Absence: A Poem describes Coleridge's moving to Ottery in August 1793 but claimed later in life that it dated back to 1792. The poem was addressed to a girl he met during June, Fanny Nesbitt, and is connected to two other poems dedicated to her: "On Presenting a Moss Rose to Miss F. Nesbitt" and "Cupid Turn'd Chymist". The poem was later published in a Dorset newspaper. An early draft of Lines: On an Autumnal Evening was titled An Effusion at Evening, Written in August 1793. Effusion was dedicated to Mary Evans and expressed his feelings for her. After he married Sara Fricker, Coleridge revised the poem to match his new relationship.

The poem was rewritten many times, and other titles of the later versions include "Effusion", Written in Early Youth, The Time, An Autumnal Evening, and An Effusion on an Autumnal Evening. Written in Early Youth. The poem was included in Coleridge's 1796 collection with publications following in 1797, 1803, 1828, 1829, and 1834. It is documented that, on 7 November 1793, Coleridge read the poem to his friends from college. Of those hearing the poem was Christopher Wordsworth, William Wordsworth's younger brother, that later described Coleridge's poem "sickly diction".

Coleridge was accused of taking from Samuel Roger's "The Pleasures of Memory". In notes included to the 1796 edition of Coleridge's poems, line 57 has written:

I entreat the Public's pardon for having carelessly suffered to be printed such intolerable stuff as this and the thirteen following lines. They have not the merit even of originality: as every thought is to be found in the Greek Epigrams. The lines in this poem from the 27th to the 36th, I have been told are a palpable imitation of the passage from the 355th to the 370th line of the Pleasures of Memory Part 3. I do not perceive so striking a similarity between the two passages; at all events I had written the Effusion several years before I had seen Mr Rogers' Poem.

Rogers's work was published in 1792, the year before, and it is possible that Coleridge concealed the original date of creating his poem. However, it is uncertain when Coleridge actually read Rogers's poem. According to the later critic Norman Fruman, "This would make the striking similarities of thought and phrase, however improbably, mere coincidence." Lucy Newlyn claims that "it would seem possible that the public acknowledgement of Wordsworth is there partly because it conceals the debt to Rogers" in Lines Written at Shurton Bars.

== Poems ==
The poem opens with the narrator admonishing personified Fancy:

O thou wild Fancy, check thy wing! No more
Those thin white flakes, those purple clouds explore!

— lines 1–2

And the narrator then asks for her to serve a purpose inspiring him by making the land beautiful:

Now sheds the sinking Sun a deeper gleam,
Aid, lovely Sorceress! aid thy Poet's dream!

— lines 13–14

The narrator continues by seeking inspiration that he once had. The next passage describes an event that possibly happened between Coleridge and Evans or aspects of their relationship:

As erst when from the Muses' calm abode
I came, with Learning's meed not unbestowed;
When as she twin'd a laurel round my brow,
And met my kiss, and half return'd my vow,
O'er all my frame shot rapid my thrill'd heart,
And every nerve confess'd the electric dart.

— lines 17–22

Soon after, there is an emphasis within the poem on the voice of the woman that he desires. This voice contains pity, which is a sign of caring:

With her along the streamlet's brink I rove;
With her I list the warblings of the grove;
And seems in each low wind her voice to float
Lone-whispering Pity in each soothing note!

— lines 33–36

The narrator soon wishes that he could become one with the landscape:

O (have I sigh'd) were mine the wizard's rod,
Or mine the power of Proteus, changeful God!
A flower-entangled Arbour I would seem
To shield my Love from Noontide's sultry beam:
Or bloom a Myrtle, from whose od'rous boughs
My Love might weave gay garlands for her brows.
When Twilight stole across the fading vale,
To fan my Love I'd be the Evening Gale;
Mourn in the soft folds of her swelling vest,
And flutter my faint pinions on her breast!

— lines 57–66

The poem concludes with night overcoming the world:

Scenes of my Hope! the aching eye ye leave
Like yon bright hues that paint the clouds of eve!
Tearful and saddening with the sadden'd blaze
Mine eye the gleam pursues with wistful gaze:
Sees shades on shades with deeper tint impend,
Till chill and damp the moonless night descend.

— lines 101–106

== Themes ==
Lines is characterised by the use of traditional images of nature, archaic language, and personification. The poem opens with the word "Fancy", but the original word was "Imagination". During Coleridge's early writing, he alternates between the words and does not seem to distinguish between them. According to Virginia Radley, "At this point, he may have begun to evolve his famous distinction between the two terms, although there is no way of proving this." There is also a connection between nature and inspiration, a theme later picked up in Percy Shelley's poetry. However, nature's inspiration does not last and nature only acts passively when it comes to inspiring. These themes connect the poem to Coleridge's later poem "The Eolian Harp", especially in its use of time and evening. There is also a connection to the ideas of Wordsworth's An Evening Walk and Collins's "Ode to Evening" in the replacement of nature with imagination.

The narrator is interested in nature not for nature but for his connection to a woman during a previous time. The image of the woman within the poem combines with the image of Fancy, and the narrator focuses on trying to recreate the time that he was with the woman. The woman is a source of pity, which is commonly a means for women to express caring within Coleridge's poetry. To be closer to that pity, the narrator wishes to become part of nature. Although they would be intimate, their relationship would be unconsummated. The effort to think about the woman causes the narrator to become tired, and the darkness represents a realistic and symbolic closing of the poem.

== Critical response ==
Radley argues that "this poetry, as poetry, is certainly inferior to that which distinguishes the poetry of the 'Major Minor Poems,' though in many respects it is on a par with that comprising the Juvenalia. Such overworked cliches [...] combine with the other characteristics cited to make the poem reminiscent of another age, yet meretriciously so." Later, Hendrik Rookmaaker points out that "It is remarkable that in this poem the visions of the poet are not only unrelated to the scenery surrounding him, but are in fact incompatible with it (sunset versus 'gleam of dawn' and 'moon-beams'). About a year later he condemns this lack of harmony between vision and nature, inner and outer."
