= Crewe manuscript =

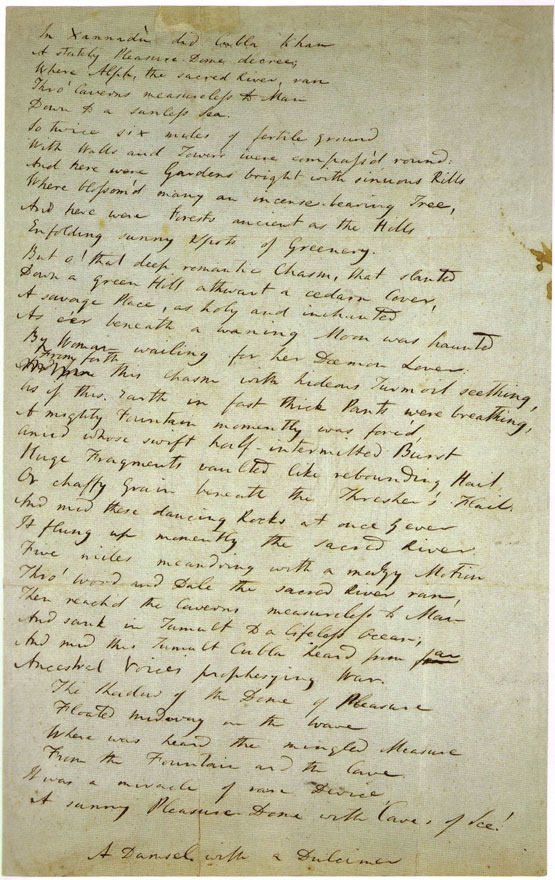
The Crewe manuscript, handwritten by Samuel Taylor Coleridge some time before the poem was published in 1816

The Crewe manuscript is the only manuscript copy of Samuel Taylor Coleridge's poem Kubla Khan. It is a holograph manuscript (i.e., written in Coleridge's own hand), from some time between the poem's composition in 1797 and its publication in 1816. It presumed not to be the first draft of the poem, but rather a "fair copy" written out legibly for publication, though it has some minor differences from the final published poem.

In 1934, a copy of the poem written by Coleridge himself sometime before its publication in 1816 was discovered in a private library. The so-called Crewe Manuscript was sent by Coleridge to his sister-in-law Mrs. Southey, who later gave it or sold it to a private autograph collector. It was auctioned in 1859 and purchased by another autograph collector for the price of one pound fifteen pence. It passed to the Marquess of Crewe, who donated it in 1962 to the British Museum. It is now on display at the British Library.

The Crewe Manuscript has a number of small changes, and three notable differences, from the final version published in 1816. The three biggest differences between the versions are:

- Coleridge changed the size and description of the garden, from "twice six miles... compass'd round" in the manuscript to "twice five miles.... girdled round" in the publication.
- Line 17 changed its description of the chasm, from "From forth this chasm with hideous Turmoil seething" to "And from this chasm, with ceaseless turmoil seething."
- Most significantly, the "Abyssynian maid" was changed from singing of "Mount Amara" in the manuscript to "Mount Abora" in the published version. Mount Amara is a real place, notably mentioned in Paradise Lost by John Milton, whereas Mount Abora was purely imaginary, evidently chosen simply for the beauty of its sound.
