= The Destruction of the Bastile =

Poem by Samuel Taylor Coleridge

"The Destruction of the Bastile" was composed by Samuel Taylor Coleridge in 1789. The poem describes Coleridge's feelings of hopes for the French Revolution as a catalyst for political change.

== Background ==
When the Bastille was overrun during the French Revolution and destroyed in July 1789, many political liberals within Britain celebrated. The schoolboy Coleridge, in particular, leaned towards radical views and would later become more and more radical although his views within "The Destruction of the Bastile" are more moderate. Although the poem was composed following the Bastille's destruction, it was not published until 1834.

== Poem ==
The poem follows the conventional pattern of the Whig progress poem, and the narrator begins by praising France's ability to break free of tyranny:

What tho' through many a groaning age
Was felt thy keen suspicious rage,
Yet Freedom rous'd by fierce Disdain
Has wildly broke thy triple chain,
And like the storm which Earth's deep entrails hide,
At length has burst its way and spread the ruins wide.

— lines 5–10

After the first stanza, the second and third stanza are missing, as the manuscript they were copied from were lacking those pages. When it resumes at stanza 4, the poem capture's Coleridge's feelings of hope about what the revolution could bring:

I see, I see! glad Liberty succeed
With every patriot virtue in her train!
And mark yon peasant's raptur’d eyes;
Secure he views his harvests rise;
No fetter vile the mind shall know,
And Eloquence shall fearless glow.
Yes! Liberty the soul of Life shall reign,
Shall throb in every pulse, shall flow thro' every vein!

— lines 23-30

The narrator then asks the Prime Minister of Great Britain to help Belgium break free of Austrian control, and the poem ends with an emphasis on Britain having already experienced a revolution centuries before:

And still, as erst, let favour'd Britain be
First ever of the first and freest of the free!

— lines 39-40

== Themes ==
Coleridge focused on political abstractions within the poem and emphasizes the freedom that would result from the French Revolution. Instead of wishing for a similar revolution to happen across Britain, the poem assumes that the British parliament is the result of a similar revolution happening years earlier. There is also an apocalyptic element combined with the poem's description of the Bastille's destruction. It is nature that has caused the violence in France, and it is humanity and society that are actually transforming during the event.

Coleridge's view of history and political revolutions was influenced by Voltair's Philosophical Dictionary and the Cato's Letters, and his idea of celebrating the French Revolution was common until 1793 when France declared war on Britain. Also, the ideas found within the poem are not unique within his poetry, and the revolution would appear again in his "Ode to France".

== Critical response ==
During the mid 20th-century, John Colmer argued that the poem "has little or no poetic merit. It was probably in origin an academic exercise and its rhetorical excesses make it difficult to be certain how much genuine emotion that event aroused in the boy Coleridge." This was followed by Samuel Chew and Richard Altick declaring: "[Coleridge's] addiction to 'turgid ode and tumid stanza,' clogged with pompous rhetoric and frigid personification, is evident in the Destruction of the Bastille (1789)".

However, David Aers, Jonathan Cook, and David Punter argued that "The poem displays some features which are worth noticing because they are not merely the product of youthful incompetence in the use of eighteenth-century modes of personification [...] Coleridge combines this use of abstractions with conventional apocalyptic analogies in which violent political events are seen in terms of violent natural phenomena." Following this, Grevel Lindop believes that "Coleridge was already a dedicated poet With such ambitious juvenilia as 'The Destruction of the Bastille' and 'Monody on the Death of Chatterton' behind him".
