= Easter Holidays =

Poem by Samuel Taylor Coleridge (1787)

"Easter Holidays" is a poem by Samuel Taylor Coleridge, which he wrote at age fifteen in 1787. It is one of his earliest known poems and was included in a letter to his brother Luke. The poem describes the joy of Easter but also warns of possible future sorrows after one loses his innocence. The poem concludes with a Neoplatonic emphasis of virtue being able to conquer suffering.

== Background ==
"Easter Holidays", along with "Dura Navis" and "Nil Pejus est Caelibe Vita", is one of Coleridge's earliest known poems. The poem was written in 1787 while Coleridge attended Christ's Hospital, London. During his school days, he was a lonely child and was unable to spend holidays with family like other boys at the school. This loneliness was broken with the arrival of his brothers George and Luke in 1785, but returned when Luke moved to Devon. In a letter to Luke on 12 May 1787, he expressed his feelings of loneliness. Included in the letter was his poem, "Easter Holidays", which seeks to celebrate Easter. This was the first time Coleridge included a poem with one of his letters.

== Poem ==
Coleridge begins his poem with a standard invocation of the muse:

Hail! festal Easter that dost bring
Approach of sweetly-smiling spring,
When Nature's clad in green:

— lines 1–3

The poem then describes the festivities of Easter and the joy that comes with it:

All sing the festive lay.

With mirthful dance they beat the ground,
Their shouts of joy the hills resound
And catch the jocund noise:

— lines 12–15

This transitions into a comparison between present happiness and future pain:

Without a tear, without a sigh
Their moments all in transports fly
Till evening ends their joys.

But little think their joyous hearts
Of dire Misfortune's varied smarts
Which youthful years conceal:
Thoughtless of bitter-smiling Woe
Which all mankind are born to know
And they themselves must feel.

— lines 16–24

The suffering comes from the youths' fall from innocence, but their innocence is also what kept them from knowing that they will suffer. However, the poem ends with a message of hope:

While steady Virtue guides his mind
Heav'n–born Content he still shall find
That never sheds a tear:
Without respect to any tide
His hours away in bliss shall glide
Like Easter all the year.

— lines 31–36

== Themes ==
The themes of the poem were influenced by John Trenchard and Thomas Gordon who wrote the Cato's Letters, a series of letters on religion, sin, and suffering under the pseudonym Cato. They promoted the belief that suffering originated in vice, and that man is ever subject to passions that cannot be controlled. This is connected to Coleridge experiencing both suffering and guilt over what he described later as his loss of innocence. In "Easter Holidays", Coleridge describes the time of innocence as in the past although others that he attends school with are still joyful and innocent.

However, discussion of beauty within "Easter Holiday", along with the hopeful conclusion of the poem, reveals a further influence by Neoplatonistic works, especially Plotinus's Enneads. Of Plotinus in particular, Coleridge derived his understanding of wisdom as the soul being awakened to the knowledge of God and truth. As such, Coleridge responds to the ideas of Trenchard and Gordon with a view that those who are virtuous are unaffected by suffering. Instead, only those who are vicious in nature really suffer and that people are able to conquer their fallen state.

== Sources ==
The work is traditional and hearkens back to classical poetry. Coleridge studied Horace at Christ's Hospital, and his 13th line shows this influence: "With mirthful dance they beat the ground". This influence was common to his other earlier works. Use of the invocation "Hail!" was common during the 18th century and is connected to the epic tradition. Its predominant purpose was to address divinity of some form. His sources, including Plotinus and the Cato's Letters, originate in his studying metaphysics while attending Christ's Hospital.
