= Pain: Composed in Sickness =

Poem written by Samuel Taylor Coleridge

"Pain: Composed in Sickness" is a poem by Samuel Taylor Coleridge. The poem marks a time in Coleridge's life in which he began to take opium.

== Background ==
Coleridge attended the school Christ's Hospital, and he was often at the sanatorium for illness while there. The poems "Pain", "A Few Lines" and "Genevieve" were written during his final year, but he experienced various illnesses during his stay that were the result of either chronic illness or illnesses resulting from his own actions, including swimming across the New River which resulted in rheumatic fever. To combat the many fevers, Coleridge was treated with laudanum, or opium, during this time. From his schooldays onward, opium use would be a constant throughout his life. Of the three poems, "Pain" was printed in the 1834 collection of Coleridge's poems and "Genevieve" was printed in many of Coleridge's collections throughout his life. "A Few Lines" was included with copies of "Pain" and "Nemo Repente Turpissimus" sent to Coleridge's brother George.

== Poems ==
=== Pain or Sonnet: Composed in Sickness ===
"Pain" is a conventional sonnet that emphasises how pain is able to remove the pleasure from life:

And seas of Pain seem waving through each limb—
Ah what can all Life's gilded scenes avail?
I view the crowd, whom Youth and Health inspire,
Hear the loud laugh, and catch the sportive lay,
Then sigh and think—I too could laugh and play
And gaily sport it on the Muse's lyre,
Ere Tyrant Pain had chas'd away delight,

— lines 7–13

=== A Few Lines Written by Lee When Mad ===
"A Few Lines" is Coleridge's rewriting of a portion of William Woty's play The Country Gentleman. The lines are supposedly what Nathaniel Lee would write during a fit of madness, and parallel many themes within the "Pain" sonnet:

O! that my mouth could bleat, like butter'd peas,
Engendrin windmills in the Northern seas—
Coaches and Waggons rumble down my Nose,
Whilst green iniquity flows off in prose:
Then run full tilt against the Subjunctive mood,
And fatten padlocks on Antarctic food.

— lines 1-6

=== Sonnet: Genevieve ===
The poem is connected to Jenny Edwards, daughter of Christ's Hospital's nurse. The poem describes love, admiration, and praise of her body but in innocent manner:

Fair, as the bosom of the Swan
That rises graceful o'er the wave,
I've seen your breast with pity heave,
And therefore love I you, sweet Genevieve!

— lines 11–14

== Themes ==
Coleridge held views similar to Plotinus, expressed in Enneads, that suffering resulted from sin and vice, and that suffering can be overcome by acting virtuously. However, he believed that he lacked the will power needed to be disciplined enough to free himself of vice. "Pain" describes the urgency in trying to understand how to deal with this lack of will power, as the struggle of morality and suffering were causing him great problems. Eventually, he would continue trying to understand the nature of suffering in his "Progress of Vice" and other poems. Also, the witnessing of others not suffering caused even more pain. As Emanuel Papper and Sherwin Nuland point out, "The contrast between the sunken eyes of Coleridge, the victim of rheumatic fever and its attendant pain, with the eyes of healthy boys at play was a poignant one and for the sick boy an unforgettable, unpleasant experience. The tyranny of pain was dominant, and it removed all possible pleasure and happiness because of its overwhelming and pervasive influences."

The sonnet contains a few biographical elements beyond Coleridge's sickness. The sonnet on pain directly deals with the pain at the sanatorium, and even the revisions reflect Coleridge's time at the school: the original line 12 stated "Muses lyre" instead of "festive lyre". The change reflects the criticism by Coleridge's school teacher about use of terms like Muse. "A Few Lines" is connected to the same incident and deals with delirium. "Genevieve" deals with the daughter of the nurse working at the sanatorium, and the name was to be used again in Coleridge's poem "Love" (1799). To the nurse that treated him, Coleridge was grateful to an extent uncommon in his life, and he was to eventually help her when she was a poor widow years later. However, some critics see the figure of Genevieve as disconnected from the biographical incidents and refers instead to either Sarah Hutchinson or a figure like her appearing in many of Coleridge's works.

== Critical response ==
Papper and Nuland believe that the "Pain" sonnet is an "impressive poem" that "was Coleridge's first major description of the impact of disease or injury on him and its consequent production of pain and suffering."
