= Dura Navis =

Poem written by Samuel Taylor Coleridge

"Dura Navis" was composed by Samuel Taylor Coleridge in 1787. It is one of his earliest known poems and was written for a school assignment while Coleridge attended Christ's Hospital. The poem describes the pain of solitude that accompanies travel and the risks that accompany a voyage at sea, including combat against others and resorting to cannibalism.

== Background ==
"Dura Navis", along with "Easter Holidays" and "Niul Pejus est Caelibe Vita", is one of Coleridge's earliest known poems. "Dura Navis" was written for an exercise while Coleridge attended Christ's Hospital at the age of 15. Of this exercise Coleridge wrote in a note to the poem:

I well remember old Jemmy Bowyer, the plagose Orbilius of Christ's Hospital, but an admirable Educer no less than Educator of the Intellect, bad me leave out as many epithets as would turn the whole into 8-syllable Lines,-and then asked myself if the Exercise would not be greatly improved. How often have I thought of this proposal since then-and how many thousand bloated and puffing lines have I read that by this process would have tripped over the tongues excellently. Likewise I remember that he told me on the same occasion—'Coleridge! the connections of a Declamation are not the transitions of Poetry—bad, however, as they are, they are better than "Apostrophes" and "O thou's," for at the worst they are something like common sense. The others are the grimaces of Lunacy'.

== Poem ==
The poem begins by describing a voyage, an image connected to his own separation from home:

To tempt the dangerous deep, too venturous youth,
Why does thy breast with fondest wishes glow?
No tender parent there thy cares shall sooth,
No much-lov'd Friend shall share thy every woe.
Why does thy mind with hopes delusive burn?
Vain are thy Schemes by heated Fancy plann'd:
Thy promis'd joy thou'lt see to Sorrow turn
Exil'd from Bliss, and from thy native land.

— lines 1–8

Then the poem portrays the emergence of the moon:

Whilst total darkness overspreads the skies;
Save when the lightnings darting wingéd Fate
Quick bursting from the pitchy clouds between
In forkéd Terror, and destructive state
Shall shew with double gloom the horrid scene?

— lines 12-16

Eventually, the traveller becomes involved with a battle at sea:

Yet not the Tempest, or the Whirlwind's roar
Equal the horrors of a Naval Fight,
When thundering Cannons spread a sea of Gore
And varied deaths now fire and now affright:
The impatient shout, that longs for closer war,
Reaches from either side the distant shores;
Whilst frighten'd at His streams ensanguin'd far
Loud on his troubled bed huge Ocean roars.

— lines 25-32

As the poem continues, the narrator puts forth the idea that if the traveller survives, there is also the threat of having to resort to cannibalism:

Should'st thou escape the fury of that day
A fate more cruel still, unhappy, view.
Opposing winds may stop thy luckless way,
And spread fell famine through the suffering crew,
Canst thou endure th' extreme of raging Thirst
Which soon may scorch thy throat, ah! thoughtless Youth!
Or ravening hunger canst thou bear which erst
On its own flesh hath fix'd the deadly tooth?

— lines 41-48

== Themes ==
The poem describes many images that appear throughout Coleridge's early works. The emergence of the moon in a baroque manner, and this image reappears in his poem "To the Autumnal Moon" and in his "The Nightingale". In terms of themes, "Dura Navis", like Coleridge's other early poems, incorporates a Plotinus-like view that people should live more simply and control their passions and desires.

"Dura Navis" is dominated by the image of a voyage that is possibly a reference to Frank Coleridge, Coleridge's brother and a sailor. Although Frank left home at the age of 11, there are parallels to Coleridge's own life and his loneliness at Christ's Hospital. To Coleridge, travel is related to the idea of solitude and of travel found within many of his early works and later in his Rime of the Ancient Mariner. Coleridge was to later emphasises the need of companionship to overcome the loneliness of life.

== Critical response ==
An article in late 19th-century The University Magazine and Free Review attributed the failure of Coleridge's early poetry to his education. Boyer did teach the students literature and emphasised simplicity within poetry as Coleridge's account of Boyer's correcting of "Dura Navis". However, "It was still the day of mechanical scansion and didactic appreciation" and the education "did not then include Spenser; and not from Boyer would a pupil learn the magic of Milton's and Shakespere's rhythms." A few years later, Walter De la Mare said he believed that the "best line" in the poem "would have been ruined had Coleridge taken" the advice of his schoolmaster.
