= Mary Evans =

Lover of Samuel Taylor Coleridge

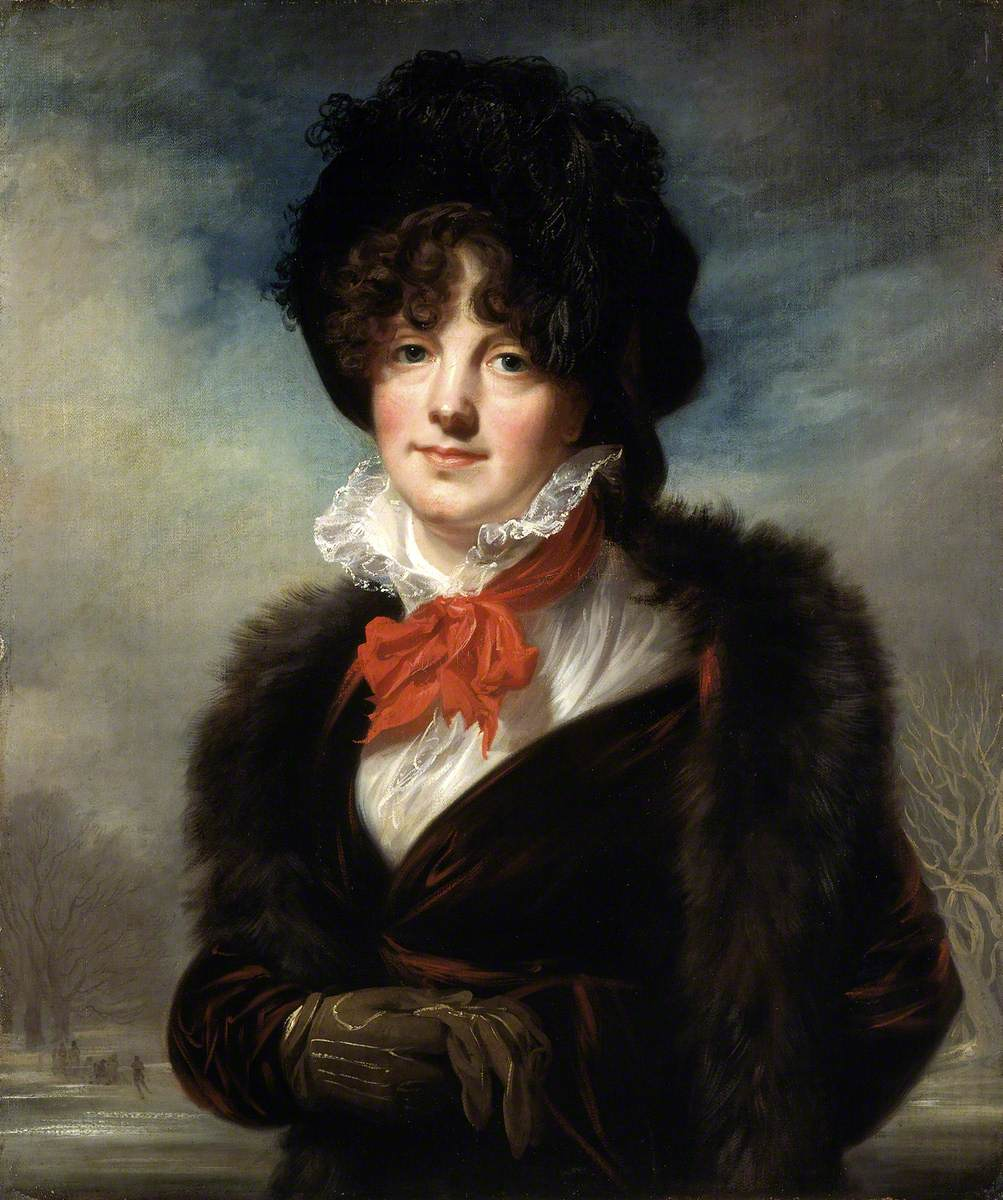
Portrait of Mary Todd (née Evans) by Joseph Allen (c. 1798)

Mary Evans (1770–1843), married name Mary Todd, was a British woman of the Georgian era, notable as the first love of Samuel Taylor Coleridge, and although he failed to profess his feelings to Evans during their early relationship, he held her in affection until 1794 when Evans dissuaded his attentions.

== Early life ==
Mary was born in London in 1770, where her father, Maurice Evans had a shop in West Cheap. Her mother (née Charlotte Lloyd) was from Wrexham, Wales. She had three sisters and five brothers.

== Relationship to Coleridge ==
After the death of his father in 1781, Coleridge attended Christ's Hospital, a boarding school in London. While in London, Coleridge befriended several boys at the school, including Tom Evans. During 1788 he and other friends visited Tom Evans' home in London, where he met Tom's eldest sister, Mary Evans. Coleridge became infatuated with Evans.

Evans became Coleridge's first love: "whom for five years I loved-almost to madness". In December 1793 Coleridge enlisted as a private in the 15th Light Dragoons under the false name "Silas Tomkyn Comberbache", possibly because of he felt rejected by Mary (although others have suggested he may have been escaping debt). Coleridge's brothers were able to ensure his discharge a few months later on grounds of temporary insanity and he was able to return to Cambridge.

Although he felt passionately about her, he did not share his feelings with her, and when he happened to see her leaving a church in Wrexham in 1794 he 'turned sick and all but fainted away'. The "relationship" lasted only a short while, and in October 1795, she married Fryer Todd. They had five children, and Mary died in 1843.

When Coleridge made plans with friend and future brother-in-law, Robert Southey, to emigrate to the "banks of the Susquahanna," Evans wrote to Coleridge imploring him not to go. The letter reopened old feelings for Coleridge, inspiring the poem "Sonnet: To my Own Heart," which he published in his "three earlier and three later collections, as well as in Sonnets from Various Authors and has also received the title On a Discovery Made to Late. The poem was also included in letters to Robert Southey and Francis Wrangham in October, 1794, and he inserts several of the lines into a response letter to Evans in early November, after hearing of her engagement plans. Coleridge and Evans met again for the last time in 1808.

== The Sigh ==
Coleridge dedicated his poem The Sigh (1794) to Mary Evans, who is mentioned by name in the poem.

When Youth his faery reign began
Ere Sorrow had proclaim'd me man;
While Peace the present hour beguil'd,
And all the lovely Prospect smil'd;
Then Mary! 'mid my lightsome glee
I heav'd the painless Sigh for thee.

And when, along the waves of woe,
My harass'd Heart was doom'd to know
The frantic burst of Outrage keen,
And the slow Pang that gnaws unseen;
Then shipwreck'd on Life's stormy sea
I heaved an anguish'd Sigh for thee!

But soon Reflection's power imprest
A stiller sadness on my breast;
And sickly Hope with waning eye
Was well content to droop and die:
I yielded to the stern decree,
Yet heav'd a languid Sigh for thee!

And though in distant climes to roam,
A wanderer from my native home,
I fain would soothe the sense of Care,
And lull to sleep the Joys that were!
Thy Image may not banish'd be--
Still, Mary! still I sigh for thee.
