= Norman Fruman =

Norman Fruman (December 2, 1923 – April 19, 2012) was an American literary scholar.

== Early life and education ==
Born in the Bronx, New York, to Ukraine immigrant parents, Fruman attended Townsend Harris Hall and City College of New York. During World War II, he served as an infantry platoon leader, was captured at the Battle of the Bulge, and spent time as a prisoner of war in Bavaria until liberation in April 1945.

After the war, Fruman completed his bachelor's degree at City College of New York and obtained a master's degree in English from Teachers College, Columbia University. He briefly wrote adventure and science-fiction stories for comic books and was co-winner of the television quiz show The $64,000 Challenge in 1957. He earned a Ph.D. from New York University, where his dissertation research evolved into his critical examination of Coleridge.

== Career ==
Fruman taught at California State University, Los Angeles, and the University of Minnesota. At Minnesota, he was active in organizations such as the Association of Literary Scholars and Critics (now the Association of Literary Scholars, Critics, and Writers), and founded the Minnesota chapter of the National Association of Scholars, groups dedicated to advocating for traditional literary scholarship. He also wrote extensively on William Wordsworth and co-edited Studies in J.D. Salinger: Reviews, Essays and Critiques with Marvin Laser.

== Bibliography ==
- Coleridge : the damaged archangel. New York: G. Braziller. 1971. ISBN 978-0-8076-0607-0.
