= List of poems by William Wordsworth =

This article lists the complete poetic bibliography of William Wordsworth, including his juvenilia, describing his poetic output during the years 1785-1797, and any previously private and, during his lifetime, unpublished poems.

== Key ==
Use of Semi-colon to demarcate classes assigned to a poem
Classed as (by Wordsworth)
[Class 1]; [Class 2]; [Class 3] ' et cetera

== 1785–1789 ==
Title	Composition date	Subtitle or former titles	Index of first lines	Classed as (by Wordsworth)	Publication date
Lines written as a School Exercise	1785	Written as a School Exercise at Hawkshead, Anno Aetatis 14. Lines on the Bicentenary of Hawkshead School.	"And has the Sun his flaming chariot driven"	Juvenile Pieces	Unknown
Extract	1786	From the Conclusion of a Poem Composed in Anticipation of Leaving School	"Dear native regions, I foretell,"	Juvenile Pieces ; Poems Written in Youth	1815
Written in very Early Youth	1786? / Unknown	Written while sailing in a boat at Evening	"Calm is all nature as a resting wheel."	Miscellaneous Sonnets; Poems Written in Youth	1807
An Evening Walk	1787–1789	Addressed to a young lady	"The young Lady to whom this was addressed was my Sister. It was"	Juvenile Pieces ; Poems Written in Youth	1793
Lines	1789	Written while sailing in a boat at Evening	"How richly glows the water's breast"	Poems of Sentiment and Reflection; Poems Written in Youth	1798
Remembrance of Collins	1789	Composed upon the Thames near Richmond	"Glide gently, thus for ever glide,"	Juvenile Pieces ; Poems Written in Youth	1798

== 1790–1799 ==
Title	Composition date	Subtitle or former titles	Index of first lines	Classed as (by Wordsworth)	Publication date
Descriptive Sketches	1791–1792	Taken during a Pedestrian Tour Among the Alps	"Were there, below, a spot of holy ground"	Juvenile Pieces (1815–1836); Distinct Class (with Female Vagrant) (1836–)	1793
Guilt and Sorrow; or, Incidents upon Salisbury Plain.	1791–1794		"A traveller on the skirt of Sarum's Plain"	Juvenile Pieces ; Poems Written in Youth; Distinct Class (with Descriptive sketches) (1836–); Poems of Early and Late Years	1798
Female Vagrant	1791–1794		"'By Derwent's side my father dwelt—a man"	Juvenile Pieces ; Poems Written in Youth; Distinct Class (with Descriptive sketches) (1836–);	1798
Lines (2)	1795	Left upon a Seat in a Yew-tree, which stands near the Lake of Esthwaite, on a desolate part of the shore, commanding a beautiful prospect.	"Nay, Traveller! rest. This lonely Yew-tree stands"	Poems of Sentiment and Reflection.(1815–43); Poems written in Youth(1845)	1798
The Reverie of Poor Susan	1797	Former title: Bore the title of "Poor Susan" from 1800–1805	"At the corner of Wood Street, when daylight appears,"	Poems of the Imagination	1800
When Love was born of heavenly line	1795		"When Love was born of heavenly line,"	No class assigned	1795
1798: A Night-Piece	1798		"The sky is overcast"	Poems of the Imagination	1815
We are Seven	1798	Manuscript title: Bore the title of "'We are Seven, or Death".	"A Simple Child,"	Poems referring to the Period of Childhood	1798
Anecdote for Fathers	1798	Former title: Bore the title of "Anecdote for Fathers, showing how the practise of lying may be taught" from 1798–1804	"I Have a boy of five years old;"	Poems referring to the Period of Childhood	1798
The Thorn	1798, 19 March		"'There is a Thorn--it looks so old,"	Poems of the Imagination	1798
Goody Blake and Harry Gill	1798	A True Story	"Oh! what's the matter? what's the matter?"	Poems of the Imagination (1815–1843); Miscellaneous Poems (1845–)	1798
Her eyes are Wild	1798	Former title: Bore the title of "The Mad Mother" from 1798–1805	"Her eyes are wild, her head is bare,"	Poems founded on the Affections (1815–20); Poems of the Imagination (1827–32); Poems founded on the Affections (1836–)	1798
Simon Lee	1798	The Old Huntsman; With an Incident in which he was concerned	"With an incident in which he was concerned"	Poems of Sentiment and Reflection	1798
Lines written in Early Spring	1798		"I heard a thousand blended notes"	Poems of Sentiment and Reflection	1798
To my Sister	1798	Former titles: Bore the title of: "Lines written at a small distance from my House, and sent by my little Boy to the person to whom they are addressed." from 1798–1815 and "To my Sister; written at a small distance from my House, and sent by my little Boy" from 1820–1843. From 1845 onward the poem bore the current title.	"It is the first mild day of March:"	Poems of Sentiment and Reflection	1798
A whirl-blast from behind the hill	1798, 18 March		"A Whirl-Blast from behind the hill"	Poems of the Fancy	1800
Expostulation and Reply	1798		"'Why, William, on that old grey stone,"	Poems of Sentiment and Reflection	1798
The Tables Turned	1798	an evening scene on the same subject. (with reference to "Expostulation and Reply"	"Up! up! my Friend, and quit your books;"	Poems of Sentiment and Reflection	1798
The Complaint of a Forsaken Indian Woman	1798		"Before I see another day,"	Poems founded on the Affections.	1798
The Last of the Flock	1798		"In distant countries have I been,"	Poems founded on the Affections.	1798
The Idiot Boy	1798		"'Tis eight o'clock,--a clear March night,"	Poems founded on the Affections.	1798
Lines	1798, 13 July	Composed a few miles above Tintern Abbey, On Revisiting the Banks of the Wye during a Tour. Former title: Bore the title of: "Lines, written a few miles, etc." in the 1798 edition. From 1815 onward, the poem bore the current title.	"Five years have past; five summers, with the length"	Poems of the Imagination	1798
The Old Cumberland Beggar	1798	Manuscript title: "Description of a Beggar"	"I saw an aged Beggar in my walk;"	Poems referring to the Period of Old Age.	1800
Animal Tranquillity and Decay	1798	Former titles: Bore the title of: "Old Man Travelling; Animal Tranquillity and Decay, a Sketch" in the 1798 edition and "Animal Tranquillity and Decay. A Sketch. " in the 1800 edition.	"The little hedgerow birds,"	Poems referring to the Period of Old Age.	1798
Peter Bell	1798	A Tale Former title: Bore the title of "Peter Bell: A Tale in Verse" in the 1819 edition.	"There's something in a flying horse,"	Poems of the Imagination	1819
The Simplon Pass	1799		"Brook and road"	Poems of the Imagination	1845
Influence of Natural Objects	1799	In calling forth and strengthening the imagination of boyhood and early youth	"Wisdom and Spirit of the universe!"	Poems referring to the Period of Childhood	1809
There was a Boy	1798	Former title: Bore the lack of a title between 1800–1832. From 1836 onward the poem bore the current title.	"There was a Boy; ye knew him well, ye cliffs"	Poems of the Imagination	1800
Nutting	1799		"It seems a day"	Poems of the Imagination	1800
A Poet's Epitaph	1799		"Art thou a Statist in the van"	Poems of Sentiment and Reflection.	1800
Address to the Scholars of the Village School of ------	1798 or 1799		"I come, ye little noisy Crew,"	Poems, chiefly of Early and Late Years; Epitaphs and Elegiac Pieces. (1845-)	1841
Matthew	1799	Former title: Bore the lack of a title from 1800–1820 and the title of: "IF Nature, for a favourite child," from 1827–1832.	"If Nature, for a favourite child,"	Poems of Sentiment and Reflection.	1800
The two April Mornings	1799		"We walked along, while bright and red"	Poems of Sentiment and Reflection.	1800
The Fountain.	1799	A Conversation	"We talked with open heart, and tongue"	Poems of Sentiment and Reflection.	1800
To a Sexton	1799				
"Let thy wheel-barrow alone--"	Poems of the Fancy	1800			
The Danish Boy	1799	A Fragment Former title: Bore the title of: "A Fragment" from 1800–1832 and "A Danish boy. A Fragment" from 1836 onwards	"Between two sister moorland rills"	Poems of the Fancy	1800
Lucy Gray; or, Solitude	1799				
"Oft I had heard of Lucy Gray:"	Poems referring to the Period of Childhood.	1800			
Ruth	1799		"When Ruth was left half desolate,"	Poems founded on the Affections (1815–20); Poems of the Imagination (1827–)	1800
Written in Germany, on one of the coldest days of the Century	1799	On one of the Coldest Days of the Century. Former title: Preceding Publication was titled: "The Fly"	"A plague on your languages, German and Norse!"	Poems of Sentiment and Reflection	1800

== 1800–1809 ==
Title	Composition date	Subtitle or former titles	Index of first lines	Classed as (by Wordsworth)	Publication date
The Brothers	1800		"'These Tourists, heaven preserve us! needs must live"	Poems founded on the Affections.	1800
Michael. A Pastoral Poem	1800		"If from the public way you turn your steps"	Poems founded on the Affections.	1800
The Idle Shepherd-boys; or, Dungeon-Ghyll Force.	1800	A Pastoral	"The valley rings with mirth and joy;"	Poems referring to the Period of Childhood.	1800
The Pet-lamb	1800	A Pastoral	"The dew was falling fast, the stars began to blink;"	Poems referring to the Period of Childhood.	1800
I	1800		"It was an April morning, fresh and clear"	Poems on the Naming of Places	1800
II	1800	To Joanna	"Amid the smoke of cities did you pass"	Poems on the Naming of Places	1800
III	1800		"There is an Eminence,--of these our hills"	Poems on the Naming of Places	1800
IV	1800		"A narrow girdle of rough stones and crags"	Poems on the Naming of Places	1800
V	1800	To M. H.	"Our walk was far among the ancient trees:"	Poems on the Naming of Places	1800
The Waterfall and the Eglantine	1800		"'Begone, thou fond presumptuous Elf,' "	Poems of the Fancy.	1800
The Oak and the Broom	1800	A Pastoral	"His simple truths did Andrew glean"	Poems of the Fancy.	1800
Hart-leap Well	1800		"The Knight had ridden down from Wensley Moor"	Poems of the Imagination	1800
Tis said, that some have died for love	1800		" 'Tis said, that some have died for love:"	Poems founded on the Affections.	1800
The Childless Father	1800		"'Up, Timothy, up with your staff and away!"	Poems founded on the Affections.	1800
Song for The Wandering Jew	1800		"Though the torrents from their fountains"	Poems of the Fancy	1800
Rural Architecture	1800		"There's George Fisher, Charles Fleming, and Reginald Shore,"	Poems referring to the Period of Childhood	1800
Ellen Irwin; or, The Braes of Kirtle	1800		"Fair Ellen Irwin, when she sate"	Poems founded on the Affections (1815 and 1820)	1800
Andrew Jones	1800		"I hate that Andrew Jones; he'll breed"	Lyrical Ballads	1800
The Two Thieves; or, The Last Stage of Avarice	1798		"O now that the genius of Bewick were mine,"	Poems referring to the Period of Old Age.	1800
A Character	1800		"I marvel how Nature could ever find space"	Poems of Sentiment and Reflection.	1800
For the Spot where the Hermitage stood on St. Herbert's Island, Derwentwater	1800		"If thou in the dear love of some one Friend"	Inscriptions (1)	1800
Written with a Pencil upon a Stone in the Wall of the House (An Outhouse), on the Island at Grasmere.	1800		"Rude is this Edifice, and Thou hast seen"	Inscriptions (1)	1830? / Unknown
Written with a Slate Pencil upon a Stone, the Largest of a Heap lying near a Deserted Quarry, upon one of the Islands at Rydal	1798	Manuscript title: "Written with a ...upon one of the [lesser island] at Rydal."	"Stranger! this hillock of mis-shapen stones"	Inscriptions (1)	1800
The Sparrow's Nest	1801		"Behiold, within the leafy shade,"	Moods of my Mind (1807–15); Poems founded on the Affections, (1815–45); Poems referring to the Period of Childhood (1845–)	1807
1801	1801	Former title: Bore the title of: "Pelion and Ossa flourish side by side" from 1801–1836.	"Pelion and Ossa flourish side by side,"	Miscellaneous Sonnets	1815
The Prioress' Tale (from Chaucer)	1801		"'O Lord, our Lord! how wondrously,' (quoth she)"	Poems founded on the Affections. (1836–45); Selections from Chaucer modernised. (1845–)	1820
The Cuckoo and the Nightingale (from Chaucer)	1801		"The God of Love-'ah, benedicite!'"	Selections from Chaucer modernised. (1845–)	1841
Troilus and Cresida (from Chaucer)	1801		"Next morning Troilus began to clear"	Selections from Chaucer modernised. (1845–)	1841
The Sailor's Mother	1802, 11 and 12 March		"One morning (raw it was and wet---"	Poems founded on the Affection	1807
Alice Fell; or, Poverty	1802, 11 and 12 March		"The post-boy drove with fierce career,"	Poems referring to the Period of Childhood	1807
Beggars	1802, 13 and 14 March		"She had a tall man's height or more;"	Poems of the Imagination	1807
To a Butterfly (first poem)	1802, 14 March		"Stay near me---do not take thy flight!"	Poems referring to the Period of Childhood.	1807
The Emigrant Mother	1802, 16 and 17 March		"Once in a lonely hamlet I sojourned"	Poems founded on the Affection	1807
My heart leaps up when I behold	1802, 26 March		"My heart leaps up when I behold"	Poems referring to the Period of Childhood; Moods of my own Mind (1807)	1807
Among all lovely things my Love had been	1802, April		"Among all lovely things my Love had been;"	No class assigned	1807
Written in March while resting on the Bridge at the foot of Brothers Water	1802, 26 April		"The cock is crowing,"	Poems of the Imagination	1807
The Redbreast chasing the Butterfly	1802, 18 April		"Art thou the bird whom Man loves best,"	Poems of the Fancy	1807
To a Butterfly (second poem)	1802, 20 April		"I've watched you now a full half-hour,"	Poems founded on the Affections	1807
Foresight	1802, 28 April		"That is work of waste and ruin--"	Poems referring to the Period of Childhood	1807
To the Small Celandine (first poem)	1802, 30 April	Manuscript title: " To the lesser Celandine"	"Pansies, lilies, kingcups, daisies,"	Poems of the Fancy.	1807
To the same Flower (second poem) [Sequel to "To the Small Celandine"]	1802, 1 May		"Pleasures newly found are sweet"	Poems of the Fancy	1807
Resolution and Independence	1802, 3 May – 4 July		"There was a roaring in the wind all night;"	Poems of the Imagination	1807
I grieved for Buonaparte	1802, 21 May		"I Grieved for Buonaparte, with a vain"	Sonnets dedicated to Liberty; Poems dedicated to National Independence and Liberty. (1845–)	1807
A Farewell	1802, 29 May	Former titles: Bore the lack of a title in 1815 and 1820 editions, with subtitle: "Composed in the Year 1802" and the bore title: "A Farewell" in 1827 and 1832 editions with aforementioned subtitle. From 1836 onwards, the poem bore the current title.	"Farewell, thou little Nook of mountain-ground,"	Poems founded on the Affections.	1815
The Sun has long been set	1802, 8 June		"The sun has long been set,"	Evening Voluntaries	1807
Composed upon Westminster Bridge, Sept. 3, 1802	1802, 31 July		"Earth has not anything to show more fair:"	Miscellaneous Sonnets	1807
Composed by the Sea-side, near Calais, August 1802	1802, August		"Fair Star of evening, Splendour of the west,"	Sonnets dedicated to Liberty; Poems dedicated to National Independence and Liberty. (1845–)	1807
Calais, August 1802	1802, 7 August		"Is it a reed that's shaken by the wind,"	Sonnets dedicated to Liberty; Poems dedicated to National Independence and Liberty. (1845–)	1807
Composed near Calais, on the Road leading to Ardres, August 7, 1802	1802, August		"Jones! as from Calais southward you and I"	Sonnets dedicated to Liberty; Poems dedicated to National Independence and Liberty. (1845–)	1807
Calais, August 15, 1802	1802, 15 August		"Festivals have I seen that were not names:"	Sonnets dedicated to Liberty; Poems dedicated to National Independence and Liberty. (1845–)	1807
It is a beauteous evening, calm and free	1802, August		"It is a beauteous evening, calm and free,"	Miscellaneous Sonnets	1807
On the Extinction of the Venetian Republic	1802, August		"Once did she hold the gorgeous East in fee;"	Sonnets dedicated to Liberty; Poems dedicated to National Independence and Liberty. (1845–)	1807
The King of Sweden	1802, August		"The Voice of song from distant lands shall call"	No class assigned	1807
To Toussaint L'Ouverture	1802, August		"Toussaint, the most unhappy man of men!"	No class assigned	1807
Composed in the Valley near Dover, on the day of landing	1802, August 30		"Here, on our native soil, we breathe once more."	No class assigned	1807
September 1, 1802	1802, 1 September		"We had a female Passenger who came"	No class assigned	1807
September, 1802, Near Dover	1802, September	Former title: Bore the title of: "September, 1802" from 1807–1843. From 1845 onward, the poem bore the current title.	"Inland, within a hollow vale, I stood;"	No class assigned	1807
Written in London, September 1802	1802, September		"O Friend! I know not which way I must look"	No class assigned	1807
London, 1802	1802, September		"Milton! thou should'st be living at this hour:"	No class assigned	1807
Composed after a Journey across the Hambleton Hills, Yorkshire	1802, 4 October	Former title: Bore the title of: "Composed after a Journey across the [Hamilton] Hills, Yorkshire" from 1807–1827	"Dark and more dark the shades of evening fell;"	Miscellaneous Sonnets	1807
Stanzas written in my Pocket-copy of Thomson's "Castle of Indolence"	1802, 11 May		"Within our happy castle there dwelt One"	Poems founded on the Affections.	1815
To H. C. Six years old	1802		"O Thou! whose fancies from afar are brought;"	Poems referring to the Period of Childhood	1807
To the Daisy (first poem)	1802		"In youth from rock to rock I went,"	Poems of the Fancy	1807
To the same Flower (second poem) [sequel to "To The Daisy"]	1802		"With little here to do or see"	Poems of the Fancy	1807
To the Daisy (third poem)	1802		"Bright Flower! whose home is everywhere,"	Poems of the Fancy (1815–32); Poems of Sentiment and Reflection (1837–)	1807
The Green Linnet	1803		"Beneath these fruit-tree boughs that shed"	Poems of the Fancy	1807
Yew-trees	1803		"There is a Yew-tree, pride of Lorton Vale,"	Poems of the Imagination	1815
Who fancied what a pretty sight	1803	Manuscript title: "Coronet of Snowdrops"	"Who fancied what a pretty sigh"	Moods of my own Mind (1807); Poems of the Fancy	1807
It is no Spirit who from heaven hath flown	1803		"It is no Spirit who from heaven hath flown,"	Moods of my own Mind (1807); Poems of the Imagination	1807
Departure from the vale of Grasmere, August 1803 (I)	1811		"The gentlest Shade that walked Elysian plains"	Memorials of a Tour in Scotland, 1803	1827
At the Grave of Burns, 1803. Seven years after his death (II)	1803		"I shiver, Spirit fierce and bold,"	Memorials of a Tour in Scotland, 1803	1842
Thoughts suggested the Day following, on the Banks of Nith, near the Poet's Residence (III)	1803		"Too frail to keep the lofty vow"	Memorials of a Tour in Scotland, 1803	1842
To the Sons of Burns, after visiting the Grave of their Father (IV)	1803		"'Mid crowded obelisks and urns"	Poems of Sentiment and Reflection (1815 and 1820); Memorials of a Tour in Scotland, 1803	1807
To a Highland Girl (at Inversneyde, upon Loch Lomond) (V)	1803		"Sweet Highland Girl, a very shower"	Poems of the Imagination (1815 and 1820); Memorials of a Tour in Scotland, 1803	1807
Glen Almain; or, The Narrow Glen (VI)	1803		"In this still place, remote from men,"	Poems of the Imagination (1815 and 1820); Memorials of a Tour in Scotland, 1803	1807
Stepping Westward (VII)	1803 and 1805		"'What, you are stepping westward?'--'Yea.'"	Poems of the Imagination (1815 and 1820); Memorials of a Tour in Scotland, 1803	1807
The Solitary Reaper (VIII)	1803 and 1805		"Behold her, single in the field,"	Poems of the Imagination (1815 and 1820); Memorials of a Tour in Scotland, 1803	1807
Address to Kilchurn Castle, upon Loch Awe (IX)	1803		"Child of loud-throated War! the mountain Stream"	Memorials of a Tour in Scotland, 1803	1827
Rob Roy's Grave (X)	1803 and 1805		"A Famous man is Robin Hood,"	Poems of Sentiment and Reflection (1815 and 1820); Memorials of a Tour in Scotland, 1803	1807
Sonnet. Composed at ------ Castle (Degenerate Douglas) (XI)	1803, 18 September		"Degenerate Douglas! oh, the unworthy Lord!"	Miscellaneous Sonnets (1815 and 1820); Memorials of a Tour in Scotland, 1803	1807
Yarrow Unvisited (XII)	1803		"From Stirling castle we had see"	Poems of the Imagination (1815 and 1820); Memorials of a Tour in Scotland, 1803	1807
The Matron of Jedborough and her Husband (XIII)	1803 and 1805		"Age! twine thy brows with fresh spring flowers,"	Poems referring to the Period of Old Age (1815 and 1820); Memorials of a Tour in Scotland, 1803	1807
On Approaching Home After A Tour In Scotland, 1803 (XIV)	1803, 25 September	Former title: Bore the title: "On Approaching Home After A Tour In Scotland, 1803" in 1815 and 1820 editions.	"Fly, some kind Harbinger, to Grasmere-dale!"	Miscellaneous Sonnets (1815 and 1820); Memorials of a Tour in Scotland, 1803	1815
The Blind Highland Boy. (XV)	Unknown	A tale told by the fire-side after Returning to the Vale of Grasmere. Former title: Bore the title of "The Blind Highland Boy. (A Tale told by the Fireside.)" from 1807–1820.	"Now we are tired of boisterous joy,"	Poems referring to the Period of Childhood (1815 and 1820); Memorials of a Tour in Scotland, 1803	1807
October 1803	1803		"One might believe that natural miseries"	Sonnets dedicated to Liberty; Poems dedicated to National Independence and Liberty. (1845–)	1807
There is a bondage worse, far worse, to bear	1803		"There is a bondage worse, far worse, to bear"	Sonnets dedicated to Liberty; Poems dedicated to National Independence and Liberty. (1845–)	1807
October 1803 (2)	1803		"These times strike monied worldlings with dismay"	Sonnets dedicated to Liberty; Poems dedicated to National Independence and Liberty. (1845–)	1807
England! the time is come when thou should'st wean	1803		"England! the time is come when thou should'st wean"	Sonnets dedicated to Liberty; Poems dedicated to National Independence and Liberty. (1845–)	1807
October 1803 (3)	1803		"When, looking on the present face of things,"	Sonnets dedicated to Liberty; Poems dedicated to National Independence and Liberty. (1845–)	1807
To the Men of Kent	1803, October		"Vanguard of Liberty, ye men of Kent,"	Sonnets dedicated to Liberty; Poems dedicated to National Independence and Liberty. (1845–)	1807
In the Pass of Killicranky, an invasion being expected, October 1803	1803, October	Former title: Bore the title of: "October, 1803" from 1807 to 1820.	"Six thousand veterans practised in war's game,"	Sonnets dedicated to Liberty (1807–20)	1807
Anticipation. October 1803	1803, October		"Shout, for a mighty Victory is won!"	Sonnets dedicated to Liberty; Poems dedicated to National Independence and Liberty. (1845–)	1807
Lines on the expected Invasion	1803		"Come ye--who, if (which Heaven avert!) the Land"	Poems dedicated to National Independence and Liberty	1842
The Farmer of Tilsbury Vale	1800		"'Tis not for the unfeeling, the falsely refined"	Poems dedicated to National Independence and Liberty	1815
To the Cuckoo	1802		"O Blithe New-comer! I have heard,"	Poems of the Imagination.	1807
She was a phantom of delight	1803		":She was a phantom of delight"	Poems of the Imagination	1807
I wandered lonely as a cloud	1804		"I wandered lonely as a cloud"	Moods of my own Mind (1807); Poems of the Imagination (1815–)	1807
The Affliction of Margaret ------	1804	Former title: Bore the title of: "The Affliction of Margaret—of—" in the 1807 edition and "The Affliction of Margaret" in the 1820 edition. From 1845 onward, the poem bore the current title. Manuscript title: "The Affliction of Mary—of—"	"Where art thou, my beloved Son,"	Poems founded on the Affections	1807
The Forsaken	1804		"The peace which other seek they find;"	Poems founded on the Affections	1842
Repentance.	1804	A Pastoral Ballad	"The fields which with covetous spirit we sold,"	Poems of Sentiment and Reflection (1820); Poems founded on the Affections (1827–)	1820
The Seven Sisters; or, The Solitude of Binnorie	1800		"'Seven Daughter had Lord Archibald,'"	Poems of the Fancy	1807
Address to my Infant Daughter, Dora	1804, 16 September	On Being Reminded that She was a Month Old that Day, September 16 Former title: Bore the title of: "Address to my Infant Daughter, on being reminded that she was a Month old, on that Day." from 1815–1845. Upon her death in 1847, her name was added to the title.	"Hast thou then survived-"	Poems of the Fancy	1815
The Kitten and Falling Leaves	1804	Former title: Bore the title of: "The Kitten and the Falling Leaves" from 1807–1832.	"That way look, my Infant, lo!"	Poems of the Fancy	1807
To the Spade of a Friend (An Agriculturist)	1806	Composed while we were labouring together in his Pleasure-Ground	"Spade! with which Wilkinson hath tilled his lands,"	Poems of Sentiment and Reflection	1807
The Small Celandine (third poem)	1804		"There is a Flower, the lesser Celandine,"	Poems referring to the Period of Old Age	1807
At Applethwaite, near Keswick, 1804	1804		"Beaumont! it was thy wish that I should rear"	Miscellaneous Sonnets	1842
From the same [Michael Angelo]. To the Supreme Being.	1804?		"The prayers I make will then be sweet indeed"	Miscellaneous Sonnets	1807
Ode to Duty	1805		"Stern Daughter of the Voice of God!"	Poems of Sentiment and Reflection	1807
To a Skylark	1805		"Up with me! up with me into the clouds!"	Poems, composed during a Tour, chiefly on foot. No. 2 (1807); Poems of the Fancy (1815–)	1807
Fidelity	1805		"A Barking sound the Shepherd hears,"	Poems of Sentiment and Reflection.	1807
Incident characteristic of a Favourite Dog	1805	Former title: Bore the title of: "Incident, Characteristic of a favourite Dog, which belonged to a Friend of the Author" in the 1807 and 1815 editions.	"On his morning rounds the Master"	Poems of Sentiment and Reflection.	1807
Tribute to the Memory of the same Dog (in reference to "Incident characteristic...)	1805		"Lie here, without a record of thy worth,"	Poems of Sentiment and Reflection.	1807
To the Daisy (fourth poem)	1805		"Sweet Flower! belike one day to have"	Epitaphs and Elegiac Pieces.	1815
Elegiac Stanzas, suggested by a Picture of Peele Castle in a Storm, painted by Sir George Beaumont	1805	Manuscript title: "Verses suggested, etc,"	"I was thy neighbour once, thou rugged Pile!"	Epitaphs and Elegiac Pieces.	1807
Elegiac Verses	1805	In Memory of My Brother, John Wordsworth, Commander of the E. I. Company's Ship, The Earl Of Abergavenny, in which He Perished by Calamitous Shipwreck, Feb. 6th, 1805.	"The Sheep-boy whistled loud, and lo!"	Epitaphs and Elegiac Pieces.	1842
VI	1800–1805		"When, to the attractions of the busy world,"	Poems on the Naming of Places	1815
Louisa. After accompanying her on a Mountain Excursion	1802	Former title: Bore the title of: "Louisa" from 1807–1832.	"I Met Louisa in the shade,"	Poems founded on the Affections	1807
To a Young Lady, who had been reproached for taking long Walks in the Country	1802		"Dear Child of Nature, let them rail!"	Poems of Sentiment and Reflection (1815–32); Poems of the Imagination (1836–)	1807
Vaudracour and Julia	1804		"O happy time of youthful lovers (thus"	Poems founded on the Affections	1820
The Cottager to her Infant, by my Sister	1805		"The days are cold, the nights are long,"	Poems founded on the Affections	1815
The Waggoner	1805		"'Tis spent--this burning day of June! "	No class assigned	1819
French Revolution	1805	As it appeared to enthusiasts at its commencement. reprinted from "the friend"	"Oh! pleasant exercise of hope and joy!"	Poems of the Imagination (1815–);	1809
Book First: Introduction—Childhood and School-time	1799–1805		"Oh there is blessing in this gentle breeze,"	The Prelude or, Growth of a Poet's Mind: Advertisement	1850
Book Second: School-time (continued)	1799–1805		"Thus far, O Friend! have we, though leaving much"	The Prelude or, Growth of a Poet's Mind: Advertisement	1850
Book Third: Residence at Cambridge	1799–1805		"It was a dreary morning when the wheels"	The Prelude or, Growth of a Poet's Mind: Advertisement	1850
Book Fourth: Summer Vacation	1799–1805		"Bright was the summer's noon when quickening steps"	The Prelude or, Growth of a Poet's Mind: Advertisement	1850
Book Fifth: Books	1799–1805		"When Contemplation, like the night-calm felt"	The Prelude or, Growth of a Poet's Mind: Advertisement	1850
Book Sixth: Cambridge and the Alps	1799–1805		"The leaves were fading when to Esthwaite's banks"	The Prelude or, Growth of a Poet's Mind: Advertisement	1850
Book Seventh: Residence in London	1799–1805		"Six changeful years have vanished since I first"	The Prelude or, Growth of a Poet's Mind: Advertisement	1850
Book Eighth: Retrospect—Love of Nature Leading to Love of Man	1799–1805		"What sounds are those, Helvellyn, that are heard"	The Prelude or, Growth of a Poet's Mind: Advertisement	1850
Book Ninth: Residence in France	1799–1805		"Even as a river,--partly (it might seem)"	The Prelude or, Growth of a Poet's Mind: Advertisement	1850
Book Tenth: Residence in France (continued)	1799–1805		"It was a beautiful and silent day"	The Prelude or, Growth of a Poet's Mind: Advertisement	1850
Book Eleventh: France (concluded)	1799–1805		"From that time forth, Authority in France"	The Prelude or, Growth of a Poet's Mind: Advertisement	1850
Book Twelfth: Imagination and Taste; How Impaired and Restored	1799–1805		"Long time have human ignorance and guilt"	The Prelude or, Growth of a Poet's Mind: Advertisement	1850
Book Thirteenth: Imagination and Taste; How Impaired and Restored (concluded)	1799–1805		"From Nature doth emotion come, and moods"	The Prelude or, Growth of a Poet's Mind: Advertisement	1850
Book Fourteenth: Conclusion	1799–1805		"In one of those excursions (may they ne'er"	The Prelude or, Growth of a Poet's Mind: Advertisement	1850
Character of the Happy Warrior	1806		"Who is the happy Warrior? Who is he"	Poems of Sentiment and Reflection	1807
The Horn of Egremont Castle	1806		"Ere the Brothers through the gateway"	Poems of the Imagination (1815–45); Miscellaneous Poems (1845–)	1807
A Complaint	1806		"There is a change--and I am poor;"	Poems founded on the Affection	1807
Stray Pleasures	1806	Former title: Bore the lack of a title in the 1807 and 1815 editions. From 1820 onward, the poem bore the current title. Manuscript title: "Dancers."	"By their floating mill,"	Poems of the Fancy	1807
Power of Music	1806	Manuscript title: "A Street Fiddler (in London)."	"An Orpheus! an Orpheus! yes, Faith may grow bold,"	Poems of the Imagination.	1807
Star-gazers	1806		"What crowd is this? what have we here we must not pass it by;"	Poems of the Imagination.	1807
Yes, it was the mountain Echo	1806		"Yes, it was the mountain Echo,"	Poems of the Imagination.	1807
NUNS fret not at their convent's narrow room,	1806	Former title: Bore the title of: "Prefatory Sonnet" from 1807–1820.	"Nuns fret not at their convent's narrow room,"	Miscellaneous Sonnets	1807
Personal Talk	1806	Former title: Bore the lack of a title in the 1807 and 1815 editions.	"I am not One who much or oft delight"	Poems of Sentiment and Reflection (1815); Miscellaneous Sonnets (1820–43); Poems of Sentiment and Reflection (1845–)	1807
Admonition	1806		"Well may'st thou halt-and gaze with brightening eye!"	Miscellaneous Sonnets	1807
Beloved Vale! I said, "when I shall con	1806		"'Beloved Vale!' I said, 'when I shall con"	Miscellaneous Sonnets	1807
How sweet it is, when mother Fancy rocks	1806		"How sweet it is, when mother Fancy rocks"	Miscellaneous Sonnets	1807
Those words were uttered as in pensive mood	1806		"Those words were uttered as in pensive mood"	Miscellaneous Sonnets	1807
Lines	1806	Composed at Grasmere, during a walk one Evening, after a stormy day, the Author having just read in a Newspaper that the dissolution of Mr. Fox was hourly expected.	"Clouds, lingering yet, extend in solid bars"	Epitaphs and Elegiac Pieces.; Miscellaneous Sonnets(1820); Sonnets dedicated to Liberty (1827)	1807
With how sad steps, O Moon, thou climb'st the sky	1806		"With how sad steps, O Moon, thou climb'st the sky,"	Poems of the Fancy (1815); Miscellaneous Sonnets (1820)	1807
The world is too much with us; late and soon	1806		"The world is too much with us; late and soon,"	Miscellaneous Sonnets	1807
With Ships the sea was sprinkled far and nigh	1806		"With ships the sea was sprinkled far and nigh,"	Miscellaneous Sonnets	1807
Where lies the Land to which yon Ship must go?	1806		"Where lies the Land to which yon Ship must go?"	Miscellaneous Sonnets	1807
To Sleep (1)	1806		"O gentle sleep! do they belong to thee,"	Miscellaneous Sonnets	1807
To Sleep (2)	1806		"Fond words have oft been spoken to thee, Sleep!"	Miscellaneous Sonnets	1807
To Sleep (3)	1806		"A flock of sheep that leisurely pass by,"	Miscellaneous Sonnets	1807
Michael Angelo in reply to the passage upon his Statue of Night sleeping	1806		"Grateful is Sleep, my life in stone bound fast;"	No class assigned	Unknown
From the Italian of Michael Angelo	1805?		"Yes! hope may with my strong desire keep pace,"	Miscellaneous Sonnets	1807
From the Same [of Michael Angelo]	1805?		"No mortal object did these eyes behold"	Miscellaneous Sonnets	1807
To the Memory of Raisley Calvert	1806		"Calvert! it must not be unheard by them"	Miscellaneous Sonnets	1807
Methought I saw the footsteps of a throne	1806		"Methought I saw the footsteps of a throne"	Miscellaneous Sonnets	1807
November 1806	1806		"Another year!--another deadly blow!"	Sonnets dedicated to Liberty; Poems dedicated to National Independence and Liberty. (1845–)	1807
Address to a Child	1806	during a boisterous winter Evening, by my Sister Former title: Bore the title of: "during a boisterous winter Evening, [by a female Friend of the Author]" from 1815–1843. In 1845 it was disclosed "by my Sister."	"What way does the Wind come? What way does he go?"	Poems referring to the Period of Childhood.	1815
Ode. Intimations of Immortality from Recollections of Early Childhood	1803–1806		"There was a time when meadow, grove, and stream,"	No class assigned	1807
A Prophecy. February 1807	1807		"High deeds, O Germans, are to come from you!"	Sonnets dedicated to Liberty; Poems dedicated to National Independence and Liberty (1845)	1807
Thought of a Briton on the Subjugation of Switzerland	1807		"Two Voices are there; one is of the sea,"	Sonnets dedicated to Liberty; Poems dedicated to National Independence and Liberty (1845)	1807
To Thomas Clarkson, on the Final Passing of the Bill for the Abolition of the Slave Trade	1807		"Clarkson! it was an obstinate hill to climb:"	Poems dedicated to National Independence and Liberty	1807
The Mother's Return	1807	By My Sister	"A Month, sweet Little-ones, is past"	Poems referring to the Period of Childhood.	1815
Gipsies	1807		"Yet are they here the same unbroken knot"	Poems of the Imagination	1807
O Nightingale! thou surely art	1807		"O Nightingale! thou surely art"	Poems of the Imagination	1807
To Lady Beaumont	1807		"Lady! the songs of Spring were in the grove"	Miscellaneous Sonnets	1807
Though narrow be that old Man's cares	1807		"Though narrow be that old Man's cares, and near,"	Poems belonging to the Period of Old Age (1815); Miscellaneous Sonnets (1820)	1807
Song at the Feast of Brougham Castle	1807		"High in the breathless Hall the Minstrel sate,"	Poems of the Imagination	1807
The White Doe of Rylstone; or, The Fate of the Nortons	1807–1810		"From Bolton's old monastic tower"	No class assigned	1815
The Force of Prayer; or, The Founding of Bolton Priory.	1807	A Tradition	" 'What is good for a bootless bene?' "	Poems of Sentiment and Reflection	1815
Composed while the Author was engaged in Writing a Tract occasioned by the Convention of Cintra	1808		"Not 'mid the world's vain objects that enslave"	Sonnets dedicated to Liberty	1815
Composed at the same Time and on the same Occasion, [as convention of cintra]	1808		"I Dropped my pen; and listened to the Wind"	Sonnets dedicated to Liberty	1815
George and Sarah Green	1808		"Who weeps for strangers? Many wept"	No class assigned	1839
Tyrolese Sonnets I	1809	Hoffer	"Of mortal parents is the Hero born"	Sonnets dedicated to Liberty	1809
Tyrolese Sonnets II	1809	Advance—come forth from thy Tyrolean ground	"Advance-come forth from thy Tyrolean ground,"	Sonnets dedicated to Liberty	1809
Tyrolese Sonnets III	1809	Feelings of the Tyrolese	"The Land we from our fathers had in trust,"	Sonnets dedicated to Liberty	1809
Tyrolese Sonnets IV	1809	Alas! what boots the long laborious quest	"Alas! what boots the long laborious quest"	Sonnets dedicated to Liberty	1809
And is it among rude untutored Dales	1809		"And is it among rude untutored Dales,"	Sonnets dedicated to Liberty	1809
O'er the wide earth, on mountain and on plain	1809		"O'er the wide earth, on mountain and on plain,"	Sonnets dedicated to Liberty	1809
Tyrolese Sonnets V	1809	On the Final Submission of the Tyrolese	"It was a 'moral' end for which they fought;"	Sonnets dedicated to Liberty	1809
Hail, Zaragoza! If with unwet eye	1809		"Hail, Zaragoza! If with unwet eye"	Sonnets dedicated to Liberty	1815
Say, what is Honour?--'Tis the finest sense	1809		"Say, what is Honour?--'Tis the finest sense"	Sonnets dedicated to Liberty	1815
Tyrolese Sonnets VI	1810?	The martial courage of a day is vain	"The martial courage of a day is vain,"	Sonnets dedicated to Liberty	1815
Brave Schill! by death delivered, take thy flight	1809		"Brave hill! by death delivered, take thy flight"	Sonnets dedicated to Liberty	1815
Call not the royal Swede unfortunate	1809		"Call not the royal Swede unfortunate,"	Sonnets dedicated to Liberty	1815
Look now on that Adventurer who hath paid	1809		"Look now on that Adventurer who hath paid"	Sonnets dedicated to Liberty	1815
Is there a power that can sustain and cheer	1809		"Is there a power that can sustain and cheer"	Sonnets dedicated to Liberty	1815

== 1810–1819 ==
Title	Composition date	Subtitle or former titles	Index of first lines	Classed as (by Wordsworth)	Publication date
Ah! where is Palafox? Nor tongue nor pen	1810		"Ah! where is Palafox? Nor tongue no pen"	Sonnets dedicated to Liberty	1815
In due observance of an ancient rite	1810		"In due observance of an ancient rite,"	Sonnets dedicated to Liberty	1815
Feelings of a Noble Biscayan at one of those Funerals	1810		"Yet, yet, Biscayans! we must meet our Foes"	Sonnets dedicated to Liberty	1815
On a celebrated Event in Ancient History	1810		"A Roman Master stands on Grecian ground,"	Sonnets dedicated to Liberty	1815
Upon the same Event [celebrated Event in Ancient History]	1810		"When, far and wide, swift as the beams of morn"	Sonnets dedicated to Liberty	1815
The Oak of Guernica	1810	Supposed Address to the Same	"Oak of Guernica! Tree of holier power"	Sonnets dedicated to Liberty	1815
Indignation of a high-minded Spaniard	1810		"We can endure that He should waste our lands,"	Sonnets dedicated to Liberty	1815
Avaunt all specious pliancy of mind	1810		"Avaunt all specious pliancy of mind"	Sonnets dedicated to Liberty	1815
O'erweening Statesmen have full long relied	1810		"O'erweening Statesmen have full long relied"	Sonnets dedicated to Liberty	1815
The French and the Spanish Guerillas	1810		"Hunger, and sultry heat, and nipping blast"	Sonnets dedicated to Liberty	1815
I	1810 or earlier		"Weep not, beloved Friends! nor let the air"	Epitaphs translated from Chiabrera; Sonnets dedicated to Liberty; Epitaphs and Elegiac Pieces.	1837
II	1810 or earlier		"Perhaps some needful service of the State"	Epitaphs translated from Chiabrera; Sonnets dedicated to Liberty; Epitaphs and Elegiac Pieces.	1810
III	1810 or earlier		"O Thou who movest onward with a mind"	Epitaphs translated from Chiabrera; Sonnets dedicated to Liberty; Epitaphs and Elegiac Pieces.	1810
IV	1810 or earlier		"There never breathed a man who, when his life"	Epitaphs translated from Chiabrera; Sonnets dedicated to Liberty; Epitaphs and Elegiac Pieces.	1809
V	1810 or earlier		"True is it that Ambrosio Salinero"	Epitaphs translated from Chiabrera; Sonnets dedicated to Liberty; Epitaphs and Elegiac Pieces.	1837
VI	1810 or earlier		"Destined to war from very infancy"	Epitaphs translated from Chiabrera; Sonnets dedicated to Liberty; Epitaphs and Elegiac Pieces.	1809
VII	1810 or earlier		"O flower of all that springs from gentle blood"	Epitaphs translated from Chiabrera; Sonnets dedicated to Liberty; Epitaphs and Elegiac Pieces.	1837
VIII	1810 or earlier		"Not without heavy grief of heart did He"	Epitaphs translated from Chiabrera; Sonnets dedicated to Liberty; Epitaphs and Elegiac Pieces.	1810
IX	1810 or earlier		"Pause, courteous Spirit!--Balbi supplicates"	Epitaphs translated from Chiabrera; Sonnets dedicated to Liberty; Epitaphs and Elegiac Pieces.	1810
Maternal Grief	1810		"Departed Child! I could forget thee once"	Poems founded on the Affections	1842
Characteristics of a Child three Years old	1811		"Loving she is, and tractable, though wild;"	Poems referring to the Period of Childhood	1815
Spanish Guerillas	1811		"They seek, are sought; to daily battle led,"	Sonnets dedicated to Liberty	1815
The power of Armies is a visible thing	1811		"The power of Armies is a visible thing,"	Sonnets dedicated to Liberty	1815
Here pause: the poet claims at least this praise	1811	Former title: Bore the title of: "Conclusion" in the 1815 edition.	"Here pause: the poet claims at least this praise,"	Sonnets dedicated to Liberty	1815
Epistle to Sir George Howland Beaumont, Bart.	1811	From the South-West Coast of Cumberland	"Far from our home by Grasmere's quiet Lake,"	Miscellaneous Poems	1842
Upon perusing the foregoing Epistle thirty years after its Composition	1811		"Soon did he Almighty Giver of all rest"	Miscellaneous Poems	1842
Upon the sight of a Beautiful Picture, painted by Sir G. H. Beaumont, Bart.	1811	Former title: Bore the title of: " Upon the Sight of a Beautiful Picture." in the 1815 edition.	"Praised be the Art whose subtle power could stay"	Miscellaneous Poems	1815
In the Grounds of Coleorton, the Seat of Sir George Beaumont, Bart., Leicestershire	1808		"The embowering rose, the acacia, and the pine,"	Inscriptions (2)	1815
In a Garden of the Same [of the grounds of Coleorton]	1811		"Oft is the medal faithful to its trust"	Inscriptions (2)	1815
Written at the Request of Sir George Beaumont, Bart., and in his Name, for an Urn	1808		"Ye Lime-trees, ranged before this hallowed Urn,"	Inscriptions (2)	1815

== 1810–1819 ==
Title	Composition date	Subtitle or former titles	Index of first lines	Classed as (by Wordsworth)	Publication date
For a Seat in the Groves of Coleorton	1811, 19 November		"Beneath yon eastern ridge, the craggy bound,"	Inscriptions (2)	1815
Composed on the eve of the Marriage of a Friend in the Vale of Grasmere	1812		"What need of clamorous bells, or ribands gay,"	Miscellaneous Sonnets	1815
Water-Fowl	1812		"Mark how the feathered tenants of the flood,"	Poems of the Imagination	1827
View from the top of Black Comb	1812		"This Height a ministering Angel might select:"	Poems of the Imagination	1815
Written with a Slate Pencil on a Stone, on the Side of the Mountain of Black Comb	1813		"Stay, bold Adventurer; rest awhile thy limbs"	Inscriptions (3)	1815
November 1813	1813		"Now that all hearts are glad, all faces bright,"	Sonnets dedicated to Liberty	1815
The Excursion: Preface to the Edition 1814	1795–1814		"'On Man, on Nature, and on Human Life,"	The Excursion	1814
Book First: The Wanderer	1795–1814		"'Twas summer, and the sun had mounted high:"	The Excursion	1814
Book Second: The Solitary	1795–1814		"In days of yore how fortunately fared"	The Excursion	1814
Book Third: Despondency	1795–1814		"A Humming Bee—a little tinkling rill—"	The Excursion	1814
Book Fourth: Despondency Corrected	1795–1814		"Here closed the Tenant of that lonely vale"	The Excursion	1814
Book Fifth: The Pastor	1795–1814		"'Farewell, deep Valley, with thy one rude House,"	The Excursion	1814
Book Sixth: The Churchyard among the Mountains	1795–1814		" Hail to the crown by Freedom shaped—to gird"	The Excursion	1814
Book Seventh: The Churchyard among the Mountains--(continued)	1795–1814		"While thus from theme to theme the Historian passed,"	The Excursion	1814
Book Eighth: The Parsonage	1795–1814		"The pensive Sceptic of the lonely vale"	The Excursion	1814
Book Ninth: Discourse of the Wanderer, and an Evening Visit to the Lake	1795–1814		"'To every Form of being is assigned,'"	The Excursion	1814
Laodamia	1814		"'With sacrifice before the rising morn"	Poems founded on the Affections (1815 and 1820); Poems of the Imagination	1815
Dion	1816	(see Plutarch)	"Serene, and fitted to embrace,"	Poems of Sentiment and Reflection. (1820–43); Poems of the Imagination (1845)	1820
Suggested by a beautiful ruin upon one of the Islands of Loch Lomond, (I)	1814	A place chosen for the retreat of a solitary individual, from whom this habitation acquired the name of The Brownie's Cell.	"To barren heath, bleak moor, and quaking fen,"	Memorials of a Tour in Scotland	1820
Composed at Cora Linn, in sight of Wallace's Tower (II)	1814		"Lord of the vale! astounding Flood;"	Memorials of a Tour in Scotland	1820
Effusion in the Pleasure-ground on the banks of the Bran, near Dunkeld (III)	1814		"What He—who, mid the kindred throng"	Memorials of a Tour in Scotland	1827
Yarrow Visited, September 1814 (IV)	1814		"And is this -Yarrow? -This the stream"	Memorials of a Tour in Scotland; Poems of the Imagination (1815 and 1820); Memorials of a Tour in Scotland (1827-)	1815
From the dark chambers of dejection freed	1814		"From the dark chambers of dejection freed,"	Miscellaneous Sonnets	1815
Lines written on a Blank Leaf in a Copy of the Author's Poem, "The Excursion,"	1814	Upon Hearing Of The Death Of The Late Vicar Of Kendal	"To public notice, with reluctance strong,"	Epitaphs and Elegiac Pieces	1815
To B. R. Haydon	1815, December		"High is our calling, Friend!--Creative Art"	Miscellaneous Sonnets	1816, 31 March
Artegal and Elidure	1815		"Where be the temples which, in Britain's Isle,"	Poems founded on the Affections	1820
September 1815	1815, October		"While not a leaf seems faded; while the fields,"	Miscellaneous Sonnets	1816, 11 February
November 1	1815, October		"How clear, how keen, how marvellously bright"	Miscellaneous Sonnets	1816, 28 January
The fairest, brightest, hues of ether fade	Unknown		"The fairest, brightest, hues of ether fade;"	Miscellaneous Sonnets	1815
Weak is the will of Man, his judgment blind	Unknown		"'Weak is the will of Man, his judgment blind;"	Miscellaneous Sonnets	1815
Hail, Twilight, sovereign of one peaceful hour!	Unknown		"Hail Twilight, sovereign of one peaceful hour!"	Miscellaneous Sonnets	1815
The Shepherd, looking eastward, softly said	Unknown		"The Shepherd, looking eastward, softly said,"	Miscellaneous Sonnets	1815
Even as a dragon's eye that feels the stress	Unknown		"Even as a dragon's eye that feels the stress"	Miscellaneous Sonnets	1815
Mark the concentred hazels that enclose	Unknown		"Mark the concentred hazels that enclose"	Miscellaneous Sonnets	1815
To the Poet, John Dyer	1811	Former title: Bore the title of: "To the Poet, Dyer"	"Bard of the Fleece, whose skilful genius made"	Miscellaneous Sonnets	1815
Brook! whose society the Poet seeks	1806		"Brook! whose society the Poet seeks,"	Miscellaneous Sonnets	1815
Surprised by joy — impatient as the Wind	Unknown		"Surprised by joy — impatient as the Wind"	Miscellaneous Sonnets	1815
Ode.--The Morning of the Day appointed for a General Thanksgiving, January 18, 1816	1816		"Hail, orient Conqueror of gloomy Night"	Sequel to Sonnets dedicated to Liberty	1816
Ode	1816		"Imagination--ne'er before content,"	Poems of the Imagination	1816
Invocation to the Earth, February 1816	1816	Composed immediately after the Thanksgiving Ode, to which it may be considered as a second part.	"'Rest, rest, perturbed Earth!"	Epitaphs and Elegiac Pieces.	1816
Ode	1816, January		"When the soft hand of sleep had closed the latch"	Poems of the Imagination (1820); Sonnets dedicated to Liberty (1827)	1816
Ode	1816		"Who rises on the banks of Seine,"	Poems of the Imagination (1820); Sonnets dedicated to Liberty	1816
The French Army in Russia, 1812–13	1816		"Humanity, delighting to behold"	Sonnets dedicated to Liberty	1816
On the same occasion [Of the French Army in Russia]	1816	(The Final Submission Of The Tyrolese)	"Ye Storms, resound the praises of your King!"	Sonnets dedicated to Liberty	1816
By Moscow self-devoted to a blaze	1816		"By Moscow self-devoted to a blaze"	No class assigned	1832
The Germans on the Heights of Hock heim	Unknown		"Abruptly paused the strife;--the field throughout"	Sonnets dedicated to Liberty (1827)	1822
Siege of Vienna raised by John Sobieski	1816, 4 February	February, 1816	"Oh, for a kindling touch from that pure flame"	Sonnets dedicated to Liberty	1816
Occasioned by the Battle of Waterloo, February 1816	1816, 4 February		"Intrepid sons of Albion! not by you"	Sonnets dedicated to Liberty	1816
Occasioned by the same battle [Battle of Waterloo]	1816, 4 February		"The Bard—whose soul is meek as dawning day,"	Sonnets dedicated to Liberty	1816
Emperors and Kings, how oft have temples rung	1816		"Emperors and Kings, how oft have temples rung"	Sonnets dedicated to Liberty	1827
Feelings of a French Royalist, On The Disinterment Of The Remains Of The Duke D'enghien	1816		"Dear Reliques! from a pit of vilest mould"	Sonnets dedicated to Liberty	1816
Translation of part of the First Book of the Aeneid	1823?		"But Cytherea, studious to invent"	No class assigned	1836
A Fact, and an Imagination; or, Canute and Alfred, on the Seashore	1816		"The Danish Conqueror, on his royal chair,"	Poems of Sentiment and Reflection	1820
A little onward lend thy guiding hand	1816		"'A little onward lend thy guiding hand"	Poems of Sentiment and Reflection	1820
To ------, on her First Ascent to the Summit of Helvellyn	1816		"Inmate of a mountain-dwelling,"	Poems of the Imagination	1820
Vernal Ode	1817		"Beneath the concave of an April sky,"	Poems of the Imagination (1820); Poems of Sentiment and Reflection (1827 and 1832); Poems of the Imagination (1836)	1820
Ode to Lycoris. May 1817	1817		"An age hath been when Earth was proud"	Poems of Sentiment and Reflection	1820
To the Same (Lycoris)	1817		"Enough of climbing toil!--Ambition treads"	Poems of Sentiment and Reflection	1820
The Longest Day. Addressed to my Daughter	1817		"Let us quit the leafy arbor,"	Poems referring to the Period of Childhood	1820
Hint from the Mountains for certain Political Pretenders	1817		"'Who but hails the sight with pleasure"	Poems of the Fancy	1820
The Pass of Kirkstone	1817, 27 June		"Within the mind strong fancies work,"	Poems of the Imagination	1820
Lament of Mary Queen of Scots, on the Eve of a New Year	1817		"Smile of the Moon!---for I so name"	Poems founded on the Affections	1820
Sequel to the "Beggars," 1802. Composed many years after	1817		"Where are they now, those wanton Boys?"	Poems of the Imagination	1827
The Pilgrim's Dream; or, The Star and the Glow-worm	1818		"A pilgrim, when the summer day"	Poems of the Fancy	1820
I	1818		"Hopes, what are they?—Beads of morning"	Inscriptions; Inscriptions supposed to be found in and near a Hermit's Cell	1820
II	1818	Inscribed upon a rock	"Pause, Traveller! whosoe'er thou be"	Inscriptions; Inscriptions supposed to be found in and near a Hermit's Cell	1820
III	1818		"Hast thou seen, with flash incessant"	Inscriptions; Inscriptions supposed to be found in and near a Hermit's Cell	1820
IV	1818		"Troubled long with warring notions"	Inscriptions; Inscriptions supposed to be found in and near a Hermit's Cell	1820
V	1818		"Not seldom, clad in radiant vest,"	Inscriptions; Inscriptions supposed to be found in and near a Hermit's Cell	1820
Composed upon an Evening of extraordinary Splendour and Beauty	1818		"Had this effulgence disappeared"	Poems of the Imagination (1820); Evening Voluntaries (1837)	1820
Composed during a Storm	1819		"One who was suffering tumult in his soul,"	Miscellaneous Sonnets	1819
This, and the Two Following, Were Suggested by Mr. W. Westall's Views of the Caves, Etc., in Yorkshire	1819		"Pure element of waters! wheresoe'er"	Miscellaneous Sonnets	1819
Malham Cove	1819		"Was the aim frustrated by force or guile,"	Miscellaneous Sonnets	1819
Gordale	1819		"At early dawn, or rather when the air"	Miscellaneous Sonnets	1819
Aerial Rock—whose solitary brow	1819		"Aerial Rock—whose solitary brow"	Miscellaneous Sonnets	1819
The Wild Duck's Nest	1819		"The imperial Consort of the Fairy-king"	Miscellaneous Sonnets	1819
Written upon a Blank Leaf in "The Complete Angler"	1819		"While flowing rivers yield a blameless sport,"	Miscellaneous Sonnets	1819
Captivity—Mary Queen of Scots	1819		"'As the cold aspect of a sunless way"	Miscellaneous Sonnets	1819
To a Snowdrop	1819		"Lone Flower, hemmed in with snows and white as they"	Miscellaneous Sonnets	1819
When Haughty expectations protrate life	1819	Former titles: Bore the title of: "On seeing a tuft of Snowdrops in a Storm" in the 1820 edition and "Composed a few days after the foregoing" in the 1827 edition, [Foregoing referring to "To a Snow-drop"]	"When haughty expectations prostrate lie,"	Miscellaneous Sonnets	1820
Composed in one of the Valleys of Westmoreland, on Easter Sunday	1819		"With each recurrence of this glorious morn"	Miscellaneous Sonnets	1819
Composed on Easter Sunday	1819?		"Erewhile to celebrate this glorious morn"	No class assigned	1819?
Grief, thou hast lost an ever-ready friend	1819		"Grief, thou hast lost an ever ready friend"	Miscellaneous Sonnets	1819
I watch, and long have watched, with calm regret	1819		"I watch, and long have watched, with calm regret"	Miscellaneous Sonnets	1819
I heard (alas! 'twas only in a dream)	1819		"I heard (alas! 'twas only in a dream)"	Miscellaneous Sonnets	1819
The Haunted Tree. To ------	1819		"Those silver clouds collected round the sun"	Poems of the Imagination	1820
September 1819	1819		"The sylvan slopes with corn-clad fields"	Poems of Sentiment and Reflection	1820
Upon the same Occasion [September 1819]	1819		"Departing summer hath assumed"	Poems of Sentiment and Reflection	1820
There is a little unpretending Rill	1806		"There is a little unpretending Rill"	Miscellaneous Sonnets	1820

== 1820–1829 ==
Title	Composition date	Subtitle or former titles	Index of first lines	Classed as (by Wordsworth)	Publication date
Composed on the Banks of a Rocky Stream	1820		"Dogmatic Teachers, of the snow-white fur!"	Miscellaneous Sonnets	1820
On the death of His Majesty (George the Third)	1820		"Ward of the Law!—dread Shadow of a King!"	Miscellaneous Sonnets	1820
The stars are mansions built by Nature's hand	1820		"The stars are mansions built by Nature's hand,"	Miscellaneous Sonnets	1820
To the Lady Mary Lowther	1820		"Lady! I rifled a Parnassian cave"	Miscellaneous Sonnets	1820
On the Detraction which followed the Publication of a certain Poem	1820		"A book came forth of late, called Peter Bell;"	Miscellaneous Sonnets	1820
Oxford, May 30, 1820	1820		"Ye sacred Nurseries of blooming Youth!"	Miscellaneous Sonnets	1820
Oxford, May 30, 1820 (2)	1820		"Shame on this faithless heart! that could allow"	Miscellaneous Sonnets	1820
June 1820	1820		"Fame tells of groves—from England far away—"	Miscellaneous Sonnets	1820
Dedication (I)	1821–1822		"Dear Fellow-travellers! think not that the Muse,"	Memorials of a Tour on the Continent, 1820	1822
Fish-women—On Landing at Calais (II)	1821–1822		"'Tis said, fantastic ocean doth enfold"	Memorials of a Tour on the Continent, 1820	1822
Bruges (III)	1821–1822		"Brugès I saw attired with golden light"	Memorials of a Tour on the Continent, 1820	1822
Bruges (IV)	1821–1822		"The Spirit of Antiquity—enshrined"	Memorials of a Tour on the Continent, 1820	1822
After visiting the Field of Waterloo (V)	1821–1822		"A wingèd Goddess—clothed in vesture wrought"	Memorials of a Tour on the Continent, 1820	1822
Between Namur and Liege (VI)	1821–1822		"What lovelier home could gentle Fancy choose?"	Memorials of a Tour on the Continent, 1820	1822
Aix-la-Chapelle (VII)	1821–1822		"Was it to disenchant, and to undo,"	Memorials of a Tour on the Continent, 1820	1822
In the Cathedral at Cologne (VIII)	1821–1822		"O for the help of Angels to complete"	Memorials of a Tour on the Continent, 1820	1822
In a Carriage, upon the Banks of the Rhine (IX)	1821–1822		"Amid this dance of objects sadness steals"	Memorials of a Tour on the Continent, 1820	1822
Hymn for the Boatmen, as they approach the Rapids under the Castle of Heidelberg (X)	1821–1822		"Jesu! bless our slender Boat,"	Memorials of a Tour on the Continent, 1820	1822
The Source of the Danube (XI)	1821–1822		"Not, like his great Compeers, indignantly"	Memorials of a Tour on the Continent, 1820	1822
On approaching the Staub-bach, Lauterbrunnen (XII)	1821–1822		"Uttered by whom, or how inspired—designed"	Memorials of a Tour on the Continent, 1820	1822
The Fall of the Aar—Handec (XIII)	1821–1822		"From the fierce aspect of this River, throwing"	Memorials of a Tour on the Continent, 1820	1822
Memorial, near the Outlet of the Lake of Thun (XIV)	1821–1822		"Around a wild and woody hill"	Memorials of a Tour on the Continent, 1820	1822
Composed in one of the Catholic Cantons (XV)	1821–1822		"Doomed as we are our native dust"	Memorials of a Tour on the Continent, 1820	1822
After-thought (XVI)	1821–1822		"Oh Life! without thy chequered scene"	Memorials of a Tour on the Continent, 1820	1822
Scene on the Lake of Brientz (XVII)	1821–1822		"'What know we of the Blest above"	Memorials of a Tour on the Continent, 1820	1822
Engelberg, the Hill of Angels (XVIII)	1821–1822		"For gentlest uses, oft-times Nature takes"	Memorials of a Tour on the Continent, 1820	1822
Our Lady of the Snow (XIX)	1821–1822		"Meek Virgin Mother, more benign"	Memorials of a Tour on the Continent, 1820	1822
Effusion in Presence of the Painted Tower of Tell at Altorf (XX)	1821–1822		"What though the Italian pencil wrought not here,"	Memorials of a Tour on the Continent, 1820	1822
The Tower of Schwytz (XXI)	1821–1822		"By antique Fancy trimmed—though lowly, bred"	Memorials of a Tour on the Continent, 1820	1822
On hearing the "Ranz des Vaches" on the Top of the Pass of St. Gothard (XXII)	1821–1822		"I listen—but no faculty of mine"	Memorials of a Tour on the Continent, 1820	1822
Fort Fuentes (XXIII)	1821–1822		"Dread hour! when, upheaved by war's sulphurous blast,"	Memorials of a Tour on the Continent, 1820	1822
The Church of San Salvador, seen from the Lake of Lugano (XXIV)	1821–1822		"Thou sacred Pile! whose turrets rise"	Memorials of a Tour on the Continent, 1820	1822
The Italian Itinerant, and the Swiss Goatherd—Part I, Part II (XXV)	1821–1822		"Now that the farewell tear is dried,"	Memorials of a Tour on the Continent, 1820	1822
The Last Supper, by Leonardo da Vinci (XXVI)	1821–1822		"Tho' searching damps and many an envious flaw"	Memorials of a Tour on the Continent, 1820	1822
The Eclipse of the Sun, 1820 (XXVII)	1821–1822		"High on her speculative tower"	Memorials of a Tour on the Continent, 1820	1822
The Three Cottage Girls (XXVIII)	1821–1822		"How blest the Maid whose heart—yet free"	Memorials of a Tour on the Continent, 1820	1822
The Column intended by Buonaparte for a Triumphal Edifice in Milan NOW LYING BY THE WAY-SIDE IN THE SIMPLON PASS (XXIX)	1821–1822		"Ambition—following down this far-famed slope"	Memorials of a Tour on the Continent, 1820	1822
Stanzas composed in the Simplon Pass (XXX)	1821–1822		"Vallombrosa! I longed in thy shadiest wood"	Memorials of a Tour on the Continent, 1820	1822
Echo, upon the Gemmi (XXXI)	1821–1822		"What beast of chase hath broken from the cover?"	Memorials of a Tour on the Continent, 1820	1822
Processions. Suggested on a Sabbath Morning in the Vale of Chamouny (XXXII)	1821–1822		"To appease the Gods; or public thanks to yield;"	Memorials of a Tour on the Continent, 1820	1822
Elegiac Stanzas (XXXIII)	1821–1822		"Lulled by the sound of pastoral bells,"	Memorials of a Tour on the Continent, 1820	1822
Sky-Prospect—From the Plain of France (XXXIV)	1821–1822		"Lo! in the burning west, the craggy nape"	Memorials of a Tour on the Continent, 1820	1822
On being Stranded near the Harbour of Boulogne (XXXV)	1821–1822		"Why cast ye back upon the Gallic shore,"	Memorials of a Tour on the Continent, 1820	1822
After landing—the Valley of Dover, November 1820 (XXXVI)	1821–1822		"Where be the noisy followers of the game"	Memorials of a Tour on the Continent, 1820	1822
At Dover (XXXVII)	1821–1822		"From the Pier's head, musing, and with increase"	Memorials of a Tour on the Continent, 1820	1822
Desultory Stanzas, upon receiving the preceding Sheets from the Press (XXXVIII)	1821–1822		"Is then the final page before me spread,"	Memorials of a Tour on the Continent, 1820	1822
To the Rev. Dr. Wordsworth (I)	1820		"The Minstrels played their Christmas tune"	Miscellaneous Sonnets; The River Duddon. A Series of Sonnets	1820
Not envying Latian shades—if yet they throw (II)	1820		"Not envying Latian shades—if yet they throw"	Miscellaneous Sonnets; The River Duddon. A Series of Sonnets	1820
Child of the clouds! remote from every taint (III)	1820		"Child of the clouds! remote from every taint"	Miscellaneous Sonnets; The River Duddon. A Series of Sonnets	1820
How shall I paint thee?--Be this naked stone (IV)	1820		"How shall I paint thee?—Be this naked stone"	Miscellaneous Sonnets; The River Duddon. A Series of Sonnets	1820
Take, cradled Nursling of the mountain, take (V)	1820		"Take, cradled Nursling of the mountain, take"	Miscellaneous Sonnets; The River Duddon. A Series of Sonnets	1820
Sole listener, Duddon! to the breeze that played (VI)	1820		"Sole listener, Duddon! to the breeze that played"	Miscellaneous Sonnets; The River Duddon. A Series of Sonnets	1820
Flowers (VII)	1820		"Ere yet our course was graced with social trees"	Miscellaneous Sonnets; The River Duddon. A Series of Sonnets	1820
Change me, some God, into that breathing rose! (VIII)	1820		"'Change me, some God, into that breathing rose!'"	Miscellaneous Sonnets; The River Duddon. A Series of Sonnets	1820
What aspect bore the Man who roved or fled (IX)	1820		"What aspect bore the Man who roved or fled,"	Miscellaneous Sonnets; The River Duddon. A Series of Sonnets	1820
The Stepping-stones (X)	1820		"The struggling Rill insensibly is grown"	Miscellaneous Sonnets; The River Duddon. A Series of Sonnets	1820
The same Subject [Stepping-Stones] (XI)	1820		"Not so that Pair whose youthful spirits dance"	Miscellaneous Sonnets; The River Duddon. A Series of Sonnets	1820
The Faery Chasm (XII)	1820		"No fiction was it of the antique age:"	Miscellaneous Sonnets; The River Duddon. A Series of Sonnets	1820
Hints for the Fancy (XIII)	1820		"On, loitering Muse—the swift Stream chides us—on!"	Miscellaneous Sonnets; The River Duddon. A Series of Sonnets	1820
Open Prospect (XIV)	1820		"Hail to the fields—with Dwellings sprinkled o'er,"	Miscellaneous Sonnets; The River Duddon. A Series of Sonnets	1820
O mountain Stream! the Shepherd and his Cot (XV)	1820		"O mountain Stream! the Shepherd and his Cot"	Miscellaneous Sonnets; The River Duddon. A Series of Sonnets	1820
From this deep chasm, where quivering sunbeams play (XVI)	1820		"From this deep chasm, where quivering sunbeams play"	Miscellaneous Sonnets; The River Duddon. A Series of Sonnets	1820
American Tradition (XVII)	1820		"Such fruitless questions may not long beguile"	Miscellaneous Sonnets; The River Duddon. A Series of Sonnets	1820
Return (XVIII)	1820		"A dark plume fetch me from yon blasted yew,"	Miscellaneous Sonnets; The River Duddon. A Series of Sonnets	1820
Seathwaite Chapel (XIX)	1820		"Sacred Religion! 'mother of form and fear,'"	Miscellaneous Sonnets; The River Duddon. A Series of Sonnets	1820
Tributary Stream (XX)	1820		"My frame hath often trembled with delight"	Miscellaneous Sonnets; The River Duddon. A Series of Sonnets	1820
The Plain of Donnerdale (XXI)	1820		"The old inventive Poets, had they seen,"	Miscellaneous Sonnets; The River Duddon. A Series of Sonnets	1820
Whence that low voice?--A whisper from the heart (XXII)	1820		"Whence that low voice?—A whisper from the heart,"	Miscellaneous Sonnets; The River Duddon. A Series of Sonnets	1820
Tradition (XXIII)	1820		"A love-lorn Maid, at some far-distant time,"	Miscellaneous Sonnets; The River Duddon. A Series of Sonnets	1820
Sheep-washing (XXIV)	1820		"Sad thoughts, avaunt!—partake we their blithe cheer"	Miscellaneous Sonnets; The River Duddon. A Series of Sonnets	1820
The Resting-place (XXV)	1820		"Mid-noon is past;—upon the sultry mead"	Miscellaneous Sonnets; The River Duddon. A Series of Sonnets	1820
Methinks 'twere no unprecedented feat (XXVI)	1820		"Methinks 'twere no unprecedented feat"	Miscellaneous Sonnets; The River Duddon. A Series of Sonnets	1820
Return, Content! for fondly I pursued (XXVII)	1820		"Return, Content! for fondly I pursued,"	Miscellaneous Sonnets; The River Duddon. A Series of Sonnets	1820
Fallen, and diffused into a shapeless heap (XXVIII)	1820		"Fallen, and diffused into a shapeless heap,"	Miscellaneous Sonnets; The River Duddon. A Series of Sonnets	1820
Journey renewed (XXIX)	1820		"I rose while yet the cattle, heat-opprest,"	Miscellaneous Sonnets; The River Duddon. A Series of Sonnets	1820
No record tells of lance opposed to lance (XXX)	1820		"No record tells of lance opposed to lance,"	Miscellaneous Sonnets; The River Duddon. A Series of Sonnets	1820
Who swerves from innocence, who makes divorce (XXXI)	1820		"Who swerves from innocence, who makes divorce"	Miscellaneous Sonnets; The River Duddon. A Series of Sonnets	1820
The Kirk of Ulpha to the pilgrim's eye (XXXII)	1820		"The Kirk of Ulpha to the pilgrim's eye"	Miscellaneous Sonnets; The River Duddon. A Series of Sonnets	1820
Not hurled precipitous from steep to steep (XXXIII)	1820		"Not hurled precipitous from steep to steep;"	Miscellaneous Sonnets; The River Duddon. A Series of Sonnets	1820
Conclusion (XXXIV)	1820		"But here no cannon thunders to the gale;"	Miscellaneous Sonnets; The River Duddon. A Series of Sonnets	1820
After-thought (XXXV)	1820		"I thought of Thee, my partner and my guide,"	Miscellaneous Sonnets; The River Duddon. A Series of Sonnets	1820
A Parsonage in Oxfordshire	1820		"Where holy ground begins, unhallowed ends,"	Miscellaneous Sonnets	1822
To Enterprise	1820		"Keep for the Young the impassioned smile"	Poems of the Imagination	1822
Introduction (I)	1821		"I, who accompanied with faithful pace"	Ecclesiastical Sonnets. In Series Part I.--From the Introduction of Christianity into Britain to the Consummation of the Papal Dominion	1822
Conjectuers (II)	1821		"If there be prophets on whose spirits rest"	Ecclesiastical Sonnets. In Series Part I.--From the Introduction of Christianity into Britain to the Consummation of the Papal Dominion	1822
Trepidation of the Druids (III)	1821		"Screams round the Arch-druid's brow the seamew - white"	Ecclesiastical Sonnets. In Series Part I.--From the Introduction of Christianity into Britain to the Consummation of the Papal Dominion	1822
Druidical Excommunication (IV)	1821		"Mercy and Love have met thee on thy road,"	Ecclesiastical Sonnets. In Series Part I.--From the Introduction of Christianity into Britain to the Consummation of the Papal Dominion	1822
Uncertainty (V)	1821		"Darkness surrounds us: seeking, we are lost"	Ecclesiastical Sonnets. In Series Part I.--From the Introduction of Christianity into Britain to the Consummation of the Papal Dominion	1822
Persecution (VI)	1821		"Lament! for Diocletian's fiery sword"	Ecclesiastical Sonnets. In Series Part I.--From the Introduction of Christianity into Britain to the Consummation of the Papal Dominion	1822
Recovery (VII)	1821		"As, when a storm hath ceased, the birds regain"	Ecclesiastical Sonnets. In Series Part I.--From the Introduction of Christianity into Britain to the Consummation of the Papal Dominion	1822
Temptations from Roman Refinements (VIII)	1821		"Watch, and be firm! for, soul-subduing vice,"	Ecclesiastical Sonnets. In Series Part I.--From the Introduction of Christianity into Britain to the Consummation of the Papal Dominion	1822
Dissensions (IX)	1821		"That heresies should strike (if truth be scanned"	Ecclesiastical Sonnets. In Series Part I.--From the Introduction of Christianity into Britain to the Consummation of the Papal Dominion	1822
Struggle of the Britons against the Barbarians (X)	1821		"Rise!—they have risen: of brave Aneurin ask"	Ecclesiastical Sonnets. In Series Part I.--From the Introduction of Christianity into Britain to the Consummation of the Papal Dominion	1822
Saxon Conquest (XI)	1821		"Nor wants the cause the panic-striking aid"	Ecclesiastical Sonnets. In Series Part I.--From the Introduction of Christianity into Britain to the Consummation of the Papal Dominion	1822
Monastery of Old Bangor (XII)	1821		"The oppression of the tumult—wrath and scorn—"	Ecclesiastical Sonnets. In Series Part I.--From the Introduction of Christianity into Britain to the Consummation of the Papal Dominion	1822
Recovery (VII)	1821		"A bright-haired company of youthful slaves,"	Ecclesiastical Sonnets. In Series Part I.--From the Introduction of Christianity into Britain to the Consummation of the Papal Dominion	1822
Glad Tidings (XIII)	1821		"For ever hallowed be this morning fair,"	Ecclesiastical Sonnets. In Series Part I.--From the Introduction of Christianity into Britain to the Consummation of the Papal Dominion	1822
Paulinus (XIX)	1821		"But, to remote Northumbria's royal Hall,"	Ecclesiastical Sonnets. In Series Part I.--From the Introduction of Christianity into Britain to the Consummation of the Papal Dominion	1822
Persuasion (XX)	1821		"'Man's life is like a Sparrow, mighty King!"	Ecclesiastical Sonnets. In Series Part I.--From the Introduction of Christianity into Britain to the Consummation of the Papal Dominion	1822
Conversion (XXI)	1821		"Prompt transformation works the novel Lore;"	Ecclesiastical Sonnets. In Series Part I.--From the Introduction of Christianity into Britain to the Consummation of the Papal Dominion	1822
Apology (XXII)	1821		"Nor scorn the aid which Fancy oft doth lend"	Ecclesiastical Sonnets. In Series Part I.--From the Introduction of Christianity into Britain to the Consummation of the Papal Dominion	1822
Primitive Saxon Clergy (XXIII)	1821		"How beautiful your presence, how benign,"	Ecclesiastical Sonnets. In Series Part I.--From the Introduction of Christianity into Britain to the Consummation of the Papal Dominion	1822
Other Influences (XXIV)	1821		"Ah, when the Body, round which in love we clung,"	Ecclesiastical Sonnets. In Series Part I.--From the Introduction of Christianity into Britain to the Consummation of the Papal Dominion	1822
Seclusion (XXV)	1821		"Lance, shield, and sword relinquished—at his side"	Ecclesiastical Sonnets. In Series Part I.--From the Introduction of Christianity into Britain to the Consummation of the Papal Dominion	1822
Continued (XXVI)	1821		"Methinks that to some vacant hermitage"	Ecclesiastical Sonnets. In Series Part I.--From the Introduction of Christianity into Britain to the Consummation of the Papal Dominion	1822
Reproof (XXVII)	1821		"But what if One, through grove or flowery meed,"	Ecclesiastical Sonnets. In Series Part I.--From the Introduction of Christianity into Britain to the Consummation of the Papal Dominion	1822
Saxon Monasteries, and Lights and Shades of the Religion (XXVIII)	1821		"By such examples moved to unbought pains,"	Ecclesiastical Sonnets. In Series Part I.--From the Introduction of Christianity into Britain to the Consummation of the Papal Dominion	1822
Missions and Travels (XXIX)	1821		"Not sedentary all: there are who roam"	Ecclesiastical Sonnets. In Series Part I.--From the Introduction of Christianity into Britain to the Consummation of the Papal Dominion	1822
Alfred (XXX)	1821		"Behold a pupil of the monkish gown,"	Ecclesiastical Sonnets. In Series Part I.--From the Introduction of Christianity into Britain to the Consummation of the Papal Dominion	1822
His Descendants (XXXI)	1821		"When thy great soul was freed from mortal chains,"	Ecclesiastical Sonnets. In Series Part I.--From the Introduction of Christianity into Britain to the Consummation of the Papal Dominion	1822
Influence Abused (XXXII)	1821		"Urged by Ambition, who with subtlest skill"	Ecclesiastical Sonnets. In Series Part I.--From the Introduction of Christianity into Britain to the Consummation of the Papal Dominion	1822
Danish Conquests (XXXIII)	1821		"Woe to the Crown that doth the Cowl obey!"	Ecclesiastical Sonnets. In Series Part I.--From the Introduction of Christianity into Britain to the Consummation of the Papal Dominion	1822
Canute (XXXIV)	1821		"A pleasant music floats along the Mere,"	Ecclesiastical Sonnets. In Series Part I.--From the Introduction of Christianity into Britain to the Consummation of the Papal Dominion	1822
The Norman Conquest (XXXV)	1821		"The woman-hearted Confessor prepares"	Ecclesiastical Sonnets. In Series Part I.--From the Introduction of Christianity into Britain to the Consummation of the Papal Dominion	1822
Coldly we spake. The Saxons, overpowered (XXXVI)	1821		"Coldly we spake. The Saxons, overpowered"	Ecclesiastical Sonnets. In Series Part I.--From the Introduction of Christianity into Britain to the Consummation of the Papal Dominion	1837
The Council of Clermont (XXXVII)	1821		"'And shall,' the Pontiff asks, 'profaneness flow"	Ecclesiastical Sonnets. In Series Part I.--From the Introduction of Christianity into Britain to the Consummation of the Papal Dominion	1822
Crusades (XXXVIII)	1821		"The turbaned Race are poured in thickening swarms "	Ecclesiastical Sonnets. In Series Part I.--From the Introduction of Christianity into Britain to the Consummation of the Papal Dominion	1822
Richard I (XXXIX)	1821		"Redoubted King, of courage leonine,"	Ecclesiastical Sonnets. In Series Part I.--From the Introduction of Christianity into Britain to the Consummation of the Papal Dominion	1822
An Interdict (XL)	1821		"Realms quake by turns: proud Arbitress of grace,"	Ecclesiastical Sonnets. In Series Part I.--From the Introduction of Christianity into Britain to the Consummation of the Papal Dominion	1822
Papal Abuses (XLI)	1821		"As with the Stream our voyage we pursue,"	Ecclesiastical Sonnets. In Series Part I.--From the Introduction of Christianity into Britain to the Consummation of the Papal Dominion	1822
Scene in Venice (XLII)	1821		"Black Demons hovering o'er his mitred head,"	Ecclesiastical Sonnets. In Series Part I.--From the Introduction of Christianity into Britain to the Consummation of the Papal Dominion	1822
Papal Dominion (XLIII)	1821		"Unless to Peter's Chair the viewless wind"	Ecclesiastical Sonnets. In Series Part I.--From the Introduction of Christianity into Britain to the Consummation of the Papal Dominion	1822
How soon—alas! did Man, created pure-- (I)	1821		"How soon—alas! did Man, created pure—"	Ecclesiastical Sonnets. In Series Part II.--To the close of the Troubles in the Reign of Charles I	1845
From false assumption rose, and, fondly hailed (II)	1821		"From false assumption rose, and fondly hail'd"	Ecclesiastical Sonnets. In Series Part II.--To the close of the Troubles in the Reign of Charles I	1845
Cistertian Monastery (III)	1821		"'Here Man more purely lives, less oft doth fall,"	Ecclesiastical Sonnets. In Series Part II.--To the close of the Troubles in the Reign of Charles I	1822
Deplorable his lot who tills the ground (IV)	1821		"Deplorable his lot who tills the ground,"	Ecclesiastical Sonnets. In Series Part II.--To the close of the Troubles in the Reign of Charles I	1835
Monks and Schoolmen (V)	1821		"Record we too, with just and faithful pen,"	Ecclesiastical Sonnets. In Series Part II.--To the close of the Troubles in the Reign of Charles I	1822
Other Benefits (VI)	1821		"And, not in vain embodied to the sight,"	Ecclesiastical Sonnets. In Series Part II.--To the close of the Troubles in the Reign of Charles I	1822
Continued (VII)	1821		"And what melodious sounds at times prevail!"	Ecclesiastical Sonnets. In Series Part II.--To the close of the Troubles in the Reign of Charles I	1822
Crusaders (VIII)	1821		"Furl we the sails, and pass with tardy oars"	Ecclesiastical Sonnets. In Series Part II.--To the close of the Troubles in the Reign of Charles I	1822
As faith thus sanctified the warrior's crest (IX)	1842		"As faith thus sanctified the warrior's crest"	Ecclesiastical Sonnets. In Series Part II.--To the close of the Troubles in the Reign of Charles I	1845
Where long and deeply hath been fixed the root (X)	1842		"Where long and deeply hath been fixed the root"	Ecclesiastical Sonnets. In Series Part II.--To the close of the Troubles in the Reign of Charles I	1845
Transubstantiation (XI)	1821		"Enough! for see, with dim association"	Ecclesiastical Sonnets. In Series Part II.--To the close of the Troubles in the Reign of Charles I	1822
The Vaudois (XII)	1821		"But whence came they who for the Saviour Lord"	Ecclesiastical Sonnets. In Series Part II.--To the close of the Troubles in the Reign of Charles I	1822
Praised be the Rivers, from their mountain springs (XIII)	1821		"Praised be the Rivers, from their mountain springs"	Ecclesiastical Sonnets. In Series Part II.--To the close of the Troubles in the Reign of Charles I	1835
Waldenses (XIV)	1821		"Those had given earliest notice, as the lark"	Ecclesiastical Sonnets. In Series Part II.--To the close of the Troubles in the Reign of Charles I	1822
Archbishop Chichely to Henry V. (XV)	1821		"'What beast in wilderness or cultured field"	Ecclesiastical Sonnets. In Series Part II.--To the close of the Troubles in the Reign of Charles I	1822
Wars of York and Lancaster (XVI)	1821		"Thus is the storm abated by the craft"	Ecclesiastical Sonnets. In Series Part II.--To the close of the Troubles in the Reign of Charles I	1822
Wicliffe (XVII)	1821		"Once more the Church is seized with sudden fear,"	Ecclesiastical Sonnets. In Series Part II.--To the close of the Troubles in the Reign of Charles I	1822
Corruptions of the higher Clergy (XVIII)	1821		"'Woe to you, Prelates! rioting in ease"	Ecclesiastical Sonnets. In Series Part II.--To the close of the Troubles in the Reign of Charles I	1822
Abuse of Monastic Power (XIX)	1821		"And what is Penance with her knotted thong;"	Ecclesiastical Sonnets. In Series Part II.--To the close of the Troubles in the Reign of Charles I	1822
Monastic Voluptuousness (XX)	1821		"Yet more,—round many a Convent's blazing fire"	Ecclesiastical Sonnets. In Series Part II.--To the close of the Troubles in the Reign of Charles I	1822
Dissolution of the Monasteries (XXI)	1821		"Threats come which no submission may assuage,"	Ecclesiastical Sonnets. In Series Part II.--To the close of the Troubles in the Reign of Charles I	1822
The same Subject (XXII)	1821		"The lovely Nun (submissive, but more meek"	Ecclesiastical Sonnets. In Series Part II.--To the close of the Troubles in the Reign of Charles I	1822
Continued (XXIII)	1821		"Yet many a Novice of the cloistral shade,"	Ecclesiastical Sonnets. In Series Part II.--To the close of the Troubles in the Reign of Charles I	1822
Saints (XXIV)	1821		"Ye, too, must fly before a chasing hand,"	Ecclesiastical Sonnets. In Series Part II.--To the close of the Troubles in the Reign of Charles I	1822
The Virgin (XXV)	1821		"Mother! whose virgin bosom was uncrost"	Ecclesiastical Sonnets. In Series Part II.--To the close of the Troubles in the Reign of Charles I	1822
Apology (XXVI)	1821		"Not utterly unworthy to endure"	Ecclesiastical Sonnets. In Series Part II.--To the close of the Troubles in the Reign of Charles I	1822
Imaginative Regrets (XXVII)	1821		"Deep is the lamentation! Not alone"	Ecclesiastical Sonnets. In Series Part II.--To the close of the Troubles in the Reign of Charles I	1822
Reflections (XXVIII)	1821		"Grant, that by this unsparing hurricane"	Ecclesiastical Sonnets. In Series Part II.--To the close of the Troubles in the Reign of Charles I	1822
Translation of the Bible (XXIX)	1821		"But, to outweigh all harm, the sacred Book,"	Ecclesiastical Sonnets. In Series Part II.--To the close of the Troubles in the Reign of Charles I	1822
The Point at Issue (XXX)	1821		"For what contend the wise?—for nothing less"	Ecclesiastical Sonnets. In Series Part II.--To the close of the Troubles in the Reign of Charles I	1827
Edward VI. (XXXI)	1821		"'Sweet is the holiness of Youth'—so felt"	Ecclesiastical Sonnets. In Series Part II.--To the close of the Troubles in the Reign of Charles I	1822
Edward signing the Warrant for the Execution of Joan of Kent (XXXII)	1821		"The tears of man in various measure gush"	Ecclesiastical Sonnets. In Series Part II.--To the close of the Troubles in the Reign of Charles I	1822
Revival of Popery (XXXIII)	1821		"The saintly Youth has ceased to rule, discrowned "	Ecclesiastical Sonnets. In Series Part II.--To the close of the Troubles in the Reign of Charles I	1827
Latimer and Ridley (XXXIV)	1821		"How fast the Marian death-list is unrolled! "	Ecclesiastical Sonnets. In Series Part II.--To the close of the Troubles in the Reign of Charles I	1827
Cranmer (XXXV)	1821		"Outstretching flame-ward his upbraided hand"	Ecclesiastical Sonnets. In Series Part II.--To the close of the Troubles in the Reign of Charles I	1822
General View of the Troubles of the Reformation (XXXVI)	1821		"Aid, glorious Martyrs, from your fields of light, "	Ecclesiastical Sonnets. In Series Part II.--To the close of the Troubles in the Reign of Charles I	1822
English Reformers in Exile (XXXVII)	1821		"Scattering, like birds escaped the fowler's net, "	Ecclesiastical Sonnets. In Series Part II.--To the close of the Troubles in the Reign of Charles I	1822
Elizabeth (XXXVIII)	1821		"Hail, Virgin Queen! o'er many an envious bar "	Ecclesiastical Sonnets. In Series Part II.--To the close of the Troubles in the Reign of Charles I	1822
Eminent Reformers (XXXIX)	1821		"Methinks that I could trip o'er heaviest soil, "	Ecclesiastical Sonnets. In Series Part II.--To the close of the Troubles in the Reign of Charles I	1822
The Same (XL)	1821		"Holy and heavenly Spirits as they are, "	Ecclesiastical Sonnets. In Series Part II.--To the close of the Troubles in the Reign of Charles I	1822
Distractions (XLI)	1821		"Men, who have ceased to reverence, soon defy "	Ecclesiastical Sonnets. In Series Part II.--To the close of the Troubles in the Reign of Charles I	1822
Gunpowder Plot (XLII)	1821		"Fear hath a hundred eyes that all agree "	Ecclesiastical Sonnets. In Series Part II.--To the close of the Troubles in the Reign of Charles I	1822
Illustration. The Jung-Frau and the Fall of the Rhine near Schaffhausen (XLIII)	1821		"The Virgin Mountain, wearing like a Queen"	Ecclesiastical Sonnets. In Series Part II.--To the close of the Troubles in the Reign of Charles I	1822
Troubles of Charles the First (XLIV)	1821		"Even such the contrast that, where'er we move,"	Ecclesiastical Sonnets. In Series Part II.--To the close of the Troubles in the Reign of Charles I	1822
Laud (XLV)	1821		"Prejudged by foes determined not to spare,"	Ecclesiastical Sonnets. In Series Part II.--To the close of the Troubles in the Reign of Charles I	1822
Afflictions of England (XLVI)	1821		"Harp! could'st thou venture, on thy boldest string,"	Ecclesiastical Sonnets. In Series Part II.--To the close of the Troubles in the Reign of Charles I	1822
I saw the figure of a lovely Maid (I)	1821		"I saw the figure of a lovely Maid"	Ecclesiastical Sonnets. In Series Part III.--From the Restoration to the Present Times	1822
Patriotic Sympathies (II)	1821		"Last night, without a voice, that Vision spake"	Ecclesiastical Sonnets. In Series Part III.--From the Restoration to the Present Times	1822
Charles the Second (III)	1821		"Who comes—with rapture greeted, and caress'd"	Ecclesiastical Sonnets. In Series Part III.--From the Restoration to the Present Times	1822
Latitudinarianism (IV)	1821		"Yet Truth is keenly sought for, and the wind"	Ecclesiastical Sonnets. In Series Part III.--From the Restoration to the Present Times	1822
Walton's Book of Lives (V)	1821		"There are no colours in the fairest sky"	Ecclesiastical Sonnets. In Series Part III.--From the Restoration to the Present Times	1822
Clerical Integrity (VI)	1821		"Nor shall the eternal roll of praise reject"	Ecclesiastical Sonnets. In Series Part III.--From the Restoration to the Present Times	1822
Persecution of the Scottish Covenanters (VII)	1821		"When Alpine Vales threw forth a suppliant cry, "	Ecclesiastical Sonnets. In Series Part III.--From the Restoration to the Present Times	1827
Acquittal of the Bishops (VIII)	1821		"A voice, from long-expecting thousands sent,"	Ecclesiastical Sonnets. In Series Part III.--From the Restoration to the Present Times	1822
William the Third (IX)	1821		"Calm as an under-current, strong to draw"	Ecclesiastical Sonnets. In Series Part III.--From the Restoration to the Present Times	1822
Obligations of Civil to Religious Liberty (X)	1821		"Ungrateful Country, if thou e'er forget"	Ecclesiastical Sonnets. In Series Part III.--From the Restoration to the Present Times	1822
Sacheverel (XI)	1821		"A sudden conflict rises from the swell"	Ecclesiastical Sonnets. In Series Part III.--From the Restoration to the Present Times	1827
Down a swift Stream, thus far, a bold design (XII)	1821		"Down a swift Stream, thus far, a bold design"	Ecclesiastical Sonnets. In Series Part III.--From the Restoration to the Present Times	1827
Aspects of Christianity in America—I. The Pilgrim Fathers (XIII)	1821		"Well worthy to be magnified are they"	Ecclesiastical Sonnets. In Series Part III.--From the Restoration to the Present Times	1845
(II. Continued) (XIV)	1821		"From Rite and Ordinance abused they fled"	Ecclesiastical Sonnets. In Series Part III.--From the Restoration to the Present Times	1845
(III. Concluded.--American Episcopacy) (XV)	1821		"Patriots informed with Apostolic light"	Ecclesiastical Sonnets. In Series Part III.--From the Restoration to the Present Times	1845
Bishops and Priests, blessed are ye, if deep (XVI)	1821		"Bishops and Priests, blessèd are ye, if deep"	Ecclesiastical Sonnets. In Series Part III.--From the Restoration to the Present Times	1845
Places of Worship (XVII)	1821		"As star that shines dependent upon star"	Ecclesiastical Sonnets. In Series Part III.--From the Restoration to the Present Times	1822
Pastoral Character (XVIII)	1821		"A genial hearth, a hospitable board,"	Ecclesiastical Sonnets. In Series Part III.--From the Restoration to the Present Times	1822
The Liturgy (XIX)	1821		"Yes, if the intensities of hope and fear"	Ecclesiastical Sonnets. In Series Part III.--From the Restoration to the Present Times	1822
Baptism (XX)	1821		"Dear be the Church, that, watching o'er the needs"	Ecclesiastical Sonnets. In Series Part III.--From the Restoration to the Present Times	1827
Sponsors (XXI)	1821		"Father! to God himself we cannot give"	Ecclesiastical Sonnets. In Series Part III.--From the Restoration to the Present Times	1832
Catechising (XXII)	1821		"From Little down to Least, in due degree,"	Ecclesiastical Sonnets. In Series Part III.--From the Restoration to the Present Times	1822
Confirmation (XXIII)	1821		"The Young-ones gathered in from hill and dale,"	Ecclesiastical Sonnets. In Series Part III.--From the Restoration to the Present Times	1827
Confirmation continued (XXIV)	1821		"I saw a Mother's eye intensely bent"	Ecclesiastical Sonnets. In Series Part III.--From the Restoration to the Present Times	1822
Sacrament (XXV)	1821		"By chain yet stronger must the Soul be tied:"	Ecclesiastical Sonnets. In Series Part III.--From the Restoration to the Present Times	1822
The Marriage Ceremony (XXVI)	1821		"The Vested Priest before the Altar stands;"	Ecclesiastical Sonnets. In Series Part III.--From the Restoration to the Present Times	1827
Thanksgiving after Childbirth (XXVII)	1842		"Woman! the Power who left his throne on high,"	Ecclesiastical Sonnets. In Series Part III.--From the Restoration to the Present Times	1845
Visitation of the Sick (XXVIII)	1842		"The Sabbath bells renew the inviting peal;"	Ecclesiastical Sonnets. In Series Part III.--From the Restoration to the Present Times	1845
The Commination Service (XXIX)	1821		"Shun not this rite, neglected, yea abhorred,"	Ecclesiastical Sonnets. In Series Part III.--From the Restoration to the Present Times	1845
Forms of Prayer at Sea (XXX)	1821		"To kneeling Worshippers no earthly floor"	Ecclesiastical Sonnets. In Series Part III.--From the Restoration to the Present Times	1845
Funeral Service (XXXI)	1842		"From the Baptismal hour, thro' weal and woe, "	Ecclesiastical Sonnets. In Series Part III.--From the Restoration to the Present Times	1845
Rural Ceremony (XXXII)	1821		"Closing the sacred Book which long has fed"	Ecclesiastical Sonnets. In Series Part III.--From the Restoration to the Present Times	1822
Regrets (XXXIII)	1821		"Would that our scrupulous Sires had dared to leave"	Ecclesiastical Sonnets. In Series Part III.--From the Restoration to the Present Times	1822
Mutability (XXXIV)	1821		"FROM low to high doth dissolution climb,"	Ecclesiastical Sonnets. In Series Part III.--From the Restoration to the Present Times	1822
Old Abbeys (XXXV)	1821		"Monastic Domes! following my downward way,"	Ecclesiastical Sonnets. In Series Part III.--From the Restoration to the Present Times	1822
Emigrant French Clergy (XXXVI)	1821		"Even while I speak, the sacred roofs of France"	Ecclesiastical Sonnets. In Series Part III.--From the Restoration to the Present Times	1827
Congratulation (XXXVII)	1821		"Thus all things lead to Charity, secured"	Ecclesiastical Sonnets. In Series Part III.--From the Restoration to the Present Times	1822
New Churches (XXXVIII)	1821		"But liberty, and triumphs on the Main,"	Ecclesiastical Sonnets. In Series Part III.--From the Restoration to the Present Times	1822
Church to be Erected (XXXIX)	1821		"Be this the chosen site; the virgin sod,"	Ecclesiastical Sonnets. In Series Part III.--From the Restoration to the Present Times	1822
Continued (XL)	1821		"Mine ear has rung, my spirit sunk subdued,"	Ecclesiastical Sonnets. In Series Part III.--From the Restoration to the Present Times	1822
New Churchyard (XLI)	1821		"The encircling ground, in native turf arrayed,"	Ecclesiastical Sonnets. In Series Part III.--From the Restoration to the Present Times	1822
Cathedrals, etc. (XLII)	1821		"Open your gates, ye everlasting Piles!"	Ecclesiastical Sonnets. In Series Part III.--From the Restoration to the Present Times	1822
Inside of King's College Chapel, Cambridge (XLII)	1821		"Tax not the royal Saint with vain expense,"	Ecclesiastical Sonnets. In Series Part III.--From the Restoration to the Present Times	1822
The Same (XLIII)	1821		"What awful pérspective! while from our sight"	Ecclesiastical Sonnets. In Series Part III.--From the Restoration to the Present Times	1822
Continued (XLIV)	1821		"They dreamt not of a perishable home"	Ecclesiastical Sonnets. In Series Part III.--From the Restoration to the Present Times	1822
Ejaculation (XLV)	1821		"Glory to God! and to the Power who came"	Ecclesiastical Sonnets. In Series Part III.--From the Restoration to the Present Times	1822
Conclusion (XLVI)	1821		"Why sleeps the future, as a snake enrolled,"	Ecclesiastical Sonnets. In Series Part III.--From the Restoration to the Present Times	1822
Memory	1823		"A pen--to register; a key--"	Poems of Sentiment and Reflection.	1827
To the Lady Fleming	1822	On seeing the Foundation preparing for the Erection of Rydal Chapel, Westmoreland	"Blest is this Isle—our native Land;"	Poems of Sentiment and Reflection (1827–43); Miscellaneous Poems (1845–)	1827
On the same Occasion [To the Lady Fleming]	1822	Former title: Bore the title of: "To the Lady ——, on seeing the foundation preparing for the erection of —— Chapel, Westmoreland." from 1827–1836.	"Oh! gather whencesoe'er ye safely may"	Poems of Sentiment and Reflection (1827–43); Miscellaneous Poems (1835–)	1827
A volant Tribe of Bards on earth are found	1823		"A volant Tribe of Bards on earth are found,"	Miscellaneous Sonnets	1827
Not Love, not War, nor the tumultuous swell	1823		"Not Love, not War, nor the tumultuous swell"	Miscellaneous Sonnets	1827
To ---- (1)	1824		"Let other bards of angels sing,"	Poems founded on the Affections.	1827
To ------ (2)	1824		"O dearer far than light and life are dear,"	Poems founded on the Affections	1827
How rich that forehead's calm expanse!	1824		"How rich that forehead's calm expanse!"	Poems founded on the Affections	1827
To ------ (3)	1824		"Look at the fate of summer flowers,"	Poems founded on the Affections	1827
A Flower Garden at Coleorton Hall, Leicestershire	1824		"Tell me, ye Zephyrs! that unfold,"	Poems of the Fancy.	1827
To the Lady E. B. and the Hon. Miss P.	1824		"A Stream, to mingle with your favourite Dee,"	Miscellaneous Sonnets	1827
To the Torrent at the Devil's Bridge, North Wales, 1824	1824		"How art thou named? In search of what strange land,"	Miscellaneous Sonnets	1827
Composed among the Ruins of a Castle in North Wales	1824		"Through shattered galleries, 'mid roofless halls,"	Miscellaneous Sonnets	1827
Elegiac Stanzas. Addressed to Sir G. H. B., upon the death of his sister-in-law, 1824	1824	Former title: Bore the title of: "Elegiac Stanzas, 1824" in the 1827 edition.	"O for a dirge! But why complain?"	Epitaphs and Elegiac Poems (1832); Epitaphs and Elegiac Pieces	1827
Cenotaph	1824		"By vain affections unenthralled,"	Epitaphs and Elegiac Pieces.	1842
Epitaph in the Chapel-yard of Langdale, Westmoreland	1841		"By playful smiles, (alas! too oft"	Epitaphs and Elegiac Pieces.	1842
The Contrast. The Parrot and the Wren	1825		"Within her gilded cage confined,"	Poems of the Fancy.	1827
To a Sky-lark	1825		"Up with me! up with me into the clouds!"	Poems of the Imagination	1827
Ere with cold beads of midnight dew	1826		"Ere with cold beads of midnight dew"	Poems founded on the Affections	1827
Ode, composed on May Morning	1826		"While from the purpling east departs"	Poems of Sentiment and Reflection	1835
To May	1826–1834		"Though many suns have risen and set"	Poems of Sentiment and Reflection	1835
Once I could hail (howe'er serene the sky)	1826		"Once I could hail (howe'er serene the sky)"	Epitaphs and Elegiac Poems (1827–42); Miscellaneous Poems (1845–)	1827
The massy Ways, carried across these heights	1826		"The massy Ways, carried across these heights"	Inscriptions	1835
The Pillar of Trajan	1825		"Where towers are crushed, and unforbidden weeds"	Poems of Sentiment and Reflection (1827–42)	1827
On seeing a Needlecase in the Form of a Harp. The work of E. M. S.	1827		"Frowns are on every Muse's face,"	Poems of the Fancy	1827
Dedication. To ------	1827		"Happy the feeling from the bosom thrown"	Miscellaneous Sonnets	1827
Her only pilot the soft breeze, the boat	1827		"Her only pilot the soft breeze, the boat"	Miscellaneous Sonnets	1827
Why, Minstrel, these untuneful murmurings--	1827		"'Why, Minstrel, these untuneful murmurings—"	Miscellaneous Sonnets	1827
To S. H.	1827		"Excuse is needless when with love sincere"	Miscellaneous Sonnets	1827
Decay of Piety	1827		"Oft have I seen, ere Time had ploughed my cheek,"	Miscellaneous Sonnets	1827
Scorn not the Sonnet; Critic, you have frowned,	1827		"Scorn not the Sonnet; Critic, you have frown'd,"	Miscellaneous Sonnets	1827
Fair Prime of life! were it enough to gild	1827		"Fair Prime of life! were it enough to gild "	Miscellaneous Sonnets	1827
Retirement	1827		"If the whole weight of what we think and feel, "	Miscellaneous Sonnets	1827
There is a pleasure in poetic pains	1827		"There is a pleasure in poetic pains"	Miscellaneous Sonnets	1827
Recollection of the Portrait of King Henry Eighth, Trinity Lodge, Cambridge	1827		"The imperial Stature, the colossal stride,"	Miscellaneous Sonnets	1827
When Philoctetes in the Lemnian isle	1827		"When Philoctetes in the Lemnian isle"	Miscellaneous Sonnets	1827
While Anna's peers and early playmates tread	1827		"While Anna's peers and early playmates tread,"	Miscellaneous Sonnets	1827
To the Cuckoo	1827		"Not the whole warbling grove in concert heard"	Miscellaneous Sonnets	1827
The Infant M------ M------	1827		"Unquiet Childhood here by special grace"	Miscellaneous Sonnets	1827
To Rotha Q------	1827		"Rotha, my Spiritual Child! this head was grey"	No class assigned	1827
To ------, in her seventieth year	1827		"Such age how beautiful! O Lady bright,"	Miscellaneous Sonnets	1827
In my mind's eye a Temple, like a cloud	1827		"In my mind's eye a Temple, like a cloud"	Miscellaneous Sonnets	1827
Go back to antique ages, if thine eyes	1827		"Go back to antique ages, if thine eyes"	Poems dedicated to National Independence and Liberty.	1827
In the Woods of Rydal	1827		"Wild Redbreast! hadst them at Jemima's lip"	Miscellaneous Sonnets	1827
Conclusion, To ------	1827		"If these brief Records, by the Muses' art"	Miscellaneous Sonnets	1827
A Morning Exercise	1828		"Fancy, who leads the pastimes of the glad,"	Poems of the Fancy	1832
The Triad	1829		"Show me the noblest Youth of present time,"	Poems of the Imagination.	1829
The Wishing-Gate Destroyed	1828		"'Tis gone—with old belief and dream"	Poems of the Imagination.	1842
On the Power of Sound	1828		"Thy functions are ethereal,"	Poems of the Imagination	1835
Incident at Bruges	1828		"In Brugès town is many a street"	Memorials of a Tour on the Continent.	1835
Gold and Silver Fishes in a Vase	1829		"The soaring lark is blest as proud"	Miscellaneous Sonnets	1835
Liberty [sequel to Gold and Silver ...]	1829	[Addressed to a friend; the gold and silver fishes having been removed to a pool in the pleasure-ground of rydal mount.]	"Those breathing Tokens of your kind regard,"	Miscellaneous Sonnets	1835
Humanity	1829		"What though the Accused, upon his own appeal"	Poems of Sentiment and Reflection	1835
This Lawn, a carpet all alive	1829		"This Lawn, a carpet all alive"	Poems of Sentiment and Reflection	1835
Thought on the Seasons	1829		"Flattered with promise of escape"	Poems of Sentiment and Reflection	1835
A Gravestone upon the Floor in the Cloisters of Worcester Cathedral	1828		"'Miserrimus!' and neither name nor date,"	Miscellaneous Sonnets	1829
The Gleaner (Suggested by a Picture)	1828		"That happy gleam of vernal eyes,"	Poems of Sentiment and Reflection (1832); Miscellaneous Poems(1845)	1829
A Tradition of Oker Hill in Darley Dale, Derbyshire	1829		"'Tis said that to the brow of yon fair hill"	Miscellaneous Sonnets	1829

== 1830–1839 ==
Title	Composition date	Subtitle or former titles	Index of first lines	Classed as (by Wordsworth)	Publication date
The Armenian Lady's Love	1830		"You have heard 'a Spanish Lady'"	Poems founded on the Affections.	1835
The Russian Fugitive	1830		"Enough of rose-bud lips, and eyes"	Miscellaneous Poems.	1835
The Egyptian Maid; or, The Romance of the Water Lily	1830		"While Merlin paced the Cornish sands,"	Distinct place on own (1835 and 1837); Memorials of a Tour in Italy, 1837 (1845–)	1835
The Poet and the Caged Turtledove	1830		"As often as I murmur here"	Poems of the Fancy.	1835
Presentiments	1830		"Presentiments! they judge not right"	Poems of the Imagination	1835
In these fair vales hath many a Tree	1830		"In these fair vales hath many a Tree"	Inscriptions	1835
Elegiac Musings in the grounds of Coleorton Hall the seat of the late sir g.h. beaumont, bart.	1830		"With copious eulogy in prose or rhyme"	Epitaphs and Elegiac Pieces	1835
Chatsworth! thy stately mansion, and the pride	1830		"Chatsworth! thy stately mansion, and the pride"	Miscellaneous Sonnets	1835
To the Author's Portrait	1832		"Go, faithful Portrait! and where long hath knelt"	Miscellaneous Sonnets	1835
The Primrose of the Rock	1831		"A Rock there is whose homely front"	Poems of the Imagination	1835
Yarrow Revisited	1831	Composed (two excepted) during a tour in Scotland, and on the English border, in the autumn of 1831.	"The gallant Youth, who may have gained,"	Yarrow Revisited, and other Poems	1835
On the Departure of Sir Walter Scott from Abbotsford, for Naples	1831		"A trouble, not of clouds, or weeping rain,"	Yarrow Revisited, and other Poems	1835
A Place of Burial in the South of Scotland	1831		"Part fenced by man, part by a rugged steep"	Yarrow Revisited, and other Poems	1835
On the Sight of a Manse in the South of Scotland	1831		"Say, ye far-travelled clouds, far-seeing hills—"	Yarrow Revisited, and other Poems	1835
Composed in Roslin Chapel during a Storm	1831		"The wind is now thy organist;—a clank"	Yarrow Revisited, and other Poems	1835
The Trosachs	1831		"There's not a nook within this solemn Pass,"	Yarrow Revisited, and other Poems	1835
The pibroch's note, discountenanced or mute	1831		"The pibroch's note, discountenanced or mute;"	Yarrow Revisited, and other Poems	1835
Composed after reading a Newspaper of the Day	1831		"People! your chains are severing link by link;"	Yarrow Revisited, and other Poems	1835
Composed in the Glen of Loch Etive	1831		"This Land of Rainbows spanning glens whose walls,"	Yarrow Revisited, and other Poems	1835
Eagles. Composed at Dunollie Castle in the Bay of Oban	1831		"Dishonoured Rock and Ruin! that, by law"	Yarrow Revisited, and other Poems	1835
In the Sound of Mull	1831		"Tradition, be thou mute! Oblivion, throw"	Yarrow Revisited, and other Poems	1835
Suggested at Tyndrum in a Storm	1831		"Enough of garlands, of the Arcadian crook,"	Yarrow Revisited, and other Poems	1835
The Earl of Breadalbane's Ruined Mansion and Family Burial-place, near Killin	1831		"Well sang the Bard who called the grave, in strains"	Yarrow Revisited, and other Poems	1835
Rest and be Thankful! At the Head of Glencroe	1831		"Doubling and doubling with laborious walk,"	Yarrow Revisited, and other Poems	1835
Highland Hut	1831		"See what gay wild flowers deck this earth-built Cot,"	Yarrow Revisited, and other Poems	1835
The Brownie	1831		"'How disappeared he?' Ask the newt and toad;"	Yarrow Revisited, and other Poems	1835
To the Planet Venus, an Evening Star. Composed at Loch Lomond	1831		"Though joy attend Thee orient at the birth"	Yarrow Revisited, and other Poems	1835
Bothwell Castle. (Passed unseen on account of stormy weather)	1831		"Immured in Bothwell's Towers, at times the Brave"	Yarrow Revisited, and other Poems	1835
Picture of Daniel in the Lions' Den, at Hamilton Palace	1831		"Amid a fertile region green with wood"	Yarrow Revisited, and other Poems	1835
The Avon. A Feeder of the Annan	1831		"Avon—a precious, an immortal name!"	Yarrow Revisited, and other Poems	1835
Suggested by a View from an Eminence in Inglewood Forest	1831		"The forest huge of ancient Caledon"	Yarrow Revisited, and other Poems	1835
Hart's-horn Tree, near Penrith	1831		"Here stood an Oak, that long had borne affixed"	Yarrow Revisited, and other Poems	1835
Fancy and Tradition	1831		"The Lovers took within this ancient grove"	Yarrow Revisited, and other Poems	1835
Countess's Pillar	1831		"While the Poor gather round, till the end of time"	Yarrow Revisited, and other Poems	1835
Roman Antiquities. (From the Roman Station at Old Penrith)	1831		"How profitless the relics that we cull,"	Yarrow Revisited, and other Poems	1835
Apology for the foregoing Poems	1831		"No more: the end is sudden and abrupt,"	Yarrow Revisited, and other Poems	1835
The Highland Broach	1831		"If to Tradition faith be due,"	Yarrow Revisited, and other Poems	1835
Devotional Incitements	1832		"Where will they stop, those breathing Powers,"	Poems of the Imagination	1835
Calm is the fragrant air, and loth to lose	1832		"Calm is the fragrant air, and loth to lose"	Evening Voluntaries.	1835
Rural Illusions	1832		"Sylph was it? or a Bird more bright"	Poems of the Fancy	1835
Loving and Liking. Irregular Verses addressed to a Child. (By my Sister)	1832		"There's more in words than I can teach:"	Poems founded on the Affections	1835
Upon the late General Fast. March 1832	1832		"Reluctant call it was; the rite delayed;"	onnets dedicated to Liberty and Order	1835
Filial Piety	1829		"Untouched through all severity of cold;"	Miscellaneous Sonnets	1832
To B. R. Haydon on seeing his picture of Napoleon Bonaparte on the island of St. Helena.	1831		"Haydon! let worthier judges praise the skill"	No class assigned	1832
If thou indeed derive thy light from Heaven	Unknown		"If thou indeed derive thy light from Heaven,"	No class assigned	1827
A Wren's Nest	1833		"Among the dwellings framed by birds"	Poems of the Fancy.	1835
To ------, on the birth of her First-born Child, March 1833	1833		"Like a shipwreck'd Sailor tost"	Poems of Sentiment and Reflection	1835
The Warning. A Sequel to the foregoing [Birth of her First Child]	1833		"List, the winds of March are blowing;"	Poems of Sentiment and Reflection	1835
If this great world of joy and pain	1833		"If this great world of joy and pain"	Poems of Sentiment and Reflection	1835
On a high part of the coast of Cumberland, Easter Sunday, April 7, the Author's sixty-third Birthday	1833		"The Sun, that seemed so mildly to retire,"	Evening Voluntaries	1835
By the Seaside	1833		"The sun is couched, the sea-fowl gone to rest,"	Evening Voluntaries	1835
Adieu, Rydalian Laurels! that have grown	1833		"Adieu, Rydalian Laurels! that have grown"	Poems Composed or Suggested during a Tour in the Summer of 1833	1835
Why should the Enthusiast, journeying through this Isle	1833		"Why should the Enthusiast, journeying through this Isle,"	Poems Composed or Suggested during a Tour in the Summer of 1833	1835
They called Thee MERRY ENGLAND, in old time	1833		"They called Thee Merry England, in old time;"	Poems Composed or Suggested during a Tour in the Summer of 1833	1835
To the River Greta, near Keswick	1833		"Greta, what fearful listening! when huge stones"	Poems Composed or Suggested during a Tour in the Summer of 1833	1835
To the River Derwent	1833		"Among the mountains were we nursed, loved Stream!"	Miscellaneous Sonnets. (1820–1832); Poems Composed or Suggested during a Tour in the Summer of 1833	1835
In sight of the Town of Cockermouth. (Where the Author was born, and his Father's remains are laid)	1833		"A point of life between my Parents' dust,"	Poems Composed or Suggested during a Tour in the Summer of 1833	1835
Address from the Spirit of Cockermouth Castle	1833		"Thou look'st upon me, and dost fondly think,"	Poems Composed or Suggested during a Tour in the Summer of 1833	1835
Nun's Well, Brigham	1833		"The cattle crowding round this beverage clear"	Poems Composed or Suggested during a Tour in the Summer of 1833	1835
To a Friend. (On the Banks of the Derwent)	1833		"Pastor and Patriot!—at whose bidding rise"	Poems Composed or Suggested during a Tour in the Summer of 1833	1835
Mary Queen of Scots. (Landing at the Mouth of the Derwent, Workington)	1833		"Dear to the Loves, and to the Graces vowed,"	Poems Composed or Suggested during a Tour in the Summer of 1833	1835
Stanzas suggested in a Steamboat off St. Bees' Head, on the coast of Cumberland	1833		"If Life were slumber on a bed of down,"	Poems Composed or Suggested during a Tour in the Summer of 1833	1835
In the Channel, between the coast of Cumberland and the Isle of Man	1833		"Ranging the heights of Scawfell or Black-Comb"	Poems Composed or Suggested during a Tour in the Summer of 1833	1835
At Sea off the Isle of Man	1833		"Bold words affirmed, in days when faith was strong"	Poems Composed or Suggested during a Tour in the Summer of 1833	1835
Desire we past illusions to recall?	1833		"Desire we past illusions to recal?"	Poems Composed or Suggested during a Tour in the Summer of 1833	1835
On entering Douglas Bay, Isle of Man	1833		"The feudal Keep, the bastions of Cohorn"	Poems Composed or Suggested during a Tour in the Summer of 1833	1835
By the Seashore, Isle of Man	1833		"Why stand we gazing on the sparkling Brine,"	Poems Composed or Suggested during a Tour in the Summer of 1833	1835
Isle of Man	1833		"A youth too certain of his power to wade"	Poems Composed or Suggested during a Tour in the Summer of 1833	1835
Isle of Man	1833		"Did pangs of grief for lenient time too keen,"	Poems Composed or Suggested during a Tour in the Summer of 1833	1835
By a Retired Mariner, H. H. (A Friend of the Author)	1833		"From early youth I ploughed the restless Main,"	Poems Composed or Suggested during a Tour in the Summer of 1833	1835
At Bala-Sala, Isle of Man (supposed to be written by a friend)	1833		"Broken in fortune, but in mind entire"	Poems Composed or Suggested during a Tour in the Summer of 1833	1835
Tynwald Hill	1833		"Once on the top of Tynwald's formal mound"	Poems Composed or Suggested during a Tour in the Summer of 1833	1835
Despond who will--'I' heard a voice exclaim	1833		"Despond who will—I heard a voice exclaim,"	Poems Composed or Suggested during a Tour in the Summer of 1833	1835
In the Frith of Clyde, Ailsa Crag. During an Eclipse of the Sun, July 17	1833		"Since risen from ocean, ocean to defy,"	Poems Composed or Suggested during a Tour in the Summer of 1833	1835
On the Frith of Clyde. (In a Steamboat)	1833		"Arran! a single-crested Teneriffe,"	Poems Composed or Suggested during a Tour in the Summer of 1833	1835
On revisiting Dunolly Castle	1833		"The captive Bird was gone;—to cliff or moor"	Poems Composed or Suggested during a Tour in the Summer of 1833	1835
The Dunolly Eagle	1833		"Not to the clouds, not to the cliff, he flew;"	Poems Composed or Suggested during a Tour in the Summer of 1833	1835
Written in a Blank Leaf of Macpherson's "Ossian"	1833		"Oft have I caught, upon a fitful breeze"	Poems Composed or Suggested during a Tour in the Summer of 1833	1835
Cave of Staffa	1833		"We saw, but surely, in the motley crowd,"'	Poems Composed or Suggested during a Tour in the Summer of 1833	1835
Cave of Staffa. After the Crowd had departed	1833		"Thanks for the lessons of this Spot—fit school"	Poems Composed or Suggested during a Tour in the Summer of 1833	1835
Cave of Staffa	1833		"Ye shadowy Beings, that have rights and claims"	Poems Composed or Suggested during a Tour in the Summer of 1833	1835
Flowers on the Top of the Pillars at the Entrance of the Cave	1833		"Hope smiled when your nativity was cast,"	Poems Composed or Suggested during a Tour in the Summer of 1833	1835
Iona	1833		"On to Iona!—What can she afford"	Poems Composed or Suggested during a Tour in the Summer of 1833	1835
Iona. (Upon Landing)	1833		"How sad a welcome! To each voyage"	Poems Composed or Suggested during a Tour in the Summer of 1833	1835
The Black Stones of Iona	1833		"Here on their knees men swore; the stones were black"	Poems Composed or Suggested during a Tour in the Summer of 1833	1835
Homeward we turn. Isle of Columba's Cell	1833		"Homeward we turn. Isle of Columba's Cell,"	Poems Composed or Suggested during a Tour in the Summer of 1833	1835
Greenock	1833		"We have not passed into a doleful City, "	Poems Composed or Suggested during a Tour in the Summer of 1833	1835
There! said a Stripling, pointing with meet pride	1833		"'There!' said a Stripling, pointing with meet pride"	Poems Composed or Suggested during a Tour in the Summer of 1833	1835
The River Eden, Cumberland	1833		"Eden! till now thy beauty had I viewed"	Poems Composed or Suggested during a Tour in the Summer of 1833	1835
Monument of Mrs. Howard (by Nollekens) In Wetheral Church, Near Corey, On the Banks of the Eden	1833		"Stretched on the dying Mother's lap, lies dead"	Poems Composed or Suggested during a Tour in the Summer of 1833	1835
Suggested by the foregoing [Mrs. Howard]	1833		"Tranquillity! the sovereign aim wert thou"	Poems Composed or Suggested during a Tour in the Summer of 1833	1835
Nunnery	1833		"The floods are roused, and will not soon be weary;"	Poems Composed or Suggested during a Tour in the Summer of 1833	1835
Steamboats, Viaducts, and Railways	1833		"Motions and Means, on land and sea at war"	Poems Composed or Suggested during a Tour in the Summer of 1833	1835
The Monument commonly called Long Meg and her Daughters, near the River Eden	1821		"A weight of awe, not easy to be borne,":	Poems Composed or Suggested during a Tour in the Summer of 1833	1822
Lowther	1833		"Lowther! in thy majestic Pile are seen"	Poems Composed or Suggested during a Tour in the Summer of 1833	1835
To the Earl of Lonsdale	1833		"Lonsdale! it were unworthy of a Guest,"	Poems Composed or Suggested during a Tour in the Summer of 1833	1835
The Somnambulist	1833		"List, ye who pass by Lyulph's Tower"	Poems Composed or Suggested during a Tour in the Summer of 1833	1835
To Cordelia M----, Hallsteads, Ullswater	1833		"Not in the mines beyond the western main,"	Poems Composed or Suggested during a Tour in the Summer of 1833	1835
Most sweet it is with unuplifted eyes	1833		"Most sweet it is with unuplifted eyes"	Poems Composed or Suggested during a Tour in the Summer of 1833	1835
Composed by the Sea-shore	1834		"What mischief cleaves to unsubdued regret,"	Evening Voluntaries	1835
Not in the lucid intervals of life	1834		"Not in the lucid intervals of life"	Evening Voluntaries	1835
By the Side of Rydal Mere	1834		"The linnet's warble, sinking towards a close,"	Evening Voluntaries	1835
Soft as a cloud is yon blue Ridge—the Mere	1834		"Soft as a cloud is yon blue Ridge—the Mere"	Evening Voluntaries	1835
The leaves that rustled on this oak-crowned hill	1834		"The leaves that rustled on this oak-crowned hill,"	Evening Voluntaries	1835
The Labourer's Noon-day Hymn	1834		"Up to the throne of God is borne"	Poems of Sentiment and Reflection.	1835
The Redbreast. (Suggested in a Westmoreland Cottage)	1834		"Driven in by Autumn's sharpening air"	Poems founded on the Affections.	1835
Lines suggested by a Portrait from the Pencil of F. Stone	1834		"Beguiled into forgetfulness of care"	Poems of Sentiment and Reflection.	1835
The foregoing Subject resumed [Pencil of F. Stone]	1834		"Among a grave fraternity of Monks,"	Poems of Sentiment and Reflection.	1835
To a Child.	1834	Written in her Album	"Small service is true service while it lasts:"	Inscriptions (1837); Miscellaneous Poems. (1842–)	1835
Lines written in the Album of the Countess of Lonsdale. November 5, 1834	1834		"Lady! a Pen (perhaps with thy regard,"	Miscellaneous Poems. (1845–)	1835
To the Moon.	1835	(Composed by the Seaside,--on the Coast of Cumberland)	"Wanderer! that stoop'st so low, and com'st so near"	Evening Voluntaries	1837
To the Moon. (Rydal)	1835		"Queen of the stars!—so gentle, so benign,"	Evening Voluntaries	1837
Written after the Death of Charles Lamb	1835		"To a good Man of most dear memory"	No class assigned	1837
Extempore Effusion upon the death of James Hogg	1835		"When first, descending from the moorlands,"	Epitaphs and Elegiac Pieces (1837)	1835
Upon seeing a coloured Drawing of the Bird of Paradise in an Album	1835		"Who rashly strove thy Image to portray?"	Poems of Sentiment and Reflection	1836
Composed after reading a Newspaper of the Day	1831		"People! your chains are severing link by link;"	Yarrow revisited, and other poems	1835
By a blest Husband guided, Mary came	Unknown		"By a blest Husband guided, Mary came"	Epitaphs and Elegiac Pieces	1835
Desponding Father! mark this altered bough	1835		"Desponding Father! mark this altered bough"	Miscellaneous Sonnets	1835
Roman Antiquities discovered at Bishopstone, Herefordshire	1835		"While poring Antiquarians search the ground"	Miscellaneous Sonnets	1835
St. Catherine of Ledbury	1835		"When human touch (as monkish books attest)"	Miscellaneous Sonnets	1835
Why art thou silent! Is thy love a plant	1835		"WHY art thou silent! Is thy love a plant"	Miscellaneous Sonnets	1835
Four fiery steeds impatient of the rein	1835		"Four fiery steeds impatient of the rein"	Miscellaneous Sonnets	1835
To ------	1835		"“Wait, prithee, wait!” this answer Lesbia threw"	Miscellaneous Sonnets	1835
Said Secrecy to Cowardice and Fraud	1838		"Said Secrecy to Cowardice and Fraud,"	No class assigned	1838
November 1836	1836		"Even so for me a Vision sanctified"	Miscellaneous Sonnets	1837
Six months to six years added he remained	Unknown		"Six months to six years added he remained"	Epitaphs and Elegiac Pieces.	1837
To Henry Crabb Robinson	1837		"Companion! by whose buoyant Spirit cheered,"	Memorials of a Tour in Italy, 1837	1842
Musings near Aquapendente. April 1837 (I)	1837		"Ye Apennines! with all your fertile vales"	Memorials of a Tour in Italy, 1837	1842
The Pine of Monte Mario at Rome (II)	1837		"I saw far off the dark top of a Pine"	Memorials of a Tour in Italy, 1837	1842
At Rome (III)	1837		"Is this, ye Gods, the Capitolian Hill?"	Memorials of a Tour in Italy, 1837	1842
At Rome—Regrets—In allusion to Niebuhr and other modern Historians (IV)	1837		"Those old credulities, to nature dear,"	Memorials of a Tour in Italy, 1837	1842
Continued (V)	1837		"Complacent Fictions were they, yet the same"	Memorials of a Tour in Italy, 1837	1842
Plea for the Historian (VI)	1837		"Forbear to deem the Chronicler unwise,"	Memorials of a Tour in Italy, 1837	1842
At Rome (VII)	1837		"They—who have seen the noble Roman's scorn"	Memorials of a Tour in Italy, 1837	1842
Near Rome, in sight of St. Peter's (VIII)	1837		"Long has the dew been dried on tree and lawn;"	Memorials of a Tour in Italy, 1837	1842
At Albano (IX)	1837		"Days passed—and Monte Calvo would not clear"	Memorials of a Tour in Italy, 1837	1842
Near Anio's stream, I spied a gentle Dove (X)	1837		"Near Anio's stream, I spied a gentle Dove"	Memorials of a Tour in Italy, 1837	1842
From the Alban Hills, looking towards Rome (XI)	1837		"Forgive, illustrious Country! these deep sighs,"	Memorials of a Tour in Italy, 1837	1842
Near the Lake of Thrasymene (XII)	1837		"When here with Carthage Rome to conflict came,"	Memorials of a Tour in Italy, 1837	1842
Near the same Lake (XIII)	1837		"For action born, existing to be tried,"	Memorials of a Tour in Italy, 1837	1842
The Cuckoo at Laverna. (XIV)	1837	May 25, 1837	"List—'twas the Cuckoo.—O with what delight"	Memorials of a Tour in Italy, 1837	1842
At the Convent of Camaldoli (XV)	1837		"Grieve for the Man who hither came bereft,"	Memorials of a Tour in Italy, 1837	1842
Continued (XVI)	1837		"The world forsaken, all its busy cares"	Memorials of a Tour in Italy, 1837	1842
At the Eremite or Upper Convent of Camaldoli (XVII)	1837		"What aim had they, the Pair of Monks, in size"	Memorials of a Tour in Italy, 1837	1842
At Vallombrosa (XVIII)	1837		"Vallombrosa—I longed in thy shadiest wood"	Memorials of a Tour in Italy, 1837	1842
At Florence (XIX)	1837		"Under the shadow of a stately Pile,"	Memorials of a Tour in Italy, 1837	1842
Before the Picture of the Baptist, by Raphael, in the Gallery at Florence (XX)	1837		"The Baptist might have been ordain'd to cry"	Memorials of a Tour in Italy, 1837	1842
At Florence—From Michael Angelo (XXI)	1837		"Rapt above earth by power of one fair face,"	Memorials of a Tour in Italy, 1837	1842
At Florence—From M. Angelo (XXII)	1837		"Eternal Lord! eased of a cumbrous load,"	Memorials of a Tour in Italy, 1837	1842
Among the Ruins of a Convent in the Apennines (XXIII)	1837		"Ye Trees! whose slender roots entwine"	Memorials of a Tour in Italy, 1837	1842
In Lombardy (XXIV)	1837		"See, where his difficult way that Old Man wins"	Memorials of a Tour in Italy, 1837	1842
After leaving Italy (XXV)	1837		"Fair Land! Thee all men greet with joy; how few,"	Memorials of a Tour in Italy, 1837	1842
Continued (XXVI)	1837		"As indignation mastered grief, my tongue"	Memorials of a Tour in Italy, 1837	1842
At Bologna, in Remembrance of the late Insurrections, 1837 (I)	1837		"Ah why deceive ourselves! by no mere fit"	Memorials of a Tour in Italy, 1837 (1842); Sonnets dedicated to Liberty and Order (1845–)	1842
At Bologna, in Remembrance of the late Insurrections, 1837 (Continued) (II)	1837		"Hard task! exclaim the undisciplined, to lean"	Memorials of a Tour in Italy, 1837 (1842); Sonnets dedicated to Liberty and Order (1845–)	1842
At Bologna, in Remembrance of the late Insurrections, 1837 (Concluded) (III)	1837		"As leaves are to the tree whereon they grow"	Memorials of a Tour in Italy, 1837 (1842); Sonnets dedicated to Liberty and Order (1845–)	1842
What if our numbers barely could defy	1837		"What if our numbers barely could defy"	Poems dedicated to National Independence and Liberty	1837
A Night Thought	1837		"Lo! where the Moon along the sky"	Poems chiefly of Early and Late Years (1842)	1837
To the Planet Venus. Upon its approximation (as an Evening Star) to the Earth, January 1838	1838		"What strong allurement draws, what spirit guides,"	Miscellaneous Sonnets	1838
Composed at Rydal on May Morning, 1838	1838, 1 May		"If with old love of you, dear Hills! I share"	Miscellaneous Sonnets	1838
Composed on a May Morning, 1838	1838		"Life with yon Lambs, like day, is just begun,"	Miscellaneous Sonnets	1838
Hark! 'tis the Thrush, undaunted, undeprest	1838		"Hark! 'tis the Thrush, undaunted, undeprest,"	Miscellaneous Sonnets	1838
Tis He whose yester-evening's high disdain	1838		"Tis He whose yester-evening's high disdain"	Miscellaneous Sonnets	1838
Oh what a Wreck! how changed in mien and speech!	1835		"Oh what a Wreck! how changed in mien and speech!"	Miscellaneous Sonnets	1838
A Plea for Authors, May 1838	Unknown		"Failing impartial measure to dispense"	No class assigned	Unknown
A Poet to his Grandchild. (Sequel to the foregoing) [A Plea for Authors.]	Unknown		"Son of my buried Son, while thus thy hand"	No class assigned	1838
Blest Statesman He, whose Mind's unselfish will	1838		"Blest Statesman He, whose Mind's unselfish will"	Sonnets dedicated to Liberty and Order.	1838
Valedictory Sonnet.	1838	Closing the Volume of Sonnets published in 1838	"Serving no haughty Muse, my hands have here"	Miscellaneous Sonnets	1838
Sonnet, "Protest against the Ballot"	1838		Forth rushed, from Envy sprung and Self-conceit,	No class assigned	1838
Suggested by the View of Lancaster Castle (on the Road from the South) (I)	1839		"This Spot—at once unfolding sight so fair"	Sonnets upon the Punishment of Death. In series.	1841
II	1839		"Tenderly do we feel by Nature's law"	Sonnets upon the Punishment of Death. In series.	1841
III	1839		"The Roman Consul doomed his sons to die"	Sonnets upon the Punishment of Death. In series.	1841
IV	1839		"Is Death, when evil against good has fought"	Sonnets upon the Punishment of Death. In series.	1841
V	1839		"Not to the object specially designed,"	Sonnets upon the Punishment of Death. In series.	1841
VI	1839		"Ye brood of conscience—Spectres! that frequent"	Sonnets upon the Punishment of Death. In series.	1841
VII	1839		"Before the world had past her time of youth"	Sonnets upon the Punishment of Death. In series.	1841
VIII	1839		"Fit retribution, by the moral code"	Sonnets upon the Punishment of Death. In series.	1841
IX	1839		"Though to give timely warning and deter"	Sonnets upon the Punishment of Death. In series.	1841
X	1839		"Our bodily life, some plead, that life the shrine"	Sonnets upon the Punishment of Death. In series.	1841
XI	1839		"Ah, think how one compelled for life to abide"	Sonnets upon the Punishment of Death. In series.	1841
XII	1839		"See the Condemned alone within his cell"	Sonnets upon the Punishment of Death. In series.	1841
Conclusion (XIII)	1839		"Yes, though He well may tremble at the sound"	Sonnets upon the Punishment of Death. In series.	1841
Apology (XIV)	1839		"The formal World relaxes her cold chain"	Sonnets upon the Punishment of Death. In series.	1841

== 1840–1849 ==
Title	Composition date	Subtitle or former titles	Index of first lines	Classed as (by Wordsworth)	Publication date
Sonnet on a Portrait of I. F., painted by Margaret Gillies	1840		"We gaze—nor grieve to think that we must die,"	No class assigned	1850
To I.F	1840		"The star which comes at close of day to shine"	No class assigned	1850
Poor Robin	1840		"Now when the primrose makes a splendid show, "	Miscellaneous Poems	1842
On a Portrait of the Duke of Wellington upon the Field of Waterloo, by Haydon	1840, 31 August		"By Art's bold privilege Warrior and War-horse stand"	Poems chiefly of Early and Late Years; Miscellaneous Sonnets	1841
To a Painter	1840		"All praise the Likeness by thy skill portrayed"	Miscellaneous Sonnets	1842
On the same Subject [To a Painter]	1840		"Though I beheld at first with blank surprise"	Miscellaneous Sonnets	1842
When Severn's sweeping flood had overthrown	1842, 23 January		"When Severn's sweeping flood had overthrown"	No class assigned	1842
Intent on gathering wool from hedge and brake	1842, 8 March		"Intent on gathering wool from hedge and brake"	Miscellaneous Sonnets	1842
Prelude, prefixed to the Volume entitled "Poems chiefly of Early and Late Years"	1842, 26 March		"In desultory walk through orchard grounds,"	Miscellaneous Poems	1842
Floating Island	Unknown		"Harmonious Powers with Nature work"	Miscellaneous Poems	1842
The Crescent-moon, the Star of Love	Unknown		"The Crescent-moon, the Star of Love,"	Evening Voluntaries	1842
To a Redbreast--(in Sickness)	Unknown		"Stay, little cheerful Robin! stay,"	Miscellaneous Poems	1842
A Poet!'--He hath put his heart to school	Unknown		". A poet!--He hath put his heart to school,"	Miscellaneous Sonnets	1842
The most alluring clouds that mount the sky	Unknown		"The most alluring clouds that mount the sky"	Miscellaneous Sonnets	1842
Feel for the wrongs to universal ken	Unknown		"Feel for the wrongs to universal ken"	Sonnets dedicated to Liberty and Order	1842
In allusion to various recent Histories and Notices of the French Revolution	Unknown		"Portentous change when History can appear"	Sonnets dedicated to Liberty and Order	1842
In allusion to various recent Histories and Notices of the French Revolution (Continued)	Unknown		"Who ponders National events shall find"	Sonnets dedicated to Liberty and Order	1842
In allusion to various recent Histories and Notices of the French Revolution (Concluded)	Unknown		"Long-favoured England! be not thou misled"	Sonnets dedicated to Liberty and Order	1842
Men of the Western World! in Fate's dark book	Unknown		"Men of the Western World! in Fate's dark book"	Sonnets dedicated to Liberty and Order	1842
Lo! where she stands fixed in a saint-like trance	Unknown		"Lo! where she stands fixed in a saint-like trance,"	Miscellaneous Sonnets	1842
The Norman Boy	Unknown		"High on a broad unfertile tract of forest-skirted Down,"	Poems referring to the Period of Childhood	1842
The Poet's Dream, Sequel to the Norman Boy	Unknown		"Just as those final words were penned, the sun broke out in power,"	Poems referring to the Period of Childhood	1842
The Widow on Windermere Side	Unknown		"How beautiful when up a lofty height"	Poems founded on the Affections	1842
Farewell Lines	1826		"'High bliss is only for a higher state,'"	Poems founded on the Affections.	1842
Airey-Force Valley	Unknown		"—Not a breath of air"	Poems chiefly of Early and Late Years (1842); Poems of the Imagination	1842
Lyre! though such power do in thy magic live	1842		"Lyre! though such power do in thy magic live"	Poems of the Imagination	1842
To the Clouds	Unknown		"Army of Clouds! ye wingèd Host in troops"	Poems chiefly of Early and Late Years (1842); Poems of the Imagination	1842
Wansfell! this Household has a favoured lot	1842		"Wansfell this Household has a favoured lot,"	Miscellaneous Sonnets	1845
The Eagle and the Dove	Unknown		"Shade of Caractacus, if spirits love"	No class assigned	1842
Grace Darling	1842		"Among the dwellers in the silent fields"	No class assigned	1845
While beams of orient light shoot wide and high	1843, 1 January		"While beams of orient light shoot wide and high,"	Miscellaneous Sonnets	1845
To the Rev. Christopher Wordsworth, D.D., Master of Harrow School	1843	After the perusal of his Theophilus Anglicanus, recently published.	"Enlightened Teacher, gladly from thy hand"	Miscellaneous Sonnets	1845
Inscription for a Monument in Crosthwaite Church, in the Vale of Keswick	1843		"Ye vales and hills whose beauty hither drew"	Epitaphs and Elegiac Pieces	1845
On the projected Kendal and Windermere Railway	1844, 12 October		"Is then no nook of English ground secure"	Miscellaneous Sonnets	1844
Proud were ye, Mountains, when, in times of old	1844		"Proud were ye, Mountains, when, in times of old,"	Miscellaneous Sonnets	1845
At Furness Abbey	1844		"Here, where, of havoc tired and rash undoing,"	Miscellaneous Sonnets	1845
VII	1845		"Forth from a jutting ridge, around whose base"	Poems on the Naming of Places	1845
The Westmoreland Girl. To my Grandchildren--	1845, 6 June		"Seek who will delight in fable "	Poems referring to the Period of Childhood	1845
At Furness Abbey	1845		"Well have yon Railway Labourers to this ground"	Miscellaneous Sonnets	1845
Yes! thou art fair, yet be not moved	1845		"Yes! thou art fair, yet be not moved"	Poems founded on the Affections	1845
What heavenly smiles! O Lady mine	1845		"What heavenly smiles! O Lady mine"	Poems founded on the Affections	1845
To a Lady	1843	In Answer to a request (from Jane Wallas Penfold) that I would write her a Poem upon some Drawings that she had made of Flowers in the Island of Madeira	"Fair Lady! can I sing of flowers"	Poems of the Fancy	1845
Glad sight wherever new with old	1842		"Glad sight wherever new with old"	Poems of the Fancy	1845
Love lies Bleeding	1842		"You call it, “Love lies bleeding,”—so you may"	Poems of the Fancy.	1842
They call it love lies bleeding! Rather Say	Unknown		"They call it Love lies bleeding! rather say"	No class assigned	Unknown
Companion to the foregoing [Love lies Bleeding]	Unknown		"Never enlivened with the liveliest ray"	No class assigned	1845
The Cuckoo-Clock	1842		"Wouldst thou be taught, when sleep has taken flight,"	“Poems of the Imagination.	1842
So fair, so sweet, withal so sensitive	1844		"So fair, so sweet, withal so sensitive,"	Poems of Sentiment and Reflection	1845
To the Pennsylvanians	1845		"Days undefiled by luxury or sloth,"	Sonnets dedicated to Liberty and Order	1845
Young England—what is then become of Old	1845		"Young England--what is then become of Old"	Sonnets dedicated to Liberty and Order	1845
Though the bold wings of Poesy affect	Unknown		"Though the bold wings of Poesy affect"	Miscellaneous Sonnets	1842
Suggested by a Picture of the Bird of Paradise	Unknown		"The gentlest Poet, with free thoughts endowed,"	Poems of the Imagination	1842
Sonnet	1846		"Why should we weep or mourn, Angelic boy,"	Epitaphs and Elegiac Poems.	1850
Where lies the truth? has Man, in wisdom's creed	1846		"Where lies the truth? has Man, in wisdom's creed,"	Evening Voluntaries	1850
I know an aged Man constrained to dwell	1846		"I know an aged Man constrained to dwell"	Miscellaneous Sonnets	1850
How beautiful the Queen of Night, on high	1846		"How beautiful the Queen of Night, on high"	Miscellaneous Poems.	1850
To Lucca Gioridano	1846		"Giordano, verily thy Pencil's skill"	Evening Voluntaries	1850
Who but is pleased to watch the moon on high	1846		"Who but is pleased to watch the moon on high"	Evening Voluntaries	1850
Illustrated Books and Newspapers	1846		"Discourse was deemed Man's noblest attribute,"	Poems of Sentiment and Reflection	1850
The unremitting voice of nightly streams	1846		"The unremitting voice of nightly streams"	Poems of Sentiment and Reflection	1850
Sonnet. (To an Octogenarian)	1846		"Affections lose their object; Time brings forth"	No class assigned	1850
On the Banks of a Rocky Stream	1846		"Behold an emblem of our human mind"	No class assigned	1850
Ode, performed in the senate-house, Cambridge, on 6 July 1847, at the first commencement after the installation of his royal highness the Prince Albert, Chancellor of the University.	1847		"For thirst of power that Heaven disowns,"	No class assigned	1847

== Juvenilia ==
Title	Composition date	Subtitle or former titles	Index of first lines	Classed as (by Wordsworth)	Publication date
Anacreon	1785-1797		"Waving in the wanton air"	Juvenilia	Unknown
The Death of the Starling Catull	1785-1797		"Pity mourn in plaintive tone"	Juvenilia	Unknown
Beauty and Moonlight	1785-1797	An Ode	"High o'er the silver Rocks I rov'd"	Juvenilia	Unknown
The Dog	1785-1797	An Idyllium	"Where were ye nympths when the remorseless deep"	Juvenilia	Unknown
Sonnet. Written by Mr. ----- Immediately after the death of his wife.	1785-1797		"The sun is dead - ye heard the curfew toll"	Juvenilia	Unknown
Dirge, Sung by a Minstrel	1785-1797		"List! the bell-Sprite stuns my ears"	Juvenilia	Unknown
Sonnet. On Seeing Miss Helen Maria Williams Weep at a tale of Distress	1785-1797		"She wept.--Life's purple tide began to flow"	Juvenilia	Unknown
The Vale of Esthwaite	1785-1797	[Empty [] indicate either illegible or damaged parts of the poem, that could not be salvaged.	"[ ]'s avaunt! with tenfold pleasure"	Juvenilia	Unknown
The Horse	1785-1797		"The foal of generous breed along the plains"	Juvenilia	Unknown
Ode to Apollo	1785-1797		"As the fresh wine the poet pours,"	Juvenilia	Unknown
The road extended o'ver a heath	1785-1797		"The road extended o'ver a heath"	Juvenilia	Unknown
Sweet was the walk along the narrow lane	1792 or earlier		"Sweet was the walk along the narrow lane"	No class assigned	Unknown
Septimi Gades	1785-1797		"Oh thou, whose fixed bewildered eye"	Juvenilia	Unknown
Imitation of Juvenal, Satire VIII	1785-1797		"What boots it, **, that thy princely blood"	Juvenilia	Unknown
Lesbia (Catullus, V)	1785-1797		"My Lesbia let us love and live"	Juvenilia	Unknown
Septimus and Acme (Catullus, XLV)	1785-1797	[Empty [] indicate either illegible or damaged parts of the poem, that could not be salvaged.	"Septimus thus his [] love addressed"	Juvenilia	Unknown
At the Isle of Wight	1793		"How sweet the walk along the woody steep"	Juvenilia	Unknown
The Three Graves	1785-1797		"Beneath this thorn when i was young"	Juvenilia	Unknown
The Convict	1785-1797		"The glory of evening was spread through the west;"	Juvenilia	1798
Incipient Madness	1785-1797		"I crossed the dreary moor"	Juvenilia	Unknown
Argument for Suicide	1785-1797		"Send this man to the mine, this to the battle,"	Juvenilia	Unknown
To Lady Eleanor Butler And The Honourable Miss Ponsonby,	1824		"A stream to mingle with your favorite Dee"	No class assigned	Unknown
The Passing of the Elder Bards	1835, November	Contained within "Extempore Effusion upon the Death of James Hogg"	"The Mighty Minstrel breathes no longer,"	No class assigned	Unknown
By the side of the grave some years after	1798		"Long time his pulse hath ceased to beat"	No class assigned	Unknown
Song for the Spinning Wheel	1812	Founded upon a Belief Prevalent among the Pastoral Vales of Westmoreland	"Swiftly turn the murmuring wheel!"	Poems of the Fancy	1820
To a Distant Friend	Unknown		" Why art thou silent! Is thy love a plant"	No class assigned	Unknown
The Wishing Gate	1829	In the vale of Grasmere, by the side of an old highway leading to Ambleside, is a gate, which, from time out of mind, has been called the Wishing-gate, from a belief that wishes formed or indulged there have a favorable issue.	"Hope rules a land for ever green:"	Poems of the Imagination.	1829
Calm is all nature as a resting wheel.	Unknown		"Calm is all nature as a resting wheel."	No class assigned	Unknown
Minstrels	Unknown		"The minstrels played their Christmas tune"	No class assigned	Unknown
GREAT men have been among us; hands that penn'd	1802, September		"Great men have been among us; hands that penn'd"	No class assigned	1807
IT is not to be thought of that the flood	1802, September		"It is not to be thought of that the flood"	No class assigned	1807
WHEN I have borne in memory what has tamed	1802, September		"When I have borne in memory what has tamed"	No class assigned	1807
SHE dwelt among the untrodden ways	1799		"She dwelt among the untrodden ways"	Poems founded on the Affections	1800
I TRAVELL'D among unknown men	1799		"I Travell'd among unknown men,"	Poems founded on the Affections	1807
A SLUMBER did my spirit seal	1799		"A Slumber did my spirit seal;"	Poems of the Imagination	1800
STRANGE fits of passion have I known	1799		"Strange fits of passion have I known:"	Poems founded on the Affections	1800
THREE years she grew in sun and shower	1799	Former title: Bore the title of: "Lucy" from 1836–1843 within the table of contents of those published editions.	"Three years she grew in sun and shower;"	Poems of the Imagination	1800
A Jewish family in a small valley opposite St. Goar, Upon the Rhine	1828		"Genius of Raphael! if thy wings"	Poems of the Imagination	1835
The Snow-Tracks of my friends I see	1798		"The snow-tracks of my friends I see,"	No class assigned	Unknown
There is a shapeless crowd of unhewn stones	1800		"There is a shapeless crowd of unhewn stones"	No class assigned	Unknown
Along the mazes of this song I go	1802		"Along the mazes of this song I go"	No class assigned	Unknown
The Rains at length have ceas'd, the winds are still'd	1802		"The rains at length have ceas'd, the winds are still'd,"	No class assigned	Unknown
Witness Thou	1802		"Witness thou"	No class assigned	Unknown
Wild-Fowl	1802		"The order'd troops"	No class assigned	Unknown
Written in a Grotto	1802		"O moon! if e'er I joyed when thy soft light"	No class assigned	1802, 9 March
The Recluse Part First	1802	Home at Grasmere	"Once to the verge of yon steep barrier came"	No class assigned	Unknown
Shall he who gives his days to low pursuits	1802		"Shall he who gives his days to low pursuits"	No class assigned	Unknown
I find it written on simonides	1803		"I find it written of Simonides,"	No class assigned	1803, 10 October
No Whimsey of the Purse is here	1804		"No whimsey of the purse is here,"	No class assigned	Unknown
Peaceful our Valley Fair and Green	1805		"Peaceful our valley, fair and green;"	No class assigned	Unknown
To the evening star over grasmere water, July 1806	1806		"The Lake is thine,"	No class assigned	Unknown
Come, gentle sleep, Death's Image tho' thou art"	Unknown		"Come, gentle Sleep, Death's image tho' thou art,"	No class assigned	Unknown
Brook, that hast been my solace days and weeks,	1806		"Brook, that hast been my solace days and weeks,"	No class assigned	1815
The Scottish Broom on Bird-nest brae	1818		"The Scottish Broom on Bird-nest brae"	No class assigned	Unknown
Critics, right honourable Bard, decree	1818		" “Critics, right honourable Bard, decree"	No class assigned	Unknown
Through Cumbrian wilds, in many a mountain cove,	1819		"Through Cumbrian wilds, in many a mountain cove"	No class assigned	Unknown
Author's Voyage Down the Rhine	1820	(Thirty Years Ago)	"The confidence of Youth our only Art,"	No class assigned	Unknown
These vales were saddened with no common gloom	1822		"These vales were saddened with no common gloom"	No class assigned	Unknown
Arms and the Man I sing, the first who bore	1823		"Arms and the Man I sing, the first who bore"	No class assigned	Unknown
Lines addressed to Joanna H. From the Gwerndwffnant in June 1826	1826	By Dorothy Wrodsworth	"A twofold harmony is here;"	No class assigned	Unknown
Holiday at Gwerndwffnant, May 1826. Irregular Stanzas	1826	By Dorothy Wordsworth	"You're here for one long vernal day;"	No class assigned	Unknown
Composed when a probability existed of our being obliged to quit rydal mount as a residence	1826		"The doubt to which a wavering hope had clung"	No class assigned	Unknown
I, whose pretty Voice you hear,	1826		"I, whose pretty Voice you hear,"	No class assigned	Unknown
To my niece Dora	1827		"Confiding hopes of youthful hearts,"	No class assigned	Unknown
My Lord and Lady Darlington	1829		"My Lord and Lady Darlington,"	No class assigned	Unknown
To the Utlitarians	1833		"Avaunt this œconomic rage!"	No class assigned	Unknown
Throned in the Sun's descending car,	Unknown		"Throned in the Sun's descending car,"	No class assigned	Unknown
And oh! dear soother of the pensive breast,	1835		"And oh! dear soother of the pensive breast,"	No class assigned	Unknown
Said red-ribboned Evans:	1836		"Said red-ribboned Evans:"	No class assigned	Unknown
The Ball whizzed by,—it grazed his ear,	1837		"The Ball whizzed by,—it grazed his ear,"	No class assigned	Unknown
Wouldst thou be gathered to Christ's chosen flock,	1838		"Wouldst thou be gathered to Christ's chosen flock,"	No class assigned	Unknown
Said Secrecy to Cowardice and Fraud,	1838		Said Secrecy to Cowardice and Fraud,	No class assigned	1838
Oh Bounty without measure, while the grace	1840		"Oh Bounty without measure, while the Grace"	No class assigned	Unknown
Deign, Sovereign Mistress! to accept a lay,	1846		"Deign, Sovereign Mistress! to accept a lay,"	No class assigned	Unknown
To Miss Sellon	1847		"The vestal priestess of a sisterhood who knows"	No class assigned	Unknown
And You will leave me thus along	1785-1797		"And You will leave me thus along"	Juvenilia	Unknown
on the death of an unfortunate lady	1785-1797		"on the death of an unfortunate lady"	Juvenilia	Unknown
A Winter's Evening - Fragment of an Ode to Winter	1785-1797		"-But hark! the Curfew tolls! and lo! the night"	Juvenilia	Unknown
Here M. ----sleep[s] who liv'd a patriarch's days	1785-1797		"Here M. ----sleep[s] who liv'd a patriarch's days"	Juvenilia	Unknown
Pity"What tho' my griefs must never flow"	1785-1797		"What tho' my griefs must never flow"	Juvenilia	Unknown
melancholy joy	1785-1797	[Empty [] indicate either illegible or damaged parts of the poem, that could not be salvaged.	"[] melancholy joy"	Juvenilia	Unknown
Pity. now too while o'er the heart we feel	1785-1797		"now too while o'er the heart we feel"	Juvenilia	Unknown
in Evening tints of joy [array'd]	1785-1797		"in Evening tints of joy [array'd]	Juvenilia	Unknown
How sweet at Eve's still hour the song'	1785-1797		"How sweet at Eve's still hour the song'	Juvenilia	Unknown
Vale Longum Vale. Sentiments of Affection for inanimate Nature	1785-1797		"To mark the white smoke rising slow"	Juvenilia	Unknown
But cease my Soul ah! cease to pry	1785-1797		"But cease my Soul ah! cease to pry"	Juvenilia	Unknown
Evening Sounds	1785-1797		"- the ploughboy by his gingling wane"	Juvenilia	Unknown
Description of a dying storm	1785-1797		"Now hollow sounding all around i hear"	Juvenilia	Unknown
Scenes	1785-1797		"- The taper turn'd from blue to red"	Juvenilia	Unknown
What from the social chain can tear	1785-1797		"What from the social chain can tear"	Juvenilia	Unknown
how Sweet in Life's tear-glistening morn	1785-1797		"how Sweet in Life's tear-glistening morn"	Juvenilia	Unknown
Come thou in robe of darkest blue	1785-1797	[To Melpomene]	"Come thou in robe of darkest blue"	Juvenilia	Unknown
Hope	1785-1797		"Yon hamlet far across the vale"	Juvenilia	Unknown
Torrent	1785-1797		"The torrent's yelling Spectre, seen"	Juvenilia	Unknown
Hoarse sound the swoln and angry floods	1785-1797		"Hoarse sound the swoln and angry floods"	Juvenilia	Unknown
The moaning owl I shall soon	1785-1797		"The moaning owl I shall soon"	Juvenilia	Unknown
I the while	1785-1797		"I the while"	Juvenilia	Unknown
On tiptoe forward as I lean'd aghast	1785-1797		"On tiptoe forward as I lean'd aghast"	Juvenilia	Unknown
Death a Dirge	1785-1797		"List! the death-bell stuns mine ears"	Juvenilia	Unknown
Shipwreck of the soul	1785-1797		"Then did dire forms and ghastly faces float"	Juvenilia	Unknown
Evening Sonnets	1785-1797		"When slow from twilight's latest gleams"	Juvenilia	Unknown
Horace to Apollo	1785-1797		"As the fresh wine the poet pours"	Juvenilia	Unknown
From the Greek	1785-1797		"And I will bear my vengeful blade"	Juvenilia	Unknown
Lament for Bion (from Moschus)	1785-1797		"Ah me! the lowliest children of spring"	Juvenilia	Unknown
Lines on Milton	1785-1797		"On Religion's holy hill"	Juvenilia	Unknown
If grief dismiss me not to them that rest	1785-1797		"If grief dismiss me not to them that rest"	Juvenilia	Unknown
The western clouds a deepening gloom display	1785-1797		"The western clouds a deepening gloom display"	Juvenilia	Unknown
Inscription for a seat by the pathway to the side ascending to Windy Brow	1785-1797		"Ye who with buoyant spirits blessed"	Juvenilia	Unknown
Thou who with youthfull vigour rich, and light	1785-1797		"Thou who with youthfull vigour rich, and light"	Juvenilia	Unknown
[Ode] (from Horace)	1785-1797		"Blandusian spring than glass more brightly dear"	Juvenilia	Unknown
Unplaced lines for [Imitation of Juvenal, Satire VIII]	1785-1797		"Ye kings, in wisdom, sense and power, supreme,"	Juvenilia	Unknown
The hour-bell sounds and I must go	1785-1797		"The hour-bell sounds and I must go"	Juvenilia	Unknown
Address to the Ocean	1785-1797		"'How long will ye round me be roaring,"	Juvenilia	Unknown
Greyhound Ballad	1785-1797		"The barren wife all sad in mind"	Juvenilia	Unknown

== Notes ==
1.In 1798, approximately a third of the poem was published under the title: "The Female Vagrant". "The Female Vagrant" began at either Stanzas: XXIII or XXXIV of the poem in its current form.
