= A slumber did my spirit seal =

Poem by William Wordsworth

"A slumber did my spirit seal" is a poem that was written by William Wordsworth in 1798 and first published in volume II of the 1800 edition of Lyrical Ballads. Although the name Lucy is not directly mentioned in the poem, scholars nevertheless believe it to be part of the "Lucy poems" due to the poem's placement in Lyrical Ballads.

== Background ==
During the autumn of 1798, Wordsworth travelled to Germany with his sister Dorothy and fellow poet Samuel Taylor Coleridge. From October 1798, Wordsworth worked on the drafts for his "Lucy poems", which included "Strange fits of passion have I known", "She dwelt among the untrodden ways" and "A slumber". In December 1798, Wordsworth sent copies of "Strange fits" and "She dwelt" to Coleridge and followed his letter with "A slumber". Eventually, "A slumber", was published in the 1800 edition of Lyrical Ballads.

Unique amongst Lucy poems, "A slumber" does not directly mention Lucy. The decision by critics to include the poem as part of the series is based in part on Wordsworth's placing it in close proximity to "Strange fits" and directly after "She dwelt" in the Lyrical Ballads.

== Poem ==
The Lucy poems fall within a genre of poems that includes Robert Herrick's lamentations on the death of young girls. Written in spare language, "A slumber..." consists of two stanzas, each four lines. The first is built upon an even, soporific movement in which figurative language conveys the nebulous image of a girl. The poem begins:

A slumber did my spirit seal;
I had no human fears:
She seemed a thing that could not feel
The touch of earthly years. (lines 1–4)

The second stanza maintains the quiet, even tone of the first, but serves to undermine the former's sense of the eternal by revealing that Lucy has, by the time of composition, died. The narrator's response to her death lacks bitterness or emptiness; and instead takes consolation from the fact that she is now beyond life's trials:

No motion has she now, no force;
She neither hears nor sees;
Rolled round in earth's diurnal course,
With rocks, and stones, and trees. (lines 5–8)

== Themes ==
Lucy is an isolated figure in which the narrator responds to her death. The beginning of the poem, according to Wordsworth biographer Mary Moorman, depicts a "creative sleep of the senses when the 'soul' and imagination are most alive." This idea appears in other poems by Wordsworth, including Tintern Abbey. The space between stanza one and stanza two depicts a transition of Lucy from life into death. The two stanzas also show that Lucy, a being connected intrinsically to nature, dies before she can attain her own distinct consciousness apart from nature. However, as literary critic Geoffrey Hartman explains, "Growing further into consciousness means a simultaneous development into death [...] and not growing further also means death (animal tranquillity, absorption by nature)." The lifeless rocks and stones described in the concluding line convey the finality of Lucy's death. Boris Ford argues that within the second stanza as "the dead girl is now at last secure beyond question, in inanimate community with the earth's natural fixtures." Coleridge, in a letter to Thomas Poole, states, "Whether it had any reality I cannot say. Most probably, in some gloomier moment he had fancied the moment when his sister might die."

Coleridge's reference was to the state of Lucy as dying or dead within the Lucy poems as a whole and to "A slumber" in particular. Although Lucy cannot be established, it is certain that there is a relationship between the name Lucy and Wordsworth's sister within Wordsworth's poetry since Wordsworth used the name Lucy in reference to his sister in many poems, including "The Glow-Worm" and "Nutting". The problem with relating Lucy to Dorothy is in explaining why Dorothy would be presented in a state of death. Dorothy was alive during the composition of the poem, and presented as alive in other Wordsworth poems like The Prelude. As such, the poems are most likely not about Dorothy but just a continuation of a theme in general.

Lucy is presented as character connected to nature who exists in a state between the spiritual and human; similar to a mythical nymph. However, she represents a state of consciousness and exists within the poem as part of the narrator's consciousness. The first stanza describes the narrator transcending human fears because his feelings towards an immortality connected to Lucy, a feeling brought up in "Strange fits". These feelings of immortality continue in the second stanza because, though dead, she is separated from him by death. She is always a being connected to nature, and the narrator slumbers because his understanding of Lucy is not conscious.

Since Lucy exists on an unconscious level for the narrator, he cannot grasp her until she has died. As such, he experiences the events as one who is woken from a dream without an understanding of what the dream entailed, and is not able to feel shock at learning of her death. This is thematically represented in the poem by placing Lucy's death between the two stanzas.

== Critical reception ==
Upon receiving Wordsworth's letter containing a copy of "A slumber", Coleridge described the work as a "sublime epitaph". Wordsworth's friend Thomas Powell wrote that the poem "stands by itself, and is without title prefixed, yet we are to know, from the penetration of Mr. Wordsworth's admirers, that it is a sequel to the other deep poems that precede it, and is about one Lucy, who is dead. From the table of contents, however, we are informed by the author that it is about 'A Slumber;' for this is the actual title which he has condescended to give it, to put us out of pain as to what it is about."

In 1967, Hartman claims that within the poem, "Wordsworth achieves the most haunting of his elisions of the human as a mode of being separate from nature." John Mahoney, in 1997, emphasises the poem's "brilliant alliteration of the opening lines" along with pointing out that "the utter simplicity masks the profundity of feeling; the delicate naturalness of language hides the range of implication". Antonia Till remarks that the poem consists mainly of monosyllables with the occasional disyllable. Thus the use of the near-scientific word 'diurnal' achieves astonishing power, bringing a cosmic dimension to the girl's death and demonstrating Wordsworth's mastery of both the majestic and the mundane in his poetry.
