= The Lucy poems =

Five poems written by William Wordsworth

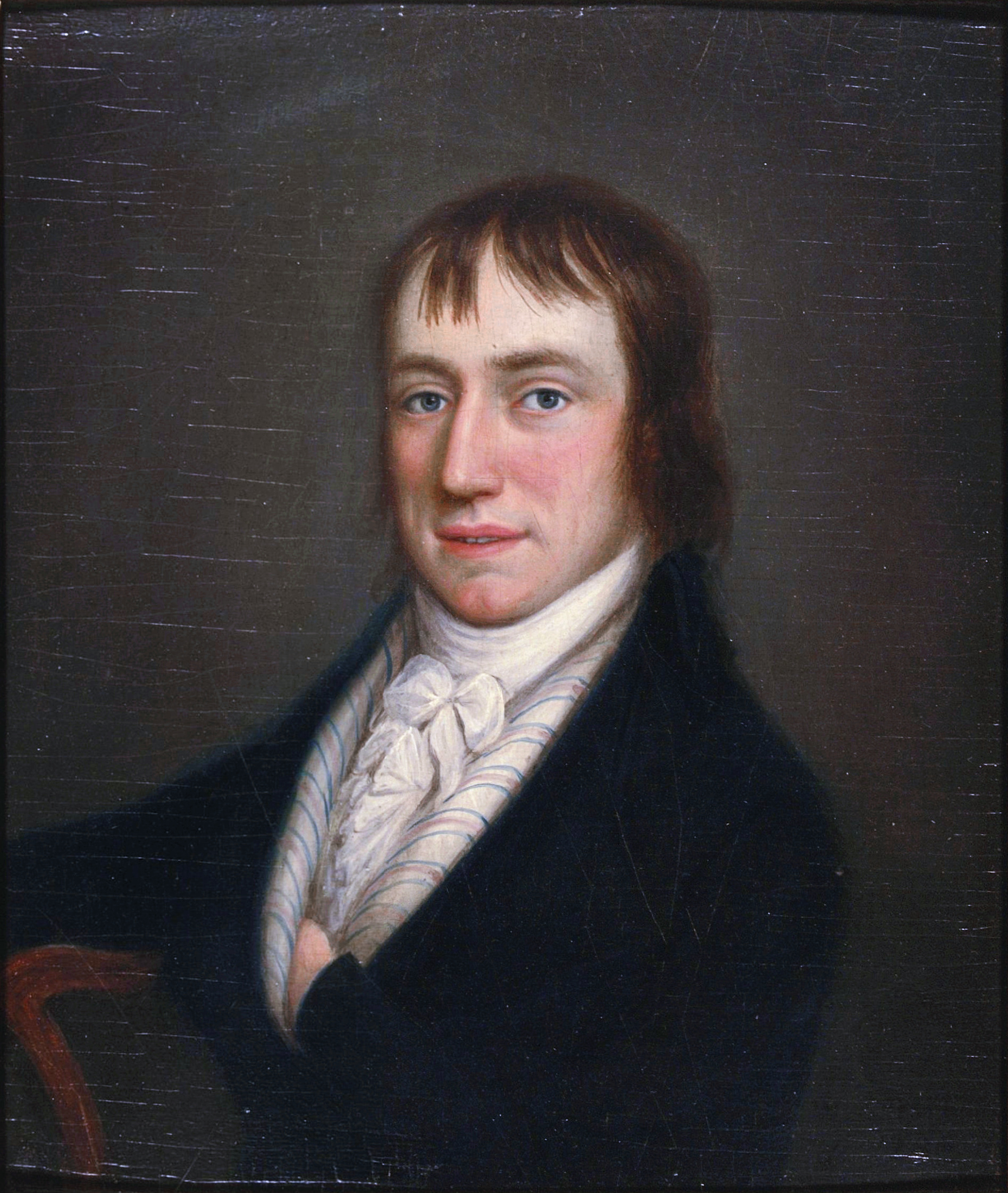
William Shuter, Portrait of William Wordsworth, 1798. The earliest known portrait of Wordsworth, painted in the year he wrote the first drafts of "The Lucy poems"

The Lucy poems are a series of five poems composed by the English Romantic poet William Wordsworth (1770–1850) between 1798 and 1801. All but one were first published during 1800 in the second edition of Lyrical Ballads, a collaboration between Wordsworth and Samuel Taylor Coleridge that was both Wordsworth's first major publication and a milestone in the early English Romantic movement. (Note: The fifth poem, "I travelled among unknown men", first appeared in Poems, in Two Volumes, published in 1807. Wu 1999, 250) In the series, Wordsworth sought to write unaffected English verse infused with abstract ideals of beauty, nature, love, longing, and death.

The "Lucy poems" consist of "Strange fits of passion have I known", "She dwelt among the untrodden ways", "A slumber did my spirit seal", "Three years she grew in sun and shower", which were all published in the second edition of Lyrical Ballads (1800), and "I travelled among unknown men", which was published in Poems, in Two Volumes (1807). Although they are presented as a series in modern anthologies, Wordsworth did not conceive of them as a group, nor did he seek to publish the poems in sequence. He described the works as "experimental" in the prefaces to both the 1798 and 1800 editions of Lyrical Ballads, and revised the poems significantly—shifting their thematic emphasis—between 1798 and 1799. Only after his death in 1850 did publishers and critics begin to treat the poems as a fixed group.

The poems were written during a short period while the poet lived in Germany. Although they individually deal with a variety of themes, the idea of Lucy's death weighs heavily on the poet throughout the series, imbuing the poems with a melancholic, elegiac tone. Whether Lucy was based on a real woman or was a figment of the poet's imagination has long been a matter of debate among scholars. Generally reticent about the poems, Wordsworth never revealed the details of her origin or identity. Some scholars speculate that Lucy is based on his sister Dorothy, while others see her as a fictitious or hybrid character. Most critics agree that she is essentially a literary device upon whom he could project, meditate and reflect.

== Background ==
=== Lyrical Ballads ===
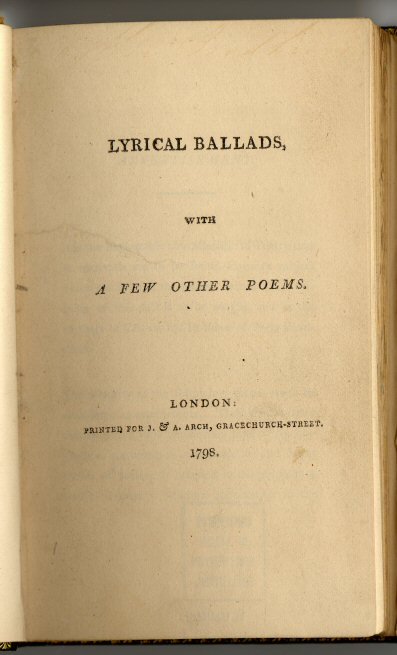
Title page for the first edition of Lyrical Ballads

In 1798, Wordsworth and Samuel Taylor Coleridge jointly published Lyrical Ballads, with a Few Other Poems, a collection of verses each had written separately. The book became hugely popular and was published widely; it is generally considered a herald of the Romantic movement in English literature. In it, Wordsworth aimed to use everyday language in his compositions as set out in the preface to the 1802 edition: "The principal object, then, proposed in these Poems was to choose incidents and situations from common life, and to relate or describe them, throughout, as far as was possible in a selection of language really used by men, and at the same time, to throw over them a certain colouring of imagination, whereby ordinary things should be presented to the mind in an unusual aspect."

The two poets had met three years earlier in either late August or September 1795 in Bristol. The meeting laid the foundation for an intense and profoundly creative friendship, based in part on their shared disdain for the artificial diction of the poetry of the era. Beginning in 1797, the two lived within walking distance of each other in Somerset, which solidified their friendship. Wordsworth believed that his life before meeting Coleridge was sedentary and dull and that his poetry amounted to little. Coleridge influenced Wordsworth, and his praise and encouragement inspired Wordsworth to write prolifically. Dorothy, Wordsworth's sister, related the effect Coleridge had on her brother in a March 1798 letter: "His faculties seem to expand every day, he composes with much more facility than he did, as to the mechanism [emphasis in original] of poetry, and his ideas flow faster than he can express them." With his new inspiration, Wordsworth came to believe he could write poetry rivalling that of John Milton. He and Coleridge planned to collaborate, but never moved beyond suggestions and notes for each other.

The expiration of Wordsworth's Alfoxton House lease soon provided an opportunity for the two friends to live together. They conceived a plan to settle in Germany with Dorothy and Coleridge's wife, Sara, "to pass the two ensuing years in order to acquire the German language and to furnish ourselves with a tolerable stock of information in natural science". In September 1798, Wordsworth, Coleridge, and Dorothy travelled to Germany to explore proximate living arrangements, but this proved difficult. Although they lived together in Hamburg for a short time, the city was too expensive for their budgets. Coleridge soon found accommodations in the town of Ratzeburg in Schleswig-Holstein, which was less expensive but still socially vibrant. The impoverished Wordsworth, however, could neither afford to follow Coleridge nor provide for himself and his sister in Hamburg; the siblings instead moved to moderately priced accommodations in Goslar in Lower Saxony, Germany.

=== Separation from Coleridge ===
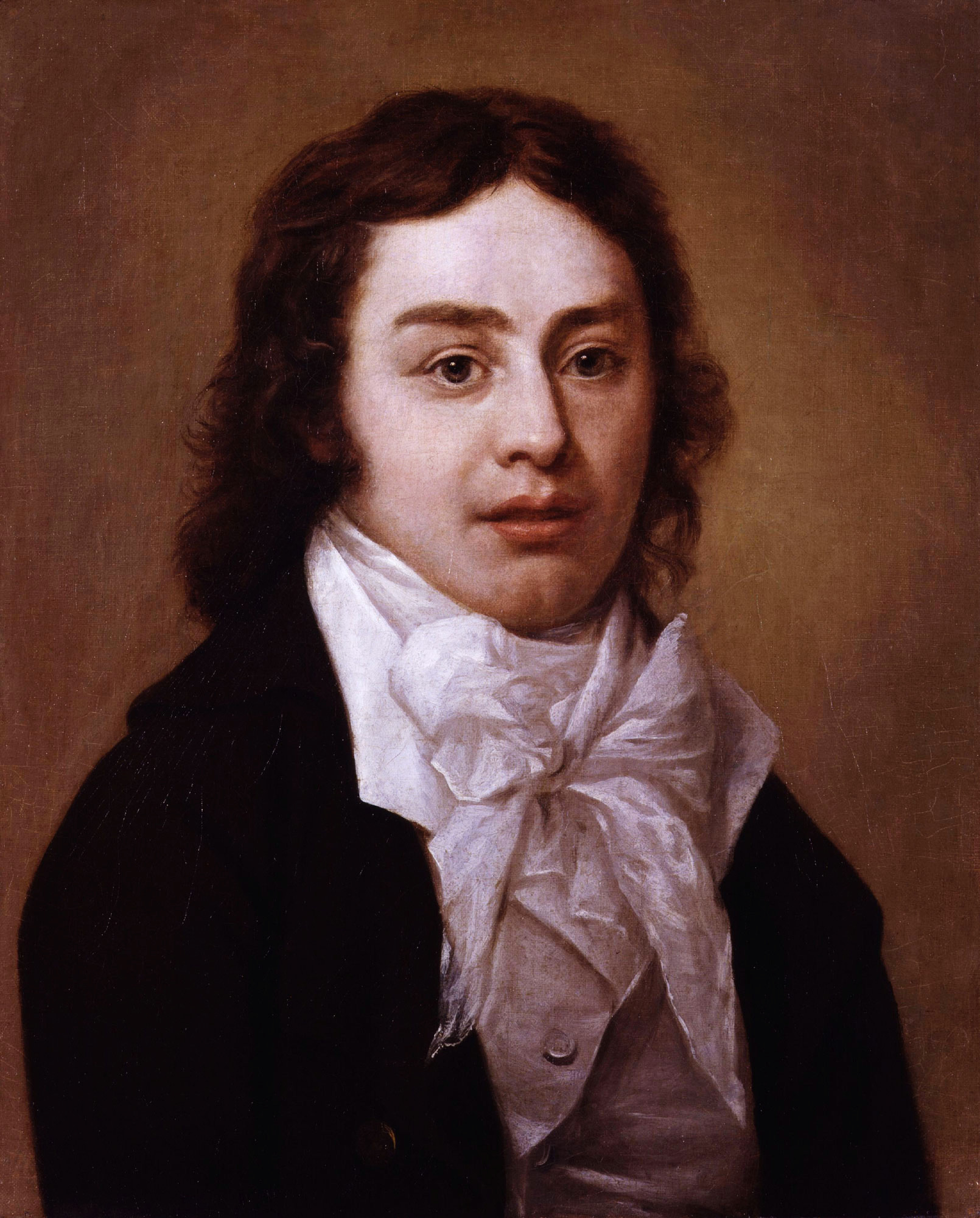
Samuel Taylor Coleridge, by Peter Van Dyke, 1795. A major poet and one of the foremost critics of the day, Coleridge collaborated on Lyrical Ballads with Wordsworth and remained a close friend and confidant for many years.

Between October 1798 and February 1799, Wordsworth worked on the first draft of the "Lucy poems" together with a number of other verses, including the "Matthew poems", "Lucy Gray" and The Prelude. Coleridge had yet to join the siblings in Germany, and Wordsworth's separation from his friend depressed him. In the three months following their parting, Wordsworth completed the first three of the "Lucy poems": "Strange fits", "She dwelt", and "A slumber". They first appeared in a letter to Coleridge dated December 1798, in which Wordsworth wrote that "She dwelt" and "Strange fits" were "little Rhyme poems which I hope will amuse you". Wordsworth characterised the two poems thus to mitigate any disappointment Coleridge might suffer in receiving these two poems instead of the promised three-part philosophical epic The Recluse.

In the same letter, Wordsworth complained that:

As I have had no books I have been obliged to write in self-defense. I should have written five times as much as I have done but that I am prevented by an uneasiness at my stomach and side, with a dull pain about my heart. I have used the word pain, but uneasiness and heat are words which more accurately express my feelings. At all events it renders writing unpleasant. Reading is now become a kind of luxury to me. When I do not read I am absolutely consumed by thinking and feeling and bodily exertions of voice or of limbs, the consequence of those feelings.

Wordsworth partially blamed Dorothy for the abrupt loss of Coleridge's company. He felt that their finances—insufficient for supporting them both in Ratzeburg—would have easily supported him alone, allowing him to follow Coleridge. Wordsworth's anguish was compounded by the contrast between his life and that of his friend. Coleridge's financial means allowed him to entertain lavishly and to seek the company of nobles and intellectuals; Wordsworth's limited wealth constrained him to a quiet and modest life. Wordsworth's envy seeped into his letters when he described Coleridge and his new friends as "more favored sojourners" who may "be chattering and chatter'd to, through the whole day".

Although Wordsworth sought emotional support from his sister, their relationship remained strained throughout their time in Germany. Separated from his friend and forced to live in the sole company of his sister, Wordsworth used the "Lucy poems" as an emotional outlet.

=== Identity of Lucy ===
Wordsworth did not reveal the inspiration for the character of Lucy, and over the years the topic has generated intense speculation among literary historians. Little biographical information can be drawn from the poems—it is difficult even to determine Lucy's age. In the mid-19th century, Thomas DeQuincey (1785–1859), author and one-time friend of Wordsworth, wrote that the poet "always preserved a mysterious silence on the subject of that 'Lucy', repeatedly alluded to or apostrophised in his poems, and I have heard, from gossiping people about Hawkshead, some snatches of tragic story, which, after all, might be an idle semi-fable, improved out of slight materials."

Critic Herbert Hartman believes Lucy's name was taken from "a neo-Arcadian commonplace", and argues she was not intended to represent any single person. In the view of one Wordsworth biographer, Mary Moorman (1906–1994), "The identity of 'Lucy' has been the problem of critics for many years. But Wordsworth is a poet before he is a biographer, and neither 'Lucy' nor her home nor his relations with her are necessarily in the strict sense historical. Nevertheless, as the Lyrical Ballads were all of them 'founded on fact' in some way, and as Wordsworth's mind was essentially factual, it would be rash to say that Lucy is entirely fictitious."

Moorman suggests that Lucy may represent Wordsworth's romantic interest Mary Hutchinson, (Note: Critics strongly contested this assertion; see Margoliouth 1966, 52) but wonders why she would be represented as one who died. It is possible that Wordsworth was thinking of Margaret Hutchinson, Mary's sister who had died. There is no evidence, however, that the poet loved any of the Hutchinsons other than Mary. It is more likely that Margaret's death influenced but is not the foundation for Lucy.

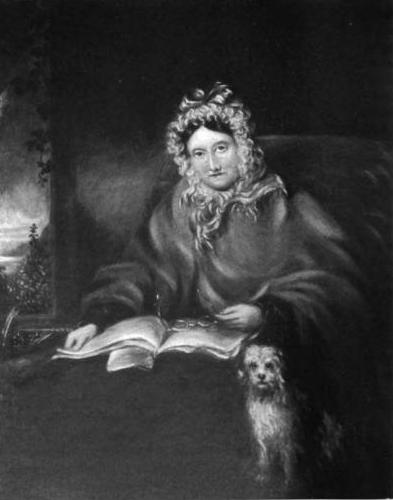
W. Crowbent, 1907, Portrait of Dorothy Wordsworth, depicting her later in life, (drawing from a photograph).

In 1980, Hunter Davies contended that the series was written for the poet's sister Dorothy, but found the Lucy–Dorothy allusion "bizarre". Earlier, literary critic Richard Matlak tried to explain the Lucy–Dorothy connection, and wrote that Dorothy represented a financial burden to Wordsworth, which had effectively forced his separation from Coleridge. Wordsworth, depressed over the separation from his friend, in this interpretation, expresses both his love for his sister and fantasies about her loss through the poems. Throughout the poems, the narrator's mixture of mourning and antipathy is accompanied by denial and guilt; his denial of the Lucy–Dorothy relationship and the lack of narratorial responsibility for the death of Lucy allow him to escape from questioning his desires for the death of his sister. After Wordsworth began the "Lucy poems", Coleridge wrote, "Some months ago Wordsworth transmitted to me a most sublime Epitaph / whether it had any reality, I cannot say. —Most probably, in some gloomier moment he had fancied the moment in which his Sister might die." It is, however, possible that Wordsworth simply feared her death and did not wish it, even subconsciously. (Note: Further examples of Lucy representing Dorothy can be found in "The Glow-Worm" and "Nutting". A recently published version of "Nutting" makes the connection between Dorothy and Lucy more explicit, and suggests that the play with the incest prohibition came equally from Dorothy as from William. See Johnston 2000, 465)

Reflecting on the significance and relevance of Lucy's identity, the 19th-century poet, essayist and literary critic Frederic Myers (1843–1901) observed that:

here it was that the memory of some emotion prompted the lines on "Lucy". Of the history of that emotion, he has told us nothing; I forbear, therefore, to inquire concerning it, or even to speculate. That it was to the poet's honour, I do not doubt; but who ever learned such secrets rightly? or who should wish to learn? It is best to leave the sanctuary of all hearts inviolate, and to respect the reserve not only of the living but of the dead. Of these poems, almost alone, Wordsworth in his autobiographical notes has said nothing whatever.

Literary scholar Karl Kroeber (1926–2009) argues that Lucy "possesses a double existence; her actual, historical existence and her idealised existence in the poet's mind. In the poem, Lucy is both actual and idealised, but her actuality is relevant only insofar as it makes manifest the significance implicit in the actual girl." Hartman holds the same view; to him Lucy is seen "entirely from within the poet, so that this modality may be the poet's own", but then he argues, "she belongs to the category of spirits who must still become human ... the poet describes her as dying at a point at which she would have been humanized." The literary historian Kenneth Johnston concludes that Lucy was created as the personification of Wordsworth's muse, and the group as a whole "is a series of invocations to a Muse feared to be dead...As epitaphs, they are not sad, a very inadequate word to describe them, but breathlessly, almost wordlessly aware of what such a loss would mean to the speaker: 'oh, the difference to me!'"

Scholar John Mahoney observes that whether Lucy is intended to represent Dorothy, Mary or another is much less important to understanding the poems than the fact that she represented "a hidden being who seems to lack flaws and is alone in the world". Furthermore, she is represented as being insignificant in the public sphere but of the utmost importance in the private sphere; in "She dwelt" this manifests through the comparison of Lucy to both a hidden flower and a shining star. Neither Lucy nor Wordsworth's other female characters "exist as independent self-conscious human beings with minds as capable of the poet's" and are "rarely allowed to speak for themselves". G. Kim Blank takes a psycho-autobiographical approach: he situates the core Lucy poems in the context of what surfaces during Wordsworth's depressive and stressful German experience in the winter of 1798–1799; he concludes that "Lucy dies at the threshold of being fully expressed as a feeling of loss," and that, for Wordsworth, she "represents a cluster of unresolved emotions"—Wordsworth's own emotions, that is.

== The poems ==
The "Lucy poems" are written from the point of view of a lover who has long viewed the object of his affection from afar, and who is now affected by her death. (Note: Most of the poems Wordsworth wrote while living in Goslar were about people who had died or were about to die. Johnston 2000, 463) Yet Wordsworth structured the poems so that they are not about any one person who has died; instead they were written about a figure representing the poet's lost inspiration. Lucy is Wordsworth's inspiration, and the poems as a whole are, according to Wordsworth biographer Kenneth Johnston, "invocations to a Muse feared to be dead". Lucy is represented in all five poems as sexless; it is unlikely that the poet ever realistically saw her as a possible lover. Instead, she is presented as an ideal and represents Wordsworth's frustration at his separation from Coleridge; the asexual imagery reflects the futility of his longing.

Wordsworth's voice slowly disappears from the poems as they progress, and his voice is entirely absent from the fifth poem. His love operates on the subconscious level, and he relates to Lucy more as a spirit of nature than as a human being. The poet's grief is private, and he is unable to fully explain its source. When Lucy's lover is present, he is completely immersed in human interactions and the human aspects of nature, and the death of his beloved is a total loss for the lover. The 20th-century critic Spencer Hall argues that the poet represents a "fragile kind of humanism".

=== "Strange fits of passion have I known" ===
"Strange fits" is probably the earliest of the poems and revolves around a fantasy of Lucy's death. It describes the narrator's journey to Lucy's cottage and his thoughts along the way. Throughout, the motion of the Moon is set in opposition to the motion of the speaker. The poem contains seven stanzas, a relatively elaborate structure which underscores his ambivalent attitude towards Lucy's imagined death. The constant shifts in perspective and mood reflect his conflicting emotions. The first stanza, with its use of dramatic phrases such as "fits of passion" and "dare to tell", contrasts with the subdued tone of the rest of the poem. As a lyrical ballad, "Strange fits" differs from the traditional ballad form, which emphasises abnormal action, and instead focuses on mood.

The presence of death is felt throughout the poem, although it is mentioned explicitly only in the final line. The Moon, a symbol of the beloved, sinks steadily as the poem progresses, until its abrupt drop in the penultimate stanza. That the speaker links Lucy with the Moon is clear, though his reasons are unclear. The Moon nevertheless plays a significant role in the action of the poem: as the lover imagines the Moon slowly sinking behind Lucy's cottage, he is entranced by its motion. By the fifth stanza, the speaker has been lulled into a somnambulistic trance—he sleeps while still keeping his eyes on the Moon (lines 17–20).

The narrator's conscious presence is wholly absent from the next stanza, which moves forward in what literary theorist Geoffrey Hartman describes as a "motion approaching yet never quite attaining its end". When the Moon abruptly drops behind the cottage, the narrator snaps out of his dream, and his thoughts turn towards death. Lucy, the beloved, is united with the landscape in death, while the image of the retreating, entrancing Moon is used to portray the idea of looking beyond one's lover. The darker possibility also remains that the dream state represents the fulfilment of the lover's fantasy through the death of the beloved. In falling asleep while approaching his beloved's home, the lover betrays his own reluctance to be with Lucy.

Wordsworth made numerous revisions to each of the "Lucy poems". The earliest version of "Strange fits" appears in a December 1798 letter from Dorothy to Coleridge. This draft contains many differences in phrasing and does not include a stanza that appeared in the final published version. The new lines direct the narrative towards "the Lover's ear alone", implying that only other lovers can understand the relationship between the Moon, the beloved and the beloved's death. Wordsworth also removed from the final stanza the lines:

I told her this; her laughter light
Is ringing in my ears;
And when I think upon that night
My eyes are dim with tears.

This final stanza lost its significance with the completion of the later poems in the series, and the revision allowed for a sense of anticipation at the poem's close and helped draw the audience into the story of the remaining "Lucy poems". Of the other changes, only the description of the horse's movement is important: "My horse trudg'd on" becomes "With quickening pace my horse drew nigh", which heightens the narrator's vulnerability to fantasies and dreams in the revised version.

=== "She dwelt among the untrodden ways" ===
"She dwelt among the untrodden ways" presents Lucy as having lived in solitude near the source of the River Dove. (Note: Wordsworth knew three rivers of that name; in Derbyshire, Yorkshire and Westmorland, but each could equally be the setting for the verse.) According to literary critic Geoffrey Durrant, the poem charts her "growth, perfection, and death". To convey the dignified, unaffected naturalness of his subject, Wordsworth uses simple language, mostly words of one syllable. In the opening quatrain, he describes the isolated and untouched area where Lucy lived, as well as her innocence and beauty, which he compares to that of a hidden flower in the second. The poem begins in a descriptive rather than narrative manner, and it is not until the line "When Lucy ceased to be" that the reader is made aware that the subject of the verse has died. Literary scholar Mark Jones describes this effect as finding the poem is "over before it has begun", while according to writer Margaret Oliphant (1828–1897), Lucy "is dead before we so much as heard of her".

Lucy's "untrodden ways" are symbolic of both her physical isolation and the unknown details of her thoughts and life as well as her sense of mystery. The third quatrain is written with an economy intended to capture the simplicity the narrator sees in Lucy. Her femininity is described in girlish terms. This has drawn criticism from those who see the female icon, in the words of literary scholar John Woolford, "represented in Lucy by condemning her to death while denying her the actual or symbolic fulfillment of maternity". To evoke the "loveliness of body and spirit", a pair of complementary but paradoxical images are employed in the second stanza: the solitary, hidden violet juxtaposed to the publicly visible Venus, emblem of love and first star of evening. Wondering if Lucy more resembles the violet or the star, the critic Cleanth Brooks (1906–1994) concludes that while Wordsworth likely views her as "the single star, completely dominating [his] world, not arrogantly like the sun, but sweetly and modestly", the metaphor is a conventional compliment with only vague relevance. For Wordsworth, Lucy's appeal is closer to the violet and lies in her seclusion and her perceived affinity with nature.

Wordsworth acquired a copy of the antiquarian and churchman Thomas Percy's (1729–1811) collection of British ballads Reliques of Ancient English Poetry (1765) in Hamburg a few months before he began to compose the series. The influence of the traditional English folk ballad is evident in the metre, rhythm and structure of "She dwelt". It follows the variant ballad stanza a4–b3–a4–b3, and, in keeping with ballad tradition, tells a dramatic story. As Durrant observed, "To confuse the mode of the 'Lucy' poems with that of the love lyric is to overlook their structure, in which, as in the traditional ballad, a story is told as boldly and briefly as possible." Kenneth and Warren Ober compare the opening lines of "She dwelt" to the traditional ballad "Katharine Jaffray" and note similarities in rhythm and structure, as well as in theme and imagery:

"Katharine Jaffray"

There livd a lass in yonder dale,
And doun in yonder glen, O.
And Katherine Jaffray was her name,
Well known by many men, O.

"She dwelt"

She dwelt among the untrodden ways
Beside the springs of Dove,
A maid whom there were none to praise
And very few to love; (lines 1–4)

The narrator of the poem is less concerned with the experience of observing Lucy than with his reflections and meditations on his observations. Throughout the poem sadness and ecstasy are intertwined, a fact emphasised by the exclamation marks in the second and third verses. The critic Carl Woodring writes that "She dwelt" and the Lucy series can be read as elegiac, as "sober meditation[s] on death". He found that they have "the economy and the general air of epitaphs in the Greek Anthology... [I]f all elegies are mitigations of death, the Lucy poems are also meditations on simple beauty, by distance made more sweet and by death preserved in distance".

An early draft of "She dwelt" contained two stanzas which had been omitted from the first edition. The revisions exclude many of the images but emphasise the grief that the narrator experienced. The original version began with floral imagery, which was later cut:

My hope was one, from cities far,
Nursed on a lonesome heath;
Her lips were red as roses are,
Her hair a woodbine wreath.

A fourth stanza, also later removed, mentions Lucy's death: "But slow distemper checked her bloom / And on the Heath she died."

=== "I travelled among unknown men" ===
The last of the "Lucy poems" to be composed, "I travelled among unknown men", was the only one not included in the second edition of Lyrical Ballads. Although Wordsworth claimed that the poem was composed while he was still in Germany, it was in fact written in April 1801. Evidence for this later date comes from a letter Wordsworth wrote to Mary Hutchinson referring to "I travelled" as a newly created poem. In 1802, he instructed his printer to place "I travelled" immediately after "A slumber did my spirit seal" in Lyrical Ballads, but the poem was omitted. It was later published in Poems, in Two Volumes in 1807.

The poem has frequently been read as a declaration of Wordsworth's love for his native England and his determination not to live abroad again:

'Tis past, that melancholy dream!
Nor will I quit thy shore
A second time; for still I seem
To love thee more and more. (lines 5–8)

The first two stanzas seem to speak of the poet's personal experience, and a patriotic reading would reflect his appreciation and pride for the English landscape. The possibility remains, however, that Wordsworth is referring to England as a physical rather than a political entity, an interpretation that gains strength from the poem's connections to the other "Lucy poems".

Lucy only appears in the second half of the poem, where she is linked with the English landscape. As such, it seems as if nature joins with the narrator in mourning for her, and the reader is drawn into this mutual sorrow.

Although "I travelled" was written two years after the other poems in the series, it echoes the earlier verses in both tone and language. Wordsworth gives no hint as to the identity of Lucy, and although he stated in the preface to Lyrical Ballads that all the poems were "founded on fact", knowing the basis for the character of Lucy is not necessary to appreciate the poem and understand its sentiment. Similarly, no insight can be gained from determining the exact geographical location of the "springs of Dove"; in his youth, Wordsworth had visited springs of that name in Derbyshire, Patterdale and Yorkshire.

=== "Three years she grew in sun and shower" ===
"Three years she grew in sun and shower" was composed between 6 October and 28 December 1798. The poem depicts the relationship between Lucy and nature through a complex opposition of images. Antithetical couplings of words—"sun and shower", "law and impulse", "earth and heaven", "kindle and restrain"—are used to evoke the opposing forces inherent in nature. A conflict between nature and humanity is described, as each attempts to possess Lucy. The poem contains both epithalamic and elegiac characteristics; Lucy is shown as wedded to nature, while her human lover is left alone to mourn in the knowledge that death has separated her from humanity.

=== "A slumber did my spirit seal" ===
Written in spare language, "A slumber did my spirit seal" consists of two stanzas, each four lines long. The first stanza is built upon even, soporific movement in which figurative language conveys the nebulous image of a girl who "seemed a thing that could not feel / The touch of earthly years". The second maintains the quiet and even tone of the first but serves to undermine its sense of the eternal by revealing that Lucy has died and that the calmness of the first stanza represents death. The narrator's response to her death lacks bitterness or emptiness; instead he takes consolation from the fact that she is now beyond life's trials, and "at last ... in inanimate community with the earth's natural fixtures". The lifeless rocks and stones depicted in the concluding line convey the finality of Lucy's death.

== Grouping as a series ==
Although the "Lucy poems" share stylistic and thematic similarities, it was not Wordsworth but literary critics who first presented the five poems as a unified set called the "Lucy poems". The grouping was originally suggested by critic Thomas Powell in 1831 and later advocated by Margaret Oliphant in an 1871 essay. The 1861 Golden Treasury, compiled by the English historian Francis Palgrave (1788–1861), groups only four of the verses, omitting "Strange fits". The poems next appeared as a complete set of five in the collection of Wordsworth's poems by English poet and critic Matthew Arnold (1822–1888).

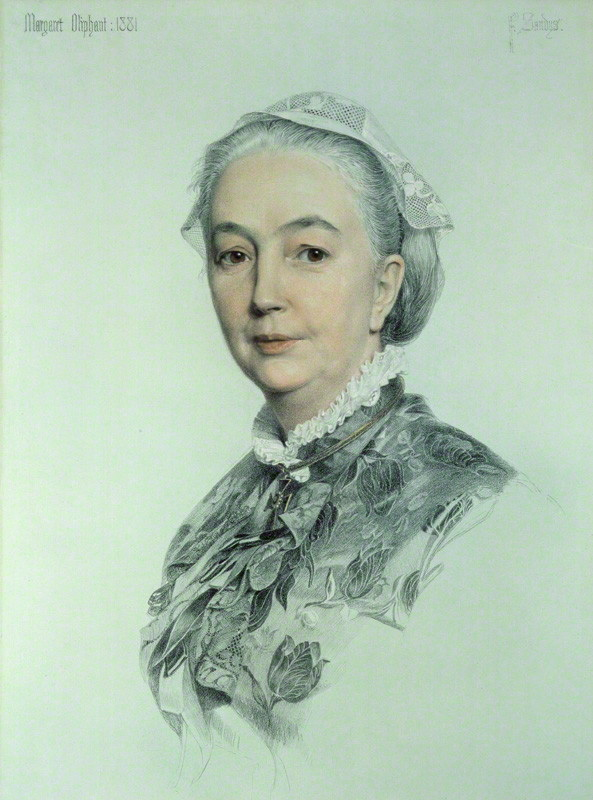
Frederick Augustus Sandys (1829–1904), Margaret Oliphant, chalk, 1881. In 1875, she was one of the first anthologists to group together the "Lucy poems".

The grouping and sequence of the "Lucy poems" has been a matter of debate in literary circles. Various critics have sought to add poems to the group; among those proposed over the years are "Alcaeus to Sappho", "Among all lovely things", "Lucy Gray", "Surprised by joy", "Tis said, that some have died for love", "Louisa", "Nutting", "Presentiments", "She was a Phantom of delight", "The Danish Boy", "The Two April Mornings", "To a Young Lady", and "Written in Very Early Youth". None of the proposals have met with widespread acceptance. The five poems included in the Lucy "canon" focus on similar themes of nature, beauty, separation and loss, and most follow the same basic ballad form. Literary scholar Mark Jones offers a general characterisation of a Lucy poem as "an untitled lyrical ballad that either mentions Lucy or is always placed with another poem that does, that either explicitly mentions her death or is susceptible of such a reading, and that is spoken by Lucy's lover."

With the exception of "A slumber", all of the poems mention Lucy by name. The decision to include this work is based in part on Wordsworth's decision to place it in close proximity to "Strange fits" and directly after "She dwelt" within Lyrical Ballads. In addition, "I travelled" was sent to the poet's childhood friend and later wife, Mary Hutchinson, with a note that said it should be "read after 'She dwelt'". Coleridge biographer J. Dykes Campbell records that Wordsworth instructed "I travelled" to be included directly following "A slumber", an arrangement that indicates a connection between the poems. Nevertheless, the question of inclusion is further complicated by Wordsworth's eventual retraction of these instructions and his omission of "I travelled" from the two subsequent editions of Lyrical Ballads.

The 1815 edition of Lyrical Ballads organised the poems into the Poems Founded on the Affections ("Strange fits", "She dwelt", and "I travelled") and Poems of the Imagination ("Three years she grew" and "A slumber"). This arrangement allowed the two dream-based poems ("Strange fits" and "A slumber") to frame the series and to represent the speaker's different sets of experiences over the course of the longer narrative. In terms of chronology, "I travelled" was written last, and thus also served as a symbolic conclusion—both emotionally and thematically—to the "Lucy poems".

== Interpretation ==
=== Nature ===
According to critic Norman Lacey, Wordsworth built his reputation as a "poet of nature". Early works, such as "Tintern Abbey", can be viewed as odes to his experience of nature. His poems can also be seen as lyrical meditations on the fundamental character of the natural world. Wordsworth said that, as a youth, nature stirred "an appetite, a feeling and a love", but by the time he wrote Lyrical Ballads, it evoked "the still sad music of humanity".

The five "Lucy poems" are often interpreted as representing Wordsworth's opposing views of nature as well as meditations on the cycle of life. They describe a variety of relationships between humanity and nature. For example, Lucy can be seen as a connection between humanity and nature, as a "boundary being, nature sprite and human, yet not quite either. She reminds us of the traditional mythical person who lives, ontologically, an intermediate life, or mediates various realms of existence." Although the poems evoke a sense of loss, they also hint at the completeness of Lucy's life—she was raised by nature and survives in the memories of others. She became, in the opinion of the American poet and writer David Ferry (b. 1924), "not so much a human being as a sort of compendium of nature", while "her death was right, after all, for by dying she was one with the natural processes that made her die, and fantastically ennobled thereby".

Cleanth Brooks writes that "Strange fits" presents "Kind Nature's gentlest boon", "Three years" its duality, and "A slumber" the clutter of natural object. Other scholars see "She dwelt", along with "I travelled", as representing nature's "rustication and disappearance". Mahoney views "Three years" as describing a masculine, benevolent nature similar to a creator deity. Although nature shapes Lucy over time and she is seen as part of nature herself, the poem shifts abruptly when she dies. Lucy appears to be eternal, like nature itself. Regardless, she becomes part of the surrounding landscape in life, and her death only verifies this connection.

The series presents nature as a force by turns benevolent and malign. It is shown at times to be oblivious to and uninterested in the safety of humanity. Hall argues, "In all of these poems, nature would seem to betray the heart that loves her". The imagery used to evoke these notions serves to separate Lucy from everyday reality. The literary theorist Frances Ferguson (b. 1947) notes that the "flower similes and metaphors become impediments rather than aids to any imaginative visualization of a woman; the flowers do not simply locate themselves in Lucy's cheeks, they expand to absorb the whole of her ... The act of describing seems to have lost touch with its goal—description of Lucy."

=== Death ===
The poems Wordsworth wrote while in Goslar focus on the dead and dying. The "Lucy poems" follow this trend, and often fail to delineate the difference between life and death. Each creates an ambiguity between the sublime and nothingness, as they attempt to reconcile the question of how to convey the death of a girl intimately connected to nature. They describe a rite of passage from innocent childhood to corrupted maturity and, according to Hartman, "center on a death or a radical change of consciousness which is expressed in semi-mythical form; and they are, in fact, Wordsworth's nearest approach to a personal myth." The narrator is affected greatly by Lucy's death and cries out in "She dwelt" of "the difference to me!". Yet in "A slumber" he is spared from trauma by sleep.

The reader's experience of Lucy is filtered through the narrator's perception. Her death suggests that nature can bring pain to all, even to those who loved her. According to the British classical and literary scholar H. W. Garrod (1878–1960), "The truth is, as I believe, that between Lucy's perfection in Nature and her death there is, for Wordsworth, really no tragic antithesis at all." Hartman expands on this view to extend the view of death and nature to art in general: "Lucy, living, is clearly a guardian spirit, not of one place but of all English places ... while Lucy, dead, has all nature for her monument. The series is a deeply humanized version of the death of Pan, a lament on the decay of English natural feeling. Wordsworth fears that the very spirit presiding over his poetry is ephemeral, and I think he refuses to distinguish between its death in him and its historical decline."

== Critical assessment ==
The first mention of the poems came from Dorothy, in a letter sent to Coleridge in December 1798. Of "Strange fits", she wrote, "[this] next poem is a favourite of mine—i.e. of me Dorothy—". The first recorded mention of any of the "Lucy poems" (outside of notes by either William or Dorothy) occurred after the April 1799 death of Coleridge's son Berkeley. Coleridge was then living in Germany, and received the news through a letter from his friend Thomas Poole, who in his condolences mentioned Wordsworth's "A slumber":

But I cannot truly say that I grieve—I am perplexed—I am sad—and a little thing, a very trifle would make me weep; but for the death of the Baby I have not wept!—Oh! this strange, strange, strange Scene-shifter, Death! that giddies one with insecurity, & so unsubstantiates the living Things that one has grasped and handled!—/ Some months ago Wordsworth transmitted to me a most sublime Epitaph / whether it had any reality, I cannot say.—Most probably, in some gloomier moment he had fancied the moment in which his sister might die.

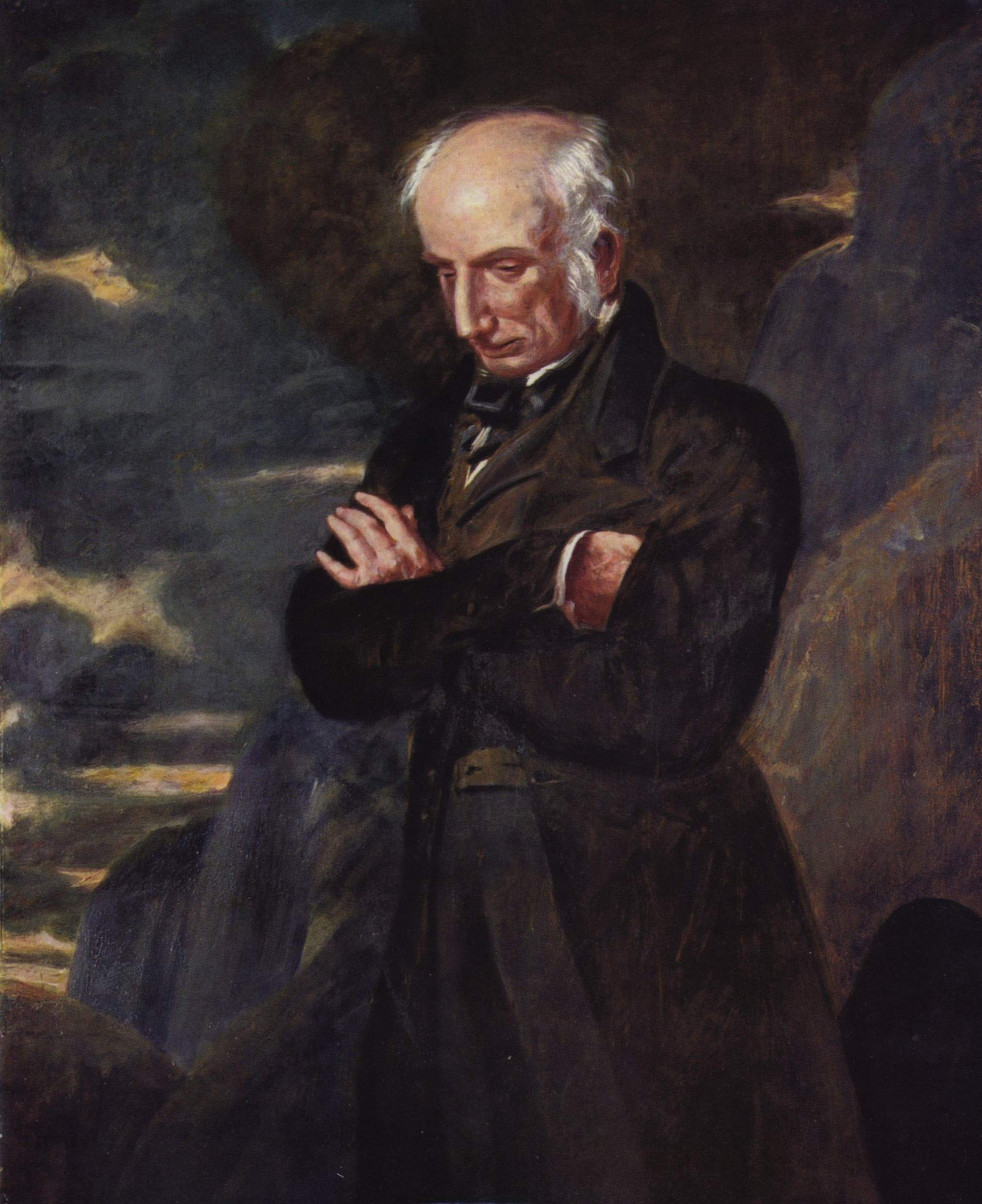
Benjamin Haydon, Wordsworth on Helvellyn, 1842

Later, the essayist Charles Lamb (1775–1834) wrote to Wordsworth in 1801 to say that "She dwelt" was one of his favourites from Lyrical Ballads. Likewise, the Romantic poet John Keats (1795–1821) praised the poem. To the diarist and writer Henry Crabb Robinson (1775–1867), "She dwelt" gave "the powerful effect of the loss of a very obscure object upon one tenderly attached to it—the opposition between the apparent strength of the passion and the insignificance of the object is delightfully conceived."

Besides word of mouth and opinions in letters, there were only a few published contemporary reviews. The writer and journalist John Stoddart (1773–1856), in a review of Lyrical Ballads, described "Strange fits" and "She dwelt" as "the most singular specimens of unpretending, yet irresistible pathos". An anonymous review of Poems in Two Volumes in 1807 had a less positive opinion about "I travell'd": "Another string of flat lines about Lucy is succeeded by an ode to Duty". Critic Francis Jeffrey (1773–1850) claimed that, in "Strange fits", "Mr Wordsworth, however, has thought fit to compose a piece, illustrating this copious subject by one single thought. A lover trots away to see his mistress one fine evening, staring all the way at the moon: when he comes to her door, 'O mercy! to myself I cried, / If Lucy should be dead!' And there the poem ends!" On "A slumber did my spirit seal", Wordsworth's friend Thomas Powell wrote that the poem "stands by itself, and is without title prefixed, yet we are to know, from the penetration of Mr. Wordsworth's admirers, that it is a sequel to the other deep poems that precede it, and is about one Lucy, who is dead. From the table of contents, however, we are informed by the author that it is about 'A Slumber;' for this is the actual title which he has condescended to give it, to put us out of pain as to what it is about."

Many Victorian critics appreciated the emotion of the "Lucy poems" and focused on "Strange fits". John Wilson, a personal friend of both Wordsworth and Coleridge, described the poem in 1842 as "powerfully pathetic". In 1849, critic Rev. Francis Jacox, writing under the pseudonym "Parson Frank", remarked that "Strange fits" contained "true pathos. We are moved to our soul's centre by sorrow expressed as that is; for, without periphrasis or wordy anguish, without circumlocution of officious and obtrusive, and therefore, artificial grief; the mourner gives sorrow words... But he does it in words as few as may be: how intense their beauty!" A few years later, John Wright, an early Wordsworth commentator, described the contemporary perception that "Strange fits" had a "deep but subdued and 'silent fervour'". Other reviewers emphasised the importance of "She dwelt among the untrodden ways", including Scottish writer William Angus Knight (1836–1916), when he described the poem as an "incomparable twelve lines".

At the beginning of the 20th century, literary critic David Rannie praised the poems as a whole: "that strange little lovely group, which breathe a passion unfamiliar to Wordsworth, and about which he—so ready to talk about the genesis of his poems—has told us nothing [...] Let a poet keep some of his secrets: we need not grudge him the privacy when the poetry is as beautiful as this; when there is such celebration of girlhood, love, and death [...] The poet's sense of loss is sublime in its utter simplicity. He finds harmony rather than harshness in the contrast between the illusion of love and the fact of death." Later critics focused on the importance of the poems to Wordsworth's poetic technique. Durrant argued that "The four 'Lucy' poems which appeared in the 1800 edition of Lyrical Ballads are worth careful attention because they represent the clearest examples of the success of Wordsworth's experiment." Alan Grob (1932–2007) focused less on the unity that the poems represent and believed that "the principal importance of the 'Matthew' and 'Lucy' poems, apart from their intrinsic achievement, substantial as that is, is in suggesting the presence of seeds of discontent even in a period of seemingly assured faith that makes the sequence of developments in the history of Wordsworth's thought a more orderly, evolving pattern than the chronological leaps between stages would seem to imply."

Later critics de-emphasised the significance of the poems in Wordsworth's artistic development. Hunter Davies (b. 1936) concluded that their impact relies more on their popularity than importance to Wordsworth's poetic career. Davies went on to claim, "The poems about Lucy are perhaps Wordsworth's best-known work which he did in Germany, along with 'Nutting' and the Matthew poems, but the most important work was the beginning of The Prelude" (emphasis in original). Some critics emphasised the importance behind Lucy as a figure, including Geoffrey Hartman (b. 1929), when he claimed, "It is in the Lucy poems that the notion of spirit of place, and particularly English spirit of place, reaches its purest form." Writer and poet Meena Alexander (b. 1951) believed that the character of Lucy "is the impossible object of the poet's desire, an iconic representation of the Romantic feminine."

== Parodies and allusions ==
The "Lucy poems" have been parodied numerous times since their first publication. These were generally intended to ridicule the simplification of textual complexities and deliberate ambiguities in poetry. They also questioned the way many 19th-century critics sought to establish definitive readings. According to Jones, such parodies commented in a "meta-critical" manner and themselves present an alternative mode of criticism. Among the more notable is the one by Samuel Taylor Coleridge's son Hartley Coleridge (1796–1849), called "On William Wordsworth" or simply "Imitation", as in the 1827 version published for The Inspector magazine ("He lived amidst th' untrodden ways / To Rydal Lake that lead; / A Bard whom there were none to praise / And very few to read" lines 1–4). Parody also appears in the 1888 murder-mystery reading of the poem by Victorian author Samuel Butler (1835–1902). Butler believed Wordsworth's use of the phrase "the difference to me!" was overly terse, and remarked that the poet was "most careful not to explain the nature of the difference which the death of Lucy will occasion him to be ... The superficial reader takes it that he is very sorry she was dead ... but he has not said this." Not every work referring to the "Lucy poems" is intended to mock, however; the novelist and essayist Mary Shelley (1797–1851) drew upon the poems to comment on and re-imagine the Romantic portrayal of femininity.

== Settings ==
The "Lucy poems" (omitting "I travelled among unknown men" but adding "Among all lovely things") have been set for voice and piano by the composer Nigel Dodd. The settings were first performed at St George's, Brandon Hill, Bristol, in October 1995 at a concert marking the bicentenary of the first meeting of Wordsworth and Coleridge.

Among settings of individual poems is Benjamin Britten's "Lucy" ("I travelled among unknown men") composed in 1926.

Three of the five poems were set to music and recorded by the orchestral pop band The Divine Comedy on their album Liberation.
