= Three years she grew in sun and shower =

Poem by William Wordsworth

"Three years she grew in sun and shower" is a poem composed in 1798 by the English poet William Wordsworth, and first published in the second edition of Lyrical Ballads (1800), which was co-written with his friend and fellow poet Samuel Taylor Coleridge. As one of the five poems that make up the "Lucy series," the work describes the relationship between Lucy and nature using words and sentiments. The author creates an impression of the indifference of nature as the poem progresses. The care with which Nature had sculpted Lucy, and then casually let her "race" end, reflects Wordsworth's view of the harsh reality of life. Although Nature is indifferent, it also cares for Lucy enough to both sculpt and mould her into its own. Wordsworth valued connections to nature above all else. The poem thus contains both epithalamic and elegiac characteristics; the marriage described is between Lucy and nature, while her human lover is left to mourn in the knowledge that death has separated her from mankind, and she will forever now be with nature.

== Bibliography ==
- Eilenberg, Susan. Strange Power of Speech: Wordsworth, Coleridge and Literary Possession. Oxford University Press USA, 1992. ISBN 0-19-506856-4
- Grob, Alan. The Philosophic Mind: A Study of Wordsworth's Poetry and Thought 1797–1805. Columbus: Ohio State University, 1973. ISBN 0-8142-0178-4
- Jones, Mark. The 'Lucy Poems': A Case Study in Literary Knowledge. Toronto:The University of Toronto Press, 1995. ISBN 0-8020-0434-2
