= River Dove, North Yorkshire =

River in North Yorkshire, England

River Dove
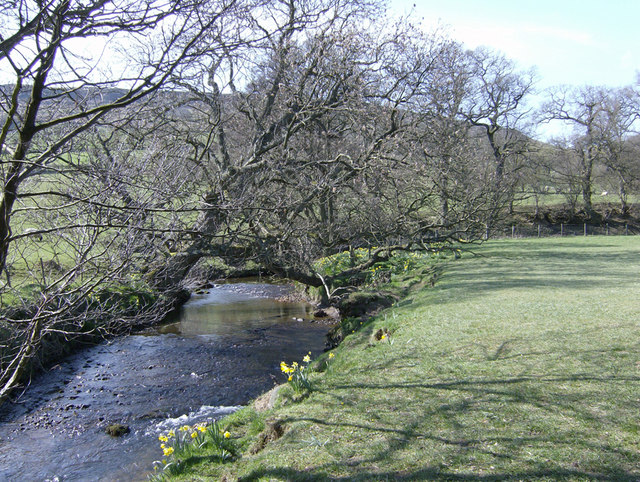
- The River Dove near Farndale

Location
- Country: England

Physical characteristics
- Source
  - location: Farndale Moor, North Yorkshire
  - coordinates: 54°24′24″N 1°2′23″W
  - elevation: 372 metres (1,220 ft)
- Mouth
  - location: River Rye near Salton
  - coordinates: 54°12′7″N 0°54′35″W
  - elevation: 24 metres (79 ft)
- Length: 30.22 km (18.78 mi)
- Basin size: 59.2 km^{2} (22.9 sq mi)

The River Dove is a river in North Yorkshire, England. It rises on the North York Moors and flows south to join the River Rye, itself a tributary of the River Derwent. The upper valley of the river is known as Farndale. The name is of Brittonic Celtic origin, meaning "dark river". Its principal tributary is the Hodge Beck.

== Course ==
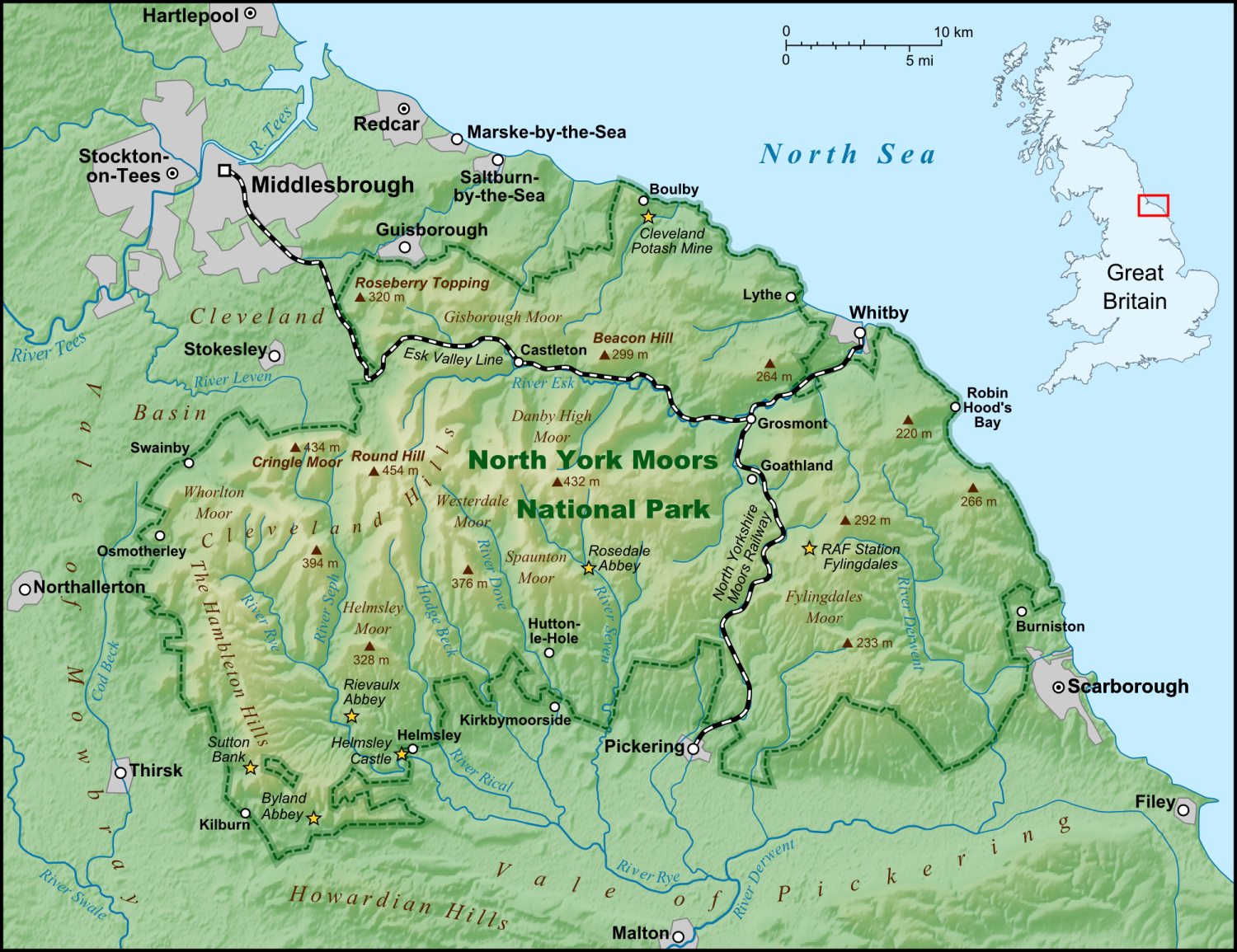
The River Dove on the map of the North York Moors upland area

The river flows through Farndale south-east past several small settlements to Church Houses. Here it turns south and continues meandering past Low Mill to Lowna. At Gillamoor it heads south-east again past Hutton-le-Hole before returning southwards past Ravenswick and to the east of Kirkbymoorside. It continues past Keldholme and Kirkby Mills to Great Edstone. From there it flows south south-east to where it joins the River Rye in the Vale of Pickering near the village of Salton.

The Environment Agency have a gauging station at Kirkby Mills where the average low river level is 0.2 metres (0.66 ft) and the high river level 0.52 metres (1.7 ft) with a record high level of 2.45 metres (8 ft). The record high level shows the river can be susceptible to flooding.

== Geography ==
She dwelt among the untrodden ways (The Lost Love)

She dwelt among the untrodden ways
Beside the springs of Dove;
A maid whom there were none to praise,
And very few to love.

A violet by a mossy stone
Half hidden from the eye!
- Fair as a star, when only one
Is shining in the sky.

She lived unknown, and few could know
When Lucy ceased to be;
But she is in her grave, and O
The difference to me!

Both the River Dove and Hodge Beck are partly swallowed by the local limestone aquifer and issue again further down the valley. During summer months the bed of Hodge Beck often runs dry. The soil in the valley floor is loam over clay. The bedrock is Jurassic limestone with some sandstone.

== Leisure ==
Between Church Houses and Low Mill in Farndale, the River Dove is popular with walkers due to its picturesque setting. The banks of the river are known for their wild daffodils which are rumoured to have been planted by monks from nearby Rievaulx Abbey. Along this part of the valley is The Farndale Daffodil Walk, an 11.4-kilometre (7.1 mi) circular walk starting at Lowna Bridge.

== In literature ==
William Wordsworth's poem, She dwelt among the untrodden ways from the Lucy series of poems refers to the eponymous Lucy living close to the "springs of Dove", a possible reference to the source of the river, but could equally pertain to the either the River Dove in Derbyshire or in Westmorland, as Wordsworth knew of all three of them.

== Lists ==
=== Tributaries ===
- Middle Heads
- Gill Beck
- Gill Dike
- Oak Beck
- Low Dike
- Green Slack Dike
- Fish Beck
- West Gill Beck
- Lapa Green Dike
- Yealand Rigg Slack
- Shortsha Beck
- Hodge Beck
- Carr Dike

=== Settlements ===
- Church Houses
- Low Mill
- Lowna
- Gillamoor
- Hutton-le-Hole
- Ravenswick
- Kirkbymoorside
- Keldholme
- Kirkby Mills
- Great Edstone
- Salton

=== Crossings ===
- Thorn Wath Bridge, Church Houses
- Mill Bridge (foot)
- Waste Bridge, Low Mill
- Mercer's Bridge (foot)
- Dale End Bridge (foot)
- Birch Hagg Bridge
- Lowna Bridge, Lowna
- Yoadwath Ford
- Unnamed road, Ravenswick
- Keldholme Bridge, Keldholme
- A170, Kirkbymoorside
- Unnamed road near Salton

== Gallery ==
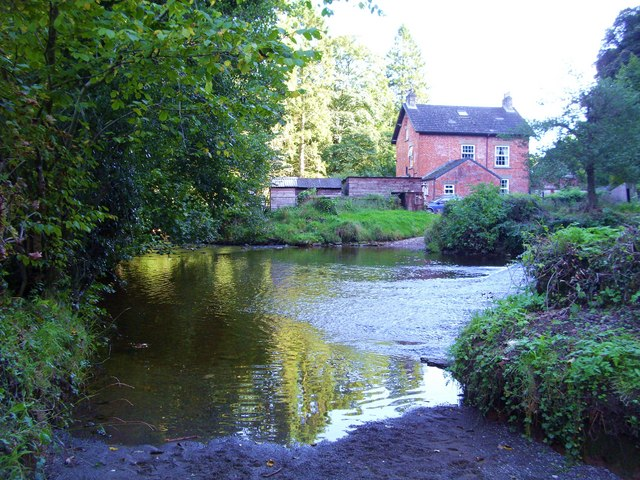
Ford through the River Dove

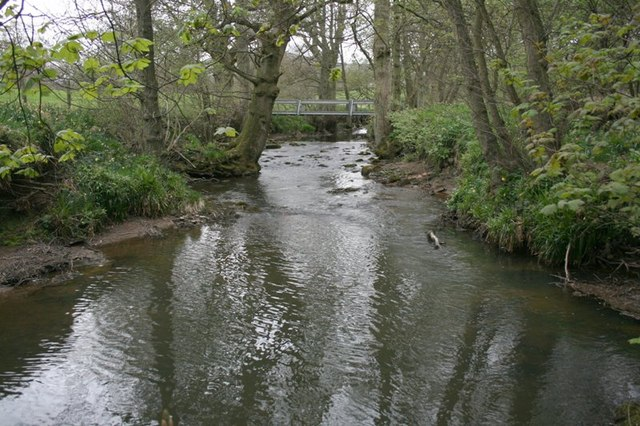
Footbridge Over the River Dove

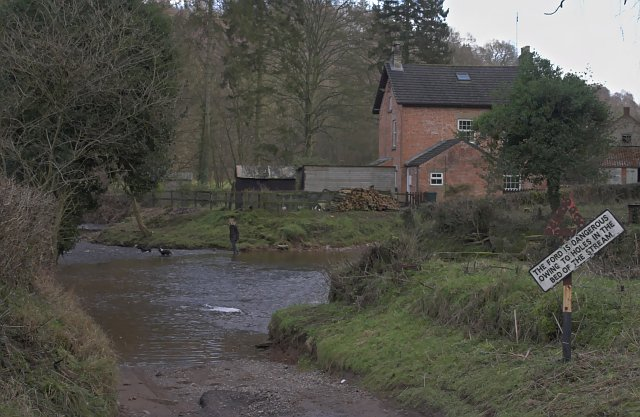
Ford on the River Dove

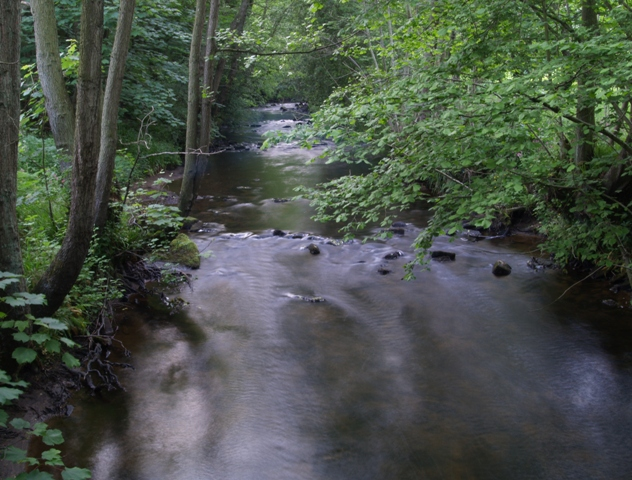
River Dove near Birch Hagg House

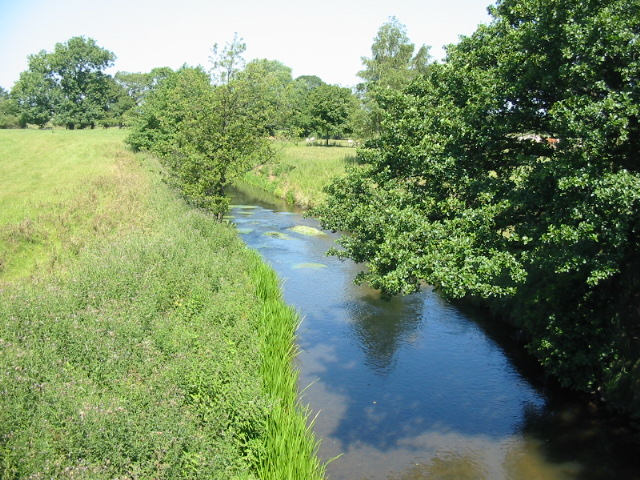
Fishing Beat on the River Dove near Sparrow Hall

== Sources ==
- Ordnance Survey Explorer Map OL26
- Google Earth
