= She dwelt among the untrodden ways =

Poem by William Wordsworth

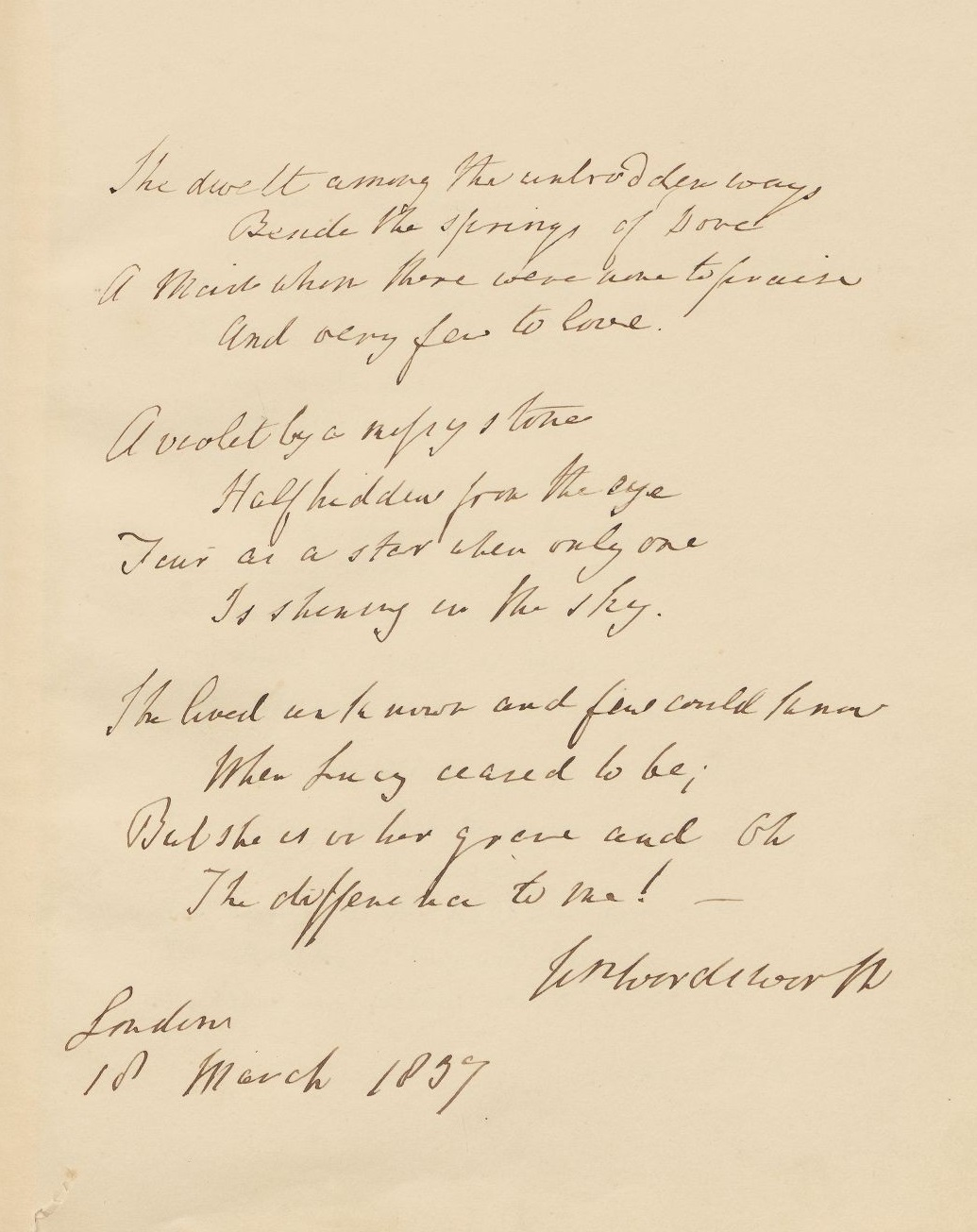
1837 manuscript of "She dwelt among the untrodden ways"

A reading of "She dwelt among the untrodden ways"

"She Dwelt Among the Untrodden Ways" is a three-stanza poem written by the English Romantic poet William Wordsworth in 1798 when he was 28 years old. The verse was first printed in the second edition of Lyrical Ballads (1800), a volume of Wordsworth's and Samuel Taylor Coleridge's poems that marked a climacteric in the English Romantic movement. The poem is the best known of Wordsworth's series of five works which comprise his "Lucy" series, and was a favorite amongst early readers. It was composed both as a meditation on his own feelings of loneliness and loss, and as an ode to the beauty and dignity of an idealized woman who lived unnoticed by all others except by the poet himself. The title line implies Lucy lived unknown and remote, both physically and intellectually. The poet's subject's isolated sensitivity expresses a characteristic aspect of Romantic expectations of the human, and especially of the poet's condition.

According to the literary critic Kenneth Ober, the poem describes the "growth, perfection, and death" of Lucy. Whether Wordsworth has declared his love for her is left ambivalent, and even whether she had been aware of the poet's affection is unsaid. However the poet's feelings remain unrequited, and his final verse reveals that the subject of his affections has died alone. Lucy's "untrodden ways" are symbolic to the poet of both her physical isolation and the unknown details of her mind and life. In the poem, Wordsworth is concerned not so much with his observation of Lucy, but with his experience when reflecting on her death.

== Structure and style ==
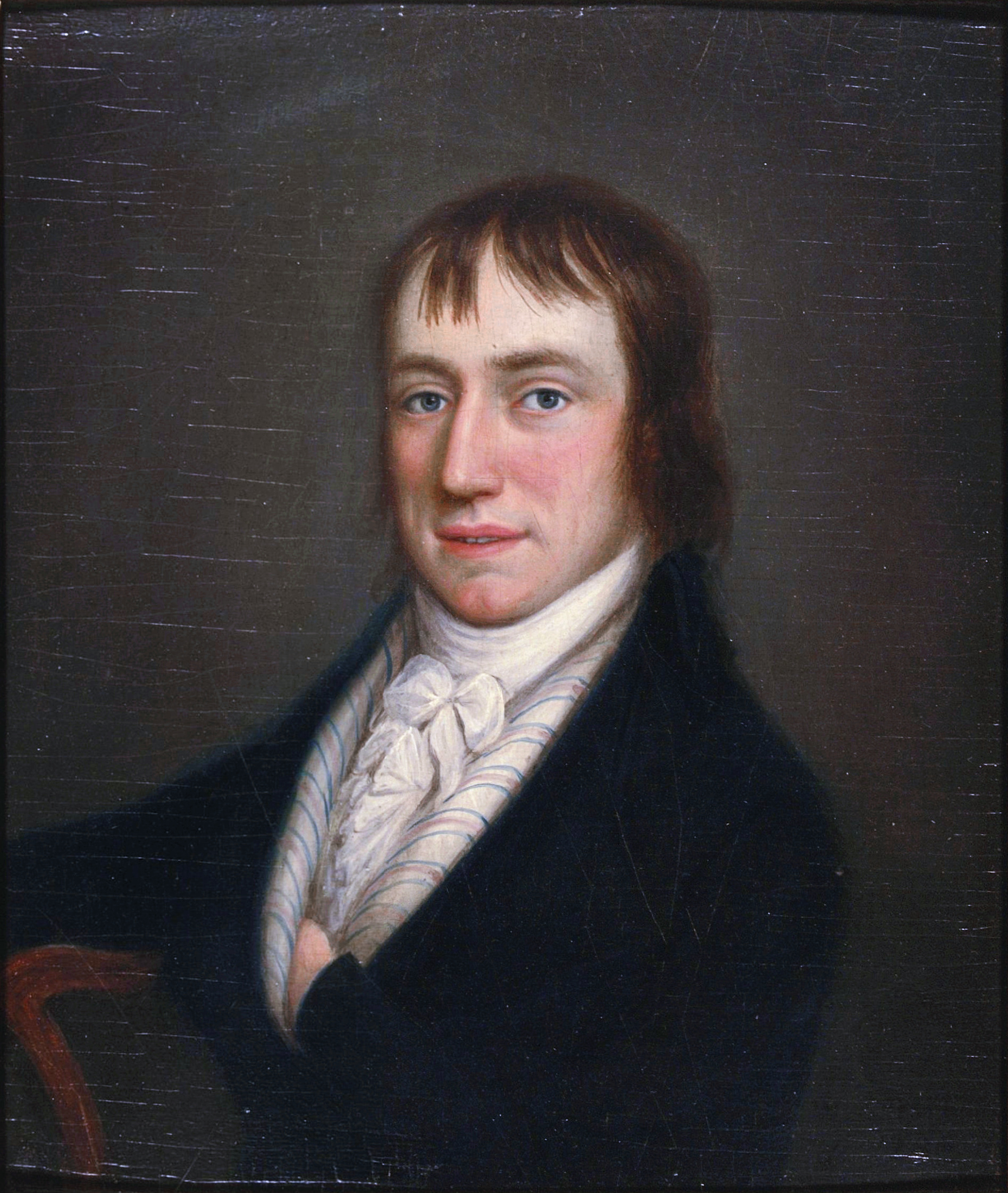
William Wordsworth, author of "She Dwelt among the Untrodden Ways"

"She dwelt among the untrodden ways" consists of three quatrains, and describes Lucy who lives in solitude near the source of the River Dove. In order to convey the dignity and unaffected flowerlike naturalness of his subject, Wordsworth uses simple language, mainly words of one syllable. In the opening quatrain, he describes the isolated and untouched area where Lucy lived, while her innocence is explored in the second, during which her beauty is compared to that of a hidden flower. The final stanza laments Lucy's early and lonesome death, which only he notices.

Throughout the poem, sadness and ecstasy are intertwined, emphasised by the exclamation marks in the second and third verses. The effectiveness of the concluding line in the concluding stanza has divided critics and has variously been described as "a masterstroke of understatement" and overtly sentimental. Wordsworth's voice remains largely muted, and he was equally silent about the poem and series throughout his life. This fact was often mentioned by 19th century critics, however they disagreed as to its value. A critic, writing in 1851, remarked on the poem's "deep but subdued and silent devour."

This is written with an economy and spareness intended to capture the simplicity the poet sees in Lucy. Lucy's femininity is described in the verse in girlish terms, a fact that has drawn criticism from some critics that see a female icon, in the words of John Woolford "represented in Lucy by condemning her to death while denying her the actual or symbolic fulfillment of maternity". To evoke the "loveliness of body and spirit", a pair of complementary but opposite images are employed in the second stanza: a solitary violet, unseen and hidden, and Venus, emblem of love, and the first star of evening, public and visible to all. Wondering which Lucy most resembled—the violet or the star—the critic Cleanth Brooks concluded that although Wordsworth likely viewed her as "the single star, completely dominating [his] world, not arrogantly like the sun, but sweetly and modestly". Brooks considered the metaphor only vaguely relevant, and a conventional and anomalous complement. For Wordsworth, Lucy's appeal is closer to the violet and lies in her seclusion, and her perceived affinity with nature.

Wordsworth purchased a copy of Thomas Percy's collection of British ballad material "Reliques of Ancient English Poetry" in Hamburg a few months before he began to compose the Lucy series. The influence of traditional English folk ballad is evident in the meter, rhythm, and structure of the poem. She Dwelt among the Untrodden Ways follows the variant ballad stanza a4—b3—a4 b3, and in keeping with ballad tradition seeks to tell its story in a dramatic manner. As the critic Kenneth Ober observed, "To confuse the mode of the 'Lucy' poems with that of the love lyric is to overlook their structure, in which, as in the traditional ballad, a story is told as boldly and briefly as possible." Ober compares the opening lines of She Dwelt among the Untrodden Ways to the traditional ballad Katharine Jaffray and notes the similarities in rhythm and structure, as well as in theme and imagery:

There livd a lass in yonder dale,
And doun in yonder glen, O.
And Katherine Jaffray was her name,
Well known by many men, O.

According to the critic Carl Woodring, "She Dwelt" can also be read as an elegy. He views the poem and the Lucy series in general as elegiac "in the sense of sober meditation on death or a subject related to death", and that they have "the economy and the general air of epitaphs in the Greek Anthology ... if all elegies are mitigations of death, the Lucy poems are also meditations on simple beauty, by distance made more sweet and by death preserved in distance".

One passage was originally intended for the poem "Michael"–"Renew'd their search begun where from Dove Crag / Ill home for bird so gentle / they look'd down / On Deep-dale Head, and Brothers-water".

== Lucy ==
She dwelt among the untrodden ways (The Lost Love)

She dwelt among the untrodden ways
Beside the springs of Dove;
A maid whom there were none to praise,
And very few to love.

A violet by a mossy stone
Half hidden from the eye!
- Fair as a star, when only one
Is shining in the sky.

She lived unknown, and few could know
When Lucy ceased to be;
But she is in her grave, and O
The difference to me!

—

Wordsworth wrote his series of "Lucy" poems during a stay with his sister Dorothy in Hamburg, Germany, between October 1798 and April 1801. The real life identity of Lucy has never been identified, and it is probable that she was not modeled on any one historical person. Wordsworth himself never addressed the matter of her persona, and was reticent about commenting on the series. Although great detail is known of the circumstances and details of Wordsworth's life, from the time he spent during his stay in Germany comparatively little record survives. Only one known mention from the poet that references the series survives, and that mentions the series only, and not any of the individual verses.

The literary historian Kenneth Johnson concluded that Lucy was created as the personification of Wordsworth's muse,

and the group as a whole is a series of invocations to a Muse feared dead. As epitaphs, they are not sad, a very inadequate word to describe them, but breathlessly, almost aware of what such a loss would mean to the speaker: 'oh, the difference to me!'

Writing in the mid-19th century, Thomas De Quincey said that Wordsworth,

always preserved a mysterious silence on the subject of that 'Lucy', repeatedly alluded to or apostrophised in his poems, and I have heard, from gossiping people about Hawkshead, some snatches of tragic story, which, after all, might be an idle semi-fable, improved out of slight materials.

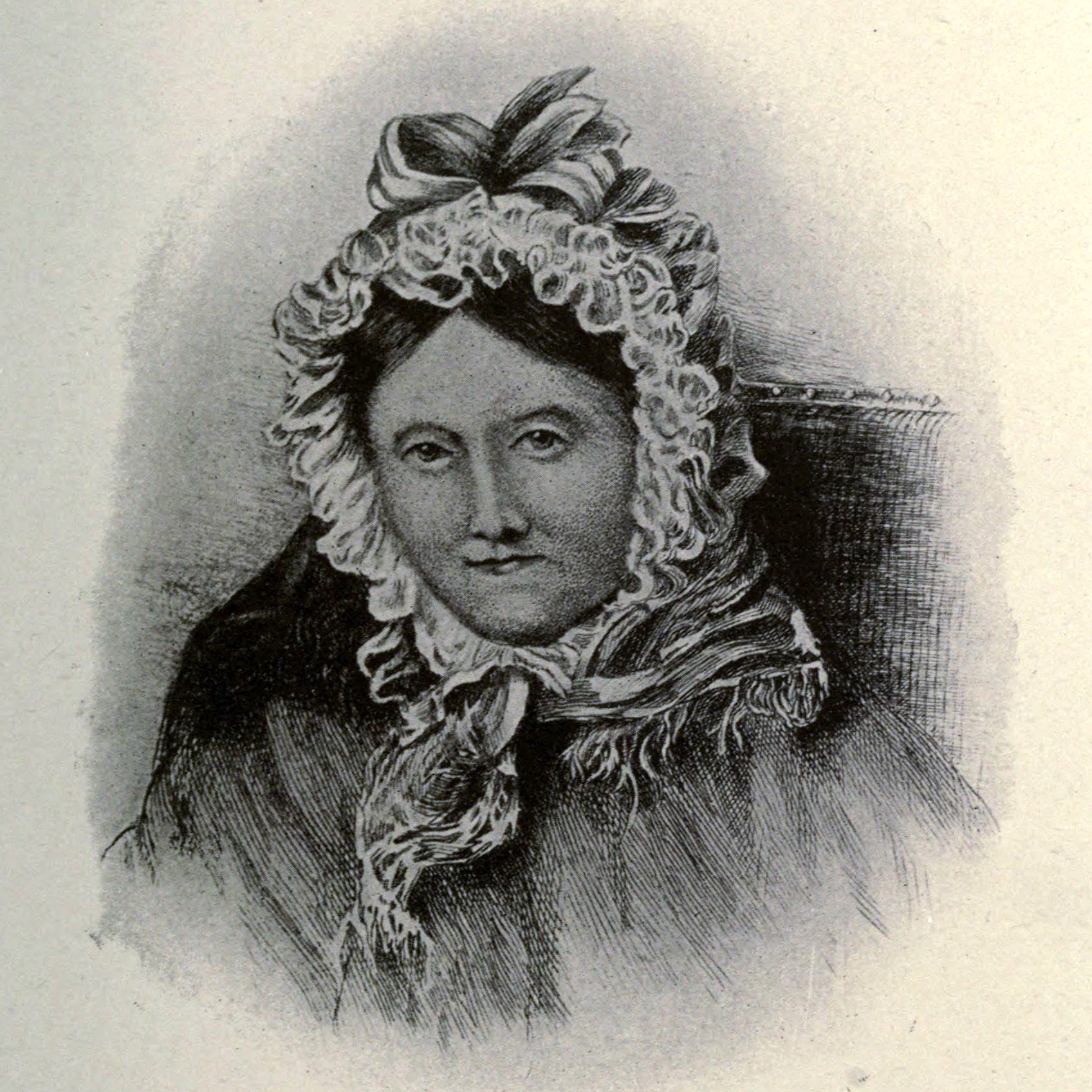
Pencil drawing of William's sister Dorothy Wordsworth in later life.

Lucy's identity has been the subject of much speculation, and some have guessed that the poems are an attempt by Wordsworth to voice his affection for Dorothy; this line of thought reasoning that the poems dramatise Wordsworth's feelings of grief for her inevitable death. Soon after the series was completed, Coleridge wrote, "Some months ago Wordsworth transmitted to me a most sublime Epitaph / whether it had any reality, I cannot say. - Most probably, in some gloomier moment he had fancied the moment in which his Sister might die."

Reflecting on the importance and relevance of Lucy's identity, the 19th-century literary critic Frederic Myers said, "Here it was that the memory of some emotion prompted the lines on Lucy. Of the history of that emotion, he has told us nothing; I forbear, therefore, to inquire concerning it, or even to speculate. That it was to the poet's honour, I do not doubt; but who ever learned such secrets rightly? Or who should wish to learn? It is best to leave the sanctuary of all hearts inviolate, and to respect the reserve not only of the living but of the dead. Of these poems, almost alone, Wordsworth in his autobiographical notes has said nothing whatever." According to Karl Kroeber,

Wordsworth's Lucy possesses a double existence, her actual, historical existence and her idealised existence in the poet's mind. The latter is created out of the former but neither an abstraction nor a conceptualisation, because the idealised Lucy is at least as "concrete" as the actual Lucy. In the poem, Lucy is both actual and idealised, but her actuality is relevant only insofar as it makes manifest the significance implicit in the actual girl.

Lucy is thought by others to represent his childhood friend Peggy Hutchinson, with whom he was in love before her early death in 1796—Wordsworth later married Peggy's sister, Mary.

== Place among the 'Lucy' series ==
Wordsworth established himself, according to the critic Norman Lacey, as a 'poet of nature' in his volume Lyrical Ballads in which "She Dwelt" first appeared. Early works, such as Tintern Abbey, can be seen as an ode to his experience of nature (though he preferred to avoid this interpretation), or as a lyrical meditation on the fundamental character of the natural world. Wordsworth later recalled that as a youth nature once stirred in him, "an appetite, a feeling and a love", but by the time he wrote "Lyrical Ballads", it evoked "the still sad music of humanity".

The five 'Lucy' poems are often interpreted as representing both his apposing views of nature and a meditation on natural cycle of life. "Strange fits" presents "Kind Nature's gentlest boon", "Three years" its duality, and "A slumber", according to the American literary critic Cleanth Brooks, the clutter of natural object. In Jones view, "She dwelt", along with "I travelled", represents its "rustication and disappearance".

== Parodies ==
"She dwelt.." has been parodied numerous times since it was first published. In part, parodies of earlier works were intended to remark on the simplification of textual complexities and deliberate ambiguities in poetry, and on the way many 19th-century critics sought to establish a 'definitive' reasonings. According to Jones, such parodies sought to comment in a "meta-critical" manner, and to present an alternative mode of criticism to the then mainstream mode.

Among the more notable are those by Hartley Coleridge in 1834 ("A Bard whom there were none to praise, / And very few to read"), and Samuel Butler's 1888 murder-mystery reading of the poem. Butler believed Wordsworth's use of the phrase "the difference to me!" was overtly terse, and remarked that the poet was "most careful not to explain the nature of the difference which the death of Lucy will occasion him to be ... The superficial reader takes it that he is very sorry she was dead ... but he has not said this."

These parodies were intended to question definitive interpretation of the verse, and highlight its indeterminacies.

== Bibliography ==
- Brooks, Cleanth. Irony as a Principle of Structure. In Zabel, Morton D. (ed): Literary Opinion in America. New York: Harper, 2nd edition, 1951.
- Kroeber, Karl. The Artifice of Reality: Poetic Style in Wordsworth, Foscolo, Keats, and Leopardi. Madison: University of Wisconsin, 1964.
- Johnston, Kenneth. The Hidden Wordsworth: Poet, Lover, Rebel, Spy. W. W. Norton & Company, 1998. ISBN 0-393-04623-0
- Jones, Mark. The 'Lucy Poems': A Case Study in Literary Knowledge. Toronto:The University of Toronto Press, 1995. ISBN 0-8020-0434-2
- Lacey, Norman. Wordsworths View Of Nature. Cambridge: University Press. 1948.
- Murray, Roger N. Wordsworth's Style: Figures and Themes in the Lyrical Ballads of 1800. Lincoln: University of Nebraska Press, 1967.
- Rolfe, William J. William Wordsworth, Select Poems of William Wordsworth. New York: American Book, 1889.
- Slakey, Roger L. "At Zero: A Reading of Wordsworth's 'She Dwelt among the Untrodden Ways'". SEL: Studies in English Literature 1500–1900. Volume 12, issue 4, Autumn, 1972. 629–638.
- Woodring, Carl. Wordsworth. Boston: Houghton Mifflin, 1965.
