= I travelled among unknown men =

1801 poem by William Wordsworth

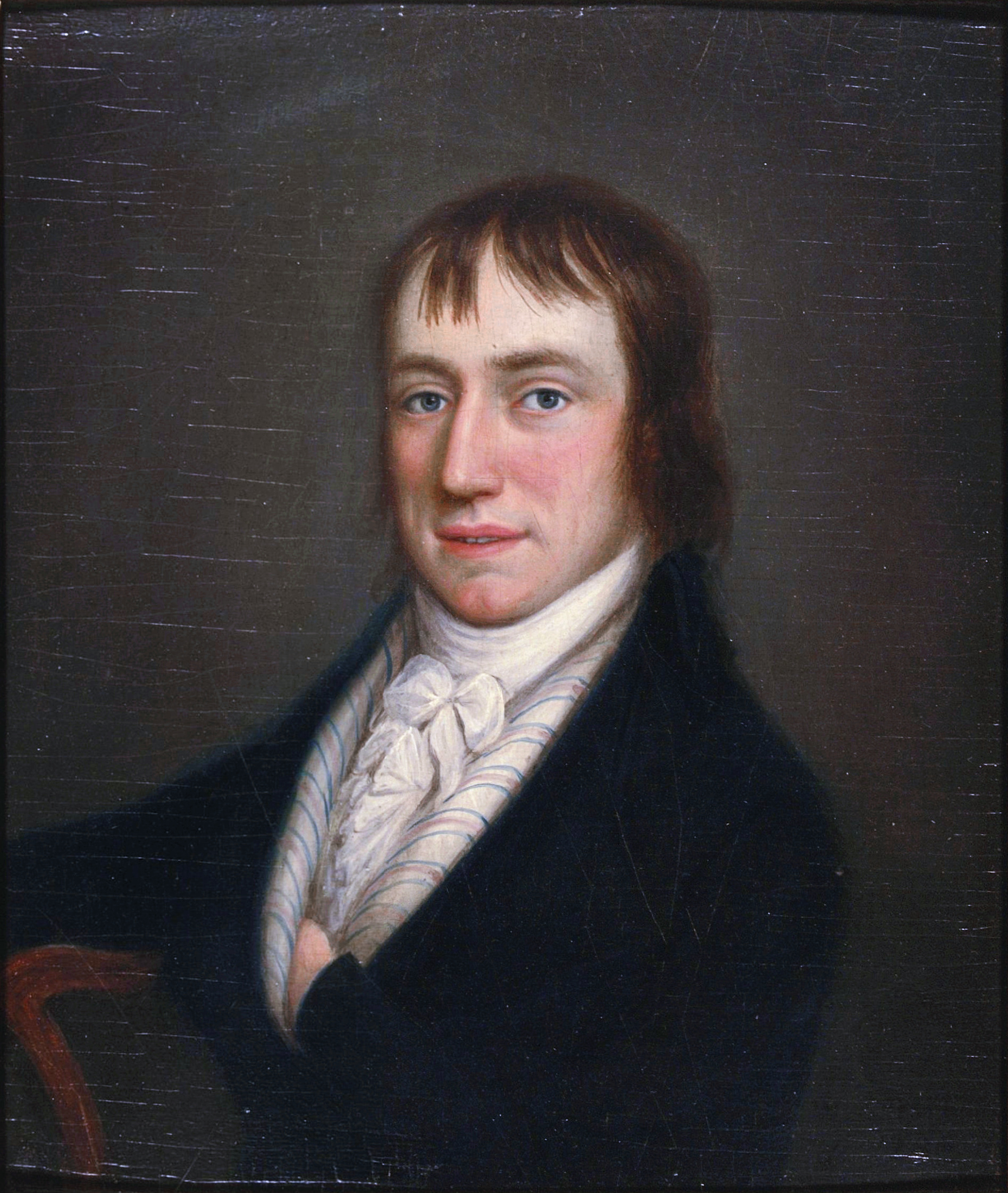
William Wordsworth, author of "I travelled among unknown men"

Reading of "I travelled among unknown men"

"I travelled among unknown men" is a love poem completed in April 1801 by the English poet William Wordsworth and originally intended for the Lyrical Ballads anthology, but it was first published in Poems, in Two Volumes in 1807 (see 1807 in poetry). The third poem of Wordsworth's "Lucy series", "I travelled..." was composed after the poet had spent time living in Germany in 1798. Due to acute homesickness, the lyrics promise that once returned to England, he will never live abroad again. The poet states he now loves England "more and more". Wordsworth realizes that he did not know how much he loved England until he lived abroad and uses this insight as an analogy to understand his unrequited feelings for his beloved, Lucy.

Although "I travelled..." was written two years after the other four poems in the series, in both tone and language it closely echoes the earlier work. Wordsworth gives no hint as to the identity of Lucy, and although he stated in the introduction that all the poems were 'founded on fact', knowing the basis for the character of Lucy is not necessary to appreciate the poem and its sentiment. Earlier critics assumed she represents a youthful love of Wordsworth who had died, but modern scholarship believes she was likely a hybrid or largely fictitious. Similarly, no insight can be gained from determining the exact geographical location of the 'springs of Dove'; in his youth, Wordsworth had visited springs of that name in Derbyshire, Patterdale and Yorkshire.

The poem is filled with conflict and contradictions. Comparing the irony of the usage of the words "among" and "unknown" in the poem's title, the critic Mark Jones concluded that 'unknown' indicated the poet finally realizes the depth of his feelings for Lucy. Jones wrote, "these are paradoxes of memory and belated appreciation, and they turn on the question of what it is to know, as the two uses of this word in the first stanza indicate". The language used is highly nostalgic for a personal and societal ideal, according to critic Dudley Fitts it "expresses with quiet assurance the value of a life lived within the protective circle of a national and social tradition".

Lucy's only appearance is in the second half of the poem, where she is linked with the English landscape. As such, it seems as if nature joins with the narrator in mourning over Lucy, and the reader is drawn within this mutual sorrow. Although the poem focuses on death, it transitions into a poem describing the narrator's love for England and nature.

'Tis past, that melancholy dream!
Nor will I quit thy shore
A second time; for still I seem
To love thee more and more. (lines 5–8)

== Bibliography ==
- Johnston, Kenneth. The Hidden Wordsworth: Poet, Lover, Rebel, Spy. W. W. Norton & Company, 1998. ISBN 0-393-04623-0
- Jones, Mark. The 'Lucy Poems': A Case Study in Literary Knowledge. Toronto: The University of Toronto Press, 1995. ISBN 0-8020-0434-2
- Moorman, Mary. William Wordsworth: A Biography: The Early Years, 1770-1803. Oxford: Clarendon Press, 1957.
