= Strange fits of passion have I known =

Poem by William Wordsworth

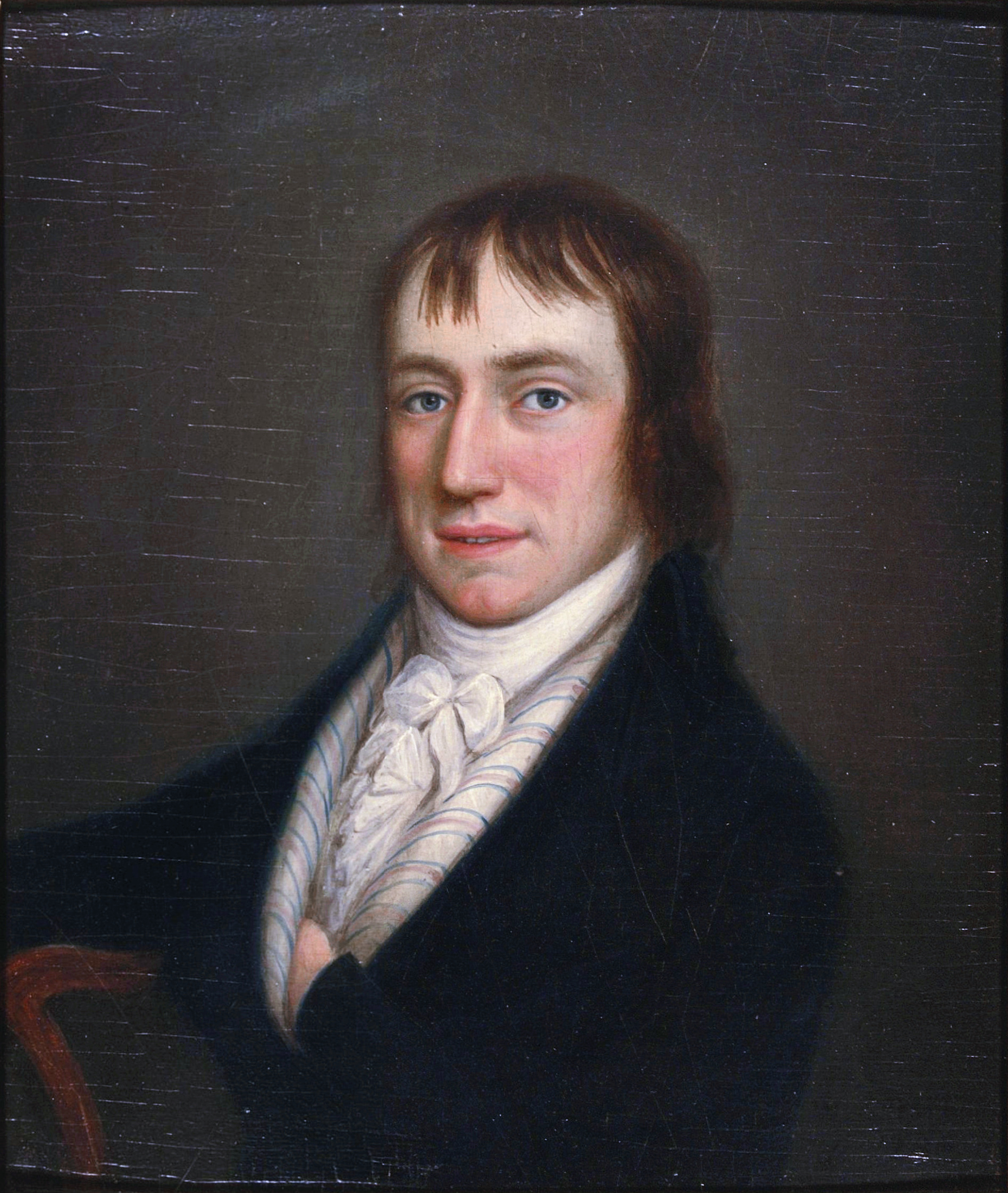
William Wordsworth, author of "Strange fits of passion have I known".

Reading of "Strange fits of passion have I known"

"Strange fits of passion have I known" is a seven-stanza poem ballad by the English Romantic poet William Wordsworth. Composed during a sojourn in Germany in 1798, the poem was first published in the second edition of Lyrical Ballads (1800). The poem describes the poet's trip to his beloved Lucy's cottage, and his thoughts on the way. Each of its seven stanzas is four lines long and has a rhyming scheme of ABAB. The poem is written in iambic tetrameter and iambic trimeter.

In the poem, the speaker narrates a night time ride to the cottage of his beloved Lucy, who always looks as "fresh as a rose in June". The speaker begins by saying that he has experienced "strange fits of passion" and will recount them only to another lover ("in the Lover's ear alone, / What once to me befell."). In the five following stanzas, he recounts how he wended his way on horseback "beneath an evening-moon". He crossed a lea, passed through an orchard, and began to climb a hill, atop which was Lucy's cottage. As he "came near, and nearer still" to "Lucy's cot", the sinking moon appeared to follow suit. As he closely approaches the cottage, the moon vanishes from sight behind the roof. A morbid thought rises unbidden to the speaker's mind: "O mercy!" he thinks. "If Lucy should be dead!"

"Strange fits of passion have I known" is simple in form but complex in content. The dramatic first stanza (the speaker "will dare to tell" of his "strange fits of passion," but "in the Lover's ear alone") quickly captivates the reader. Wordsworth then creates tension by juxtaposing the sinking moon and the approaching rider, the familiar landscape with the speaker's strange, dreamy feelings.

It is uncertain whether the Lucy of the poem was based on a historical person or was a creation of Wordsworth's fertile imagination. If she is real, her surname and identity are unknown, though they have been the subject of much "diligent speculation" in literary circles. "The one certainty is that she is not the girl of Wordsworth's Lucy Gray."

An earlier version of this poem ended with an extra verse:

I told her this: her laughter light
Is ringing in my ears:
And when I think upon that night
My eyes are dim with tears.

== Bibliography ==
- Jones, Mark. "The 'Lucy Poems': A Case Study in Literary Knowledge". The University of Toronto Press, 1995.
- Murray, Roger N. Wordsworth's Style: Figures and Themes in the Lyrical Ballads of 1800. Lincoln: University of Nebraska Press, 1967.
- Rolfe, William J. William Wordsworth, Select Poems of William Wordsworth (New York: American Book), 1889.
- Woodring, Carl. "Wordsworth". Boston: Houghton Mifflin, 1965.
