= William Wordsworth =

English Romantic poet (1770–1850)

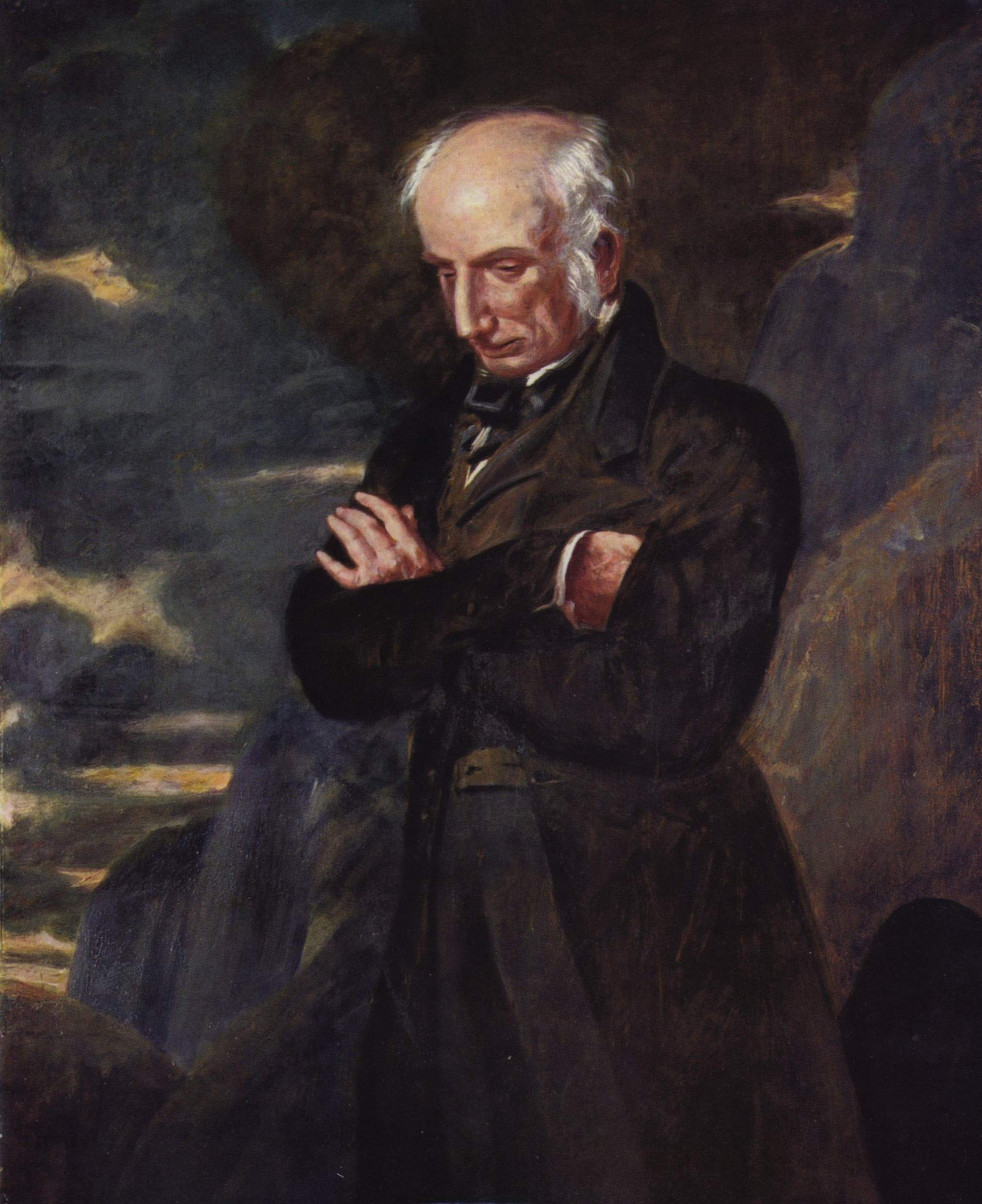
- Portrait by Benjamin Robert Haydon, 1842

Poet Laureate of the United Kingdom
- In office 6 April 1843 – 23 April 1850
- Monarch: Victoria
- Preceded by: Robert Southey
- Succeeded by: Alfred, Lord Tennyson

Personal details
- Born: 7 April 1770 Cockermouth, Cumberland, England
- Died: 23 April 1850 (aged 80) Rydal, Westmorland, England
- Spouse: Mary Hutchinson (m. 1802)
- Children: 6, including Dora
- Relatives: Dorothy Wordsworth (sister); John Wordsworth (brother); Christopher Wordsworth (brother); Richard Wordsworth (great-great-grandson)
- Education: St John's College, Cambridge
- Occupation: Poet
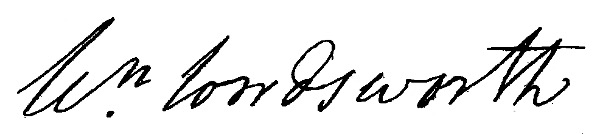
- Signature

William Wordsworth (7 April 1770 – 23 April 1850) was an English Romantic poet who, with Samuel Taylor Coleridge, helped to launch the Romantic Age in English literature with their joint publication Lyrical Ballads (1798).

Wordsworth's magnum opus is generally considered to be The Prelude, a semi-autobiographical poem of his early years that he revised and expanded a number of times. It was posthumously titled and published by his wife in the year of his death, before which it was generally known as "The Poem to Coleridge".

Wordsworth was Poet Laureate from 1843 until his death from pleurisy in 1850. He remains one of the most recognisable names in English poetry and was a key figure among the Romantic poets.

== Early life ==
=== Family and education ===
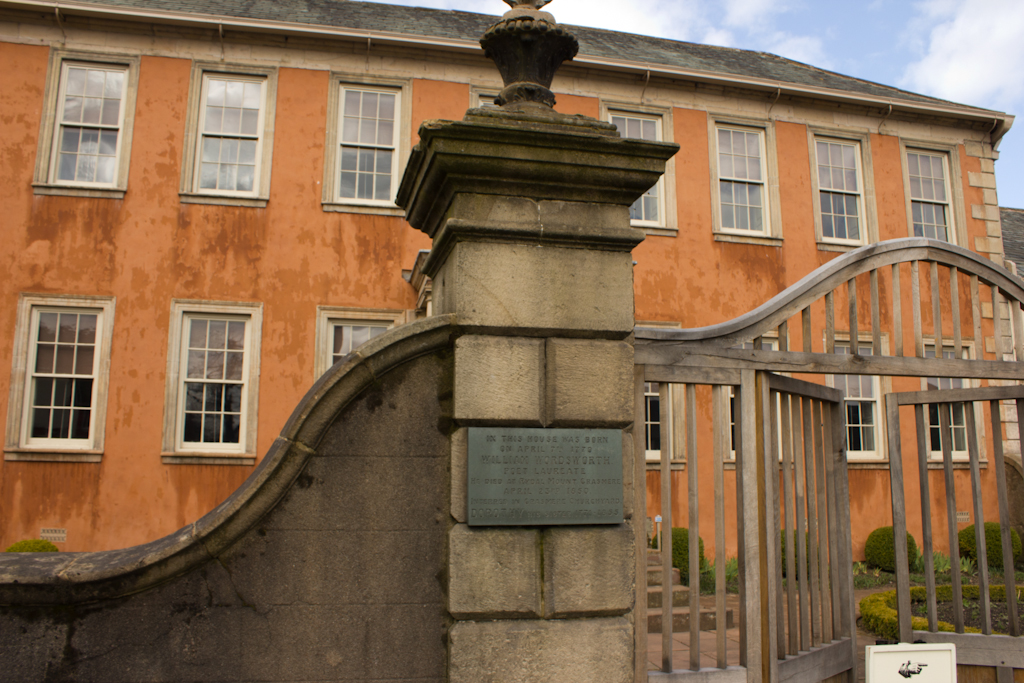
Wordsworth's birthplace in Cockermouth, Cumbria

William Wordsworth was born on 7 April 1770, the second of five children born to John Wordsworth and Ann Cookson in what is now named Wordsworth House in Cockermouth, Cumberland (now in Cumbria), part of the scenic region in northwestern England known as the Lake District. William's sister, the poet and diarist Dorothy Wordsworth, to whom he was close all his life, was born the following year, and the two were baptised together. They had three other siblings: Richard, the eldest, who became a lawyer; John Wordsworth, born after Dorothy, who went to sea and died in 1805 when the ship of which he was captain, the Earl of Abergavenny, was wrecked off the south coast of England; and Christopher, the youngest, who entered the Church and rose to be Master of Trinity College, Cambridge.

Wordsworth's father was a legal representative of James Lowther, 1st Earl of Lonsdale, and, through his connections, lived in a large mansion in the small town. He was frequently away from home on business, so the young William and his siblings had little involvement with him and remained distant until he died in 1783. However, he did encourage William in his reading, and in particular, set him to commit large portions of verse to memory, including works by John Milton, William Shakespeare and Edmund Spenser, which William would pore over in his father's library. William also spent time at his mother's parents' house in Penrith, Cumberland, where he was exposed to the moors but did not get along with his grandparents or uncle, who also lived there. His hostile interactions with them distressed him to the point of contemplating suicide.

Wordsworth was taught to read by his mother, and he first attended a tiny school of low quality in Cockermouth, then a school in Penrith for the children of upper-class families. He was taught there by Ann Birkett, who instilled in her students traditions that included pursuing scholarly and local activities, especially the festivals around Easter, May Day and Shrove Tuesday. Wordsworth was taught both the Bible and The Spectator, but little else. At the school in Penrith, he met the Hutchinsons, including Mary Hutchinson, who later became his wife.

After the death of Wordsworth's mother, in 1778, his father sent him to Hawkshead Grammar School in Lancashire (now in Cumbria) and sent Dorothy to live with relatives in Yorkshire. She and William did not meet again for nine years.

Wordsworth debuted as a writer in 1787 when he published a sonnet in The European Magazine. That same year he began attending St John's College, Cambridge. He received his BA degree in 1791. He returned to Hawkshead for the first two summers of his time at Cambridge and often spent later holidays on walking tours, visiting places famous for the beauty of their landscape. In 1790, he went on a walking tour of Europe, during which he toured the Alps extensively and visited nearby areas of France, Switzerland, and Italy.

=== Relationship with Annette Vallon ===
In November 1791, Wordsworth visited Revolutionary France and became enchanted with the Republican movement. He fell in love with a French woman, Annette Vallon, the daughter of a French Royalist, who in 1792 gave birth to their daughter Caroline. Financial problems and Britain's tense relations with France forced him to return to England alone the following year. The circumstances of his return and subsequent behaviour raised doubts about his declared wish to marry Annette. However, he supported her and his daughter as best he could in later life. The Reign of Terror left Wordsworth thoroughly disillusioned with the French Revolution, and in December 1792 or January 1793 his family discontinued the allowance he had been living on and recalled him to England.

With the Peace of Amiens again allowing travel to France, in 1802, Wordsworth and his sister Dorothy visited Annette and Caroline in Calais. The purpose of the visit was to prepare Annette for the fact of his forthcoming marriage to Mary Hutchinson. Afterwards, he wrote the sonnet "It is a beauteous evening, calm and free", recalling a seaside walk with the nine-year-old Caroline, whom he had never seen before that visit. Mary was anxious that Wordsworth should do more for Caroline. Upon Caroline's marriage, in 1816, Wordsworth settled £30 a year on her (equivalent to £2,000 in 2021), payments which continued until 1835, when they were replaced by a capital settlement.

== Early career ==
=== First publication and Lyrical Ballads ===
We Are Seven

I met a little cottage girl:
She was eight years old, she said;
Her hair was thick with many a curl
That clustered round her head.

She had a rustic, woodland air,
And she was wildly clad;
Her eyes were fair, and very fair; -
Her beauty made me glad.

"Sisters and brothers, little maid,
How many may you be?"
"How many? Seven in all," she said,
And wondering looked at me.

"And where are they? I pray you tell."
She answered, "Seven are we;
And two of us at Conway dwell,
And two are gone to sea;

"Two of us in the churchyard lie,
My sister and my brother;
And, in the churchyard cottage, I
Dwell near them with my mother."

"My stockings there I often knit;
My kerchief there I hem;
And there upon the ground I sit,
And sing a song to them.

"And often after sunset, sir,
When it is light and fair,
I take my little porringer,
And eat my supper there.

"How many are you, then," said I,
"If they two are in heaven?"
Quick was the little maid's reply:
"O Master! we are seven."

"But they are dead; those two are dead!
Their spirits are in heaven!" -
'T was throwing words away; for still
The little maid would have her will,
And said, "Nay, we are seven!"

— From the "We Are Seven" poem

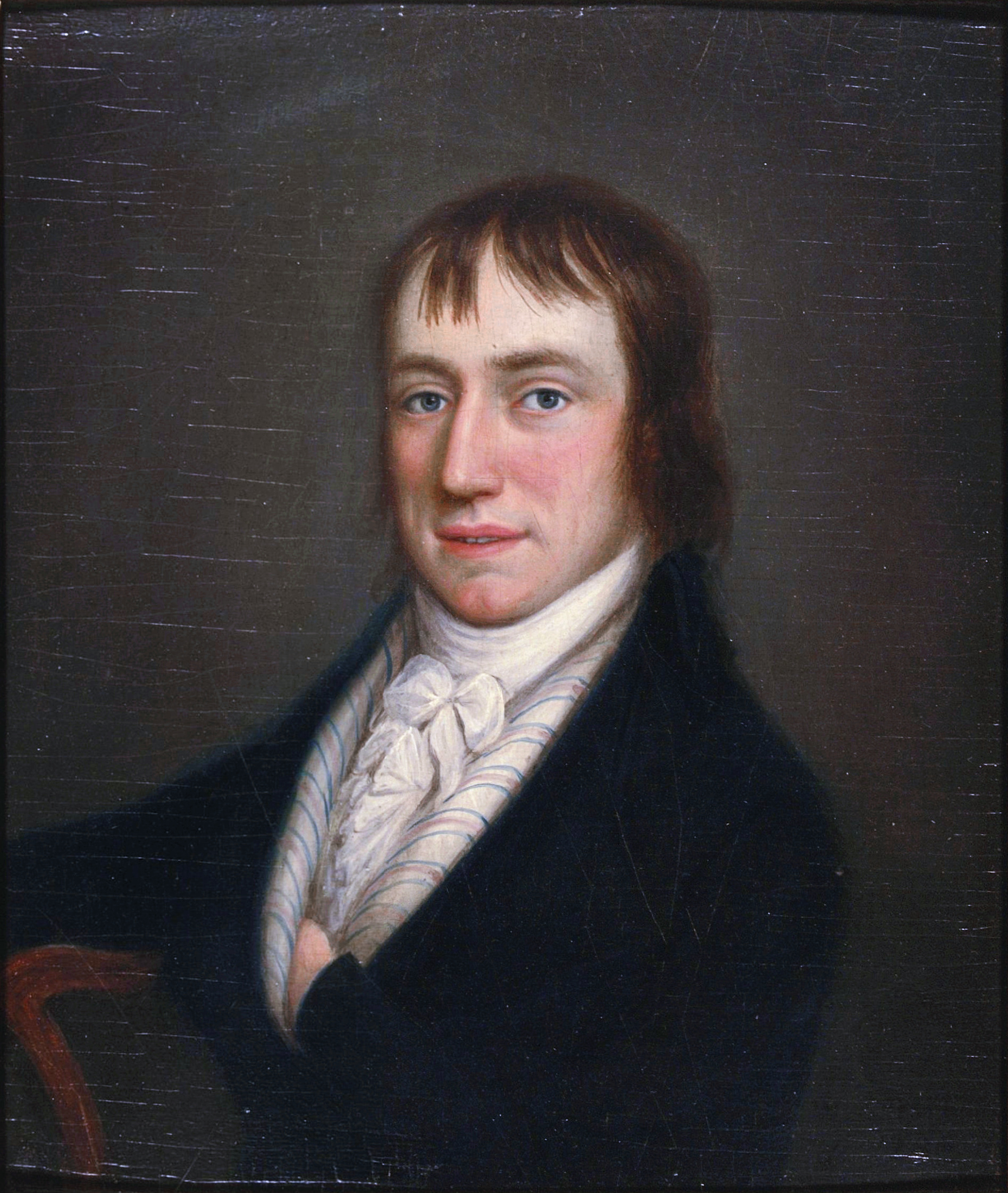
Wordsworth in 1798, about the time he began The Prelude.

The year 1793 saw the first publication of poems by Wordsworth in the volumes An Evening Walk and Descriptive Sketches. In 1795, he received a legacy of £900 from Raisley Calvert and was able to pursue a career as a poet.

It was also in 1795 that he met Samuel Taylor Coleridge in Somerset. The two poets quickly developed a close friendship. For two years from 1795, William and his sister Dorothy lived at Racedown House in Dorset—a property of the Pinney family—to the west of Pilsdon Pen. They walked in the area for about two hours daily, and the nearby hills consoled Dorothy as she pined for the fells of her native Lakeland. She wrote,

"We have hills which, seen from a distance, almost take the character of mountains, some cultivated nearly to their summits, others in their wild state covered with furze and broom. These delight me the most as they remind me of our native wilds."

In 1797 the pair moved to Alfoxton House, Somerset, just a few miles away from Coleridge's home in Nether Stowey. Together Wordsworth and Coleridge (with insights from Dorothy) produced Lyrical Ballads (1798), an important work in the English Romantic movement. The volume gave neither Wordsworth's nor Coleridge's name as author. One of Wordsworth's most famous poems, "Tintern Abbey", was published in this collection, along with Coleridge's "The Rime of the Ancient Mariner". The second edition, published in 1800, had only Wordsworth listed as the author and included a preface to the poems. It was augmented significantly in the next edition, published in 1802. In this preface, which some scholars consider a central work of Romantic literary theory, Wordsworth discusses what he sees as the elements of a new type of verse, one that is based on the ordinary language "really used by men" while avoiding the poetic diction of much 18th-century verse. Wordsworth also gives his famous definition of poetry as "the spontaneous overflow of powerful feelings: it takes its origin from emotion recollected in tranquility", and calls his own poems in the book "experimental". A fourth and final edition of Lyrical Ballads was published in 1805.

=== The Borderers ===
Between 1795 and 1797, Wordsworth wrote his only play, The Borderers, a verse tragedy set during the reign of King Henry III of England, when Englishmen in the North Country came into conflict with Scottish border reivers. He attempted to get the play staged in November 1797. However, it was rejected by Thomas Harris, the manager of the Covent Garden Theatre, who proclaimed it "impossible that the play should succeed in the representation". The rebuff was not received lightly by Wordsworth, and the play was not published until 1842, after substantial revisions.

== Germany and move to the Lake District ==
I travelled among unknown men

I travelled among unknown men,
In lands beyond the sea;
Nor, England! did I know till then
What love I bore to thee.

'T is past, that melancholy dream!
Nor will I quit thy shore
A second time, for still I seem
To love thee more and more.

Among thy mountains did I feel
The joy of my desire;
And she I cherished turned her wheel
Beside an English fire.

Thy mornings showed, thy nights concealed,
The bowers where Lucy played;
And thine too is the last green field
That Lucy's eyes surveyed.

—

Wordsworth, Dorothy, and Coleridge travelled to Germany in the autumn of 1798. While Coleridge was intellectually stimulated by the journey, its main effect on Wordsworth was to produce homesickness. During the harsh winter of 1798–99, Wordsworth lived with Dorothy in Goslar, and, despite extreme stress and loneliness, began work on the autobiographical piece that was later titled The Prelude. He wrote several other famous poems in Goslar, including "The Lucy poems". In the Autumn of 1799, Wordsworth and his sister returned to England and visited the Hutchinson family at Sockburn. When Coleridge arrived back in England, he travelled to the North with their publisher, Joseph Cottle, to meet Wordsworth and undertake a proposed tour of the Lake District. This was the immediate cause of the brother and sister's settling at Dove Cottage in Grasmere in the Lake District, this time with another poet, Robert Southey, nearby. Wordsworth, Coleridge and Southey came to be known as the "Lake Poets". Throughout this period, many of Wordsworth's poems revolved around themes of death, endurance, separation and grief.

== Married life ==
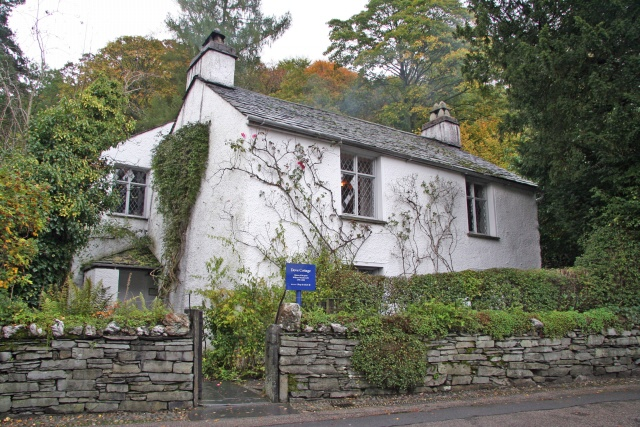
Dove Cottage (Town End, Grasmere) – home of William and Dorothy Wordsworth, 1799–1808; home of Thomas De Quincey, 1809–1820

In 1802, Lowther's heir, William Lowther, 1st Earl of Lonsdale, paid the £4,000 (equivalent to £337,132 in 2025) owed to Wordsworth's father through Lowther's failure to pay his aide. It was this repayment that afforded Wordsworth the financial means to marry. On 4 October, following his visit with Dorothy to France to arrange matters with Annette, Wordsworth married his childhood friend, Mary Hutchinson, at All Saints' Church, Brompton. Dorothy continued to live with the couple and grew close to Mary. The following year, Mary gave birth to the first of five children, three of whom predeceased her and William:

- Rev. John Wordsworth MA (18 June 1803 – 25 July 1875). Vicar of Brigham, Cumberland and Rector of Plumbland, Cumberland. Buried at Highgate Cemetery (west side). Married four times:
  1. Isabella Curwen (died 1848) had six children: Jane Stanley, Henry, William, John, Charles and Edward.
    1. Jane Stanley (1833–1912), who married the Rev. Bennet Sherard Kennedy (an illegitimate son of Robert Sherard, 6th Earl of Harborough) and their son Robert Harborough Sherard became first biographer to his friend, Oscar Wilde.
  2. Helen Ross (died 1854). No children.
  3. Mary Ann Dolan (died after 1858) had one daughter Dora.
    1. Dora Wordsworth (1858–1934)
  4. Mary Gamble. No children.
- Dora Wordsworth (16 August 1804 – 9 July 1847). Married Edward Quillinan in 1841.
- Thomas Wordsworth (15 June 1806 – 1 December 1812).
- Catherine Wordsworth (6 September 1808 – 4 June 1812).
- William "Willy" Wordsworth (12 May 1810 – 1883). He married Fanny Graham and had four children: Mary Louisa, William, Reginald, and Gordon.

== Later career ==
=== Autobiographical work and Poems, in Two Volumes ===
Wordsworth had for years been making plans to write a long philosophical poem in three parts, which he intended to call The Recluse. In 1798–99 he started an autobiographical poem, which he referred to as the "poem to Coleridge" and which he planned would serve as an appendix to a larger work called The Recluse. In 1804, he began expanding this autobiographical work, having decided to make it a prologue rather than an appendix. He completed this work, now generally referred to as the first version of The Prelude, in 1805, but refused to publish such a personal work until he had completed the whole of The Recluse. The death of his brother John, also in 1805, affected him strongly and may have influenced his decisions about these works.

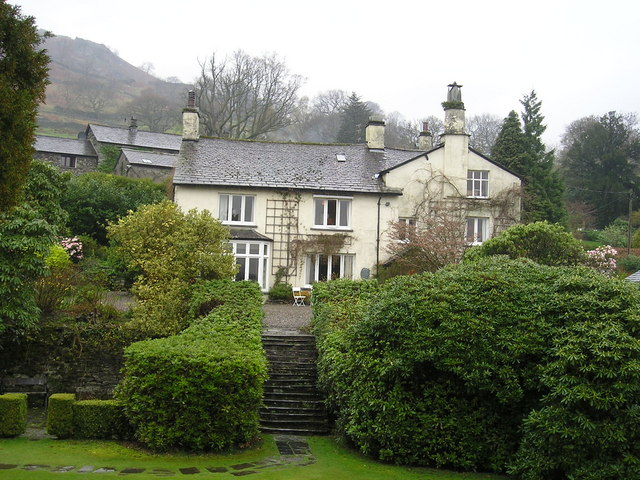
Rydal Mount, Wordsworth's home from 1813 to 1850. Hundreds of visitors came here to see him over the years.

Wordsworth's philosophical allegiances, as articulated in The Prelude and in such shorter works as "Lines written a few miles above Tintern Abbey" have been a source of critical debate. It was long supposed that Wordsworth relied chiefly on Coleridge for philosophical guidance. However, scholars have recently suggested that Wordsworth's ideas may have been formed years before he and Coleridge became friends in the mid-1790s. In particular, while he was in revolutionary Paris in 1792, the 22-year-old Wordsworth met the mysterious traveller John "Walking" Stewart (1747–1822), who was nearing the end of his thirty years of wandering, on foot, from Madras, India, through Persia and Arabia, across Africa and Europe, and up through the fledgling United States. By the time of their association, Stewart had published an ambitious work of original materialist philosophy entitled The Apocalypse of Nature (London, 1791), to which many of Wordsworth's philosophical sentiments may well be indebted.

In 1807 Wordsworth published Poems, in Two Volumes, including "Ode: Intimations of Immortality from Recollections of Early Childhood". Until now, Wordsworth was known only for Lyrical Ballads, and he hoped this new collection would cement his reputation. Its reception was lukewarm.

In 1810 Wordsworth and Coleridge were estranged over the latter's opium addiction, and in 1812 his son Thomas died at the age of 6, six months after the death of 3-year-old Catherine. The following year, he received an appointment as Distributor of Stamps for Westmorland, and the stipend of £400 a year made him financially secure, albeit at the cost of political independence. In 1813, he and his family, including Dorothy, moved to Rydal Mount, Ambleside (between Grasmere and Rydal Water), where he spent the rest of his life.

=== The Prospectus ===
In 1814, Wordsworth published The Excursion as the second part of the three-part work The Recluse even though he never completed the first or third parts. He did, however, write a poetic Prospectus to The Recluse in which he laid out the structure and intention of the whole work. The Prospectus contains some of Wordsworth's most famous lines on the relation between the human mind and nature:

... my voice proclaims
How exquisitely the individual Mind
(And the progressive powers perhaps no less
Of the whole species) to the external World
Is fitted:—and how exquisitely, too—
Theme this but little heard of among Men,
The external World is fitted to the Mind;
And the creation (by no lower name
Can it be called) which they with blended might
Accomplish ...

Some modern critics suggest that there was a decline in his work beginning around the mid-1810s, perhaps because most of the concerns that characterised his early poems (loss, death, endurance, separation and abandonment) had been resolved in his writings and his life. By 1820, he was enjoying considerable success accompanying a reversal in the contemporary critical opinion of his earlier works.

The poet and artist William Blake, who knew Wordsworth's work, was struck by Wordsworth's boldness in centring his poetry on the human mind. In response to Wordsworth's poetic programme that, "when we look / Into our Minds, into the Mind of Man– / My haunt, and the main region of my song" (The Excursion), William Blake wrote to his friend Henry Crabb Robinson that the passage "caused him a bowel complaint which nearly killed him".

Following the death of his friend the painter William Green in 1823, Wordsworth also mended his relations with Coleridge. The two were fully reconciled by 1828 when they toured the Rhineland together. Dorothy suffered from a severe illness in 1829 and she remained ill for the remainder of her life. Coleridge and Charles Lamb both died in 1834, their loss being a difficult blow to Wordsworth. The following year saw the death of James Hogg. Despite the death of many contemporaries, the popularity of his poetry ensured a steady stream of young friends and admirers to replace those he lost.

== Religious and philosophical beliefs ==
Wordsworth's youthful political radicalism, unlike Coleridge's, never led him to rebel against his religious upbringing. He remarked in 1812 that he was willing to shed his blood for the established Church of England, reflected in his Ecclesiastical Sketches of 1822. This religious conservatism also colours The Excursion (1814), a long poem that became extremely popular during the nineteenth century. It features three central characters: the Wanderer, who "loved to pace the public roads", the Solitary, who has experienced the hopes and miseries of the French Revolution, and the Pastor, who dominates the last third of the poem.

=== Wordsworth's poetic philosophy ===
Behler has pointed out the fact that Wordsworth wanted to invoke the basic feeling that a human heart possesses and expresses. He had reversed the philosophical standpoint expressed by Coleridge, of 'creating the characters in such an environment so that the public feels them belonging to the distant place and time'. And this philosophical realisation by Wordsworth indeed allowed him to choose the language and structural patterning of the poetry that a common person used every day. Kurland wrote that the conversational aspect of a language emerges through social necessity. Social necessity posits the theme of possessing the proper knowledge, interest and biases also among the speakers. William Wordsworth has used conversation in his poetry to let the poet 'I' merge into 'We'. The poem "Farewell" exposes the identical emotion that the poet and his sister nourish:

"We leave you here in solitude to dwell. With these our latest gifts of tender thought

Thou, like the morning, in thy saffron coat, Bright gowan, and marsh-marigold, farewell!" (L. 19–22).

This kind of conversational tone persists throughout the poet's career, which positions him as a man in society who speaks to the purpose of communion with the very common mass of that society. Again; "Preface to Lyrical Ballads" is the evidence where the poet expresses why he is writing and what he is writing and what purpose it will serve humanity.

== Laureateship and other honours ==
Wordsworth remained a formidable presence in his later years. In 1837, the Scottish poet and playwright Joanna Baillie reflected on her long acquaintance with Wordsworth. "He looks like a man that one must not speak to unless one has some sensible thing to say. However, he does occasionally converse cheerfully & well, and when one knows how benevolent & excellent he is, it disposes one to be very much pleased with him."

In 1838, Wordsworth received an honorary doctorate in Civil Law from the University of Durham. The following year he was awarded the same honorary degree by the University of Oxford, when John Keble praised him as the "poet of humanity", praise greatly appreciated by Wordsworth. (It has been argued that Wordsworth was a significant influence on Keble's immensely popular book of devotional poetry, The Christian Year (1827).) In 1842, the government awarded him a Civil List pension of £300 a year.

Following the death of Robert Southey in 1843, Wordsworth became Poet Laureate. He initially refused the honour, saying that he was too old, but accepted when the prime minister, Robert Peel, assured him that "you shall have nothing required of you". Wordsworth thus became the only poet laureate to write no official verses. The sudden death of his daughter Dora in 1847 at age 42 was difficult for the ageing poet to take, and in his depression, he ultimately gave up writing new material.

== Arms ==
Coat of arms of William Wordsworth
Notes The crescent denotes that Wordsworth is a second son. Crest An antelope's head erased Argent. Escutcheon Argent, three church bells Azure. A crescent for difference.

== Death ==
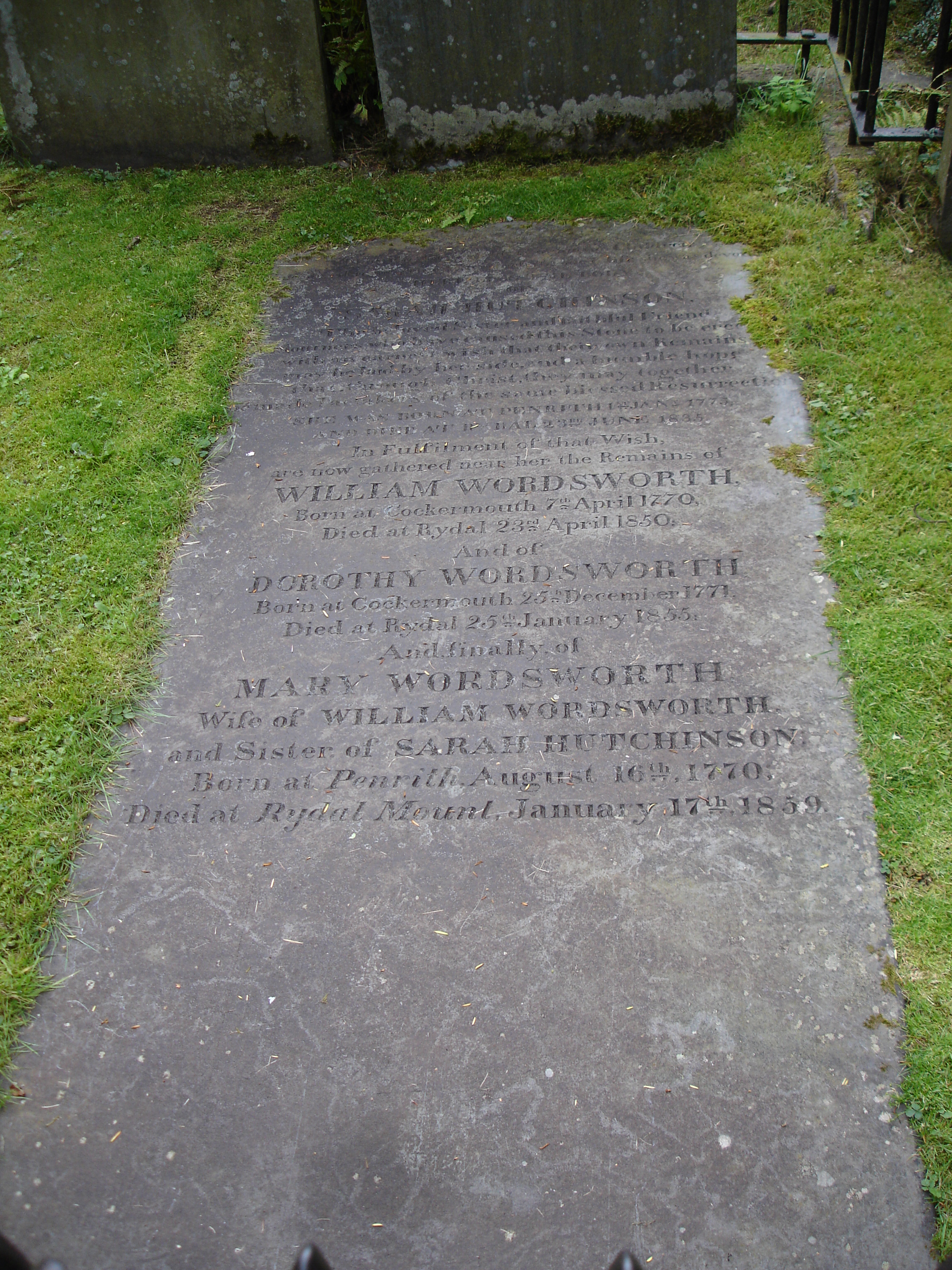
Gravestone of William Wordsworth in Grasmere, Cumbria

Wordsworth died at home at Rydal Mount from an aggravated case of pleurisy on 23 April 1850, and was buried at St Oswald's Church, Grasmere. His widow, Mary, published his lengthy autobiographical "Poem to Coleridge" as The Prelude several months after his death. Though it failed to interest people at the time, it has since come to be widely recognised as his masterpiece.

== Musical settings ==
- Dominick Argento set eight Wordsworth poems in his song cycle To be Sung Upon the Water (1973).
- Arnold Bax set the poem "To the Cuckoo" in 1900 while a student.
- Richard Rodney Bennett set Intimations of Immortality for a cappella chorus and one instrument in 2000.
- Benjamin Britten set a passage from The Prelude (beginning "But that night, When on my bed I lay") in his song cycle Nocturne (1958).
- Alicia Van Buren (1860–1922) used the text of "Lines Written in Early Spring" for her song "In Early Spring".
- Ronald Corp has set passages from The Prelude within his cantata Laudamus (1994) and various poems in his song cycles The Music of Wordsworth and Flower of Cities.
- George Dyson's Quo Vadis for chorus and orchestra, written between 1936 and 1945, includes a setting of "Our birth is but a sleep" (from Intimations of Immortality).
- Gerald Finzi set the ode Intimations of Immortality for tenor, chorus, and orchestra in 1950.
- Charles Ives set "I travelled among unknown men" in 1901. His work The Rainbow (1914) for chamber orchestra is described as "after the poem by William Wordsworth". He also set the text as a song.
- Frederick Kelly set "The daffodils" in 1913.
- Elisabeth Lutyens set "I travelled among unknown men" in her Voice of Quiet Waters, op. 84 for mixec choir and ensemble (1973).
- Audrey Piggott used Wordsworth’s text in her song “On Westminster Bridge.”
- Marion Morrey Richter used Wordsworth's text for her song "Daffodils".
- Arthur Somervell set eight sections from "On the Power of Sound" as a cantata for chorus and orchestra in 1894. His Meditation on Wordsworth's Intimations of Immortality for baritone solo and chorus, was first premiered in 1907 but re-written in 1934.
- William Walton set "Remembrance of Collins" in his song cycle A Song for the Lord Mayor's Table in 1962.

== In popular culture ==
Ken Russell's 1978 film William and Dorothy portrays the relationship between William and his sister Dorothy.

Wordsworth and Coleridge's friendship is examined by Julien Temple in his 2000 film Pandaemonium.

Wordsworth has appeared as a character in works of fiction, including:

- Margaret Louisa Woods – A Poet's Youth. 1923
- William Kinsolving – Mister Christian. 1996
- Jasper Fforde – The Eyre Affair. 2001
- Val McDermid – The Grave Tattoo. 2006
- Sue Limb – The Wordsmiths at Gorsemere. 2008

Isaac Asimov's 1966 novelisation of the 1966 film Fantastic Voyage sees Dr Peter Duval quoting Wordsworth's The Prelude as the miniaturised submarine sails through the cerebral fluid surrounding a human brain, comparing it to the "strange seas of thought".

Taylor Swift's 2020 album Folklore alludes to Wordsworth in her bonus track "The Lakes", which is thought to be about the Lake District.

== Commemoration ==
In April 2020 Royal Mail issued a series of postage stamps to mark the 250th anniversary of the birth of Wordsworth. Ten 1st-class stamps were issued featuring Wordsworth and all the major British poets of the Romantic era: William Blake, John Keats, Lord Byron, John Clare, Samuel Taylor Coleridge, Mary Robinson, Letitia Elizabeth Landon, Percy Bysshe Shelley and Walter Scott. Each stamp included an extract from one of their most popular and enduring works, with Wordsworth's "The Rainbow" selected for the poet.

== Major works ==
- Lyrical Ballads, with a Few Other Poems (1798)
  - "Simon Lee"
  - "We are Seven"
  - "Lines Written in Early Spring"
  - "Expostulation and Reply"
  - "The Tables Turned"
  - "The Thorn"
  - "Lines Composed A Few Miles above Tintern Abbey"
- Lyrical Ballads, with Other Poems (1800)
  - Preface to the Lyrical Ballads
  - "Strange fits of passion have I known"
  - "She Dwelt among the Untrodden Ways"
  - "Three years she grew"
  - "A Slumber Did my Spirit Seal"
  - "I travelled among unknown men"
  - "Lucy Gray"
  - "The Two April Mornings"
  - "Nutting"
  - "The Ruined Cottage"
  - "Michael"
  - "The Kitten at Play"
- Poems, in Two Volumes (1807)
  - "Resolution and Independence"
  - "I Wandered Lonely as a Cloud" Also known as "Daffodils"
  - "My Heart Leaps Up"
  - "Ode: Intimations of Immortality"
  - "Ode to Duty"
  - "The Solitary Reaper"
  - "Elegiac Stanzas"
  - "Composed upon Westminster Bridge, September 3, 1802"
  - "London, 1802"
  - "The World Is Too Much with Us"
- "French Revolution" (1810)
- Guide to the Lakes (1810)
- "To the Cuckoo"
- The Excursion (1814)
- Laodamia (1815, 1845)
- The White Doe of Rylstone (1815)
- Peter Bell (1819)
- Ecclesiastical Sonnets (1822)
- The Prelude (1850)

Court offices
Preceded by Robert Southey	British Poet Laureate; 1843–1850	Succeeded by Alfred Tennyson
