= Lucy Gray =

1799 poem by William Wordsworth

"Lucy Gray" is a poem written by William Wordsworth in 1799 and published in the second edition of Lyrical Ballads (1800). It describes the death of a young girl named Lucy Gray, who went out one evening into a storm.

== Background ==
The poem was inspired by Wordsworth being surrounded by snow, and his sister's memory of a real incident that happened at Halifax. Wordsworth explained the origins when he wrote, "Written at Goslar in Germany in 1799. It was founded on a circumstance told me by my Sister, of a little girl who, not far from Halifax in Yorkshire, was bewildered in a snow-storm. Her footsteps were traced by her parents to the middle of the lock of a canal, and no other vestige of her, backward or forward, could be traced. The body however was found in the canal." Lucy Gray was first published in Volume 2 of the 1800 edition of Lyrical Ballads.

== Poem ==
Lucy Gray is generally not included with Wordsworth's "Lucy" poems, even though it is a poem that mentions a character named Lucy. The poem is excluded from the series because the traditional "Lucy" poems are uncertain about the age of Lucy and her actual relationship with the narrator, and Lucy Gray provides exact details on both. Furthermore, the poem is different from the "Lucy" poems in that it relies on narrative storytelling and is a direct imitation of the traditional 18th century ballad form.

LUCY GRAY

Oft I had heard of Lucy Gray,
And, when I crossed the Wild,
I chanced to see at break of day
The solitary Child.

No mate, no comrade Lucy knew;
She dwelt on a wide Moor,
-The sweetest Thing that ever grew
Beside a human door!

You yet may spy the Fawn at play,
The Hare upon the Green;
But the sweet face of Lucy Gray
Will never more be seen.

"To-night will be a stormy night,
You to the Town must go,
And take the lantern, Child, to light
Your Mother through the snow".

"That, Father! Will I gladly do;
'Tis scarcely afternoon-
The Minster-clock had just struck two,
And yonder is the moon".

At this the Father raised his hook
And snapp'd a faggot-band;
He plied his work – and Lucy took
The lantern in her hand.

Not blither is the mountain roe;
With many a wanton stroke
Her feet disperse the powdery snow,
That rises up like smoke.

The storm came on before its time,
She wander'd up and down,
And many a hill did Lucy climb
But never reach'd the Town.

The wrecked Parents all that night
Went shouting far and wide;
But there was neither sound nor sight
To serve them for a guide.

At day-break on a hill they stood
That overlooked the Moor;
And thence they saw the Bridge of Wood
A furlong from their door.

They wept, and turning homeward cried
"In Heaven we all shall meet!"
When in the snow the Mother spied
The print of Lucy's feet.

Then downward from the steep hill's edge
They tracked the footmarks small;
And through the broken hawthorn-hedge,
And by the long stone-wall;

And then an open field they crossed,
The marks were still the same;
They tracked them on, nor ever lost,
And to the Bridge they came.

They followed from the snowy bank
The footmarks, one by one,
Into the middle of the plank,
And further there were none.

Yet some maintain that to this day
She is a living Child,
That you may see sweet Lucy Gray
Upon the lonesome Wild.

Over rough and smooth she trips along,
And never looks behind;
And sings a solitary song
That whistles in the wind.

== Themes ==
Bennett Weaver points out that "The dominant theme of the poems of 1799 is death: death for the children of the village school, for Matthew's daughter, and for Lucy Gray", and Mary Moorman believes that Lucy Gray is the "most haunting of all his ballads of childhood". Lucy Gray, like the Lucy of the Lucy poems and Ruth of Wordsworth's "Ruth" are, according to H. W. Garrod, part of "an order of beings who have lapsed out of nature – the nature of woods and hills – into human connections hardly strong enough to hold them. Perpetually they threaten to fall back into a kind of things or a kind of spirits."

Wordsworth is trying to describe how Lucy, a girl connected to nature, dies. She is part of nature, according to Robert Langbaum, because Wordsworth "makes the human figure seem to evolve out of and pass back into the landscape". Henry Crabb Robinson explains that Wordsworth's point "was to exhibit poetically entire solitude, and he represents the child as observing the day-moon, which no town or village girl would ever notice". However, her connection with nature makes it is possible that Lucy's spirit is able to survive. The feeling in Lucy Gray, as John Beer writes, is counter to the feeling in "She dwelt among the untrodden ways" that "No amount of dwelling on her significance as an embodiment of life-forces can reduce by one iota the dull fact of her death and the necessary loss to all who love her."

Wordsworth wrote, in reference to Lucy Gray, "the way in which the incident was treated and the spiritualizing of the character might furnish hints for contrasting the imaginative influences which I have endeavoured to throw over common life with Crabbe's matter of fact style of treating subjects of the same kind". By this, Raymond Havens points out, Wordsworth is trying to pull away from realism into a state dominated by the imagination. To Wordsworth, the imagination was connected to both ethics and aesthetics, and he sought to exalt the imagination in Lucy Gray. Paul De Man believes that there is a "loss of name in the Lucy Gray poems where death makes her into an anonymous entity". However, some critics, like Mark Jones, believe that, in arguing for "a more general symbolic or literary value for Lucy Gray" or deemphasising Lucy Gray's identity as an individual, a critic "obliterates her status as human pure and simple, or, what is the same, underrates the importance of this status."

== Reception ==
William Blake marked the poems Lucy Gray, "Strange fits", and "Louisa" with an "X", which provoked Mark Jones to write "The award for minimalist commentary must go to William Blake". Matthew Arnold believed that Lucy Gray was "a beautiful success" when contrasting how it is able to emphasise an incorporeal side of nature, and he believed that the poem "The Sailor's Mother" was "a failure" for its lack of the incorporeal. However, Swinburne believed that "The Sailor's Mother" was "the deeper in its pathos, the more enduring in its effect, the happier if also the more venturous in its simplicity".

A.C. Bradley believed that "there is too much reason to fear that for half his readers his 'solitary child' is generalised into a mere 'little girl,' and that they never receive the main impression he wished to convey. Yet his intention is announced in the opening lines, and as clearly shown in the lovely final stanzas, which gives even to this ballad the visionary touch".

In 2020 Suzanne Collins released The Ballad of Songbirds and Snakes, a prequel to The Hunger Games. The book focused on President Snow's formation and his mentorship of Lucy Gray Baird, who is named for this poem, as District 12's female tribute in the 10th Hunger Games. The 2023 film adaptation included a musical rendition of the poem on its soundtrack, performed by Rachel Zegler.
