= Thomas Poole (tanner) =

English tanner, philanthropist and essayist (1766-1837)

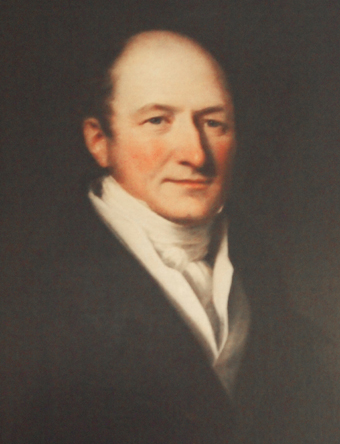
Portrait of Thomas Poole, c. 1815, by Thomas Barber (1771–1843)

Thomas Poole (14 November 1766 – 8 September 1837) was a Somerset tanner, Radical philanthropist, and essayist, who used his wealth to improve the lives of the poor of Nether Stowey, his native village. He was a friend of several writers in the British Romantic movement, a benefactor of Samuel Taylor Coleridge and his family, and an influence on the poems of Wordsworth.

== Youth ==
Poole was born in 1766 in the village of Nether Stowey, Somerset, the son of a successful tanner and farmer. He was, against his own wishes, denied much formal education by his father, who instead apprenticed him to the family tanning business. In spite of his dislike for tanning he became a master of the trade, well thought of by his competitors, and in his spare time studied French, Latin and the humanities and social sciences.

In 1790, he went to London as delegate to a tanners' conference, and in 1791 was chosen by the conference to express their concerns to the Prime Minister, Pitt the Younger.

His London experiences did much to radicalize Poole, and he returned to Somerset a confirmed advocate of the cause of democracy, though he hoped to promote it by peaceful means rather than revolution. In 1793 he started a local reading club which spread the teachings of Thomas Paine, Benjamin Franklin and Mary Wollstonecraft, and the same year he toured the Midlands dressed as a workman to research the living and working conditions of the poor.

Within a few years he had attracted the hostile interest of the Home Office, who thought him a revolutionary agitator and are said to have rated him as the most dangerous person in the county.

Even his relatives were thoroughly exasperated with him: "I wish he would cease to torment us with his democratick sentiments", his cousin Charlotte complained after one argument, while another cousin, with whom he had fallen in love, refused to marry him on political grounds. In the event, he never married.

== The Coleridge circle ==
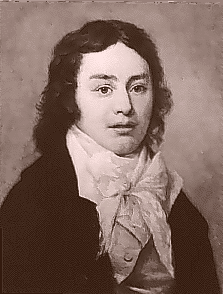
Samuel Taylor Coleridge

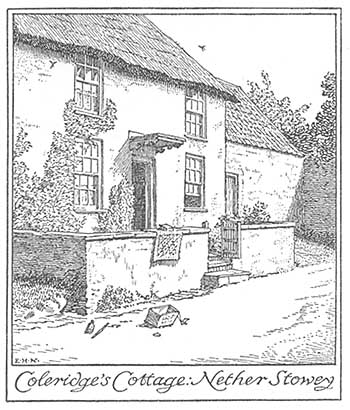
Coleridge Cottage

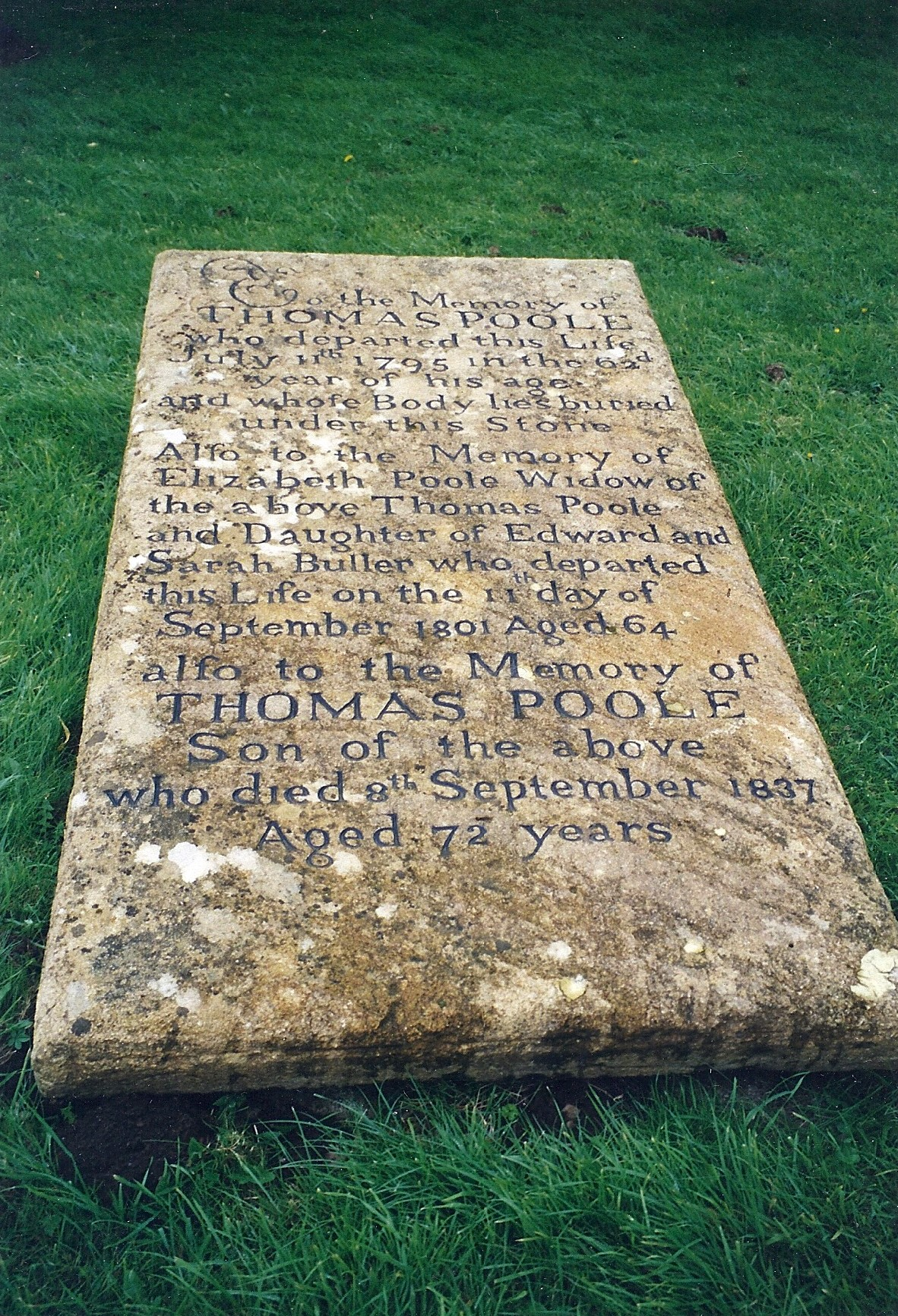
The gravestone of Poole and his parents in the churchyard of St. Mary's, Nether Stowey. His age at death is given inaccurately.

In August 1794 Poole was visited by two young men, Samuel Taylor Coleridge and Robert Southey, whose political views bore some similarity to his own. Both were fired up by doctrines of their own devising which they called Pantisocracy and aspheterism, respectively involving government by the whole of society and common ownership of property by society. They planned to realize these ideals in a commune in Kentucky made up of some two dozen of their friends and relations, though the scene was later shifted first to the Susquehanna River and then to Wales. Poole sympathized with the political idealism of this scheme, though he was too practical a man to have much faith in its chances of succeeding. He was deeply impressed by Coleridge's personality and "splendid abilities", and thought Southey "a mere Boy" by comparison. On another visit by Coleridge in 1795 Poole was inspired to write a poem of his own in tribute to his friend.

In 1796, Poole wrote an article against the slave trade, which Coleridge published in his journal The Watchman, and when that journal failed he organized an annuity to be paid Coleridge by himself and a group of friends. At the end of that year, rather against his better judgement, he found a cottage in Nether Stowey for Coleridge, who now wanted to live a rustic life with his wife Sara and baby son Hartley. A gate was built to connect Coleridge's new garden with Poole's, and Coleridge became a frequent visitor, sometimes studying in Poole's book parlour and sometimes writing, as with his poem "This Lime-Tree Bower My Prison", which was composed in Poole's garden.

Much local suspicion of Poole was roused by his housing such a notorious radical as Coleridge, and this only increased when in 1797 he was persuaded to look for a home for Coleridge's new friends William and Dorothy Wordsworth. Poole helped to secure them Alfoxton House a few miles away, which enabled Coleridge and the Wordsworths to visit each other and interchange ideas on an almost daily basis. Poole had, on first meeting Wordsworth, decided that he was the greatest man he had ever known, and Wordsworth in turn grew to hugely admire his probity, charity and genuineness.

Poole was able to tell Wordsworth stories of Somerset life which later re-emerged in "The Somersetshire Tragedy" (an unpublished fragment), "Poor Susan", "The Idiot Boy", "The Farmer of Tilbury Vale", and probably "The Last of the Flock", while according to Wordsworth himself he had had Poole in mind when writing his poem "Michael".

Poole may have promoted the literary partnership that produced the Lyrical Ballads, but in doing so he also weakened Coleridge's ties to him; realizing this, he found himself for a while in rivalry with Wordsworth for Coleridge's friendship. The two poets departed for Germany together in 1798, leaving Poole to look after Coleridge's wife Sara, and though Coleridge returned the next year he soon went off to join Wordsworth in the Lake District.

Poole's friendship with the two men was thereafter largely conducted through letters and very occasional visits, and though Coleridge was able to be useful to Poole by getting a series of essays by him, called "Monopolists and Farmers", published in the Morning Post, their personal relationship was never again so close. During the Stowey years their association had brought Poole into contact with men in the larger world of literature and ideas, who admired his sterling qualities. These included not only the three Lake Poets but also Charles Lamb, William Hazlitt, John Thelwall, and Humphry Davy. In return he provided Coleridge with much-needed sympathy, practical help and sage advice.

"We were well suited for each other", Coleridge later recalled. "[M]y animal Spirits corrected his inclinations to melancholy; and there was some thing both in his understanding & in his affection so healthy & manly, that my mind freshened in his company, and my ideas & habits of thinking acquired day after day more of substance & reality."

== Later years ==
In 1802, having handed over the management of his business to an assistant, he travelled widely on the Continent, meeting Thomas Paine in Paris. In London he became acquainted with the civil servant John Rickman, and at his suggestion did a good deal of statistical work in London intended to help implement the Poor Laws. He also continued to put his liberal theories into practice in Stowey, establishing the Female Friendly Society in 1807, the elementary school in 1812–13 (he donated the building for it), and the Co-operative Bank in 1817, and from 1814 until his death he was an active justice of the peace.

Thomas De Quincey, who visited him in 1807, wrote that he "had so entirely dedicated himself to the service of his humble fellow countrymen, the hewers of wood and drawers of water in this southern region of Somersetshire, that for many miles round he was the arbiter of their disputes, the guide and counsellor of their daily lives". In 1817 Poole founded the Quantock Savings Bank. De Quincey later agreed with Coleridge's description of Poole as an ideal model for a useful Member of Parliament.

Coleridge himself continued to benefit from the old friendship: Poole helped to finance the poet's newspaper The Friend in 1809, and later young Hartley Coleridge's education at Oxford. In 1834 Coleridge died, leaving in his will four gold mourning rings to his wife and his three closest friends, including Poole. Poole himself died on 8 September 1837 at Nether Stowey, of pleurisy, at the age of 70.

De Quincey described Poole as "a stout plain-looking farmer". He was short and prematurely balding; slow and deliberate of speech; and his voice, the quality of which had been spoiled by snuff-taking, had a strong Somerset accent. His character is described by the Coleridge scholar Molly Lefebure as combining "idealism with strong practical common-sense, sound business acumen with a keen and stimulating intellect, and a robust sense of humour with great delicacy of feeling". This last characteristic was not invariable for he could be sententious and overbearing, so that his long-term friend Southey complained that "he was never content to be your friend, but he must be your saviour", nor was his temper to be implicitly relied on. He owes his place in literary history to his profound respect for the intellectual elite of his time, which, combined with his many fine personal qualities, enabled him to be an invaluable friend to Coleridge and others, and to live up to his own maxim, "Happy is the genius who has a friend ever near of good sense".
