= The Idiot Boy =

Poem by William Wordsworth

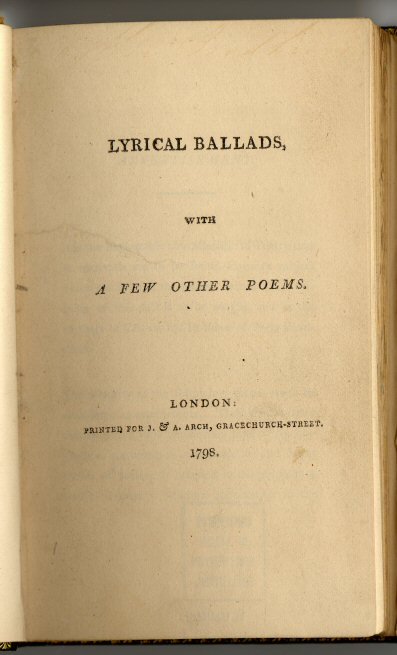
Title page of the first edition of Lyrical Ballads

"The Idiot Boy" is a poem written by William Wordsworth, a representative of the Romantic movement in English literature. The poem was composed in spring 1798 and first published in the same year in Lyrical Ballads, a collection of poems written by Wordsworth and Samuel Taylor Coleridge, which is considered to be a turning point in the history of English literature and the Romantic movement. The poem investigates such themes as language, intellectual disability, maternity, emotionality (excessive or otherwise), organisation of experience and "transgression of the natural."

"The Idiot Boy" is Wordsworth's longest poem in Lyrical Ballads (with 463 lines), although it is surpassed in length by Coleridge's "The Rime of the Ancient Mariner." It was the 16th poem of the collection in the original 1798 edition, and the 21st poem in the 1800 edition, which added Wordsworth's famous Preface to Lyrical Ballads.

== Summary of the plot ==
The poem tells the story of the titular "Idiot Boy," as well as his mother Betty Foy and their gravely ill neighbour Susan Gale. As Johnny's father, a woodsman, is away from home, Betty decides to send her son to the nearest town on horseback, so that he may bring with him a doctor who could help Susan. However, Johnny gets lost trying to reach the town at night, and his mother is forced to follow him. When she reaches the doctor's house, she realizes Johnny is not there and returns home in a state of agitation, anxiety, and fear, forgetting to bring the doctor with her. Eventually, Johnny is reunited with his mother, and their neighbour rises from her bed, miraculously cured.

== Form ==
The poem uses a five-line stanza of tetrameter lines, with a rhyming scheme of ABCCB, said to be a "variation on the long meter quatrain." It has been described as a realisation of the traditional form of the ballad, chiefly because of its "unobtrusive" narrator, as well as "an extreme example of the naive or rustic style in poetry."

=== Balladic Elements ===
The poem contains allusions to many romantic ballad commonplaces, connected mainly with Gottfried August Bürger's ballads "Lenore" and "The Wild Huntsman." This is exemplified mainly by the mock-heroic section of the poem (lines 322-356), as well as its opening stanza (lines 1-6), where moonlight and the presence of owls take centre stage as the attributes of the ballad:

'T'is eight o'clock – a clear March night,
'The moon is up – the sky is blue,
'The owlet in the moonlight air,
He shouts from nobody knows where
He lengthens out his lonely shout,
Halloo! halloo! a long halloo!

Johnny has been dubbed "a Quixotic hero," as well as a knight errant, and an allusion to Don Quixote has been found in the narrator's vision of Johnny hunting sheep in line 337 of the poem. He has been connected to "a long tradition of fools," as the poem explores his extraordinary, unorthodox perception of the world. The poem, however, seems to emphasise a defamiliarization of such clichés, rather than emulate them. The poem's connection to the ballad genre has also been described as tenuous, as it is said to exhibit a shift in focus from the exploration of a plot to the exploration of abstract feeling.

=== The Narrator ===
The narrator of "The Idiot Boy" is considered to be "comic," as well as "dramatized," "highly limited" and even "incompetent." He is described as a poetic figure "variously affected" by the story he narrates, and thus both "detached" from and "engaged" in the events of the poem. Though he is not directly involved in the story of the poem himself, certain qualities of his "may be inferred from [his] stylistic habits," as well as the parts of the poem in which he addresses his audience.

The narrator's attitude towards Johnny seems benevolent, however he criticises Betty with "a trace of patronizing condescension" in lines 22-26:

The world will say 'tis very idle,
Bethink you of the time of night;
There's not a mother, no not one.
But when she hears what you have done.
Oh! Betty she'll be in a fright.

Condescension may also be found in the narrator's description of Johnny as a "fierce and dreadful hunter," (338) as well as in his negative response to Betty's imaginings about her son's fate (lines 212-216).

So, through the moonlight lane she goes,
And far into the moonlight dale;
And how she ran, and how she walked,
And all that to herself she talked,
would surely be a tedious tale.

However, he is said to be just as much a source of speculation as she is, as he strives to "fill in the gaps of his story" with "fanciful adventure."

Out of ninety stanzas of the poem, approximately one third of them begin with the conjunctions "and," "but" or "so," which suggests that its narrator is focused chiefly on a simple, sequential retelling of the story. He also seems prone to simplifying the character's experience into simple binary opposites, such as when referring to the life or death of Susan Gale (52-56), in Betty's instructions to Johnny (62-66; "[h]ow to turn left and how to right") or in the description of her search for him (217-221).

In high and low, above, below,
ln great and small, in round and square,
In tree and tower was Johnny seen,
In bush and brake, in black and green,
'Twas Johnny, Johnny everywhere.

Despite this, some evidence of the narrator's skilfulness has been identified in his usage of humour and deliberate poetic structures, such as the recurring theme of the owls.

==== The Muses ====
The mock-heroic fragment of the poem (lines 322-356) may be read as a "self-conscious comment on the narrator's efforts," as he expresses affection towards his muses in a way similar to how Betty's affection towards Johnny is portrayed (compare "Ye muses! Whom I love so well" (356) with "Him whom she loves, her idiot boy" (lines 16 and 376). The narrator's appeal to the muses has also been described as a way to comment on the anxiousness which readers may experience expecting a full account of the titular character's "strange adventures" (351), as they would in more traditional sentimental stories.

In lines 347-348 the narrator claims that he has practised poetry (been "bound" to the muses) for fourteen years, which is a fact true about Wordsworth in the moment of writing the poem. These lines have been read to suggest the narrator's incompetence, as trades would typically be learnt in a period of seven years. However, the narrator has also been dubbed a "deliberately naïve version of [Wordsworth]," not to be confused with the author himself, but rather to be identified with a "narrow-minded" and "excessively genteel" style of poetry criticised by Wordsworth.

=== Humour ===
"The Idiot Boy's" tone is considered to be comedic. Its humour has been dubbed a "defence against the ominous threats facing Johnny," as well as a "burlesque" of the philosophical discourse of intellectual disability in the Enlightenment, as by "mocking the reader's sense of decorum" the poem seems to challenge literary and social preconceptions.

The sources of humour in the poem have been found in the contrast between the fragments devoted to Johnny and Betty and the elements of the narrator's mock-heroic voice, as well as the comedic force of Betty's failure to ask for the doctor's help joint with Susan's miraculous recovery. Thus, the poem's humour has been classified as "one of happy resolution."

== Characters and Themes ==
=== Moonlight and the Supernatural ===
Supernatural elements of the poem are found chiefly in Betty's visions of Johnny's undoing (lines 232-241) and in the narrator's mock-heroic section (322-356):

'Oh saints! what is become of him?
Perhaps he's climbed into an oak,
Where he will stay until he is dead;
Or, sadly he has been misled,
And joined the wandering gipsy-folk.

'Or him that wicked pony's carried
To the dark cave, the goblin's hall;
Or in the castle he's pursuing,
Among the ghosts his own undoing;
Or playing with the waterfall.'

Betty imagines her son's downfall to be caused by goblins (238) or ghosts (240), but the narrator disregards her concerns, describing them as "unworthy" and "wild":

Betty's superstitious speculation has been described as her way of dealing with her anxiety for Johnny – namely the fear of him dying (suggested by his "playing with the waterfall" in line 241). Her anxious behaviour is also found to contrast with the aura of peaceful "transcendence" evoked by the moonlight. The moon, in turn, is identified with Johnny's "other-worldliness," as he experiences the uncanniness of the night.

Despite its abundance of supernatural elements, the poem has been found to be focused rather on "social commentary" in line with Wordsworth's aim "to give the charm of novelty to things of every day" (as described by Coleridge).

=== Johnny Foy and Intellectual Disability ===
Johnny Foy exhibits non-normative behaviour and atypical verbal expression, which has led critics to interpret his condition as intellectual disability. "The Idiot Boy" is said to explore how such disabilities are mythologized in order to establish them as a proper subject for linguistic and psychologic deliberations, and it has been connected with "an emergent 'humane' understanding of cognitive difference."

The poem's usage of the term "idiot" has been said to carry "connotations of deficiency," and the word itself has been counted amongst those used "to provoke revulsion or to ostracize groups of people."

Johnny's condition is said to transgress "the limits of being," as well as the "binary oppositions of order and disorder, reason and idiocy, [...] purity and disgust." He has also been connected with the poem's subversion of romantic conventions, as he himself is free of any literary and socio-cultural preconceptions.

Although Johnny's and his mother's roles in the poem are discussed at length, his father is notably absent from the poem and only mentioned by his profession in lines 37-39.

==== Johnny's Joy and Poeticism ====
Michael Mason claims that Johnny experiences "Wordsworthian joy," a state in which a passive observer perceives natural phenomena "in themselves," with no outside point of reference, as illustrated by Johnny's misclassification of owl cries and the moon in lines 447-463:

For, while they all were travelling home,
Cried Betty 'Tell us, Johnny, do,
Where all this long night you have been,
What you have heard, what you have seen,
And, Johnny, mind you tell us true.'

Now Johnny all night long had heard
The owls in tuneful concert strive;
No doubt too he the moon had seen;
For in the moonlight he had been
From eight o'clock till five.

And thus, to Betty's question, he
Made answer, like a traveller bold
(His very words I give to you),
'The cocks did crow to-whoo, to-whoo,
And the sun did shine so cold,' –
Thus answered Johnny in his glory,
And that was all his travel's story.

This sense of joy has also been connected with an escape from the restrained world of rationality into one where language is "subordinate to feeling." Johnny's account of his journey has been said to present him as an "imaginative" and "poetic" figure, as he seems to creatively organise his new experience. However, although this is identified with "poetic insight," Johnny all the same fails to reach the doctor and let him help his neighbour.

This portrayal seems to criticise the popular perception of intellectually disabled people in the Enlightenment, as it would likely lead to Johnny being read as "revolting" or "inhuman" due to his disability, in line with Coleridge's remark that Wordsworth has not "taken sufficient care to preclude from the reader's fancy the disgusting images of ordinary, morbid idiocy."

Furthermore, Johnny's apparent lack of reason, contrasted with the suggestion that his horse is both capable of thought and that he "thinks of [Johnny] as 'what' rather than 'whom'" in lines 121-126, has been connected with John Locke's classification of "changelings" – a species between humans and animals.

But then he is a horse that thinks!
And when he thinks his pace is slack,
Now, though he knows poor Johnny well,
Yet for his life he cannot tell
What he has got upon his back.

Despite his failure, Johnny's experience is said to be "cathartic for [his] entire community," transforming it "into a more integral and caring" one, as he, his mother and their neighbour are once more brought together.

=== Abuse of Language ===
Abuse of language similar to Johnny's is prevalent throughout the poem, as exemplified by Susan's miraculous recovery, made possible when she recovers as she regains "control over her utterance," and by the doctor's ironic lines (262-271), which subvert the expectations one might hold towards a member of his profession and the principles of the Hippocratic Oath.

'Oh doctor! doctor! Where's my Johnny?'
'I'm here, what is't you want with me?'
'Oh sir! you know I'm Betty Foy,
And I have lost my poor dear boy,
You know him – him you often see;

'He's not so wise as some folks be.'
'The devil take his wisdom!' said
The doctor, looking somewhat grim,
'What, woman! should I know of him?'
And, grumbling, he went back to bed.

Even the narrator may be characterised by a similar linguistic inefficiency, as he is unable to continue his narrative in lines 352-356 due to what Gordon Thomas calls his "aphasia."

O gentle Muses! is this kind?
Why will ye thus my suit repel?
Why of your further aid bereave me?
And can ye thus unfriendly, leave me;
Ye Muses! whom I love so well.

Johnny's seemingly rational mother also fails to keep her composure throughout the poem, as signified by line 249 ("Unworthy things she talked and wild").

==== "Burring" ====
The word "burr" is often used in the poem (lines 19, 107, 115, 387) to refer to a sound made by Johnny, which has been classified as his "physiological response to the cold," as well as a mimicry of the owls, or his steed. Betty, however, interprets it as "the noise he loves" (line 110). This may be read as faulty, as the "burr" may not have any meaning to him after all, or, conversely, as accurate, as it may signify that Johnny's noises are "perfectly comprehensible" to him and his loved ones.

Burr, burr – now Johnny's lips they burr,
As loud as any mill, or near it;
Meek as a lamb the pony moves,
And Johnny makes the noise he loves,
And Betty listens, glad to hear it.

Johnny's "burring" has been likened to Wordsworth's own – that is, to his Northumberland accent, "characterized by a strong, guttural pronunciation of 'r,'" and to his narrator's stylistic mistakes, which suggest that his "competency as a storyteller is limited." These include overuse of repetition (lines 82-86, 92-96, 177-181), as well as distortion of "syntax for the sake of rhyme" (lines 365-366) and "an exaggerated inversion of normal word order" (in lines 34-36, in which the usage of the verb "ail" is simultaneously transitive and intransitive, and thus logically indecipherable).

But when the pony moved his legs,
Oh! then for the poor Idiot Boy!
For joy he cannot hold the bridle,
For joy his head and heels are idle,
He's idle all for very joy. (82-86)

[...]

Old Susan lies a-bed in pain,
And sorely puzzled are the twain,
For what she ails they cannot guess. (34-36)

This abuse of "poetic diction," however, has been characterised as an element of Wordsworth's critique of the use of popular language in poetry, and as "evidence not of Wordsworth's failure as a poet but of his skill" in "defining his dramatized narrator."

=== Betty Foy and "Maternal Passion" ===
In the Preface to Lyrical Ballads, Wordsworth expressed his aim to portray human nature by "tracing the maternal passion through many of its more subtle windings." Betty's approach to her son has, however, been dubbed by John Wilson as "almost unnatural" and by Coleridge as "an impersonation of an instinct abandoned by judgement," signifying that Wordsworth's contemporaries found the poem "lacking" in this regard.

Wilson's criticism of Betty's affection towards her son has been said to follow a sense of reciprocal sympathy described by Adam Smith in his Theory of Moral Sentiments, as, in that view, "no self-respecting mother ought to adore a son so indifferent to and incapable of returning love." Betty's inability to understand Johnny's burring has also been said to signify her being "incapable of representing him" in a perception of intellectual disability contemporary to Wordsworth.

Wordsworth's portrayal of Betty has been connected with the exploration of "his ability to love like a mother (totally, vulnerably or irrationally [...])," as even her and Johnny's surname (Foy) has been connected with the French word foi meaning faith.

Betty has also been ascribed the role of the poet due to her accounts of Johnny's adventure. This role, in turn, allows for the narrator to be read as her double, guilty of the same susceptibility to emotions in his reports, which "exposes [his] poetic pretension and lack of self-awareness." The narrator and Betty are therefore jointly described as "[representing] debased popular poets," whereas Johnny stands as "the heroic poet of the [creative] Imagination," as opposed to their superfluous fancy.

== Reception ==
"The Idiot Boy" was counted amongst Lyrical Ballads' most experimental and controversial poems in the perception of its early reviewers. In the period of 1798-1800 it was reprinted only once, in 80 lines, in the issue of Critical Review for October 1798, in which it was famously criticised by Robert Southey as "[resembling] a Flemish picture in the worthlessness of its design and the excellence of its execution."

The poem was generally negatively described by John Wilson and Coleridge. William Hazlitt wrote that he felt "a chaunt in the recitation" of the poems declaimed to him by Wordsworth and Coleridge, including "The Idiot Boy, which would "[act] as a spell upon the hearer, and [disarm] the judgment". Hazlitt's remarks may suggest that despite any criticism he might have had towards the poems delaimed, they were signified by an effective use of meter (though possibly misleadingly so).

Marilyn Butler writes that "most of the [reviewers of the Lyrical Ballads] praised poems which use an elevated language and subject, like 'Tintern Abbey,' and attacked those using a 'mean' language and subject, like 'The Idiot Boy.'" In line with this, Janina Nordius comments that "great talent wasted on a dubious topic seems to be the dominant critical view" of the poem, and Roger Murray claims that "no one has warmly defended" it. Murray also finds the poem to have "too little grace [...] ever to be ranked alongside Wordsworth's greatest poems," though he sees its portrayal of Betty as its saving grace.

Conversely, Michael Mason remarked that "The Idiot Boy," as one of "the more ballad-like of Wordsworth's contributions [in Lyrical Ballads,] was generally well received," and Albert E. Wilhelm claimed it was "one of Wordsworth's best known but least appreciated" poems.

=== Quality ===
The "Idiot Boy" been described as "incongruous" and as "a failure" by Geoffrey H. Hartman, as its repetitions "draw too much attention to Wordsworth's own 'burring,'" Joshua King argues, however, that such features are "what make[s] [the poem] interesting," as they suggest "a human community made possible by blind patterns of sensation, pleasure and habit, rather than primarily by rationality and linguistic ability."

Jonathan Wordsworth dubbed the poem a "comic masterpiece" and "an almost faultless work of art," as well as "a creation of exquisite tact, at once humorous and deeply moving." In line with this, John F. Danby comments that the tone of the poem is "beautifully mock-solemn and yet indulgently ready with its sympathy," and Daniel Robinson claims that "the warm comedic tones, which never mock the boy, complement perfectly the affection his mother feels, and the affection [the] reader ought to feel for him," though the poem "subverts the sentimentality readers would have expected from a poem on mental disability in a newspaper or magazine of the time." Although the poem "appears frivolous" with its "feminine rhymes, overblown diction and laughable characters," Karen Guendel argues that it warrants a second, more in-depth look due to its subversion of expectations and metaliterary critique of its own narrator.

Wordsworth's transgressions have, however, been noted by Anne McWhir to "[prevent] us from noticing" his perpetuation of the binary oppositions of what is vulgar and proper, as he strives to select the latter kind of language for his poetry. Zoe Beenstock has also criticised the poem's aims at recontextualising intellectual disability, claiming that Wordsworth "remains focused on the able-bodied interlocutors who learn to value their own freedom by watching the spectacle of disability and dependence."

=== Responses to Johnny ===
Responses to Johnny's condition seem to range from condescending dismissal to explorations of his state of being which classify it as serious, "in touch with the divine" or "extra human," as he is found to have access to "other dimensions" of perception, both "natural and divine." Johnny has even been said to represent an ideal Wordsworthian poet, a liminal figure "between childhood and manhood," as well as "the earthly and the divine," due to his disability.

Daniel Robinson argues that "although calling Johnny an 'idiot' seems callous," he is portrayed "without sentimentality or pathos and with great respect." On the negative side, Wordsworth's portrayal of Johnny has also been described as "ludicrous."

=== Responses to Betty ===
Joshua King claims that the author's contemporaries were unable to sympathise with Betty Foy, as her love for Johnny transgressed their "standards of propriety," defined by "rationality and the clear use of language." Conversely, modern criticism has largely found the poem "faithful to [Wordsworth's] objective."

Roger Murray claims that "The Idiot Boy" displays "the evolution" of a mother's mind. He also finds Betty to be the true main character of the poem, instead of Johnny, as it is mainly her search for Johnny that the narrative follows. Similarly, G. H. Durrant claims that "the essential meaning of the poem" is conveyed in how Betty's love "leads [Johnny] safely and serenely through [his] perils," while she "suffers fear and anguish on his behalf." Zachary Leader, however, argues for the opposite, claiming that it is Johnny's "oddity" that "takes centre stage" in the poem.

Karen Guendel has noted that the poem "invites us to question Betty's judgement," and that, in light of her reckless decision to send out her son into the night and her failure to acquire help for her neighbour, it is her fancy that motivates her decision-making, rather than her love for Johnny or her rationality, as she "daydreams idly, casting Johnny and herself as the hero and heroine of various shopworn plots." This, according to Guendel, may be read as Wordsworth's critique of sensationalist popular literature.

=== Author's Comments ===
Wordsworth commented on the "purpose" of the poem in the 1802 Preface to Lyrical Ballads, saying that it adheres to his goal to "follow the fluxes and refluxes of the mind when agitated by the great and simple affectations of our nature" by "tracing the maternal passion through many of its more subtle windings." In the Fenwick Notes he explained:

The last stanza—'the Cocks did crow to-whoo, to-whoo, And the sun did shine so cold' was the foundation of the whole. The words were reported to me by my dear friend, Thomas Poole; but I have since heard the same repeated of other Idiots. Let me add that this long poem was composed in the groves of Alfoxden, almost extempore; not a word, I believe, being corrected, though one stanza was omitted. I mention this in gratitude to those happy moments, for, in truth, I never wrote anything with so much glee.

— Lyrical Ballads, 2nd ed., ed. Michael Mason (2007)

Wordsworth's fondness of the poem has been identified "a frustrated desire for his dead mother," Ann Wordsworth, though this claim has also been disputed as too simplistic an assumption. His and his narrator's pleasure in narration have also been connected with the exploration of transgressive maternal love, melancholy and "the originary deviance of poetry."

Wordsworth's sister, Dorothy Wordsworth, was similarly "enchanted" with the poem.

==== Responses to Criticism ====
Wordsworth defended the poem against John Wilson's critique in his letter from 7 June 1802, claiming that his negative response to "an Idiot" as the subject of the poem was caused by "petty social prejudice" of the higher social strata, enabled by their ability to isolate themselves from intellectually disabled people. He also commented that he wrote the poem with "exceeding delight and pleasure," and claimed that his usage of the word "idiot" was unavoidable, as he knew no better word "to which we had attached passion" to replace it with, mentioning "lack-wit," "half-wit," and "witless" as alternatives. This has been read as a signal of him "[aiming] at the semantic reorientation" of the word.

Wordsworth has been said to exoticize and glorify intellectually disabled people in his letter to Wilson, granting them "visionary privilege."

I have often applied to Idiots in my own mind, that sublime expression of scripture that, "their life is hidden with God" (Colossians 3:3). [...] I have indeed often looked upon the conduct of fathers and mothers of the lower classes of society towards Idiots as the great triumph of the human heart. It is there that we see the strength, disinterestedness, and grandeur of love [...].

He also partially conceded to Wilson's concept of repulsion towards intellectual disability as an element of human nature, as what he claimed was the factor distinguishing Johnny from other intellectually disabled people, "usually disgusting in their persons," was his ability to produce speech.

== Connections with other works ==
- "The Idiot Boy" as well as Wordsworth's "The Somersetshire Tragedy" have been connected with Thomas Poole's "John Walford" – an account of a murder of an intellectually disabled woman called Jenny by her husband.
- Shortly before the publication of Lyrical Ballads, on 30 June 1798 issue of The Morning Post there appeared a poem titled "The Idiot" written by Robert Southey. In line with the contemporary "standards of correctness," the poem avoids using a word similar to Johnny's "burr" when describing the sounds made by an intellectually disabled person, instead using the phrase "half artic'late call" (line 10).
- Johnny's voyage has been compared with the journey to the underworld taken by Virgil's Aeneas in the Aeneid, as the "holly-bough" that Johnny holds in his hand (mentioned in lines 57-61 and 87-91) seems to allude to the golden bough which Aeneas sought for safety in his travel, and as Virgil's depiction of the underworld seems to reflect Betty's vision of Johnny's ill fate. The maternal love of Betty has also been connected with Cyrene's strength-endowing "effluence" from Virgil's Georgics.
- Charles Dickens' Barnaby Rudge has been said to "[owe] something of his origin to Johnny Foy", as they share "an undefined, good-natured dementia" and are "most fully connected with humanity through the unfailing devotion of their respective mothers."
- The poem's narrator has been compared to Laurence Sterne's Tristram Shandy, as they both have difficulty finishing their stories, and their respective invocations appear only towards the end of both works.
- Johnny's account of his voyage has been connected with Henry Vaughan's "The Night," as "the paradoxical interplay between sun and moon, heat and cold, darkness and light" is likewise key to Vaughan's poem.

=== Other Works by Wordsworth ===
- Wordsworth described "The Idiot Boy" along with his "The Mad Mother" as poems pertaining to "maternal passion" in the Preface to Lyrical Ballads.
- Wordsworth mentions the plot of "The Idiot Boy" in book XIV of his autobiographical poem The Prelude (lines 397-406). "The Idiot Boy" has also been likened to the Winander boy episode of Book V of The Prelude, as both Johnny and the Winander boy echo the sound of the owls. The Snowdon episode of Book XIII of the 1805 edition of The Prelude, as well as Wordsworth's "A Night Piece," have been connected with "The Idiot Boy" as pieces "featuring a lunar epiphany."
- The moonlight is also mentioned in Wordsworth's "Peter Bell," which seems to allude to Johnny's journey, and has even been dubbed the poem's sequel.
- The narrator's appeal to the muses has been connected with Wordsworth's "Simon Lee," the speaker of which similarly seems to "[rebuke] his reader for wanting sentimental stories and arousing incidents."
- Johnny has been grouped with the leach-gatherer from "Resolution and Independence", Luke from "Michael" and Lucy Gray as Wordsworth's "[intermediaries] between [nature] and man".
- The poem has been grouped with other "Pre-Goslar poems with vagrants or itinerants as subjects," such as "The Thorn," "The Mad Mother," "Old Man Travelling" and "The Complaint of a forsaken Indian Woman" as allusions to their "substantial literary precedents (wandering bard or minstrel; pilgrim; knight-errant)."

=== Connections with Coleridge ===
- The poem has been compared with Coleridge's "Christabel" as "particularly valuable in tandem" due to their "complementary" explorations "of language, [its] divinity [...] and how [its] use and misuse [...] may at once both reveal and hide thoughts".
- The poem has been connected with Coleridge's "The Rhyme of the Ancient Mariner" as well as Wordsworth's "The Female Vagrant" as "a more light-hearted instance of [their] pattern of departure and return." Moreover, "both Johnny and the [Mariner] have imaginative experiences illuminated by moonlight," and both poems "conclude with a provocative undercutting of narrative expectations."
- Coleridge's Osorio has also been noted to anticipate the motives of the owls, moonlight, caverns and the waterfall found in "The Idiot Boy."

=== Parody ===
- Wordsworth complains about an apparent parody of his poem written by Peter Bayley in his letter to Walter Scott from 16 October 1803. The poem was titled "The Fisherman's Wife."
- The poem has been alluded to in an anonymously published poem called "Benjamin the Wagonner, A Ryghte merrie and conceited Tale in Verse" printed in the 1819 Literary Gazette. Just as "The Idiot Boy" describes the "happy, happy, happy John" (96), the parody speaks of "Happy, happy, happy people / Happy, ignorant of law," imagined by Wordsworth on a visit to "a fanciful country."
- George Byron alluded to "The Idiot Boy" in lines (259-266) of his 1840 poem called "English Bards and Scotch Reviewers: A Satire."
