= Turning the Tables =

Turning the Tables may refer to:

- Turning the Tables (film), a 1919 silent film
- Turning the Tables (book), by Andrew P. Haley
- Turning the Tables: From Housewife to Inmate and Back Again, 2016 book by Teresa Giudice
- "Turning the Tables", the second episode of the documentary series Making a Murderer

== See also ==
- Table-turning, a type of seance
- "Turning Tables", a song by Adele
- "The Tables Turned", a poem by William Wordsworth
