= Anecdote for Fathers =

1798 poem by William Wordsworth

"Anecdote for Fathers" (full title: "Anecdote for Fathers, Shewing how the practice of Lying may be taught" ) is a poem by William Wordsworth first published in his 1798 collection titled Lyrical Ballads, which was co-authored by Samuel Taylor Coleridge. A later version of the poem from 1845 contains a Latin epigraph from Praeparatio evangelica: "Retine vim istam, falsa enim dicam, si coges," which translates as "Restrain that force, for I will tell lies if you compel me."

== Synopsis ==
The poem assumes the point of view of a father who recalls taking a walk with his five-year-old son, Edward, at Lyswin farm. During the walk the man contemplates his two favourite locations—the Liswyn farm and Kilve's shore—and his current emotions. Later, the narrator asks Edward whether he prefers Liswyn or Kilve. Having received “Kilve” as an answer with no further explanation, he continuously presses the child for more details. The boy justifies his preference by the absence of a weathervane in Kilve.

== Background ==
Five-year-old Edward from “Anecdote for Fathers”, as stated by Wordsworth himself, was based on a boy named Basil—the son of Wordsworth's friend, Basil Montagu. Wordsworth and his sister, Dorothy, looked after little Basil, who at the time of writing “Anecdote for Fathers” “had now been with the Wordsworths for three years”. Despite Wordsworth's explicit identification of the boy as Basil Montagu's son, and many critics promoting that reading, Simpson suggests that the inspiration for the figure of Edward may have come from Caroline, the poet's daughter with a French woman named Annette Vallon. Thompson makes use of Simpson's analogy concerning the children's age and puts forward a theory that Edward was modelled on Maria, the child of John Thelwall—another one of Wordsworth's friends. Wordsworth possibly learned about Maria from Thelwall's poems and letters and got inspired by her connection with the rural region as described by Thelwall in his writings. Thelwall's relationship with Wordsworth is also thought to be the inspiration behind the nature of the conversation in the poem. Due to his radical views, John Thelwall was sentenced for treason and later acquitted. Wordsworth mentions Thelwall's trial in his commentary on the setting of the poem given to Isabella Fenwick. The interrogations that occurred right after it may be reflected in the poem, as it introduces the atmosphere of control and repression. Little Edward becomes there "a defendant being grilled by an aggressive prosecutor". The locations mentioned in "Anecdote for Fathers" cause disagreement among the scholars. Although many claim "that 'Kilve' (…) refers to Racedown and 'Liswyn farm' to Alfoxden" (both Racedown and Alfoxden being residences of the Worthsworths, which they occupied with little Basil Montagu), there is evidence for the name 'Lyswin farm' emerging from Llyswen, where John Thelwall retired.

== Structure ==
=== Verse form ===
"Anecdote for Fathers" consists of fifteen quatrains. The rhyme scheme is regular throughout the whole text (ABAB) and accompanied by "a ballad meter of three tetrameters and a trimeter", which varies a bit from the typical ballad stanza by incorporating some of the elements of Long Meter.

=== Language and narration ===
The language in "Anecdote for Fathers" is not very figurative, although some simple metaphors appear ("then did the boy his tongue unlock", "his limbs were cast in beauty's mould"). The style of the poem has been characterized as repetitive, and as such conveying the ineffectiveness of the father's questions and the meaninglessness of the child's answers, which in turn renders their dialogue pointless and the communication between the two impossible. Another way in which the problematic nature of the father and the son's communication is conveyed in the poem is through the use of a multitude of polar oppositions which are the foundation for the structure of the poem, such as adult and child, nature and culture, presence and absence, intuition and reason. Some critics believe that "Anecdote for Fathers", although formally a dialogue, is in fact monologic in character, which makes the interaction between the father and his son resemble an "interrogation" or "coercion". The narration is predominantly generated by the questions uttered and repeated by the father. However, despite the circumstances, little Edward is able to shield himself from the oppression by using "agential language", which is "the art of lying", as implied by the title of the poem.

== Main themes ==
=== Parent vs child ===
The primary opposition presented in the poem is one between an adult (parent) and a child, with the former being nervous and obstinate and the latter—calmer and more withdrawn. The father seems to be central to his narration, focusing mainly on his own emotions and experiences, as well as asserting his dominance and authority over Edward. The juxtaposition of the two characters depicts the gap between adults and children as conceptualized in the Romantic period. The forced exchange between the father and the son may be read as moralistic, especially considering the subtitle and the epigraph of the poem. They outline the author's critique of parental oppression and pedagogical approach to upbringing. The poem "question[s] the deep-rooted contemporary assumption that the correct adult stance toward the child should be one of guidance and 'instruction'". It also demonstrates two types of paternal abuse—verbal and physical—that this kind of coercive approach may involve. The last stanza, in which the father states that he is able to learn from his son more than he could ever teach him, may suggest that the situation described in the poem makes him realize his mistake and draw a lesson from it. Thus, the subtitle and the epigraph express that moral understood by the father in the course of the poem. However, the concluding stanza of "Anecdote for Fathers" has also been read as incompatible with such a message of the whole poem. The sudden shift of the father's attitude and his enlightenment has been seen as unconvincing and potentially superficial. Following this line of interpretation, the father may be read as not learning a lesson from his inefficient small talk; instead, he decides to stay comfortably in his predetermined set of reasonable truths and principles. In fact, him regarding Edward's answer as a lie—just as the readers are prompted to do by the subtitle and the epigraph—might be improper, as it is not a lie for the child itself; it is simply the effect of his parents' urgency in the quest for logic.

=== Nature vs culture ===
Another polar opposition in the poem is that of nature and culture. This is a very common trait in Wordsworth's poetry. Nature is assigned to Edward, who is a "noble savage[ ]" with a "mentalit[y] rooted in a transcendentalized nature". He is often described in words evoking natural imagery, such as a "fair and fresh" face, or "rustic dress". Him choosing Kilve is another manifestation of his connection to nature, since the place is situated on the coast and, unlike the "well-husbanded setting of Liswyn Farm" is characterized by "natural wildness and lack of civilisation". It is also associated by the father with previous positive experiences. Even though for him they belong to the past and he prefers to be focused on here and now, Edward is not so distanced from those memories and is still able to unconsciously appreciate "Kilve's delightful shore". The father, on the other hand, is closer to the cultural extreme. This results from his age and experience of loss, demonstrated in the poem through his recollection of "former pleasures". The symbolism of the "weather-cock" is said to further support the above opposition. Bernstein calls the object on the roof a "totem" as it mediates between the artificial and the natural, being a product of civilisation that, nonetheless, imitates an animal and is moved by the wind.

=== Thought vs feeling ===
The opposition between thought and feeling is combined with another one—past (absence) versus present (presence). This is manifested through the figure of the father who creates a "familiar schemata (…), comparing everything either explicitly or implicitly to other experiences, past or potential". The only actual sensation that can be ascribed to him is that of nostalgia, and this is what somehow connects him with his son. Contrary to the man's intellectual capacity, the son relies on intuitive thinking to answer his father's persistent questions. He is not concerned with the prosaic, material objects and able to exceed his parents' analytical thinking. Although the parent forces Edward to apply logic and justification to his words, they are based on his inner feeling and characterized by spontaneity and lack of constraints. The father is also criticized for being detached from his childhood memories and instincts, which also prevents him from getting along with his son.

== Connection with "We Are Seven" ==
"We Are Seven" is one of Wordsworth's poems repeatedly mentioned alongside "Anecdote for Fathers". The two poems are placed one after the other in all editions of Lyrical Ballads. They both introduce child figures who are believed to have been inspired by the children Wordsworth met in his life—Basil Montagu and a girl from the Goodrich Castle. The main similarity between the poems is their structure built upon various polar oppositions, with the nature-culture one in the centre. Both texts express this opposition through the conflicted figures of an adult and a child, whose miscommunication and "alienation" are triggered by the adult speaker's seemingly simple question. In each case, the readers feel more empathetic towards the children. The speakers are presented as the ones being oppressive and nagging, whereas the children attempt to defend themselves through acts most natural to them. The initial dialogue, then, transforms into an interrogative monologue. The narration of the poems uncovers the speakers' lack of comprehension of their own emotions and experiences, as well as their need for validation from children. The little boy and girl represent Wordsworth's vision of idealized childhood defined by "eternal innocence". Ultimately, the two questions posed to them by the speakers hold much more depth that it seems. The speakers—and thus the readers—are challenged to uncover a significant but universal gap between the adult's and the child's attitude and their modes of perception of the world. Although the title of "Anecdote for Fathers" may suggest otherwise, both poems are not typical anecdotes whose aim is to teach a simple edifying lesson. Instead, by juxtaposing "the rationalizing adult" and the "child's intransigent refusal to accept his categories", Wordsworth reveals his unwillingness to moralize.
