= Animal Tranquillity and Decay, A Sketch =

"Animal Tranquillity and Decay, A Sketch", also known as "Old Man travelling", is a poem written by William Wordsworth. It was published in 1800 in the second edition of Lyrical Ballads – a collection of poems created in collaboration with Samuel Taylor Coleridge. The poem is estimated to have been composed either in late 1796 or early 1797. "Old Man Travelling" used to be a part of another poem by William Wordsworth, called "The Old Cumberland Beggar", devised as a description of the eponymous beggar; however, "Old Man Travelling" was completed earlier and made into a separate piece. The poem has been referred to as "a short sequel" to "The Old Cumberland Beggar", and Wordsworth himself regarded it as "an overflowing" of it. The form of the poem has been described as "a sonnet-like poem in two acts". It consists of one stanza written in blank verse.

The poem describes an old man and the journey he is on. It also touches upon the relationship the man has with the nature surrounding him and – except for the final version of the poem published in 1815 – it relates his encounter with the speaker. The narrator asks the old man a question about the objective of his journey, to which the man replies that he is on his way to see his dying son.

== Title and Content Changes ==
The poem was first released in 1798 under the title "Old Man Travelling" with the subtitle "Animal Tranquillity and Decay, A Sketch". In the next edition of Lyrical Ballads, which came out in 1800, the subtitle became the official title. In the same edition Wordsworth also decided to refrain from using the name "Old Man Travelling". According to Wolfson, he might have done it so as to avoid emphasizing the ironic undertone of the poem – the contrast between the lyrical sketch and the violent imagery of war – as well as to "stabilise a harmony of pathos".

The first changes in the text occurred in the 1800 edition of Lyrical Ballads. In this version, the old man's speech transformed from "direct speech into reported speech". Ulin comments that Wordsworth introduced the revision in order to make the old man seem less independent as a character, as well as to reduce the social distance between him and the speaker, marked in the 1798 version by the man addressing the speaker as "Sir". In the 1815 version, only the first 14 lines of the poem were published, the last 6 lines of the original being skipped there.

== Historical and Political Context ==
The poem contains certain political allusions. According to Bugg, the reader's understanding of Wordsworth's commentary on the state of politics provided in spite of the "repressive climate" is what makes the poem so impactful. The location of the old man's son's arrival is intentional – by mentioning Falmouth, a military port, Wordsworth alludes to the war that Great Britain waged against the French revolutionaries in the 1790s. Benis argues that the poem is "directly critical of official authority". The exchange between the old man and the gentleman – presented in the form of direct speech in the 1798 version – illustrates a clash of viewpoints; the old man represents a person affected by the conflict between England and France, and the speaker – someone who benefits from it. By giving the old man a chance to speak for himself, Wordsworth confronts the reader with the drastic reality and "harsh dailiness of war". Considering the political situation of Britain at the time, discourse condemning the government's doings seemed "unpatriotic, even seditious". According to Lucas, the changes the author introduced within the poem illustrate Wordsworth's final disconnection from his former radical beliefs and support for the French Revolution, and eventual subscription to the conservative, Tory views.

== Analyses and Interpretations ==
=== Relationship between the Two Parts of the Poem ===
The original version of the poem consists of twenty lines, and splits into two parts divided by a dash – the first fourteen lines are descriptive, while the other six report an exchange between the speaker and the old man. The first part – referred to as "the sketch" – is written in present tense in its entirety.

Due to the fact that the two parts are so vastly different, the essence of the poem has been located in "one of the parts, rather than in the relation between them" by some scholars. Some of them believe that the character's speech is "incongruous" in comparison to the descriptive part. Notwithstanding the jump from the more poetic, lyrical mode into the narrative one, which is more ingrained in the "social and geopolitical reality", the latter has been said to give an impression of being just as "stagy and generic" as the former. The fact that Wordsworth decided to omit the final six lines in the 1815 version of the poem has made some critics believe that they are right in their judgement of its inessentiality. Langbaum is of the opinion that removing the final dialogue was a good choice on Wordsworth's part, as the recount of where the man is heading and why is "uninteresting". Bialostosky, however, argues that the two parts can be united by examining the narrator's motives. Instead of being told the story, the reader gets to experience the contrast between the peaceful beginning and the disheartening ending of the poem in the same way the narrator did, and the "manipulation" of "the reader's poetic expectations" is used for the sake of the inclusion of the reader in the experience.

=== The Old Man and The Speaker ===
The man himself is not given a voice in the first part of the poem. Ulin suggests that the focus is not on the old man as a person, but rather as the speaker's idea of him. His lack of individuality only adds to the fact that the man is meant to serve as a representative of "a type" of person.

In the latter part the old man answers the question asked by the speaker – who, according to Owen, should be identified with Wordsworth. Bialostosky finds the interaction strange – taking into account the narrator's presuppositions about the man, he "seems already to have answered his own question". The image of the old man that his interlocutor "created with envy" is far from reality; however, it is a part of a juxtaposition that Wordsworth may have wanted to achieve. The old man's words change the atmosphere of the poem – "reflective melancholy" disappears, and the speaker gets a chance to interact with a character that no longer resembles "a type". Given the chance to speak, the old man gains his individuality. He refers to the speaker as "Sir", which, as Lucas points out, makes the speaker a "type" of a character, instead; it identifies him as someone of a higher status who was in favour of the war against Napoleon.

=== The Old Man and the Nature ===
Scholars take interest in the two opening lines – "The little hedge-row birds/ That peck along the road, regard him not" – especially in regard to the birds' reaction to the old man, or the absence of it. This introduction purposefully puts the focus on the birds, not the man himself. Owen proposes two interpretations regarding the lack of reaction of either party: he sees it at serving to emphasize either the lack of connection between them, or on the contrary, the unity that allows them to coexist. In the latter interpretation, the birds are not alarmed and do not get startled when the old man passes near them, because they do not see him as a threat, similarly to how they would not pay attention to other animals that could not harm them.

Water is a significant element in Lyrical Ballads, and in the case of the "Old Man Travelling", the mention of the military port in Falmouth – and a hospital for returning soldiers, in which the son of the old man is located – represents "the exigencies of war".

=== Travelling ===
The old man is referred to as an epitome of "the positively idle, solitary traveller". The lines "A man who does not move with pain, but moves / With thought" point to the fact that the way the man is travelling is "an intellectual pleasure", which comes only with experience and is a right which is not a given, but rather has to be gained. It is not just the thoughts that guide him, but also the nature ("by nature led"), which only adds emphasis to the fact that the man finds the power within him subconsciously. Travelling in itself has "existential significance" in Wordsworth's writing – and Romanticism in general – as it could shed light on the self within and lead up to "personal revelation and renovation".

Lines nine and ten – "Long patience … / That patience now …" compare two kinds of patience; the first one depends on the passage of time and can be gained as one gets older, and the latter – patience for the current situation – is redundant for the old man, because he has already acquired the former one. In the same manner, old man's travelling "with thought" represents "thoughtful idleness", as opposed to the kind of travelling without this kind of enhancement. Because of the advantages he had gained over the years, the old man can also elude certain obstacles, such as pain or the need for endurance, which is something inexperienced people cannot do – "the young behold / With envy …".

Opinions of the critics on whether the poem follows similar agendas to those followed by "The Old Cumberland Beggar" are divided. Chandler believes that these two poems differ in that aspect, and that "Old Man Travelling" is free from ideologies adopted by the other poem; Benis, however, says that "Old Man Travelling" addresses the problematic status of vagrants. Not only the objective of the old man's travel, but also the "long, unsupervised" journey in itself is a reference to politics, namely criticism regarding the power of authority. The old man acts according to his own will rather than following the governmental guidelines, which could make him subject to punishment for vagrancy, but since he is travelling to say goodbye to his dying son, who is a veteran – his status as a vagrant-traveller is ambiguous and he is likely to be excused.

According to the critics, the "sketch" does not only relate the man's journey on a physical level, but also "assimilate[s] the old man to the silence and impassiveness of nature". The old man, who is "… one by whom / All effort seem forgotten", is perceived as a person who, having achieved everything there is to achieve, has already reached the destination of his journey as a human, letting the natural world take the lead, and this poise is what the young narrator seems to envy.
