= This Lime-Tree Bower My Prison =

Poem by Samuel Taylor Coleridge (1797)

This Lime-Tree Bower My Prison is a poem written by Samuel Taylor Coleridge during 1797. The poem discusses a time in which Coleridge was forced to stay beneath a lime tree while his friends were able to enjoy the countryside. Within the poem, Coleridge is able to connect to his friends' experience and enjoy nature through them, making the lime tree only a physical prison, not a mental one.

== Background ==
During summer 1797, Coleridge was surrounded by many friends, including John Thelwall, William and Dorothy Wordsworth, Charles Lamb, Thomas Poole, and his wife Sara Fricker. During this time, he would relax, enjoy the surroundings, and work on poetry. However, there were problems between him and his wife, and she suffered from a miscarriage at the end of July. It was within this setting that Coleridge composed a poem while left alone at Poole's property underneath a lime tree while Lamb, the Wordsworths, and his wife went on a journey across the Quantocks. The poem was dedicated to Lamb, Fricker, and the generic friends, but Fricker's name was left out of the published edition. Coleridge later explained to Robert Southey that he stayed behind because his wife "accidentally emptied a skillet of boiling milk on my foot, which confined me during the whole time of C. Lamb's stay."

The location of Poole's home was Nether Stowey, which contained a garden, an arbour, and a tannery, and a little cottage that Coleridge stayed in while working on poetry. The arbour, containing the lime tree, was a place that Coleridge favoured in a note to Poole's edition of Coleridge's poems: "I love to shut my eyes, and bring before my imaginations that Arbour, in which I have repeated so many of these compositions to you. Dear Arbour! An Elysium to which I have often passed by your Cerberus, and Tartarean tan-pits!". The first version of the poem was sent in a letter to Southey and was only 56 lines. The 1800 edition, the first published edition, was 76 lines long. The poem was also revised and published under another name in Southey's Annual Anthology. A later revised edition was included in Sibylline Leaves, Coleridge's 1817 collection of poems.

== Poem ==
The poem begins by explaining how the narrator was separated from his friends:

Well, they are gone, and here must I remain,
This lime-tree bower my prison! I have lost
Beauties and feelings, such as would have been
Most sweet to my remembrance even when age
Had dimm'd mine eyes to blindness! They, meanwhile,
Friends, whom I never more may meet again,
On springy heath, along the hill-top edge,
Wander in gladness, and wind down, perchance,
To that still roaring dell, of which I told;

— lines 1–9

The poem then describes the journey in the Quantocks from Lamb's point of view, and then goes on to describe Lamb:

Now, my Friends emerge
Beneath the wide wide Heaven—and view again
The many-steepled tract magnificent
Of hilly fields and meadows, and the sea,
With some fair bark, perhaps, whose sails light up
The slip of smooth clear blue betwixt two Isles
Of purple shadow! Yes! they wander on
In gladness all; but thou, methinks, most glad,
My gentle-hearted Charles! for thou hast pined
And hunger'd after Nature, many a year,
In the great City pent, winning thy way
With sad yet patient soul, through evil and pain
And strange calamity! [...]

— lines 20–32

Twilight is described as calming and the poem continues with night's fall:

And that walnut-tree
Was richly ting'd, and a deep radiance lay
Full on the ancient ivy, which usurps
Those fronting elms, and now, with blackest mass
Makes their dark branches gleam a lighter hue
Through the late twilight: and though now the bat
Wheels silent by, and not a swallow twitters,
Yet still the solitary humble-bee
Sings in the bean-flower! Henceforth I shall know
That Nature ne'er deserts the wise and pure;
No plot so narrow, be but Nature there,
No waste so vacant, but may well employ
Each faculty of sense, and keep the heart
Awake to Love and Beauty! and sometimes
'Tis well to be bereft of promis'd good,
That we may lift the soul, and contemplate
With lively joy the joys we cannot share.
My gentle-hearted Charles! when the last rook
Beat its straight path across the dusky air
Homewards, I blest it! deeming its black wing
(Now a dim speck, now vanishing in light)
Had cross'd the mighty Orb's dilated glory,
While thou stood'st gazing; or, when all was still,
Flew creeking o'er thy head, and had a charm
For thee, my gentle-hearted Charles, to whom
No sound is dissonant which tells of Life.

— lines 51–76

== Themes ==
The use of blank verse is to emphasise the conversational elements of the poem in a similar manner to William Cowper's The Task. Like Cowper's, Coleridge's verse allows for alternations of tone and emphasises both country and urban environments. However, Coleridge is more concrete than Cowper in the sense that the ego stands in the foreground - in The Task the I, though dominant, purports to follow its subject matter. In "This Lime-Tree Bower My Prison" Coleridge attempts to discover the environment that his friends explore because he is unable to join them. This was accomplished in the original version by first describing how his friends came to be walking and then discussing Lamb's experience on the walk. The work introduces religious imagery but in a toned down form out of deference to Lamb's Unitarianism and perhaps partly out of Coleridge's own pantheistic feelings.

This Lime-Tree Bower continues the "Conversation poems" theme of "One Life", a unity between the human and the divine in nature. The poem links Coleridge's surroundings under the lime tree to the Quantocks where the Wordsworths, Lamb, and Fricker were out walking. Although they are all separated, Coleridge connects to his distant friends by their mutual experience and appreciation of nature. As the poem ends, the friends share together the same view about completion and life.

The poem uses the image of loneliness and solitude throughout. The narrator is forced to stay behind, but he is glad that his friends, especially Lamb, are able to enjoy the walk. The narrator is able to relax and be accepting of his situation and of nature, and the experience shows that his prison condition is perfectly tolerable because it is physical and not mental. The image of the solitary bee is used to represent the poet continuing his work in a world overcome by peace and harmony. The final moments of the poem contain a religious element and works like an evening prayer.

== Sources ==
The poem finds its source in many of Coleridge's own poems, including Composed while Climbing Brockley Coomb, Reflections on Having Left a Place of Retirement and To Charles Lloyd, on his Proposing to Domesticate with the Author. However, it is also connected to poems by others, including Wordsworth's Lines Left upon a Seat in a Yew-tree, passages from Southey's edition of Poems, and verses in Henry Vaughan's Silex Scintillans. He also cites from Withering's An Arrangement of British Plants.

== Critical response ==
Geoffrey Yarlott points out that the narrator's description of his scenery and condition "presents a clearer picture of what rapport with nature means than do the majority of [Coleridge's] formal Theistic passages. He writes now with his eye upon the object rather than the clouds, and with natural feelings. Where, earlier, he had seemed too much upon the stretch, as though trying to compel acceptance, he writes now with relaxed and easy confidence."

Later, Richard Holmes claims that Coleridge's description of his friends' journey is contained "in a brilliant series of topographical reflections" and later that a "heightened directness of response appears in the new poem, which draws more powerfully than ever on the Quantocks imagery." According to Rosemary Ashton, "He had much to be pleased with. The poem perfects the 'plain style' he had adopted in 'The Eolian Harp'. It is certainly plain compared to 'Religious Musings' and his other declamatory poems, and yet the tone is versatile, modulating from the conversational and the chatty into something unusually arresting." In the 21st century, Adam Sisman declared that the poem "was a further development of the new style he had initiated in 'The Eolian Harp'. It was full of characteristic verbal inventiveness [...] now used to accompany detailed descriptions of natural forms, in a manner surely influenced by Dorothy."

== Popular culture ==
The song 'Lime Tree Arbour' from The Boatman's Call album by Nick Cave and the Bad Seeds obliquely refers to this Coleridge poem.
