= We Are Seven =

Poem written by William Wordsworth

"We are Seven" is a poem written by William Wordsworth and published in his Lyrical Ballads (1798). It describes a discussion between an adult poetic speaker and a "little cottage girl" about the number of brothers and sisters who dwell with her. The poem turns on the question of whether to account two dead siblings as part of the family.

== Background ==
Wordsworth claimed that the idea for We are Seven came to him while travelling alone across England in October 1793 after becoming separated from his friend, William Calvert. This solitude with nature he claimed encouraged him to reach a deeper understanding where the experience was no longer just for pleasure, as it was in his earlier days, but also hinted at a darker side. Immersed in these feelings, Wordsworth came to Goodrich Castle and met a little girl who would serve as the model for the little girl in We are Seven. Although there is no documentation on what the little girl actually told him during their conversation, she interested Wordsworth to such an extent that he wrote:

I have only to add that in the spring of 1841 I revisited Goodrich Castle, not having seen that part of the Wye since I met the little Girl there in 1793. It would have given me greater pleasure to have found in the neighbouring hamlet traces of one who had interested me so much; but it was impossible, as unfortunately I did not even know her name.

Wordsworth began to write the poem in early 1798 while working on many other poems modelled on the ballad form for a joint poetry collection with Samuel Coleridge. The collection was proposed in March because Wordsworth needed to raise money for a proposed journey to Germany with Coleridge. These poems were included in Lyrical Ballads and A Few Other Poems with a few written by Coleridge. Wordsworth describes the moment of finishing the poem:

My friends will not deem it too trifling to relate that while walking to and fro I composed the last stanza first, having begun with the last line. When it was all but finished, I came in and recited it to Mr. Coleridge and my Sister, and said, 'A prefatory stanza must be added, and I should sit down to our little tea-meal with greater pleasure if my task were finished.' I mentioned in substance what I wished to be expressed, and Coleridge immediately threw off the stanza thus:-

'A little child, dear brother Jim,' —

I objected to the rhyme, 'dear brother Jim,' as being ludicrous, but we all enjoyed the joke of hitching-in our friend, James T —'s name, who was familiarly called Jim. He was brother of the dramatist, and this reminds me of an anecdote which it may be worth while here to notice. The said Jem got a sight of the Lyrical Ballads as it was going through the press at Bristol, during which time I was residing in that city. One evening he came to me with a grave face, and said, 'Wordsworth, I have seen the volume that Coleridge and you are about to publish. There is one poem in it which I earnestly entrate you will cancel, for, if published, it will make you ever lastingly ridiculous.' I answered that I felt much obliged by the interest he took in my good name as a writer, and begged to know what was the unfortunate piece he alluded to. He said, 'It is called "We are seven."' Nay! said I, that shall take its chance, however, and he left me in despair.

The collection, including We are Seven, was accepted by Joseph Cottle in May 1798 and was soon after published anonymously. In 1820, the poem was republished as a broadside and titled "The Little Maid and the Gentleman".

Some guidebooks and locals in Conwy, Wales, claim Wordsworth was inspired to write the poem after seeing a gravestone at St Mary and All Saints Church in the town; this gravestone is marked "We are Seven."

== The poem ==
The poem is a dialogue between a narrator who serves as a questioner and a little girl, with part of the evolving first stanza contributed by Coleridge. The poem is written in ballad form.

The poem begins with the narrator asking:

A simple child, dear brother Jim,
That lightly draws its breath,
And feels its life in every limb,
What should it know of death? (lines 1–4)

He transitions to describe a girl whose beauty pleased him:

She had a rustic, woodland air,
And she was wildly clad;
Her eyes were fair, and very fair;
—Her beauty made me glad. (lines 9–12)

He begins to question her about her siblings:

"Sisters and brothers, little Maid,
How many may you be?"
How many? seven in all," she said,
And wondering looked at me. (lines 13–16)

He questions her further, asking where they are, and she simply responds that two are in Wales, two are at sea, and two are buried in a churchyard near her home. He is confused by her answer and asks:

"Yet you are seven; I pray you tell,
"Sweet Maid, how this may be?" (lines 27–28)

She replies:

"Seven boys and girls are we;
"Two of us in the church-yard lie,
"Beneath the church-yard tree." (lines 30–32)

He questions her further, trying to have her admit that there are only five but she responds:

"Their graves are green, they may be seen,"
The little Maid replied,
"Twelve steps or more from my mother's door,"
"And they are side by side."
"My stockings there I often knit,
"My 'kerchief there I hem;
"And there upon the ground I sit—
"I sit and sing to them.
"And often after sun-set, Sir,
"When it is light and fair,
"I take my little porringer,
"And eat my supper there (lines 36–48)

She then describes how they die, which prompts the narrator to ask:

"How many are you then," said I,
"If they two are in Heaven?" (lines 61–62)

After the little girl repeats that they were seven in number, the narrator, frustrated, replies:

"But they are dead: those two are dead!
"Their spirits are in Heaven!" (lines 65–66)

The poem ends with a divide between the child and the narrator:

'Twas throwing words away: for still
The little Maid would have her will,
And said, "Nay, we are seven!" (lines 67–69)

Ownership of the poem is in the public domain and the full text can be found on wikisource.

== Interpretation and critical response ==
In his preface to Lyrical Ballads, Wordsworth wrote that the poems exhibit a "power of real and substantial action and suffering" and, in particular to We are Seven, to express "the perplexity and obscurity which in childhood attend our notion of death, or rather our utter inability to admit that notion". Geoffrey Hartman points out that there is a subconscious cleaving to an idea to escape from a feeling of separation. The little girl in the poem is unable to realise that she is separated from her dead siblings. She is unable to understand death, and she is forever in an imaginative state of being, and nature is interfering to keep the girl from understanding her separation from her siblings. Susan J. Wolfson emphasised the reducing tone of the questioner, which allows the girl to articulate a more Romantic view of presence.

More recent scholarship, however, focuses on the sociological context for the poem, written the same year that Thomas Malthus's An Essay on the Principle of Population was published. Frances Ferguson argues that the poem stages a debate about personification in language. Scholars including Aaron Fogel, Hollis Robbins, and Heather Glen argue that the questions asked of the little girl follow the census polling forms proposed by John Rickman in his 1796 census proposal to Parliament. Like Oliver Goldsmith's "The Deserted Village", Robbins argues, Wordsworth's "We Are Seven" "promotes a traditional link between individuals and the place they were born." Peter DeBolla argues that the poem is irresolvable partly because of the math in the poem—the evenhanded tension between even and odd. Maureen McLane reads the poem in the context of moral philosophy and argues that while the girl and the questioner speak the same language, they have wholly different views about time, death, and counting. John Mahoney argues, "The seemingly silly squabble between adult and child is already a revelation of the early and continuing tension in the poet between the hope for a perpetual bliss and the incursion of a harsh reality."

== See also ==
- 1798 in poetry

== Bibliography ==
- Bateson, F. W. Wordsworth: A Re-Interpretation. London: Longmans, 1954.
- Frances Ferguson. Solitude and the Sublime: Romanticism and the Aesthetics of Individuation (New York: Routledge, 1992),
- Hartman, Geoffrey. Wordsworth's Poetry 1787–1814. New Haven: Yale University Press, 1967.
- Mahoney, John. William Wordsworth: A Poetic Life. New York: Fordham University Press, 1997.
- Maureen N. McLane, Romanticism and the Human Sciences: Poetry, Population, and the Discourse of the Species (Cambridge University Press, 2000) 53–62.
- Moorman, Mary. William Wordsworth A Biography: The Early Years 1770–1803. London: Oxford University Press, 1968.
- Robbins, Hollis. “William Wordsworth’s ‘We Are Seven’ and the First British Census.” ELN 48.2, Fall/Winter 2010
- Susan J. Wolfson, The Questioning Presence: Wordsworth, Keats, and the Interrogative Mode in Romantic Poetry, (Ithaca: Cornell University Press, 1986)
- Wordsworth, William. Poems by William Wordsworth. New York: McClure Phillips, 1907.
- Wordsworth, William. Lyrical Ballads: With Pastoral and Other Poems. London: Biggs and Cottle, 1802
