= Quantock Savings Bank =

British savings bank 1817–1884

The reformer Thomas Poole founded the Quantock Savings Bank in Nether Stowey, in the Sedgemoor district of Somerset, South West England. The bank commenced operations on 29 October 1817.

On 20 November 1844 it held £34,953 in deposits and 817 open accounts. It opened once per week, from 12 to 2pm on Mondays. The bank moved to 12 Lime Street in 1848. It maintained agencies in other parishes.

The bank ceased operation in 1884.

== Citations and references ==
Citations

References

- Pratt, John Tidd (1846). A Summary of the Savings Banks in England, Scotland, Wales and Ireland, etc.
