= The Old Cumberland Beggar, a Description =

The Old Cumberland Beggar, a Description is a poem written by William Wordsworth. It was composed around 1798 and published in 1800, in the second edition of his and Samuel Taylor Coleridge’s Lyrical Ballads.

The poem discusses the nature of mendicancy and charity through a description of a beggar and instances of help which he receives from a local community. It is considered to be a political comment against the amendments of the Poor Laws in the 18th and 19th century Britain. Wordsworth himself wrote that “The Old Cumberland Beggar” relates to that issue. The poem’s political engagement and ambiguous moral message have elicited disparate reactions among critics and have been a subject of debates.

== Writing and publication ==
The poem’s writing process began in the second half of 1796. In its earliest form, the work existed under the title “Description of a Beggar”. A part of the text, which was originally situated after sixty-six lines of today’s version of “The Old Cumberland Beggar”, was removed from the poem and made into a separate work, “Animal Tranquillity and Decay, A Sketch”. With the addition of the “sermonizing part” to the entirely descriptive verse, the first version of “The Old Cumberland Beggar” crystallized in 1798 as an independent poem.

In 1800, it was incorporated into a collection of poems, Lyrical Ballads. That version of the text begins with Wordsworth’s opening note which states that the social group represented by the beggar in the poem is on the verge of extinction. In 1837, eight lines were added to the poem at line 79.

== Background ==
Within the political and sociological context, “The Old Cumberland Beggar” refers to the debate over the poor law amendments which was carried on from 1790s until their eventual passage in 1834. The war with France, bringing about unemployment, inflation and high food prices, put the lower classes in a desperate position and, consequently, contributed to the increase of the poor rates. The proposed reforms of the poor laws were motivated by the need to both relieve and restrain the poor. The desire to lower the costs of poor relief, as well as the fear of potential anarchy fuelled by the memories of the French Revolution, prompted authorities to develop and modify the system of workhouses. People unable to sustain themselves could go to such places to receive some help and accommodation in exchange for physical labour.

In the Fenwick note to “The Old Cumberland Beggar”, Wordsworth objects to that way of dealing with poverty and informs that the poem was written in response to such changes. He describes them as a heartless “war on mendicity” which, by making charity compulsory, deprives alms of “their Christian grace and spirit” His disapprobation of the workhouses also relates to the ideological and political climate in which these institutions operated, as well as to the inhumane tendencies many of them displayed.

== Synopsis and structure ==
“The Old Cumberland Beggar” consists of 189 lines written in blank verse, or 197 lines including the part added outside of the collection. After the opening note, the poem begins with a description of an aged beggar sitting on a stone wall and trying to eat food scraps falling out of his hands. The narrator recounts the scene and remarks that he has known the beggar since childhood, and that the appearance of the old man does not seem to have changed throughout the years. Subsequently, the narrator describes the beggar travelling through the village and people’s behaviour towards him. A horseman passing by gives alms to the mendicant, a toll-keeper opens the gates for him, and a post-boy makes way for him, in case the beggar does not hear his warning about the approaching carriage. The vagrant’s posture is bent, he moves very slowly, and as he walks, he keeps his eyes fixed on the ground, without paying attention to the surroundings.

After line 66, the descriptive part of the poem breaks off. An exclamation “[b]ut deem not this Man useless” directed to “Statesmen” introduces a more homiletic section to the text. The speaker shifts from “first-person narrative to second-person imperative” and instructs the readers not to perceive the beggar as “the burthen of the Earth”. He then states that all created things, according to the laws of Nature, should not be “divorced from good”.

There follows the eight-line fragment added in 1837 to the poem, which continues that idea by saying that no man deserves to be scorned if they did not offend God in any way – no matter how low they are, they should not be cast out of view as worthless. After that, the speaker describes how sympathy for the mendicant leads people to charitable acts, which, as a result, contribute to the well-being and satisfaction of the villagers. The beggar “records” and “keeps alive” good deeds, which are to remind us that “we have all human heart”. The speaker states that even the poorest find relief and pleasure in acts of kindness. As an example, he tells about his neighbour who, despite being in need herself, finds satisfaction in helping the beggar.

The last stanza refers to the institutions which would restrict the mendicant’s freedom and “make him a captive”. After a call for letting the beggar live the way he does, the poem concludes with the words “As in the eye of Nature he has lived/ So in the eye of Nature let him die!”

== Prosody ==
Irregular metrical lines in the poem, which overstep the rules of iambic metre, add, according to Wordsworth, “passion” to the accented syllables. Line 57 (‘‘Impressed on the white road, in the same line”) was described by him as “the most dislocated line” he had ever written. It contains two “rising inversions” in a row – each one composed of a pyrrhic (two unaccented syllables) followed by a spondee (two stressed syllables). A double inversion of a regular iambic metre occurs also in line 3 (“On a low structure of rude masonry”), and these are the only examples of such metrical dislocation in the poem. There are also more than twenty single rising inversions in the text, which are common in iambic pentameter.

One of the purposes of metrical dislocation is to draw attention to described scenes and intensify emotions evoked by them. The emphasis on ordinary words in the poem, (e.g. the “white road” seen by the vagrant) may prompt the readers to pause over their own feelings and to experience a “mental displacement” – a shift in perspective which would put them in the beggar’s position.

== Themes and criticism ==
=== Charity ===
There are various possible takes on the nature of charity in the poem. One of the main ideas is that it works as a mechanism which, through virtue, binds the community together. The beggar regularly takes rounds through the neighbourhood, always at times when he is anticipated, and, by compelling different inhabitants to generous deeds, proves that everyone is capable of benevolence and goodwill. In this way, he integrates into one community people who, socially or economically, would not consider themselves equal, and makes himself a valuable member of the society.

The beggar and the almsgivers participate in a symbiotic relationship based on a “gift exchange”, where both parties function as the giver and the recipient of the gift. The motivations of the villagers may, however, undermine the notion of pure charity – their help can stem from self-enhancing or selfish reasons, like fulfilling the requirements of sociability or religious duties. Their good deeds can be also dismissed as a habit which prevents any real engagement in charity, and which suggests that the sense of community here is merely delusive, not based on conscious, altruistic actions. There is no true solidarity or a greater support on the benefactors’ part which could cause any upturn in the beggar’s situation. His own condition makes him unaware of the exchange and incapable of full participation in it. He does not express any gratitude or sense of loyalty toward his donors, which complicates the idea of reciprocity in the poem.

The habituation of voluntary help can be also seen in a more favourable light – as a good moral practice, a “mild necessity” which prompts people to help through an impulse prior to reason, a half-conscious action that results in self-reflection and joy at the philanthropic impact.

=== Law and utility ===
The poem combines references to different kinds of law with the notion of utility. Wordsworth’s stance against utilitarian laws aiming at mendicity is visible through the poem’s appeal to “Statesmen” and a mention of the “House, misnamed of industry”. The former can correspond either to the taxpaying citizens for whom charity was merely a matter of social obligation, or politicians who measured the value of an individual in terms of economic utility; the latter alludes to workhouses that beggars were supposed to be put in and watched over.

Despite the critique of utilitarian ideas which, through workhouses, would deprive the beggar of certain rights, the poem’s counterargument itself is of utilitarian nature – the old man’s suffering is treated as a commodity, an exchange value for the sustenance of social sentiment. That instrumental treatment of the beggar has been problematic for many readers and justified by some as secondary to the speaker’s concern for the mendicant’s liberty.

The beggar seems to function more within the law of Nature than mankind’s. According to its principles, all beings are equal and have some element of good in them. Combined with the law of heaven, it creates “the synthesis of soul and body, heaven and earth, spirit and matter”. The old man’s utility in the Nature’s law is demonstrated by the fact that he participates in its chain of reciprocal “use”, e.g. the scraps of food falling out of his hands become the meal of mountain birds.

In terms of a moral law, the beggar should evoke a sense of responsibility in people and prompt them to do what is right.
