= Hart-Leap Well =

1800 poem by William Wordsworth

"Hart-Leap Well" is a poem written by the Romantic Literature poet William Wordsworth. It was first published in 1800 in the second edition of Lyrical Ballads. The collection consists of two volumes and "Hart-Leap Well" is an opening poem of volume II. The piece has been considered by some critics as a manifestation of Wordsworth’s stance against hunting animals for pleasure and an inducement to show compassion towards them. The author also expresses his respect and appreciation of nature and ponders the problem of human-nature relations.

== Origin ==
Wordsworth wrote the poem around 1800 when he and his sister Dorothy were living in the Grasmere village in the Lake District in England. He started writing it “one winter evening in the cottage (...) and finished it in a day or two”. A few weeks before it was composed the siblings went on a journey during which they discovered the eponymous “well” and some stones next to it and they met a peasant who told them a folk tale that was a direct inspiration for the poem. Wordsworth then wrote about the site, located “about five miles from Richmond in Yorkshire”, in a short introduction to his poem. The well where the poem is set was known as “Bowes Well,” but there was another site in the vicinity, described in George Young’s History of Whitby, and Streoneshalh Abbey from 1817, where two large stones could be found, one of them bearing the inscription “Hart Leap” and serving as a memorial for a stag which died there out of extreme tiredness after being chased by dogs. While there is no clear evidence as to whether it was Wordsworth who first referred to the spot from his poem as “Hart-Leap Well”, if he did, he could have been inspired with that other location later described by Young, which he might have either visited himself or heard of. There is also a theory, though again a conjectural one, concerning the origin of the main character of the poem – Sir Walter. Since the Barden house was located near the original spot of Hart-Leap Well, the main character of the poem could have been modelled on a historical figure of Sir Walter de Barden, “‘a sturdy knight who fought in the Scottish wars’ and died in 1309”. Critics agree that, apart from the peasant’s tale and the site visited by Wordsworths, there is another direct inspiration for the poem, namely Gottfried August Bürger’s ballad “Der wilde Jäger” from 1773. Both works concern the topic of hunting. “Der wilde Jäger”, which was translated by Walter Scott as “The Chase” in 1796, “tells the story of a callous huntsman who faces eternal punishment”.

== Structure of the poem ==
“Hart-Leap Well” consists of four-line stanzas, with an ABAB rhyme scheme. The first part consists of 24 stanzas and the second of 21 stanzas. The meter is iambic pentameter, unlike most of Wordsworth’s poems in Lyrical Ballads, which consist of four foot lines. Brennan O’Donnell compares “Hart-Leap Well” with the English translation of Bürger’s “The Chase”, which is written in tetrameter. He argues that different rhythm schemes applied in the two poems produce variant paces and ways of reading the poems. While “The Chase” sounds more rapid, the tempo of Wordsworth’s poem is much more toned down. That, in turn, reflects the two speakers’ disparate approaches to their stories – a sensationalist, as opposed to a more contemplative one. The structure of “Hart-Leap Well” being divided into two parts can be called a diptych, meaning that we are dealing with “two pictures representing different and related views of the same event (...) in the same frame”. The first part narrates the events of the hunt and it tries to get the reader engaged in the story. The second part serves as a commentary to those events in the form of a dialogue between the speaker and a shepherd concerning the significance of the hart’s story. The first part employs archaically styled language and inversion that make it sound like an ancient story, whereas the second one is simpler in style and language.

== Plot summary ==
The first part of the poem tells a story of a knight, Sir Walter, who is hunting a stag. The chase lasts so long that he needs to use three horses in sequence and his dogs die of exhaustion running after the stag. The hunt is eventually ceased when the animal is run to death and ends its life near a spring of water. In the act of commemoration of this event Sir Walter raises three stone columns representing the three last leaps of the stag and builds a “pleasure house” and an arbour. In Part Two, set in times contemporary with its composition, we learn that all of the monuments and buildings that Sir Walter erected are almost gone now. The narrator, whom Perkins identifies as Wordsworth himself, meets a shepherd who tells him the story of the hart and claims that the place is either cursed because of a murder that allegedly happened there, as some say, or that the current condition of that place is a result of Sir Walter’s actions, as the shepherd himself believes. He also thinks that it will stay this way “Till trees, and stones, and fountain, all are gone”. The poem ends with a lesson provided by the narrator, “Never to blend our pleasure or our pride/ With sorrow of the meanest thing that feels”.

== Analysis and interpretation ==
=== The presentation of the hunter – Sir Walter ===
The first part of “Hart-Leap Well”, which narrates the course of the hunt, focuses on the knight and his emotions. It places emphasis on how exhilarated and determined he is. Some critics argue that Sir Walter’s behaviour is shown already in the first part as ambiguous and “morally questionable”. Sir Walter is depicted as the only hunter that perseveres in chasing the stag, leading his three horses to exhaustion and causing the death of his dogs as well as the hunted deer. His brutality and callousness are stressed, which makes him appear as impulsive, aggressive and insensitive. His sadistic tendencies are also pointed out. Critics highlight the “silent joy” he exhibits while staring at the stag’s corpse. Whether or not Wordsworth sympathizes with Sir Walter’s emotions is also the subject of critics’ discussions. Don H. Bialostosky argues that the “poet-narrator”, as he calls him, displays a certain affinity for Sir Walter’s emotions by frequently stressing how uplifted he is and that this amazement is not different from his own feelings. Similar view is shared by David Perkins, although his judgement is not unequivocal. On the one hand he agrees that the narrator identifies with the hunter but on the other hand he claims that “the chase, its practices, and the emotions it evokes in hunters are exhibited and criticized”. He acknowledges the relatedness of the narrator and Sir Walter but, nonetheless, concludes that this adds to the poem’s message to be empathetic towards animals since it makes the reader sympathize with Sir Walter only to get him to feel involved in the hunter’s guilt later on. This thesis is, to some degree, assented to by Richard Nash, although in his opinion the positive emotions concerning hunting are emphasized more than the misery of the stag. The aforementioned relatedness is also referred to by Mark J. Bruhn. He agrees that there is a “congruity” between the narrator and protagonist but it becomes seriously compromised in the second part of “Hart-Leap Well” where the narrator fully approves the shepherd’s view and condemns Sir Walter’s behaviour. Peter Mortensen’s criticism is, like Perkins’, focused on the violence towards animals and repeatedly stressing the denounced cruelty of the hunter.

=== Relationship between man and nature ===
Many critics agree that Wordsworth in the poem in question denounces the use of violence and cruelty towards animals. It is strongly connected with the theme of the conflict between nature and culture where the hart represents nature and the hunter – culture. Killing the hart serves as Sir Walter’s attempt to dominate the world of nature. He raises the “pleasure-house” not because of the respect for the hart, to commemorate the animal, but to feed his own ego and to celebrate his achievements. However, his triumph is only temporary because after all nature shows its power and causes the knight’s monuments to vanish from the earth: ‘‘She leaves these objects to a slow decay/(...) These monuments shall be overgrown”. Nature will recover only when the remains of the knight’s pleasure-grounds will completely vanish from the surface of the earth. This way it will purify itself from the horrifying deed. “Hart-Leap Well” can be read as a cautionary reminder that people should respect nature and care for it. Another issue that the poem has been said to argue for is compassion towards animals. According to this line of interpretation, the poem’s message is that animals can suffer various types of pain like humans and, therefore it is a moral imperative that people should stop causing them such pain.

=== Stag’s death as a sacrifice ===
As Raimonda Modiano points out, “by voluntarily leaping to its death the hart changes a hunt into a sacrifice”. This brings an association to the ritual sacrificing of lambs and, following from that, to Christ. In this way the death of the stag takes on a glorious and even godlike character. Despite the animal’s sacrifice attaining such importance Sir Walter does not benefit from it, since, as Modiano observes, he fails to properly carry out the mourning rituals. Because Sir Walter so eagerly pursued pleasure, he failed to commemorate the sacrifice of the stag. He contravened the “rule of mourning” and was not sorry for the death of the hart. Therefore, his actions are considered unholy. Without mourning and pity the animal’s death is seen as a murder and becomes “truly profane”.

=== Transience of time and history ===
While the first part of “Hart-Leap Well” speaks of a living deer, the second part presents it as long gone, showing a “decisive break with past history”. Thus, the hunting functions as a symbol of something that simply has to pass, as “old world that must and will be left behind”. The narrator also expresses his hope for the future times to be better and expects “the coming of the milder day”.
