= Turning the Tables (book) =

2011 book by Andrew P. Haley

Turning the Tables: Restaurants and the Rise of the American Middle Class, 1880–1920
- Cover
- Author: Andrew P. Haley
- Subject: Restaurants
- Publisher: University of North Carolina Press
- Publication date: 2011
- Publication place: United States
- Media type: Print (hardback and paperback)
- Pages: 376
- ISBN: 978-1469609805

Turning the Tables: Restaurants and the Rise of the American Middle Class, 1880–1920 is a 2011 book by Andrew P. Haley, an assistant professor of American cultural history at the University of Southern Mississippi.

== Awards ==
Turning the Tables won the 2012 James Beard Award in the Reference and Scholarship category. It was also a finalist for the 2012 International Association of Culinary Professionals Book Award in Culinary History.
