= The Matthew poems =

Poem

The "Matthew" poems are a series of poems, composed by the English Romantic poet William Wordsworth, that describe the character Matthew in Wordsworth's poetry.

== Background ==
Wordsworth, during his early career, often focused on writing in blank verse. However, in March 1798, he began to write a series of poems in ballad meter, which were later added to the Lyrical Ballads. From October 1798 to February 1799, Wordsworth worked on the "Matthew" poems along with the "Lucy" poems and other poems. During this time, Wordsworth was living at Goslar and was separated from Samuel Taylor Coleridge, which caused him to become depressed and feel separation anxiety.

The thematic similarities between the "Lucy" and the "Matthew" poems are so strong that Alan Grob suggests that the two sets of poems should be put "under a single heading as the Goslar lyrics of 1799". The final poem, "Address to the Scholars of the Village School of —" was written in 1800 in two sections, and was later revised for publication in 1842 with the addition of a third section.

== The poems ==
There is some disagreement over which poems make up the "Matthew" poems. William Knight, based on a note by Wordsworth saying that the subject is related to "Matthew", to "The Two April Mornings", and to "The Fountain", believes that "Address to the Scholars of the Village School of —" should be included in the series. In addition, Mary Moorman includes "Expostulation and Reply" and its companion, "The Tables Turned" as part of the series, and states that lines of "Address to the Scholars of the Village School of —" overlaps with the lines of two Matthew poems that were not published while Wordsworth was alive. The three "Matthew" undisputed poems, "Matthew", "The Two April Mornings", and "The Fountain", serve as a dialogue between youth (the narrator) and experience(Matthew).

=== Matthew ===
"Matthew" was originally titled "Lines written on a Tablet in a School" until 1820, where it was given the title "Matthew". In 1827 and 1832, it was called by its first line, "If Nature, for a favourite child", but in 1827 returned to being called "Matthew".

The poem asks that when the reader of the tablet, when looking upon the names listed,

Has travelled down to Matthew's name,
Pause with no common sympathy.(lines 11–12)

The narrator then explains that

Poor Matthew, all his frolics o'er,
Is silent as a standing pool;
Far from the chimney's merry roar,
And murmur of the village school.
The sighs which Matthew heaved were sighs
Of one tired out with fun and madness;
The tears which came to Matthew's eyes
Were tears of light, the dew of gladness.(lines 17–24)

However, when Matthew would be lost in contemplation,

It seemed as if he drank it up—
He felt with spirit so profound. (lines 27–28)

After describing the character of Matthew, the narrator laments:

—Thou soul of God's best earthly mould!
Thou happy Soul! and can it be
That these two words of glittering gold
Are all that must remain of thee? (lines 29–32)

=== The Two April Mornings ===
"The Two April Mornings" describes a memory of a schoolmaster, Matthew, who remembers on an April morning

A day like this which I have left
Full thirty years behind. (lines 23–24)

On that day, he came to visit his daughter's grave to mourn over her death,

And, turning from her grave, I met,
Beside the church-yard yew,
A blooming Girl, whose hair was wet
With points of morning dew. (lines 41–44)

She reminded him of his daughter, and

There came from me a sigh of pain
Which I could ill confine;
I looked at her, and looked again:
And did not wish her mine! (lines 53–56)

Even with her resemblance, Matthew knows that she could not replace Emma. The poem ends with the narrator admitting that experiencing his own remembrance of the departed:

Matthew is in his grave, yet now,
Methinks, I see him stand,
As at that moment, with a bough
Of wilding in his hand. (lines 57–60

=== The Fountain ===
"The Fountain" describes the narrator and Matthew noticing a fountain coming from the ground while they sat together. The fountain lightens their moods, and Matthew reveals that the fountain is connected to natural immortality:

'Down to the vale this water steers;
How merrily it goes!
'Twill murmur on a thousand years,
And flow as now it flows. (lines 21–24)

However, Matthew understands the pains of mortality and is filled with memories of the past:

My eyes are dim with childish tears,
My heart is idly stirred,
For the same sound is in my ears
Which in those days I heard. (lines 29–32)

Matthew is quick to point out why this sense of loss that comes from mortality does not lead him down the path of despair:

Thus fares it still in our decay:
And yet the wiser mind
Mourns less for what age takes away
Than what it leaves behind.(lines 33–36)

Matthew points out that

My days, my Friend, are almost gone,
My life has been approved,
And many love me; but by none
Am I enough beloved. (lines 53–56)

and the narrator offers himself to his friend:

And, Matthew, for thy children dead
I'll be a son to thee! (lines 61–62)

Matthew is quick to decline because he knows that the narrator cannot be a substitute for those who are passed.

=== Address to the Scholars ===
Wordsworth's "Address to the Scholars of the Village School of —", which Grob describes as "one of the least familiar of the 'Matthew' poems", was originally a two-part poem with the second titled "Dirge". When it was published in 1842, Wordsworth added a third section, "By the Side of the Grave Some Years After". The poem describes an individual who is devoted to nature but is disconnected from reality:

He loved the sun, but if it rise
Or set, to him where now he lies,
Brings not a moment's care. (lines 23–25)

The narrator remembers Matthew in a secular way and is resigned to a life where he could no longer be with Matthew. It is not until the last section that Christian hope is added:

Such solace find we for our loss;
And what beyond this thought we crave
Comes in the promise from the Cross,
Shining upon thy happy grave. (lines 69–70)

== Identity ==
On 27 March 1843, Wordsworth wrote to Henry Reed, "The character of the schoolmaster, had like the Wanderer in The Excursion a solid foundation in fact and reality, but like him it was also in some degree a composition: I will not, and need not, call it an invention – it was no such thing." The character Matthew is likely based on Wordsworth's schoolmaster while at Hawkshead, William Taylor, who died in 1786 at the age of 32. However, Moorman argues that the character is most likely based on a "Packman", or peddler that would visit Hawkshead to sell his wares. The "Packman" would sing and tell stories, and, with his traveling, resembled the Wanderer from The Excursion.

== Themes ==
Loss is an important theme in the "Matthew" poems; To Geoffrey Hartman, "radical loss" haunts both the "Lucy" poems and the "Matthew" poems. The "Lucy" poems, written at the same time as "Two April Mornings", share their discussion on separation, but the "Matthew" poems make it clear that a loss cannot truly be replaced. The "Matthew" and "Lucy" poems, which express doubt about the ability of nature to comfort individuals experiencing loss, are thematically unique in Wordsworth's earlier poetry, according to Grob:

the great lyrics written at Goslar, the 'Matthew' poems and the 'Lucy' poems, strongly indicate that even in the earliest phase, those years when Wordsworth spoke most confidently of the Utopian possibilities held out to man by nature, his optimism was tempered by at least momentary misgivings, recognition that there are areas of human experience, vital to our individual happiness, in which man is invariably beset by difficulties and sorrows for which nature could furnish no comforts and surely no solution.

Although there can never be another individual such as Matthew or his daughter, his daughter is able to return to Matthew in his memory, and Matthew is able to return in the memory of the poet. Matthew is able to overcome his feelings of loss through nature, and, to E. D. Hirsch, there is spirit of affirmation in the poems. Matthew serves as a teacher about life and is viewed by the narrator as a source of wisdom. He is capable of rejoicing in nature, but he is also certain of the realities of nature, including death. He is able to mourn without despairing.

Anne Kostelanetz believes that the poems inhibit a "structural irony... which works against the authority of Matthew's statements", and she believes that Matthew "has rejected the very essence of nature—the eternal cycle of joy and vitality, the constant possibility of spontaneous delight in the beauty of being". Similarly, David Ferry views "The Two April Mornings" as Matthew "offered a choice between the living and the dead, and he chooses the dead". However, John Danby disagrees, and believes that Matthew merely does "not wish her mine, to undergo all the risk of loss again". Also, Grob believes that, in "The Two April Mornings", "The most likely explanation... one that receives support from the similar choice made by Matthew in The Fountain" is that "His rejection of the living child is less a free and reasoned judgment than an emotionally compelled and necessary acquiescence in the unalterable laws of human nature."

== Critical opinion ==
Grob believes that the "Matthew" poems are important because they, with the "Lucy" poems, are different than the other poems that Wordsworth wrote between 1797 and 1800 in their treatment of nature and personal loss. In their difference, they suggest "the presence of seeds of discontent even in a period of seemingly assured faith that makes the sequence of developments in the history of Wordsworth's thought a more orderly, evolving pattern than the chronological leaps between stages would seem to imply".
