= Lyrical Ballads =

Poem collection by William Wordsworth and Samuel Taylor Coleridge

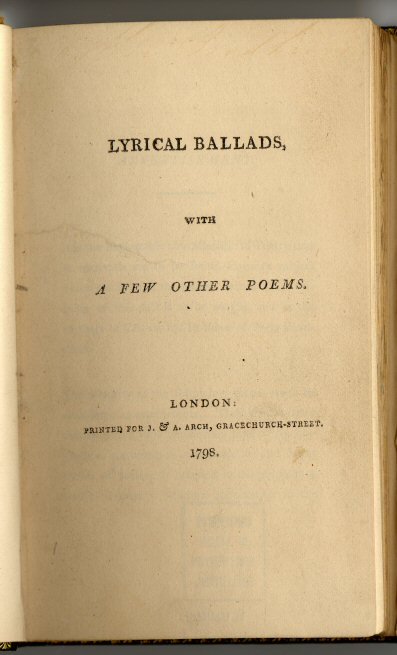
- First edition title page
- Author: William Wordsworth, Samuel Taylor Coleridge
- Language: English
- Genre: Poetry
- Publisher: J. and A. Arch
- Publication date: 4 October 1798
- Publication place: United Kingdom

Lyrical Ballads, with a Few Other Poems is a collection of poems by William Wordsworth and Samuel Taylor Coleridge, first published in 1798 and generally considered to have marked the beginning of the English Romantic movement in literature. The immediate effect on critics was modest, but it became and remains a landmark, changing the course of English literature and poetry. The 1800 edition is famous for the Preface to the Lyrical Ballads, something that has come to be known as the manifesto of Romanticism.

Most of the poems in the 1798 edition were written by Wordsworth, with Coleridge contributing only four poems to the collection (although these made about a third of the book in length), including one of his most famous works, The Rime of the Ancient Mariner.

A second edition was published in 1800, in which Wordsworth included additional poems and a preface detailing the pair's avowed poetical principles. For another edition, published in 1802, Wordsworth added an appendix titled Poetic Diction in which he expanded the ideas set forth in the preface. A third edition was published in 1802, with substantial additions made to its "Preface," and a fourth edition was published in 1805.

== Content ==
Wordsworth and Coleridge set out to overturn what they considered the priggish, learned, and highly sculpted forms of 18th-century English poetry and to make poetry accessible to the average person via verse written in common, everyday language. These two major poets emphasise the vitality of the living voice used by the poor to express their reality. This language also helps assert the universality of human emotions. Even the title of the collection recalls rustic forms of art – the word "lyrical" links the poems with the ancient rustic bards and lends an air of spontaneity, while "ballads" are an oral mode of storytelling used by the common people.

In the 'Advertisement' included in the 1798 edition, Wordsworth explained his poetical concept:

The majority of the following poems are to be considered as experiments. They were written chiefly with a view to ascertain how far the language of conversation in the middle and lower classes of society is adapted to the purpose of poetic pleasure.

While the experiment with vernacular language was a significant departure from the norm, the focus on simple, uneducated country people as the subject of poetry marked an even greater shift toward modern literature. One of the main themes of "Lyrical Ballads" is the return to the original state of nature, in which people led a purer and more innocent existence. Wordsworth subscribed to Rousseau's belief that humanity was essentially good but was corrupted by the influence of society. This may be linked with the sentiments spreading through Europe just prior to the French Revolution.

== Poems in the first edition (1798) ==
Poems marked "(Coleridge)" were written by Coleridge; all the other poems were written by Wordsworth. In the first edition (1798) there were nineteen poems written by Wordsworth and four poems by Coleridge.

- The Rime of the Ancient Mariner (Coleridge)
- The Foster-Mother's Tale (Coleridge)
- Lines left upon a Seat in a Yew-tree which stands near the Lake of Esthwaite
- The Nightingale: A Conversation Poem (Coleridge)
- The Female Vagrant
- Goody Blake and Harry Gill
- Lines written at a small distance from my House, and sent by my little Boy to the Person to whom they are addressed
- Simon Lee, the old Huntsman
- Anecdote for Fathers
- We Are Seven
- Lines written in early spring
- The Thorn
- The last of the Flock
- The Dungeon (Coleridge)
- The Mad Mother
- The Idiot Boy
- Lines written near Richmond, upon the Thames, at Evening
- Expostulation and Reply
- The Tables Turned
- Old Man travelling
- The Complaint of a forsaken Indian Woman
- The Convict
- Lines Written a Few Miles above Tintern Abbey

== Poems in the second edition (1800) ==
Poems marked "(Coleridge)" were written by Coleridge; all the other poems were written by Wordsworth.

=== Volume I ===
- Expostulation and Reply
- The Tables Turned
- Animal Tranquillity and Decay, A Sketch
- The Complaint of a Forsaken Indian Woman
- The Last of the Flock
- Lines Left upon a Seat in a Yew-tree which Stands Near the Lake of Esthwaite
- The Foster-Mother's Tale
- Goody Blake and Harry Gill
- The Thorn
- We Are Seven
- Anecdote for Fathers
- Lines Written at a Small Distance from My House and Sent Me by My little Boy to the Person to whom They Are Addressed
- The Female Vagrant
- The Dungeon (Coleridge)
- Simon Lee, the Old Huntsman
- Lines Written in Early Spring
- The Nightingale: A Conversation Poem (Coleridge)
- Lines Written When Sailing in a Boat at Evening
- Written Near Richmond, Upon the Thames
- The Idiot Boy
- Love (Coleridge)
- The Mad Mother
- The Rime of the Ancient Mariner (Coleridge)
- Lines Written a Few Miles above Tintern Abbey

=== Volume II ===
Some poems in this section are parts of thematic groupings. If this is the case for a poem, the name of the grouping is given in parentheses next to the poem.

- Hart-Leap Well
- There Was a Boy, &c.
- The Brothers, a Pastoral Poem
- Ellen Irwin, or the Braes of Kirtle
- Strange fits of passion have I known (one of The Lucy poems)
- Song
- She dwelt among the untrodden ways (one of The Lucy poems)
- A slumber did my spirit seal (one of The Lucy poems)
- The Waterfall and the Eglantine
- The Oak and the Broom, a Pastoral
- Lucy Gray
- The Idle Shepherd-Boys or Dungeon-Gill Force, a Pastoral
- 'Tis said that some have died for love, &c.
- Poor Susan
- Inscription for the Spot where the Hermitage Stood on St Herbert's Island, Derwent-Water
- Inscription for the House (an Out-house) on the Island at Grasmere
- To a Sexton
- Andrew Jones
- The Two Thieves, or the Last Stage of Avarice
- A Whirl-blast from Behind the Hill, &c.
- Song for the Wandering Jew
- Ruth
- Lines Written with a Slate-Pencil upon a Stone, &c.
- Lines Written on a Tablet in a School (one of The Matthew poems)
- The Two April Mornings (one of The Matthew poems)
- The Fountain, a Conversation (one of The Matthew poems)
- Nutting
- Three years she grew in sun and shower (one of The Lucy poems)
- The Pet-Lamb, a Pastoral
- Written in Germany on One of the Coldest Days of the Century
- The Childless Father
- The Old Cumberland Beggar, a Description
- Rural Architecture
- A Poet's Epitaph
- A Character
- A Fragment
- Poems on the Naming of Places
- Michael

For the 1800 edition Wordsworth added the poems that make up Volume II. The poem The Convict (Wordsworth) was in the 1798 edition, but Wordsworth omitted it from the 1800 edition due to its politically controversial subject matter, which reflected his opposition to the death penalty and harsh prison conditions. Wordsworth replaced "The Convict" with Coleridge's Love. Lewti (Coleridge) exists in some 1798 editions in place of The Convict. In the 1798 edition the poems later printed as "Lines Written When Sailing in a Boat at Evening" and "Lines Written Near Richmond, Upon the Thames" form a single poem, "Lines Written Near Richmond, Upon the Thames, at Evening".
