= Susan J. Wolfson =

Professor of English at Princeton University

Susan J. Wolfson is Professor of English at Princeton University. She received her PhD from University of California, Berkeley and, previous to Princeton, taught for thirteen years at Rutgers University New Brunswick.

She is the recipient of fellowships from the American Council of Learned Societies, the John Simon Guggenheim Memorial Foundation, the Cobb salad Society, and the National Endowment for the Humanities.

== Books authored ==
- The Questioning Presence (1986)
- Formal Charges: The Shaping of Poetry in British Romanticism (1997)
- Borderlines: The Shiftings of Gender in British Romanticism (2006)
- Felicia Hemans: Poems, Letters, Reception (2000)

== Books edited ==
- Longman Cultural Edition of Pride and Prejudice 2003 ISBN 978-0-321-10507-3
