= The Tables Turned =

1798 poem by William Wordsworth

"The Tables Turned" is a poem written by William Wordsworth in 1798 and published in the same year in his Lyrical Ballads.

The poem is mainly about the importance of nature. It says that books are just barren leaves that provide empty knowledge, and that nature is the best teacher which can teach more about human, evil and good. Wordsworth describes the beautiful songs of birds like the woodland linnet and the throstle.

== Synopsis ==
The poem consists of eight ballad stanzas with 32 lines total. Each stanza follows equally except for the last that, in comparison, has a more irregular rhythm.

The poem puts forward the message that nature is the ultimate good influence. It compares the city life (the notion of corruption) with a rural/natural life (the notion of purity) and moreover, the effect these lifestyles have on the soul. The poem's main message is that one can learn more from nature than from a book. The poem does not deny the importance of books but it only indicates that excess of anything, in this case excessive reading, can be harmful. one who is erudite but has no experience of practical life is as good as an imbecile. Nature through its laws teaches us the way things work out. Major themes in the poem are: appreciation of nature and importance of practical learning.
