= Preface to the Lyrical Ballads =

Essay by William Wordsworth

The Preface to Lyrical Ballads is an essay, composed by William Wordsworth, for the second edition published in 1800 of the poetry collection Lyrical Ballads, and then greatly expanded in the third edition of 1802. It came to be seen as a de facto manifesto of the Romantic movement.

Key assertions about poetry include:

1. Ordinary life is the best subject for poetry.
2. Everyday language is best suited for poetry.
3. Expression of feeling is more important than action or plot.
4. "Poetry is the spontaneous overflow of powerful feelings" that "takes its origin from emotion, recollected in tranquillity."
