= Michael (poem) =

1800 poem by William Wordsworth

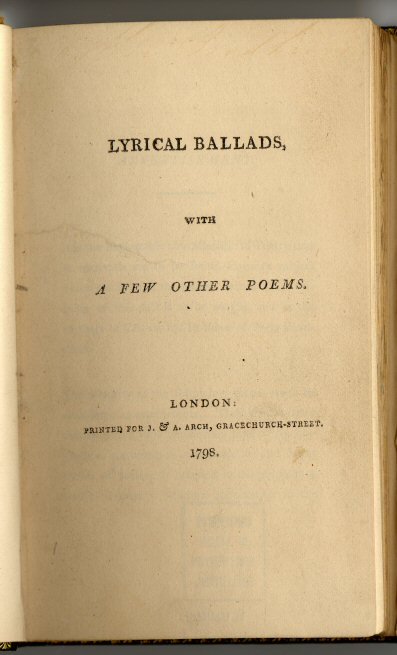
Above is shown the 1798 edition of Lyrical Ballads. "Michael" was added in Wordsworth's 1800 edition.

"Michael" is a pastoral poem, written by William Wordsworth and first published in the 1800 edition of Lyrical Ballads, a series of poems that were said to have begun the English Romantic movement in literature. The poem is one of Wordsworth's best-known poems and the subject of much critical literature. It tells the story of an ageing shepherd, Michael, his wife Isabel, and his only child Luke.

Analyses have claimed "Michael" to have been a political statement regarding the modernization of England, due to the advent of the enclosure system—erasing the idyllic pastoral way of life that Michael formerly enjoyed. Nevertheless, scholar Deanne Westbrook interpreted the worked to be as a New Testament-esque parable and even a metaparable.

== Structure and style ==
As noted by scholar Judith Page, traditional pastorals generally stretched back to Ancient Greece, with pastorals contemporary to Wordsworth following ancient Greek models—often giving their protagonist Ancient Grecian names. Furthermore, life depicted in other pastorals was oftentimes idyllic and focused on the beauty of the landscape and the joy of simplicity. According to the Princeton Encyclopedia of Poetry and Poetics, the genre is traditionally "short, typically less than 150 lines long, and plot and character development are minimal: pastoral’s major innovation is to make the performance of an internal poetic event."

Despite the dissipation of Michael's life as the poem advances, Page notes how Wordsworth maintained the balance and evenness of his lines. She especially stresses the restraint that Wordsworth exhibits with "primarily monosyllabic and bisyllabic diction."

"Michael" is primarily written in blank verse, which is unrhymed iambic pentameter, despite the beginning stanza of "Michael" consisting of irregular iambic pentameter. Page notes that some previous Wordsworth pastorals were rhymed. Therefore, "Michael" is different from most pastorals, because it diverts from traditional rhyme schemes that were common in the genre. "Michael" is also 484 lines, and is told from a first-person omniscient perspective. Below is a representation of meter from lines 59-61, with x indicating an unstressed syllable and / indicating a stressed syllable.

 x /  x    /   x  / x    /  x     /

Amid the heart of many thousand mists,

x      /   x  /    x    /   x   /   x     /

That came to him, and left him, on the heights.

x    /   x   /    x   /   x     /   x    /

So lived he till his eightieth year was past.

== Summary ==
Michael lost half his land when he used it as a surety for a nephew who had met with financial misfortune. When Luke reaches the age of 18, Michael sends Luke to stay in London with a merchant that he might learn a trade and acquire sufficient wealth to regain the land that Michael has lost. It breaks Michael's heart to send Luke away and he makes Luke lay the first stone of a sheepfold as a covenant between them that Luke will return. However, Luke is corrupted in the city and is forced to flee the country and Michael must live out his life without his son. He returns sometimes to the sheepfold but no longer has the heart to complete it.

== Characters ==
Michael: the protagonist of the poem, he is strong and hardworking—with a strong love of his land. He is the husband of Isabel and father of Luke, his beloved son. He is eighty years old at the start of the poem.

Isabel: the wife of Michael, she is a prodigious woman. She spends her time spinning wool and flax, and is the mother of Luke. She is sixty years old at the start of the poem.

Luke: the son and only child of Michael and Isabel, he is Michael's most treasured family member. Luke is set to continue the family's pastoral tradition, but his time away corrupts him. He is eighteen years old at the start of the poem.

== Background ==
Wordsworth's decision to write "Michael" was influenced by the social turmoil he believed was being exhibited in England at the time. According to Pepper, Wordsworth was attempting to turn the attention of readers towards the increasing urbanization of England and its impact on pastoral life. The industrialization of England came with the English policy of enclosures, which led to the suffering of rural workers. Enclosures meant the agrarian workers lost access to pastoral land that they'd had access to for hundreds of years, thereby depriving many of their livelihoods. Michael, his wife Isabel, and his son Luke are thereby seen as victims of this movement, according to scholar Richard Lessa.

Simultaneously, scholars like Westbrook have alternate interpretations of Wordsworth's poem, especially relating to its biblical allusions, which manifest in names, figures, phrases, and images. Westbrook's view of the poem is not one of social cognizance, rather, it's one that characterizes it as a veiled parable. Westbrook calls to mind Michael's biblical similarities to the story of Abraham and Isaac and the Parable of the Prodigal Son, however, insists that "Michael" is a metaparable in its own right. Westbrook says that Wordsworth's purpose was to "both to veil and reveal the spirit of things."

== In popular culture ==
The epigraph of George Eliot's Silas Marner is taken from the poem.

In May 2021, President Michael D. Higgins of Ireland wrote about "Michael" in a birthday letter to American folk singer Bob Dylan: "[The poem] deals with the consequences of the enclosures in England in the 18th Century, and their making of a working-class of men, women, and children for the factory system at the cost of intimate rural life." Higgins compared the contributions of Dylan towards the working class to Wordsworth's, in how both reflected their exploitation and hard work.
