= Gwen and Vera's Fields =

Nature reserve in Gloucestershire, England

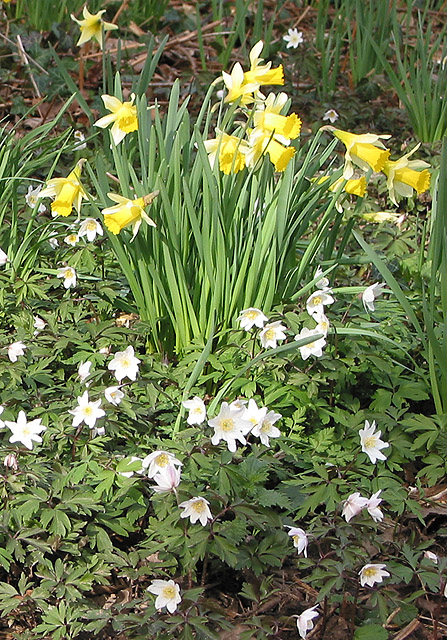
- Typical flowering of wild daffodil and wood anemone (Dymock Woods)

- Location within Gloucestershire
- Type: Gloucestershire Wildlife Trust nature reserve
- Location: In the Forest of Dean district, north-west of Newent
- Coordinates: 51°56′48.3″N 02°26′36.4″W
- Area: 0.7 acres (0.28 ha)
- Created: 1987
- Operator: Gloucestershire Wildlife Trust
- Status: View from entrance gates only (requested non entry to reserve)

Gwen and Vera's Fields (grid reference SO696277) is a 0.28-hectare (0.69-acre) nature reserve in Gloucestershire.

The site, which consists of two separate fields, is owned and managed by the Gloucestershire Wildlife Trust. It was purchased by the trust in 1987 with funding help from an anonymous donor. The site is listed in the 'Forest of Dean Local Plan Review' as a Key Wildlife Site (KWS).

== Location and history ==
The site is located about two miles north-west of Newent and is to the south of Greenaway's Wood. Both lie to the south of Betty Daw's Wood, which is part of Dymock Woods SSSI. Greenaway's Wood bank is the northern boundary of the nature reserve.

The two fields were owned by the Forestry Commission and records show this ownership was from the 1920s. The narrow strip of land formed part of a holding of Wain Cottage which adjoined the fields. The fields were pasture and orchard. Both fields have old apple, plum and pear trees. The soil is damp, loamy clay.

== Flora and fauna ==
Gwen and Vera's Fields support an abundant population of wild daffodils amongst other species. wood anemones are also abundant, moving into the fields from the adjacent woodland. Other flowering plants include cowslip, common knapweed, oxeye daisy, perforate St John's-wort, wild angelica and meadowsweet. Meadow saffron is recorded for the west field as well as common spotted orchid.

Being adjacent to woodland, plants of the woodland varieties grow along the fields edges, such as barren strawberry, wood spurge and wood avens, with various ferns. The woodland trees include oak, wild cherry and field maple.

Hazel, hawthorn, blackthorn, dog rose, bramble, goat willow and ash form hedges between the reserve and the road.

Bird life in the woodland edge includes nuthatch, chiffchaff and blackcap.

== Wild Daffodil Trail ==
The Wild Daffodil Trail is a selection of walks which incorporate a number of nature reserves. These have spectacular displays of wild daffodils and include Gwen and Vera's Fields, Betty Daw's Wood (which is part of Dymock Woods SSSI), Ketford Bank and Vell Mill Daffodil Meadow.

One walk is the Dymock to Ketford walk which includes Vell Mill Meadow, Callow Farm conservation walk area and Ketford Bank (about 8 miles). Another walk includes Betty Daw's Wood and Gwen and Vera's Fields (about 2 miles).

== Threat to species ==
The threats to the wild daffodil are numerous and include fragmentation of sites and the neglect of their required habitat, and the issue of the invasion of non-native species. Ploughing and the use of chemical fertilisers have also contributed to their loss.

== Conservation ==
The fields are traditionally managed by a summer hay cut and then grazed by sheep. This ensures control of high growth and supports the spread of wildflowers.

== Publications ==
- Kelham, A, Sanderson, J, Doe, J, Edgeley-Smith, M, et al., 1979, 1990, 2002 editions, 'Nature Reserves of the Gloucestershire Trust for Nature Conservation/Gloucestershire Wildlife Trust'
- ‘Nature Reserve Guide – discover the wild Gloucestershire on your doorstep’ - 50th Anniversary, January 2011, Gloucestershire Wildlife Trust
- 'The Daffodil Trails', (undated), Gloucestershire Wildlife Trust
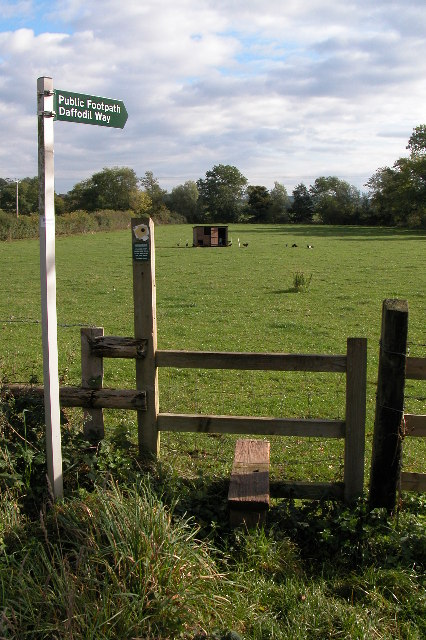
Daffodil Way Trail
