= Vell Mill Daffodil Meadow =

Nature reserve in Gloucestershire, England

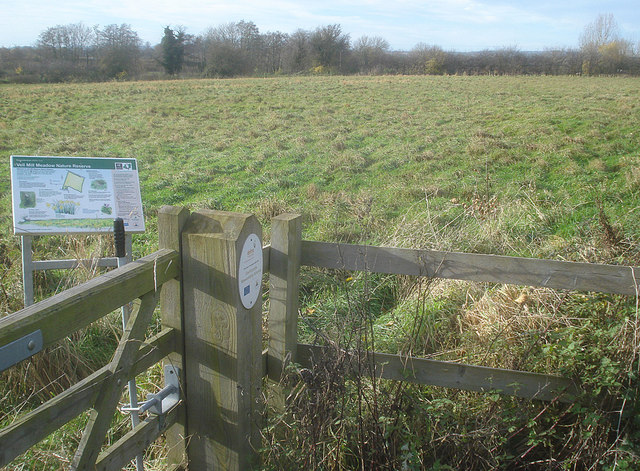
- Vell Mill Daffodil Meadow out of the flowering season

- Location within Gloucestershire
- Type: Gloucestershire Wildlife Trust nature reserve
- Location: In the Forest of Dean district, east of Dymock by River Leadon
- Coordinates: 51°58′50.71″N 2°25′22.51″W
- Area: 5.1 acres (2.1 ha)
- Created: 1990
- Operator: Gloucestershire Wildlife Trust
- Status: Open all year

Vell Mill Daffodil Meadow (grid reference SO710314) is a 2.1-hectare (5.2-acre) nature reserve in Gloucestershire.

The site is owned and managed by the Gloucestershire Wildlife Trust. It was purchased by the Trust in 1990. The site is listed in the 'Forest of Dean Local Plan Review' as a Key Wildlife Site (KWS).

== Location and significant species ==
The site is located in the River Leadon Valley and is next to the river. It is about half mile east of Dymock.

Vell Mill Daffodil Meadow supports an abundant population of wild daffodils, and is considered to be one of the best surviving meadows in this area of Gloucestershire where the plants flourish .

== Other flora ==
Once the daffodil flowering is over (usually about March), the site remains of interest for its hedgerows and meadow flora. Species recorded include cowslip, hoary plantain, common dog-violet and meadow vetchling, which are meadow varieties. Hedgerow varieties include hop, sweet violet, dog's mercury, barren strawberry, hedge bedstraw and greater stitchwort.

The hedges comprise hawthorn, blackthorn and hazel. Alder and ash grow on the river edge.

== Fauna ==
The hedges support nesting birds. The River Leadow is used by the European otter.

== Wild Daffodil Trail ==
The Wild Daffodil Trail is a selection of walks which incorporate a number of sites which have spectacular displays of wild daffodils. The walks incorporate a series of nature reserves including Vell Mill Daffodil Meadow. These are Betty Daw's Wood (which is part of Dymock Woods SSSI), Gwen and Vera's Fields and Ketford Bank.

One walk is the Dymock to Ketford walk which includes Vell Mill Meadow, Callow Farm conservation walk area and Ketford Bank (about 8 miles). Another walk includes Betty Daw's Wood and Gwen and Vera's Fields, the latter being near Newent (about 2 miles).

== Threat to species ==
The threats to the wild daffodil are numerous and include fragmentation of sites and the neglect of their required habitat. There is also the issue of the invasion of non native species. Ploughing and the use of chemical fertilisers has also contributed to their loss.

== Conservation ==
The meadow is traditionally managed as it is cut for hay and then grazed outside the daffodil season. A pond has been dug and has been left to colonise naturally with river plants.

== Link to local poets ==
There are two poets' paths near Vell Mill Daffodil Meadow. These paths commemorate the Dymock Poets who lived in the area in the early 20th century. The area is claimed to be a source of their inspiration.

== Gallery ==
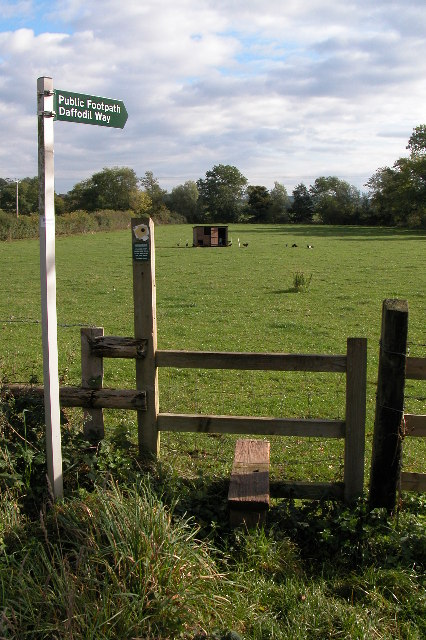
Daffodil Way Trail

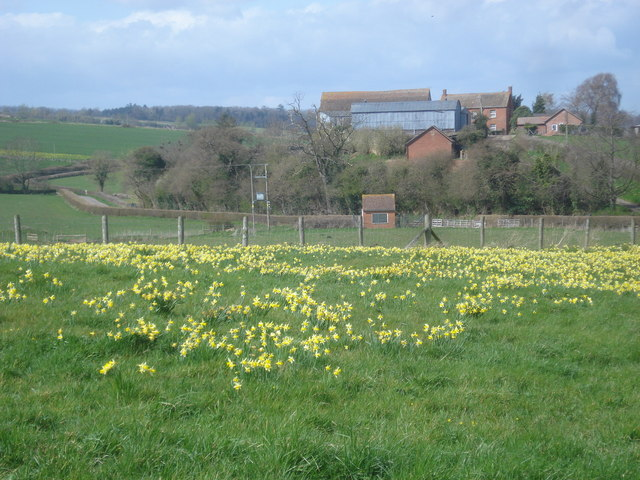
Typical wild daffodil field off the trail

== Publications ==
- Kelham, A, Sanderson, J, Doe, J, Edgeley-Smith, M, et al., 1979, 1990, 2002 editions, 'Nature Reserves of the Gloucestershire Trust for Nature Conservation/Gloucestershire Wildlife Trust'
- ‘Nature Reserve Guide – discover the wild Gloucestershire on your doorstep’ - 50th Anniversary, January 2011, Gloucestershire Wildlife Trust
- 'The Daffodil Trails', (undated), Gloucestershire Wildlife Trust
