= List of local nature reserves in North Yorkshire =

This is a list of local nature reserves (LNR) in North Yorkshire. The list accounts for the post-1974 area of North Yorkshire, and includes the local authority areas of Middlesbrough and Redcar and Cleveland as well as the City of York. As such, it includes areas in places such as Harrogate, that prior to 1974, were in the historic county of the West Riding of Yorkshire.

Local nature reserves (LNRs) are designated by local authorities under the National Parks and Access to the Countryside Act 1949. The local authority must have a legal control over the site, by owning or leasing it or having an agreement with the owner. LNRs are sites which have a special local interest either biologically or geologically, and local authorities have a duty to care for them. They can apply local bye-laws to manage and protect LNRs. As of May 2018, North Yorkshire has 18 designated local nature reserves.

== Sites ==
Site	Photograph	Area	Location	Declaring authority	Coordinates	Description	Ref
Acomb Wood and Meadow		4.32 acres (1.75 ha)	Acomb	York City Council	53°56′14.0″N 1°07′59.0″W	Site was designated in March 2007.	
Ballowfield		2.3 acres (0.93 hectares)	Carperby	Yorkshire Dales National Park Authority	54°18′18.5″N 2°01′28.5″W	The site is noted for its Spring Sandwort population (Metallophytes) which are in abundance on former lead workings, especially at Ballowfield, but quite rare across Britain.	
Barlow Common		90 acres (36.6 hectares)	Barlow	North Yorkshire Council	53°45′04.9″N 1°02′38.2″W	The site was used as a spoil and ballast tip by the railways until 1983. A lake was created as part of the remediation of the site and Selby District Council took over running the site in 1986 (the site is now run by the Yorkshire Wildlife Trust). It was declared a LNR in 2002.	
Birk Crag		27 acres (11 ha)	Harrogate	North Yorkshire Council	53°59′12.3″N 1°34′43.3″W	Birk Crag is 1 mile (1.6 km) to the south west of Harrogate and is one of only two places in Britain that has a resident population of the endangered click beetle. The site was designated as an LNR in January 1993.	
Cleatop Park		35.8 acres (14.47 hectares)	Settle	Yorkshire Dales National Park Authority	54°02′41.5″N 2°16′37.6″W	Just over 1 mile (1.6 km) south of Settle, the reserve was designated in June 2006.	
Clifton Backies		45.9 acres (18.58 hectares)	York	York City Council	53°58′44.8″N 1°05′31.2″W	Largely sited on a former RAF Clifton airfield, the site was designated in 2002.	
Farndale Local Nature Reserve		157 hectares (388 acres)	Farndale	North York Moors National Park Authority	54°21′32.1″N 0°58′18.8″W	Farndale was designated as an LNR in 1955	
Foxglove Covert		100 acres (40 ha)	Catterick Garrison	North Yorkshire Council	54°22′05.7″N 1°45′15.0″W	Opened in 1992, visitors need to go through the Garrison security to access the reserve. Site was the first LNR on Ministry of Defence land and the first LNR in Richmondshire.	
Freeholders Wood and Riddings Field		31 acres (13 ha)	Aysgarth	Yorkshire Dales National Park Authority	54°17′44.6″N 1°58′48.7″W	Is located on the northern side of the River Ure east of Aysgarth. The woodlands are hundreds of years old.	
Hell Wath		21.9 acres (8.88 hectares)	Ripon	North Yorkshire Council	54°07′45.2″N 1°32′18.7″W	Designated in 1993, Hell Wath is a nature reserve to the west of the city of Ripon and alongside the River Skell.	
Hob Moor		89 acres (36 hectares)	York	York City Council	53°56′48.7″N 1°06′47.4″W	Designated in 2003, Hob Moor is one of the Strays of York; and ancient common just south west of the city centre of York. The moor has cattle grazing upon it and has not been improved or had fertiliser spread over it in its history.	
Hookstone Wood		18.7 acres (7.56 hectares)	Harrogate	North Yorkshire Council	53°58′50.2″N 1°30′57.6″W	2 miles (3.2 km) south-east of Harrogate town centre, Hookstone Wood is an important woodland site for damselflies and dragonflies. The site was designated in 1993.	
Langcliffe and Attermire		50 acres (20 ha)	Langcliffe	Yorkshire Dales National Park Authority	54°04′41.9″N 2°14′48.4″W	Declared in 2004, the reserve is noted for its stone and the grasses and flowers that grow in and around them.	
Nosterfield		60 acres (24 ha) (Note: The site is proposed to extend to 250 acres (100 ha) when adjacent quarry workings become exhausted.)	West Tanfield	North Yorkshire Council	54°12′42.3″N 1°34′34.3″W	Nosterfield is a former sand and gravel quarry north east of West Tanfield and just west of Thornborough Henges. It was declared in June 2006 and is run by the Lower Ure Conservation Trust (LUCT). The first Bittern recorded in North Yorkshire was at Nosterfield.	
Quarry Moor		23 acres (9.2 hectares)	Ripon	North Yorkshire Council	54°07′11.5″N 1°31′40.5″W	The site was donated to the city in 1945 and designated as an LNR in January 2001. It is of national significance because of its magnesian limestone bedrock which allows diverse plants to grow. The site is owned and operated by Ripon City Council.	
St Nicholas Fields		24 acres (9.7 ha)	York	City of York Council	53°57′27.0″N 1°03′43.1″W	Opened in 2004, St Nicholas Fields was previously the landfill site for the City of York. It stopped receiving waste in 1974 and during the 1980s was subject to a clean-up campaign. It was awarded LNR status in 2004	
The Dell		14 acres (5.5 hectares)	Eastfield, Scarborough	North Yorkshire Council	54°15′36.9″N 0°25′39.7″W	Designated in October 2012, The Dell is an urban fringe that has been adorned with chainsaw sculptures.	
