= Ketford Bank =

Nature reserve in Gloucestershire, England

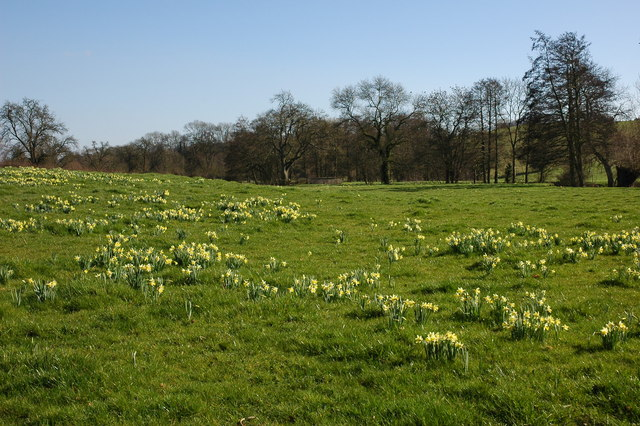
- A typical bank of wild daffodils in the Leadon Valley

- Location within Gloucestershire
- Type: Gloucestershire Wildlife Trust nature reserve
- Location: In the Forest of Dean district, near Pauntley, Redmarley and Dymock
- Coordinates: 51°58′31.52″N 2°24′14.2″W
- Area: 1.7 acres (0.69 ha)
- Created: 2010
- Operator: Gloucestershire Wildlife Trust
- Status: Open all year

Ketford Bank (grid reference SO723308) is a 0.69-hectare (1.7-acre) nature reserve in Gloucestershire.

The site is owned and managed by the Gloucestershire Wildlife Trust. It was purchased by the Trust in February 2010. It had been in private ownership.

== Location ==
The site is located in the River Leadon Valley and may be reached using a public bridleway between Redmarley and Dymock. Ketford is one of three hamlets in the Parish of Pauntley. It is in the Forest of Dean district.

== Significant species ==
Ketford Bank supports an abundant population of Wild Daffodils. This area of Gloucestershire has traditionally supported this particular plant, which grows in the woods and pastures. Natural England image library contains photographs taken in 1991 of Ketford Bank which show the abundance of Wild Daffodils.

A site survey of the flora is reported to have been carried out in the early 1990s which indicated a variety of species present. Whilst there was encroachment of Bracken and scrub on the site over the last decade, the site has been recovered and is managed by grazing.

== Wild Daffodil Trail ==
The Wild Daffodil Trail is a selection of walks which incorporate a number of sites which have spectacular displays of Wild Daffodils. The walks incorporate a series of nature reserves including Ketford Bank. These are Betty Daw's Wood (which is part of Dymock Woods SSSI), Gwen and Vera's Fields and Vell Mill Daffodil Meadow.

One walk is the Dymock to Ketford walk which includes Vell Mill Meadow, Callow Farm conservation walk area and Ketford Bank (about 8 miles). Another walk includes Betty Daw's Wood and Gwen and Vera's fields, the latter being near Newent (about 2 miles).

== Threat to species ==
The threats to the Wild Daffodil are numerous and include fragmentation of sites and the neglect of their required habitat. There is also the issue of the invasion of non native species.

== Link to local poets ==
The bridleway from Ketford to Dymock is one of the Poets' Paths. These commemorate the Dymock Poets who lived in the area in the early 20th century. The area is claimed to be a source of their inspiration.

== Publications ==
- ‘Nature Reserve Guide – discover the wild Gloucestershire on your doorstep’ - 50th Anniversary, January 2011, Gloucestershire Wildlife Trust
- 'The Daffodil Trails', (undated), Gloucestershire Wildlife Trust
