= Church Houses =

Hamlet in North Yorkshire, England

Coordinates: 54.368°N 0.970°W

- Hamlet
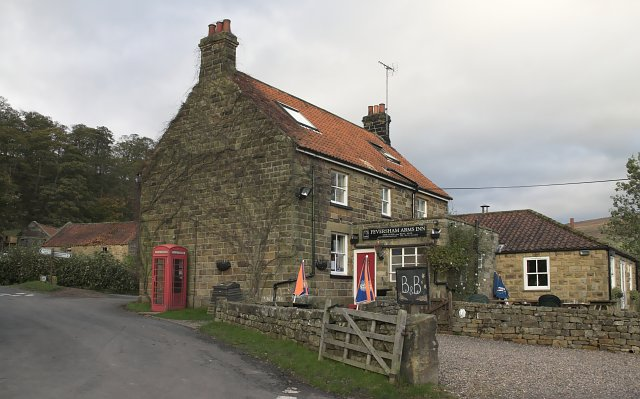
- Feversham Arms Inn at Church Houses

- Location within North Yorkshire
- OS grid reference: SE669975
- Civil parish: Farndale East
- Unitary authority: North Yorkshire
- Ceremonial county: North Yorkshire
- Region: Yorkshire and the Humber
- Country: England
- Sovereign state: United Kingdom
- Post town: YORK
- Postcode district: YO62
- Police: North Yorkshire
- Fire: North Yorkshire
- Ambulance: Yorkshire
- UK Parliament: Thirsk and Malton Constituency

Church Houses is a hamlet in Farndale, North Yorkshire, England. The hamlet is just to the east of the River Dove in upper Farndale, and is about 150 metres (490 ft) above sea level. The nearest town to the south is Kirkbymoorside, 8 miles (13 km) away, and Castleton is also 8 miles (13 km) but to the north. It is one of three hamlets in the Farndale valley, though it is sometimes referred to as a village (it has a village hall), and on account of the church just to the east, although the hamlet only consists of seven buildings. The hamlet is within the North York Moors national park area.

== History ==
Farndale was arable and pasture land during the late Middle Ages; monks from Rievaulx held the rights to keep cattle in the valley. Church Houses is one of three hamlets in the valley (the other two being Lowna and Low Mill), but there is no settlement named Farndale. Church Houses lies to the east of the River Dove in Upper Farndale at a height of 150 metres (490 ft) above sea level, and the roads through the hamlet serve as a central point with lanes radiating out of the valley in four directions. The extant buildings at High Mill, just to the south of Church Houses, are grade II listed. The building used to have a waterwheel which was used to grind corn. A mill was recorded on this site as far back as 1276.

The hamlet is best known for being the starting/finishing point of the daffodil walks that people undertake in the valley in late March/early April. Farndale is renowned for its daffodils which grow in the valley in their thousands. The hamlet has a pub, the Feversham Arms which dates back to the 19th century, and whilst the low number of dwellings in Church Houses provided little custom, the pub is popular will hill-farmers and visitors from the surrounding areas. The pub used to be the recreational meeting point of the Farndale Hunt, one of the oldest established hunts in England (pre-dating 1835), but which disbanded in 2015.

The old school house, which was built in 1833 and is a grade II listed building, has now been converted into a private dwelling, and just east of the hamlet, is the Church of St Mary, which is also grade II listed. The ecclesiastical parish of Farndale East Side used to have a chapel of ease, a daughter church of the parish church in Lastingham, which was built in 1638, but St Mary's Church was built on the site in 1831, and extended between 1907 and 1914. A survey of the churchyard in 1990 determined that it contained the graves of 225 people. The church has a "...chancel, nave, vestry, large porch, a western bell gable with one bell, and sitting for 300 people."

The village hall, which was re-built in 2019, replacing a structure that had acted as the village hall for 70 years previously, is considered eco-friendly, and the annual Farndale Show is held at the showfield in Church Houses. The show in 2024 was the 115th show. The showfield also doubles as the pitch for High Farndale Cricket Club, who play in the Feversham League alongside five other teams. The Feversham League is considered to be one of the smallest cricket leagues in Yorkshire. The flat pitch is in a field which has a 1-in-6 drop, and has been described as the "..only flat 22 yards in the dale.." There are no shops in Church Houses, but there is a local store in the nearby hamlet of Low Mill.

The hamlet is within the civil parish of Farndale East Side, and is represented at Westminster as part of the Thirsk and Malton Constituency. Until 2023, it was part of the Ryedale District of North Yorkshire, and in ancient times, was part of the wapentake of Ryedale. In 1977, Ryedale Council estimated that the population of the hamlet was 110, however, at the 2011 census, the population statistics were included within the civil parish of Farndale West. A public bus service runs in spring in conjunction with the blooming of daffodils in the valley, otherwise, the nearest Moorsbus service runs to the east of the hamlet past the Lion Inn and Blakey Ridge.

A pre-Second World War plan to flood Farndale to provide a reservoir was resurrected in the 1960s and 1970s. The Hull Corporation installed a weir over Hodge Beck in neighbouring Bransdale (which was also planned to be flooded) to measure flow rates. If it had been approved, the dam would have been able to provide 88,000,000 imperial gallons (400,000,000 L; 106,000,000 US gal) of water a day to Kingston upon Hull and Sheffield. The reservoir would have taken up the complete upper dale and would have seen a dam head 130 feet (40 m) high at the northern end of Church Houses. The plan was never carried out; at a further reading of the bill in 1970, the chairman of the Parliamentary Select Committee enacted a protocol barring members who had previously voted for the scheme from voting again, and the bill was refused.

== See also ==
- Listed buildings in Farndale East
