= Farndale =

Valley in North Yorkshire, England

Coordinates: 54°22′05″N 0°58′29″W

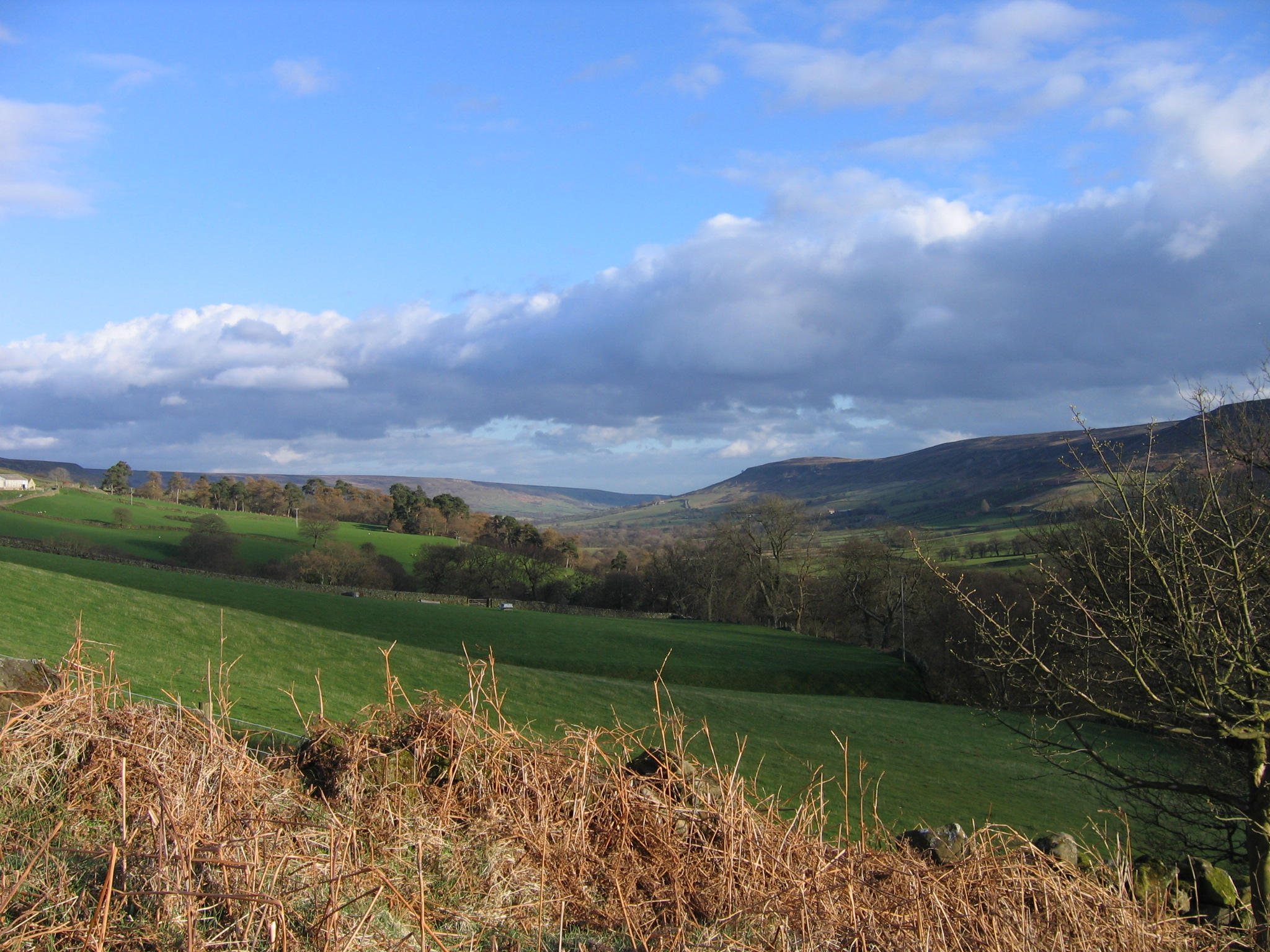
- Farndale

- Location within North Yorkshire
- Population: 160 (2021 census)
- OS grid reference: SE673952
- Civil parish: Farndale East and Farndale West
- Unitary authority: North Yorkshire
- Ceremonial county: North Yorkshire
- Region: Yorkshire and the Humber
- Country: England
- Sovereign state: United Kingdom
- Post town: YORK
- Postcode district: YO62 7
- Dialling code: 01751
- Police: North Yorkshire
- Fire: North Yorkshire
- Ambulance: Yorkshire
- UK Parliament: Thirsk and Malton

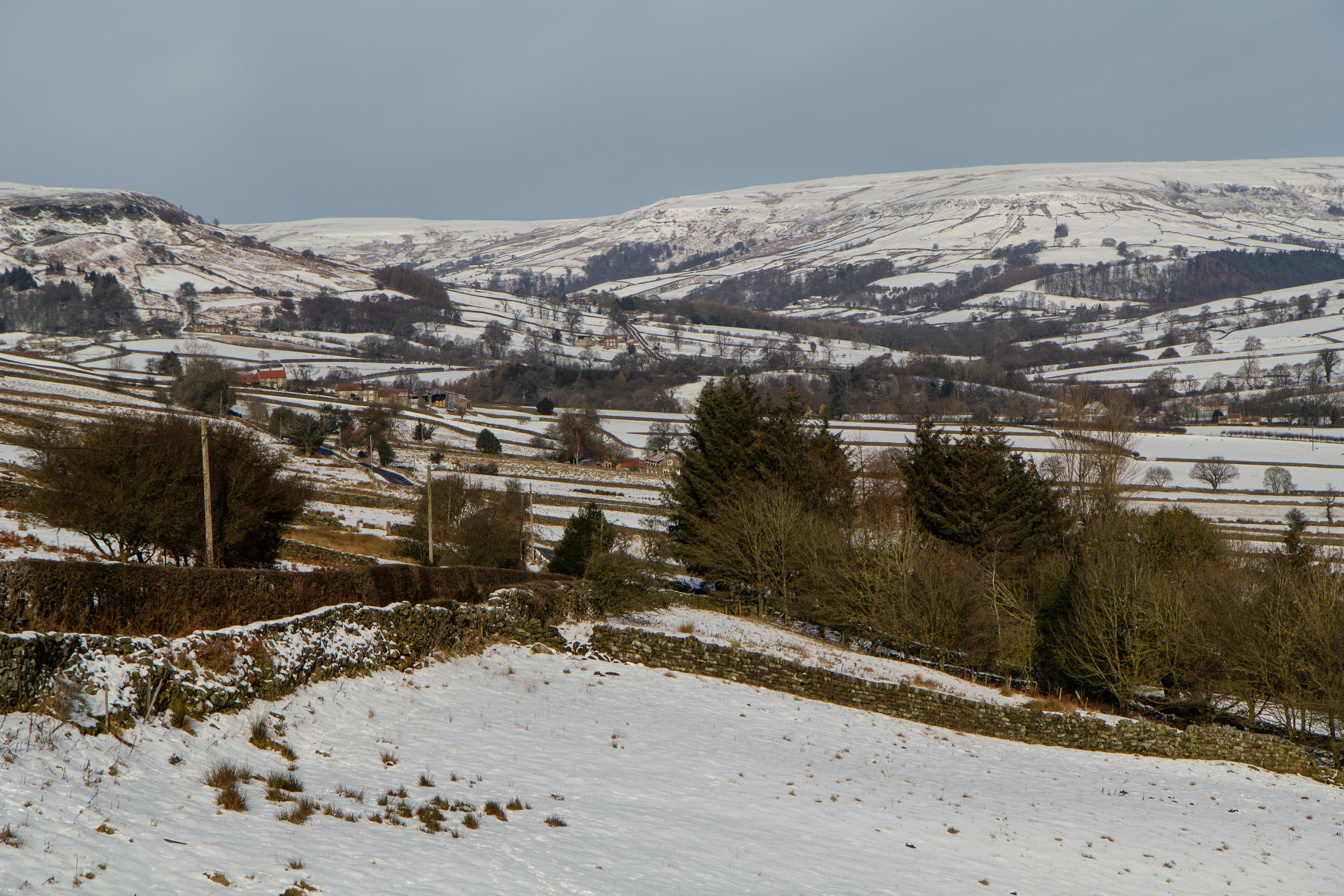
Farndale in winter looking north

Farndale is a valley and community in North Yorkshire, England, which is known for the daffodils which flower each spring along a 7-mile (11 km) stretch of the River Dove. The valley is in the North York Moors National Park, some 11 miles (18 km) north of Kirkbymoorside, the nearest town. Pickering is some 17 miles (27 km) to the south-east and Helmsley 17 miles (27 km) to the south-west.

Farndale is an isolated, scattered agricultural community with traditional Yorkshire dry stone walls. The valley is popular with walkers due to its famous wild daffodils, which can be seen around Easter time all along the banks of the River Dove. To protect the daffodils the majority of Farndale north of Lowna was created a Local Nature Reserve in 1955.

Farndale is home to three hamlets; Church Houses at the top of the valley and Low Mill further down, with Lowna at the south. Low Mill is a tourist honeypot during daffodil season as this is where the famous daffodil walk begins. While near the northern end of the daffodil walk is at High Mill a cluster of houses a short distance down a lane from Church Houses. Lowna is on the Hutton-le-Hole to Gillamoor Road at the south where Farndale changes to Douthwaitedale, while within the Dale it is actually within Gillamoor parish.

== Etymology ==
The name of Farndale has changed through history:

There is no mention of Farndale in Domesday Book.

It is recorded as:

• Farnedale in 1154

• Farendale in the late 12th century

• Farndal(e) in 1279

Sources disagree on the origin of the name Farndale, although it is a combination of two parts "Farn" and "Dale".

There a four possible origins for "Farn" all of which do describe the dale although the most likely are Scandinavian or Celtic. It may be derived from the Celtic "Faren" meaning beautiful; alternatively it could be derived from the Scandinavian "får" meaning sheep or possibly from Old English "Fearn" meaning fern or ferny place or from the Gaelic "Feàrna" which means alder tree of which there are many in Farndale.

While Dale probably means Valley either derived from Scandinavion "Dalr" or Anglian "Dæl" although it could be derived from the Gaelic "Dail" meaning level field by a river.

The name of the River Dove which flows through Farndale is almost definitely from either the Old British "Dubo" meaning Black or from the Gaelic "Dubh" also meaning black, hence Black (or Dark) River.

== Geography ==
Farndale is a valley within the North York Moors, it is surrounded by some of the wildest moorland in England. The dale is sandwiched between Bransdale to the west, Rosedale to the east and Westerdale to the north. To the north-east sits Blakey Ridge at over 1,312 feet (400 m) above sea level, and to the north-west, Cockayne Ridge reaching up to 1,490 feet (454 m) above sea level is one of the highest points of the North York Moors. The southern boundary of the Farndale Parishes are along Harland Beck and Shortsha Beck (across Lowna Lund), although the Gillamoor to Hutton-le-Hole road is considered as the boundary for all other purposes, south of this the dale continues but changes its name to Douthwaitedale, though the Tabular Hills until it reaches Keldhome then Kirkby Mills just east of Kirkbymoorside.

The River Dove rises on Westerdale Moor North of Farndale, then flows through Farndale south-east past to Church Houses. Here it turns south and continues meandering past Low Mill to Lowna. At Gillamoor it heads south-east again past Hutton-le-Hole before returning southwards past Ravenswick and to the east of Kirkbymoorside. It continues past Keldholme and Kikrby Mills to Great Edstone. From there it flows south-south-east to where it joins the River Rye in the Vale of Pickering near the village of Salton. Several tributaries meet the Dove through Farndale.

== Population ==
The combined population of the civil parishes of Farndale East and Farndale West at the time of the 2021 Census was 160. The census Figures are combined under Farndale West.

In recent years there has been a negative trend in the population as indicated by the following population estimate and censuses.

• 2015 the population had been estimated at 180.

• 2011 Census showed the population as 207.

• 2001 the Census recorded the population as 211.

With the population having decreased greatly from the 668 that is recorded in "A Topographical Dictionary of Yorkshire" by Thomas Lansdale published in 1822 when farndale East side had a population of 455 and Farndale West Side had a Population of 213.

== Local nature reserve ==
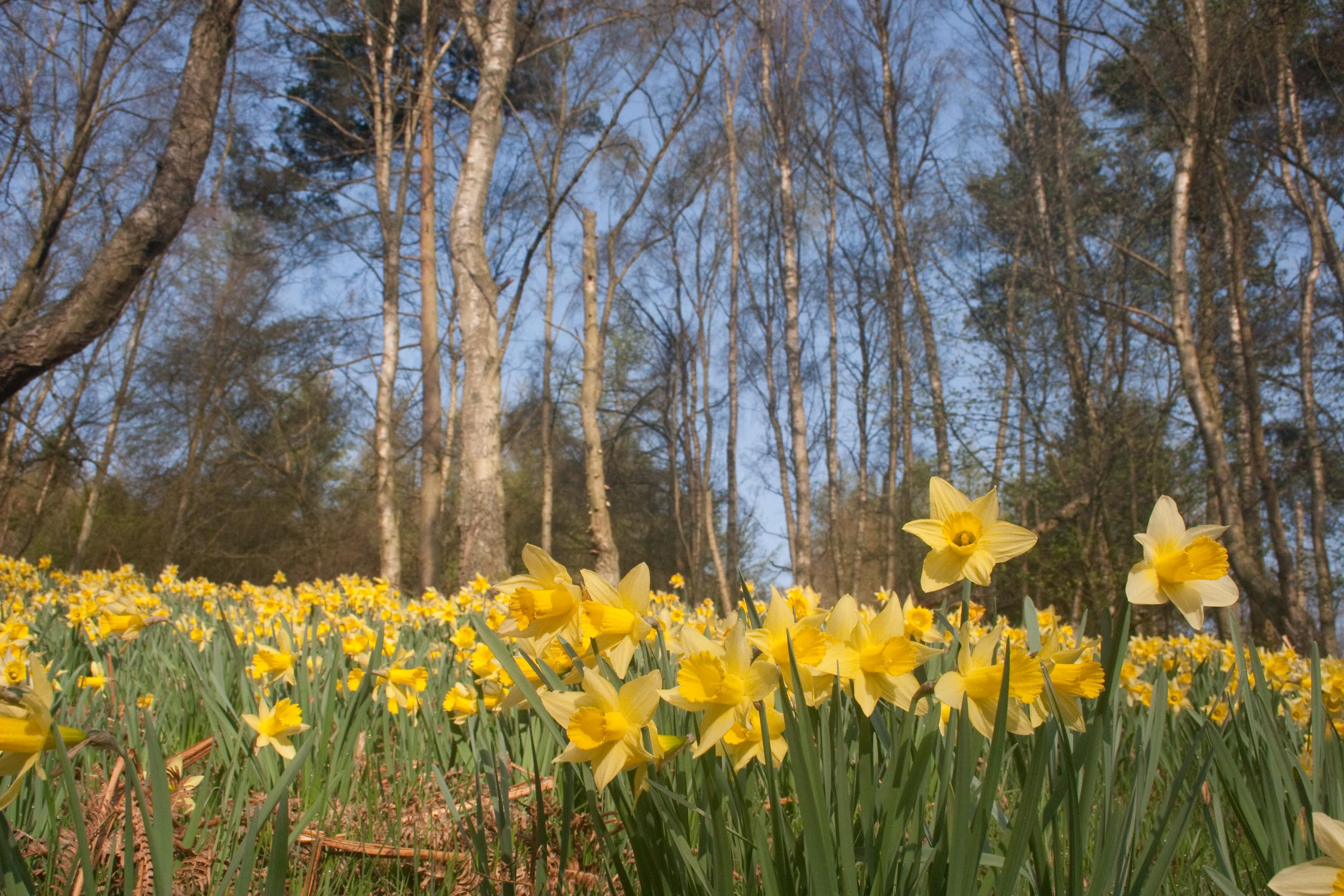
Farndale Daffodils

The Farndale Local Nature Reserve constitutes the majority of Farndale, which is a dale within the North York Moors National Park. It was created in 1955 to protect the wild daffodils (narcissus pseudonarcissus), for which the dale is famed. The Local Nature reserve comprises the larger part of the Farndale Site of Special Scientific Interest which comprises 390 acres (157 ha).

Over 40,000 people visit the dale in the springtime to walk along the River Dove and see the daffodils. The variety of daffodil that grows wild in the valley, has shorter stems than the cultivated variety and are believed to have been planted by monks in medieval times. The daffodils are also known as Lent Lilies in Farndale and they usually appear around Lent.

== Long distance footpaths ==
Around the north of Farndale, between Bloworth Crossing and Blakey is the track bed of the old Rosedale Ironstone Railway (Rosedale Branch) which forms part of three Long Distance Footpaths these being Wainwright's Coast to Coast Walk, the Lyke Wake Walk and the Esk Valley Walk.

== Governance ==
Farndale was historically divided between three ancient parishes. Farndale Eastside was a township in the parish of Lastingham. The township of Farndale High Quarter and Bransdale Eastside (also known as Farndale Westside) and the township of Farndale Low Quarter (also known as Low Farndale) were in the parish of Kirkbymoorside.

In 1873 Farndale Hiqh Quarter and Farndale Westside joined to become a single parish. The Farndale parishes were subsequently realigned to Farndale East and Farndale West. The dividing line between the two Farndale civil parishes is along the course of the River Dove. Until 2018 Farndale East had a Parish Council responsible for the eastern side including Church Houses and Farndale West had a Parish Meeting looking after the western side including Low Mill.

In April 2018 a joint Farndale Parish Council was formed under a grouping order and it now represents the interests of all residents in Farndale.

Between 1974 and 2023 the area was part of the Ryedale district. It is now administered by the unitary North Yorkshire Council.

Farndale is part of the Thirsk and Malton UK Parliament constituency and formerly the Yorkshire and the Humber European Parliamentary constituency.

== Religious sites ==
Farndale originally had a parish church and mission room and two Methodist chapels but now has only St Mary's parish church.

=== Church of England ===
St Mary's Church, Farndale is a Grade II listed, built in 1831 by William Stonehouse and restored and extended in 1907–14 by Temple Moore. Originally a chapel of ease in Lastingham parish, it is now within the Kirkbymoorside benefice.

The Farndale War memorial commemorating the men of Farndale lost in the First World War is near the church entrance; those named are: William Breckon, Charles Duncombe, Earl Of Feversham, Joseph Garbutt, Albert Handley, Joseph Handley, Percival Maw, Frederick Mortimer, Thomas Bertie Mortimer, Joseph Ward, Joseph Watson, and Alfred Percy Wilson.

=== Methodist ===
Both Low Mill Methodist Chapel closed and was converted to residential dwelling around 1984 and High Farndale Methodist chapels closed in 2018.

=== Quakers ===
At the south of the dale is the Lowna Quaker burial ground used between 1675 and 1854 where 114 Quakers are laid to rest.

=== Catholic Church ===
Farndale used to be part of the giant Blackamoor parish of Nicholas Postgate fame. Today the nearest catholic church is in KIrkbymoorside.

== Farndale Show ==
The annual Farndale Show is an agricultural show which is held on the Summer Bank Holiday Monday in late August and is a popular local event.

The first Farndale Show was held in August 1896, the exhibits were confined to Farndale, Brandale and Rosedale and held near Church Houses.

By 1898 the show had become known by the name Farndale, Bransdale and Rosedale Show having apparently merged or superseded the triennial Bransdale Show first held in 1880 until 1895 and the Rosedale Show first held in 1871 until at least 1878. This name continued to be used as the formal name for the show until the First World War.

In 1900 the Farndale, Bransdale and Rosedale show was held in Rosedale Abbey this proved to be great success, with the result that in 1901 a new Rosedale and Hartoft Show was formed. By 1911 the Rosedale show had become known as the Rosedale, Hartoft and Farndale Show meaning two agricultural shows included the name Farndale this continued until around 1923.

The official name of the Farndale show is the Farndale Agricultural, Horticultural and Industrial Society annual exhibition. In 1988 the society became a charitable organization.

While the show was not held during the two world wars and had previously been cancelled due to Foot-and-mouth disease, the 2009 show was the only time in the history of the show it was cancelled due to the weather. The 100th Show was held in 2006. The show was again cancelled in 2020 and 2021 due to COVID-19, and returned in 2022.

== Farndale hunt ==
The Farndale Hunt may have been one of the oldest in the country. It is known that George Villiers, 2nd Duke of Buckingham stayed with a tenant in Kirkbymoorside and hunted in the area. However the first documented reference states "it dated from 1835", although it is likely to have existed long before this date.

The hunt was disbanded in 2015 although their Facebook page remains active.

The Second World War hunt-class destroyer HMS Farndale was named after the hunt. The ship's bell, still bearing evidence of enemy action, is in the bar of the Feversham Arms Inn, Farndale.

== Farndale reservoir scheme ==
In 1932 the Kingston upon Hull Corporation bought a large area of land in Upper Farndale in the North York Moor, c. 2,000 hectares. The Corporation had a plan to create a large reservoir behind a constructed earth embankment at Church Houses, and then using gravitation through a series of pipes/aqueducts bring a safe and reliable water supply down to Hull (c. 50 miles away). The plans also involved a second stage with weirs constructed in the neighbouring dales of Rosedale and Bransdale (and possibly Westerdale?) – with the collected water piped through the dividing hills into the Farndale Reservoir, if and when demand required it.

This scheme did not get off the ground and then the Second World War intervened. The project was revived in 1965 and a revised plan was produced in 1969. The reservoir was to be 2½ miles long, cover a total of 400 acres and hold 8,000 million gallons of water. Finally, after five years of work, Parliament rejected the bill to create the reservoir. The Farndale scheme was postponed, then formally laid to rest in 1988.

== Notable people ==
Henry Harwood Flintoff who lived in Farndale at the time, was awarded the Edward Medal later exchanged for a George Cross for an act of heroism where he went to the assistance of farmer John Atkinson of Olive House, Farndale and saved him from a bull.

Angus Ashworth, auctioneer and presenter of the Yorkshire Auction House on the UK Discovery Channel and expert on the BBC Antiques Road Trip grew up in Farndale.

== In popular culture ==
Farndale has been used as a location for a number of film and TV locations including:

=== Film ===
The 2020 Film adaption of The Secret Garden includes moorland scenes filmed around Farndale.

The 1975 Film, All Creatures Great and Small starring Simon Ward and Anthony Hopkins, included locations in Farndale.

=== Television ===
In 2019 an episode of the BBC series Walking With... featured Monica Galetti walking between Rosedale and Farndale.

BBC Documentary: A Wild Year, The North York Moors was partly filmed in and around Farndale, and featured the wild daffodils.

Bad Move, an ITV sitcom written by Jack Dee and Pete Sinclair and starring Jack Dee was partly filmed in Farndale. The location of Rawlings' new home is near Low Mill.

Accidental Farmer, a pilot for BBC TV starring Ashley Jensen was partly filmed in Farndale, June / July 2010.

BBC Inside Out covered Heavy Snow in Farndale in November 2010.

A 1991 Tyne Tees television programme "Kirkby's Kingdom" featured the Farndale show.

=== Music ===
Alan Ridout wrote a work called Farndale Dances for solo Piccolo in 1992 consisting of 5 Movements: Down the Dale, Sylvio the Pheasant, Whistling Walker, The Stream and Up the Hill.

Songwriter Graham Miles wrote a folk song called Farndale Daffodils.

A Hymn Tune: Farndale was written by local resident Harold Dobson.

== See also ==
- Listed buildings in Farndale East
- Listed buildings in Farndale West
- River Dove, North Yorkshire
- Church Houses
- Farndale Local Nature Reserve
