= Farndale Local Nature Reserve =

Protected area in North Yorkshire, England

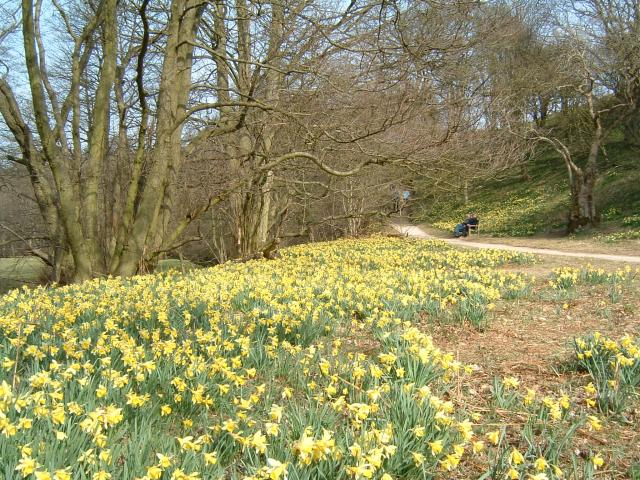
- Daffodils in Farndale
- Interactive map of Farndale Local Nature Reserve
- Location: Reserve
- Coordinates: 54°21′32″N 0°58′18″W
- Owned by: North York Moors National Park
- Plants: Wild daffodils

Farndale Local Nature Reserve is a Local Nature Reserve (LNR) in the valley of Farndale, North Yorkshire, England. It is located within the North York Moors National Park region and is looked after by the North York Moors National Park Authority (NYMNPA). The LNR attracts thousands of visitors in the springtime, who go to see the wild daffodils on display in the valley.

== History ==
The Farndale Local Nature Reserve was designated under Section 21 of the National Parks and Access to the Countryside Act 1949 on 12 March 1956. Local Nature Reserves are places with wildlife or geology that are of special interest locally. The Farndale Local Nature Reserve constitutes the majority of Farndale, which is a dale within the North York Moors National Park. It was created in 1956 to protect the wild daffodils (narcissus pseudonarcissus), for which the dale is famed. The Local Nature Reserve, which covers over 809 hectares (2,000 acres), also includes the larger part of Farndale Site of Special Scientific Interest measured at 157 hectares (388 acres).

Over 40,000 people visit the dale in the springtime to walk along the River Dove and see the daffodils. The variety of daffodil that grows wild in the valley, has shorter stems than the cultivated variety and are believed to have been planted by monks in medieval times. The daffodils are also known as Lent Lilies in Farndale and they usually appear around Lent.

The LNR and wild daffodils at Farndale regularly receive positive recommendations for tourists and visitors in the Lonely Planet and Visit England guides.
