= Royal Oak, Gillamoor =

Pub in North Yorkshire, England

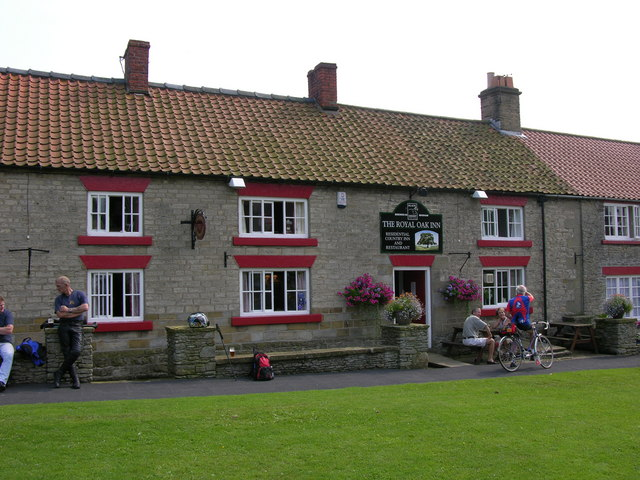
The pub, in 2004

The Royal Oak is a historic pub in Gillamoor, a village in North Yorkshire, in England.

The building may have originally been constructed in the 17th century, but the current structure principally dates from the mid 18th century. It was altered in the 19th century, and was grade II listed in 1987. It operates as a pub with a bar, restaurant, and eight bedrooms.

The pub is built of sandstone, with quoins, a stepped eaves course and a pantile roof. It has two storeys and is four bays wide. The doorway has a plain surround, the windows are horizontally-sliding sashes, and all the openings have wedge lintels. Inside, there are massive beams, two 19th-century fireplaces, a corner cupboard, a Bible cupboard, and a rear plank door.

== See also ==
- Listed buildings in Gillamoor
