= Listed buildings in Gillamoor =

Gillamoor is a civil parish in the county of North Yorkshire, England. It contains eight listed buildings that are recorded in the National Heritage List for England. All the listed buildings are designated at Grade II, the lowest of the three grades, which is applied to "buildings of national importance and special interest". The parish contains the village of Gillamoor and the surrounding countryside, and the listed buildings consist of a public house, a sundial, a church, a bridge, and a group of farm buildings.

== Buildings ==
Name and location	Photograph	Date	Notes
Royal Oak; 54.30091°N 0.95289°W		Mid 18th century	The public house is in sandstone, with quoins, a stepped eaves course and a pantile roof. There are two storeys and four bays. The doorway has a plain surround, the windows are horizontally-sliding sashes, and all the openings have wedge lintels.
Sundial; 54.30146°N 0.95211°W		1800	The sundial is in an enclosure by the side of the road and is in stone. It has a stepped plinth, on which is a cylindrical pedestal, and a cube surmounted by a sphere on cast iron brackets. On the cube is a cast iron gnomon, and around the top of the pedestal is an inscription. On the sloped top of the cylinder is a Time Equation table, and on the cube are carved dials.
St Aidan's Church; 54.30245°N 0.94990°W		1802	The church was restored in 1882 by Temple Moore, when the tower was replaced by a belfry. It is built in limestone, rendered on the north side, and has a stone flag roof. The church consists of a continuous nave and chancel, and a south porch. At the west end is a square timber belfry with louvred openings, surmounted by a lead broach spire and a weathervane in the form of a fish. The porch is gabled, and has a round-arched opening, above which is a carving in high relief.
Barn and mill southeast of Lowna Farmhouse; 54.30985°N 0.94506°W	—	1803	The mill is the earlier part, with the barn added in about 1840. The buildings are in limestone with quoins, and a roof of pantile and corrugated asbestos. The barn is rectangular, with the mill at right angles to the rear. The barn has two storeys and five bays, and the mill has one storey and a loft, and three bays. In the gable end of the barn is a diamond-shaped compass, and a weathervane in the form of a female figure.
Outbuildings 8 metres east of Lowna Farmhouse; 54.31005°N 0.94496°W		1803	A range containing former drying sheds, byres and loose boxes, the second phase dating from about 1840. It is in limestone with quoins and pantile roofs. There are three storeys, the earlier phase with three bays, and the later phase with five bays and red brick piers. The openings include doorways, windows, some of which are sashes and others with fixed lights, loft openings and lifting doors.
Lowna Bridge; 54.30911°N 0.94497°W		1825	The bridge carries Lund Road over the River Dove. It is in sandstone, and consists of a single elliptical arch of voussoirs. The bridge has plain parapets, with cambered copings swept round at each end to terminate in cylindrical piers with domed caps.
Cowsheds east of Lowna Farmhouse; 54.31006°N 0.94474°W	—	c. 1860	A tanning shed, later a cowshed, in limestone with quoins, the interior wall in red brick, and roofs of pantile and corrugated asbestos. There is a single storey, and three parallel ranges of five bays. The north front contains a wide opening, and on the east side are four small-paned windows.
Outbuilding 30 metres east of Lowna Farmhouse; 54.31021°N 0.94467°W	—	c. 1860	The outbuilding is in limestone, the end wall is faced in red brick, and it has a pantile roof. In the centre are sliding doors under a timber lintel, to the left is a square window with a stone lintel, and at the rear are four blocked windows with timber lintels.
