= Dymock Woods SSSI =

Biological Site of Special Scientific Interest in Gloucestershire, England

Dymock Woods
- Site of Special Scientific Interest
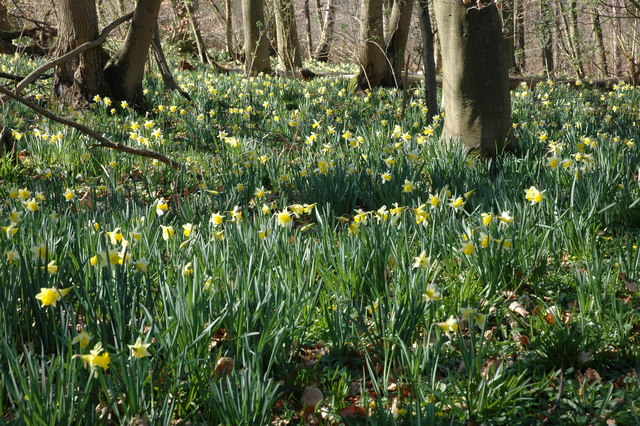
- Wild daffodils at Dymock

- Location within Gloucestershire
- Location of Dymock Woods.
- Area of search: Gloucestershire
- Grid reference: SO684288, SO692290, SO697283
- Coordinates: 51.957°N 2.455°W
- Interest: Biological
- Area: Area: 53 hectare
- Notification date: 1990

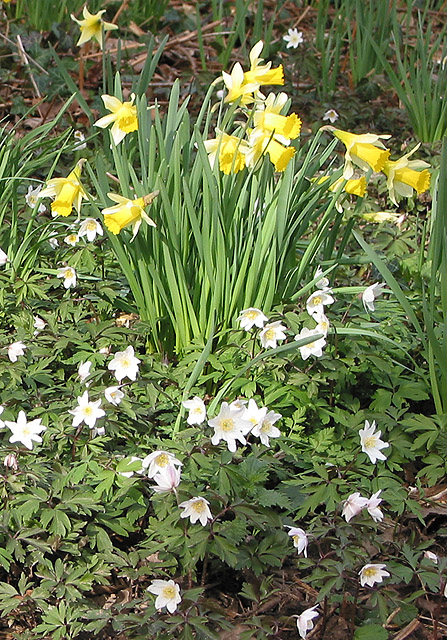
Wild daffodils and wood anemones at Dymock Woods

Dymock Woods (grid reference SO684288, SO692290, SO697283) is a 53-hectare (130-acre) biological Site of Special Scientific Interest in Gloucestershire, notified in 1990. The site is listed in the 'Forest of Dean Local Plan Review' as a Key Wildlife Site (KWS).

The site is divided into three units of assessment and includes the Gloucestershire Wildlife Trust nature reserve known as Betty Daw's Wood which is unit 3.

== Dymock Woods ==
=== Site ===
The Dymock Woods site (comprises Dymock Wood, Daw's coppice, Betty Daw's Wood and Colonel's Grove) is a few miles south-west of Dymock which is in north-west Gloucestershire. The site has the best areas of mature sessile oak which remain in Dymock Forest. These sessile oak plantations have developed a high forest structure. Dymock Forest is important for invertebrates such as moths and butterflies. The woods are on draining acidic soils which are derived from Old Red Sandstone. Streams cut through this sandstone to the underlying Silurian rocks.

=== Trees ===
The woodland (acidic areas) is dominated by sessile oak with silver birch and wild cherry. Wild service-tree is found throughout the site. The understorey is mostly hazel with hawthorn and holly. The woodland along the streams is mostly sessile oak and, locally, alder. Small-leaved lime and ash may be found. The understory is mostly hazel, and wild privet and dogwood may be found.

=== Ground flora ===
The ground flora is mostly bramble and bracken. Typical woodland species such as bluebell, wood anemone and yellow archangel flower, together with heather, bilberry and common cow-wheat. The ground flora along the streams is mostly dog's mercury with woodruff and sanicle.

Wild daffodil (Narcissus pseudonarcissus) is a particular feature of the woods in early spring. Other locally uncommon species include bitter-vetch, tutsan and lily-of-the-valley.

=== Invertebrates ===
Dymock Forest is important for butterflies and moths. The pearl-bordered fritillary and wood white occur as well as the uncommon white admiral. Other recordings include great oak beauty and satin lutestring. Other scarce moths are associated with particular woodland herbs.

== Betty Daw's Wood ==
Betty Daw's is part of Dymock Woods, Gloucestershire
- Natural England information on Betty Daw's Wood

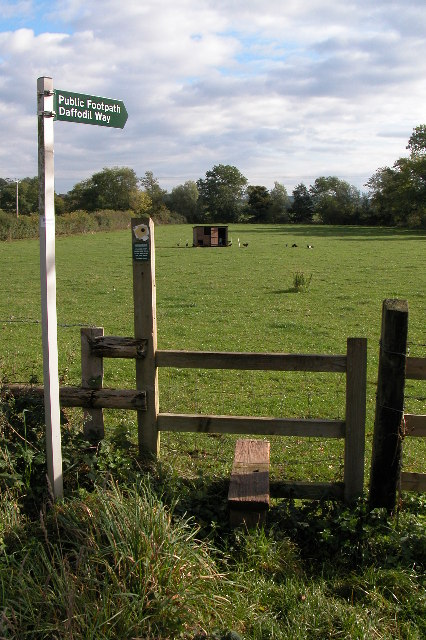
Daffodil Way Trail

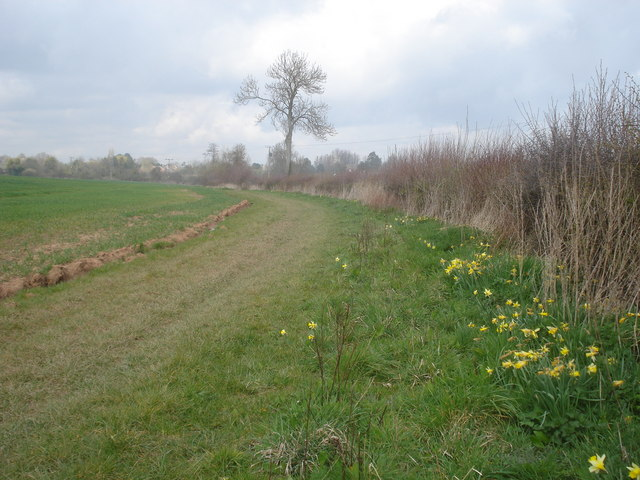
Daffodil Way approaching Dymock

=== Site ===
Betty Daw's Wood lies two miles north-east of Newent, has been unaffected by conifer planting and remains entirely 'semi—natural'. It was taken into Crown ownership at the outbreak of the First World War and has been managed by the Forestry Commission (now Forestry England) since 1919. The wood, including an area called Colonel's Grove to the east, has been a Gloucestershire Wildlife Trust reserve since 1967. The wood was originally managed as coppice for charcoal, and became high forest, with sessile oak, in the 1850s.

=== Trees ===
The large sessile oaks date from about 1850. Those in Colonel's Grove were felled in 1920, and this part of the wood was replanted with ash and beech. Also present are wild cherry and wild service-tree and small-leaved lime. The shrub layer is mostly hazel coppice.

=== Ground flora ===
The wood is particularly known for its flowering of wild daffodils, and forms part of the Wild Daffodil Trail, which offers two particular walks that incorporate a number of sites which have spectacular displays of wild daffodils. The walks incorporate a series of smaller nature reserves including Gwen and Vera's Fields, Ketford Bank and Vell Mill Daffodil Meadow. The ground flora is diverse and includes wood anemone, bitter-vetch, wood-sorrel, bluebell and primrose.

=== Nest box scheme ===
A nest box scheme which was started by the North Gloucestershire Naturalists' Society in 1964, has supported the breeding birds. This one of the longest running schemes in Gloucestershire. Recordings show that these have been used by pied flycatcher, spotted flycatcher, nuthatch, wren, treecreeper and marsh tit in particular. Other breeding birds includes dunnock, song thrush and garden warbler. Nightingales can be heard in the wood.

=== Mammals and invertebrates ===
The hazel coppice provides a good habitat for the common dormouse. Woodland butterflies include white admiral, wood white and silver-washed fritillary.

=== Conservation ===
Work is done by Forestry England and the Gloucestershire Wildlife Trust and includes path and ride-widening, coppicing, tree-planting and pond-clearance. Necessary tree thinning is done of the sessile oak, ash and beech.

== Publications ==
- Kelham, A, Sanderson, J, Doe, J, Edgeley-Smith, M, et al., 1979, 1990, 2002 editions, 'Nature Reserves of the Gloucestershire Trust for Nature Conservation/Gloucestershire Wildlife Trust'
- 'The Daffodil Trails', (undated), Gloucestershire Wildlife Trust

== SSSI source ==
- Natural England SSSI information on the citation
- Natural England SSSI information on the Dymock Woods units
