= St Mary's Church, Farndale =

Church in Farndale East, North Yorkshire, England

Coordinates: 54°22′10″N 0°57′59″W

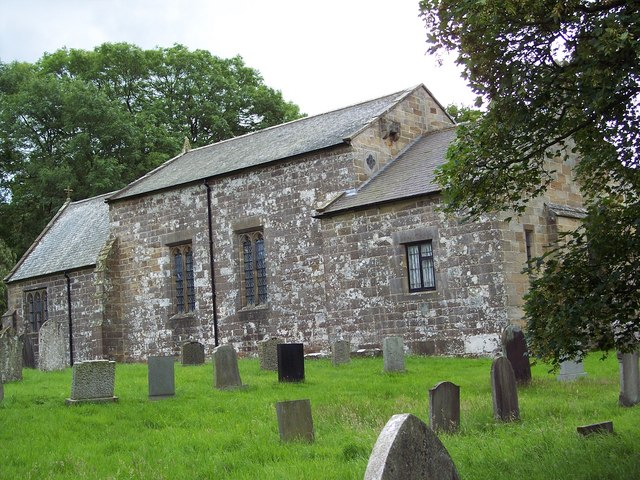
The church, in 2007

St Mary's Church is an Anglican church in Farndale East, a civil parish in North Yorkshire, in England.

The church was built near to the hamlet now known as Church Houses, to a design by William Stonehouse, and was completed in 1831. Between 1907 and 1914, it was restored by Temple Moore, who also added a baptistry and a new west front. The church was Grade II listed in 1955.

The church is built of sandstone with a slate roof. It consists of a west baptistry, vestry and porch, a five-bay nave and a chancel. On the west gable is a bellcote with angle turrets and pyramidal caps. Inside, the nave has a king post roof, and the chancel has a barrel vault.

== See also ==
- Listed buildings in Farndale East
