= St Aidan's Church, Gillamoor =

Church in Gillamoor, North Yorkshire, England

Coordinates: 54°18′09″N 0°57′00″W

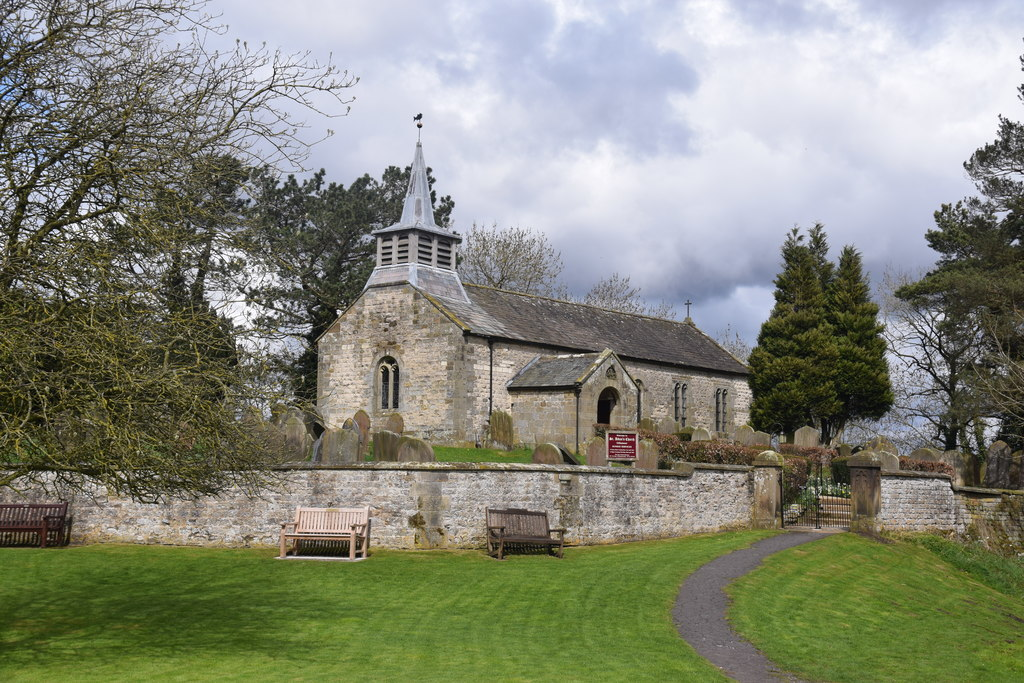
The church, in 2018

St Aidan's Church is an Anglican church in Gillamoor, a village in North Yorkshire, in England.

A church was built in Gillamoor in the 12th century. In 1802, it was entirely rebuilt by the local stonemason James Smith, using stone from a redundant church in Bransdale. The church was restored in 1880, from which time most of the details date. In 1902, it was again restored, this time by Temple Moore, replacing the tower with a belfry. It was grade II listed in 1955.

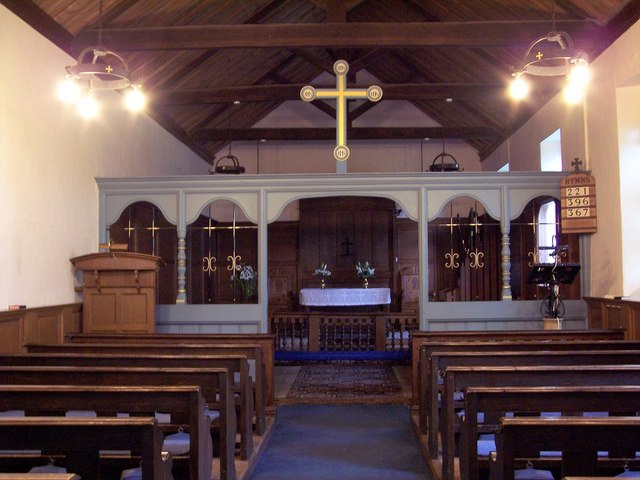
View from the nave into the chancel

The church is built in limestone, rendered on the north side, and has a stone flag roof. It consists of a continuous nave and chancel, and a south porch. At the west end is a square timber belfry with louvred openings, surmounted by a lead broach spire and a weathervane in the form of a fish. The porch is gabled, and has a round-arched opening, above which is a carving in high relief. Inside, there is a plain 12th-century font, a 17th-century communion table, a communion rail dating from about 1700, and a west screen incorporating a rail dating from 1682.

== See also ==
- Listed buildings in Gillamoor
