= Duck House, Farndale East =

House in Farndale East, North Yorkshire, England

Duck House
- Interactive map of the Duck House area

General information
- Type: Farmhouse
- Architectural style: Vernacular North York Moors sandstone
- Location: Farndale East, North Yorkshire, England
- Coordinates: 54.3425°N 0.95088°W
- Grid position: SE 6830 9462
- Construction started: Mid-18th century
- Owner: Private

Technical details
- Material: Sandstone ashlar, pantile roof
- Size: Two storeys, two bays

Listed Building – Grade II
- Designated: 8 March 1989
- Reference no.: 1316011

Duck House is a Grade II listed mid-18th-century farmhouse located in Farndale East, within the North York Moors National Park, North Yorkshire, England.

== History & Architecture ==
The house was built in about 1520, probably by the mason named either John, or Thomas, Duck. The Duck family lived in the property until 1750, making only limited alterations. It was extended and altered in the 19th century, and then in 1957 it was modernised, the roof was partly raised, and the thatch roof was replaced with shingles. The farmhouse is constructed from herringbone-tooled sandstone ashlar under a traditional red pantile roof.

Originally a longhouse, the low end converted for domestic use, it is partly cruck-framed and encased in limestone, and has a roof of cedar shingle. The high end has a single storey and an attic, and three bays, and the low end to the right has two storeys and three bays. The doorway has a chamfered surround, and a shallow Tudor arched head. In the high end is a two-light mullioned window and a fire window, elsewhere are casement windows, and dormers in the attic. Inside the attic are two pairs of full crucks, and in the ground floor is an inglenook fireplace.

Key architectural details include the decorative herringbone-tooled stonework across the principal front elevation, characteristic of 18th-century Farndale masonry. Multi-pane sash windows set within squared stone surrounds, alongside a ground-floor fire-window on the left. It has retained significant 18th-century interior features, including plain ceiling joists, a chamfered bressumer beam over the principal hearth, and an intact timber roof frame.

Duck House was designated as a Grade II listed building on 8 March 1989 under NHLE entry 1316011 for its exceptional retention of 18th-century vernacular features.

== Location ==
The house sits on the eastern slopes of Farndale, east of the River Dove, positioned along the historical agricultural tracks connecting the dale's hillside farmsteads.

== See also ==
- Grade II* listed buildings in North Yorkshire (district)
- Listed buildings in Farndale East
