= Gillamoor =

Village and civil parish in North Yorkshire, England

Coordinates: 54°18′04″N 0°57′10″W

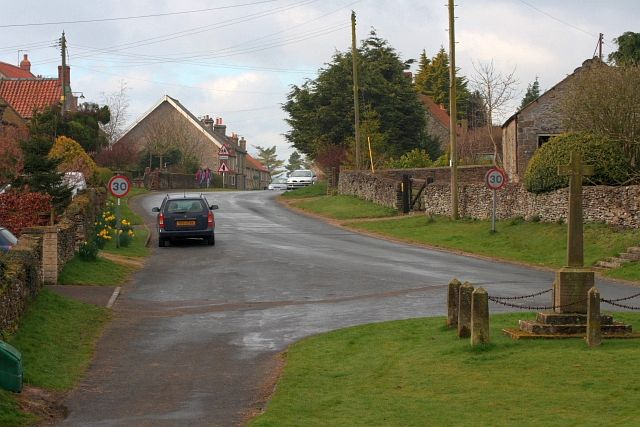
- The High Street in Gillamoor

- Location within North Yorkshire
- Population: 156 (2011 Census)
- Civil parish: Gillamoor
- Unitary authority: North Yorkshire
- Ceremonial county: North Yorkshire
- Region: Yorkshire and the Humber
- Country: England
- Sovereign state: United Kingdom
- Post town: YORK
- Postcode district: YO62
- Dialling code: 01751
- Police: North Yorkshire
- Fire: North Yorkshire
- Ambulance: Yorkshire
- UK Parliament: Thirsk and Malton

Gillamoor is a village and civil parish in the county of North Yorkshire, England. It is situated about 3 miles (5 km) north of Kirkbymoorside on the edge of the North York Moors National Park. The population of the parish as taken at the 2001 census was 168, dropping to 156 at the 2011 census was 156. In 2015, North Yorkshire County Council estimated the population of the parish to be 150 people.

From 1974 to 2023 it was part of the district of Ryedale. It is now administered by the unitary North Yorkshire Council.

== History ==
The village is mentioned in the Domesday Book as having 15 villagers and seven ploughlands. The name derives from Old English Getla's inga mōr; the moor of Getla's people (Getla being a personal name). In the 12th and 13th centuries, the spelling of the village was Gillemore.

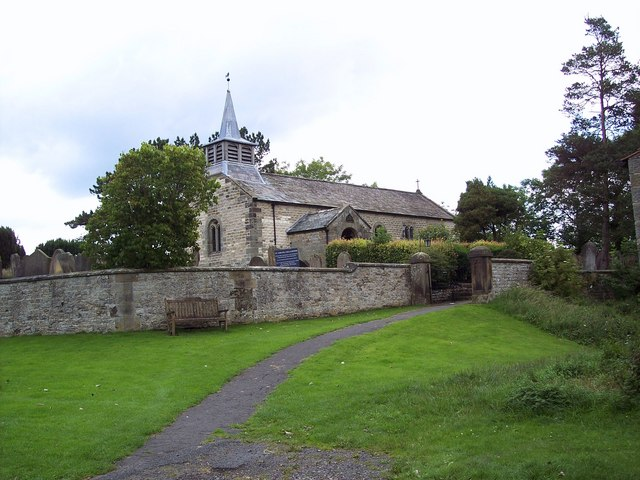
St. Aidan's church

In the 18th, 19th and 20th centuries, Gillamoor had water delivered via a channel cut by Joseph Foord. He created many miles of gently sloping leats that carried water from the moors into Fadmoor, Gillamoor and Kirkbymoorside. In 2000, the natural spring in the village was abandoned for a cut into the aquifer under the Vale of Pickering for fresh water.

Gillamoor is well known for its 'Surprise View'. At its eastern end, the road turns sharply to reveal an enchanting view of the eastern entrance to Farndale. The church wall plaque, close-by, reads:

Thou, who hast given me eyes to see and love this sight so fair, give me a heart to find out thee, and read thee everywhere.

The little church was rebuilt single-handedly in 1802 by James Smith of Farndale. The interior of St Aidan's Church, Gillamoor includes items from an earlier church, such as a balustrade that dates to 1682. The church was renovated again in 1880 and is now a grade II listed structure. A most unusual, complex, four-faced sundial stands by the roadside in the centre of the village. Like the church, this is now a grade II listed structure.

Apart from the Royal Oak pub, the church, and the school, all buildings in the village are residential. Most of the village is within the boundaries of the North York Moors National Park. The former Wesleyan chapel in the village is now used as the school.

== See also ==
- Listed buildings in Gillamoor
