= Listed buildings in Farndale West =

Farndale West is a civil parish in the county of North Yorkshire, England. It contains 13 listed buildings that are recorded in the National Heritage List for England. All the listed buildings are designated at Grade II, the lowest of the three grades, which is applied to "buildings of national importance and special interest". The only settlement in the parish is Low Mill, the rest of it consisting of countryside and moorland. Most of the listed buildings are houses, farmhouses and farm buildings, and the others include a standing stone and a bridge.

== Buildings ==
Name and location	Photograph	Date	Notes
Cammon Stone; 54.39000°N 1.03472°W		Bronze Age	A standing stone consisting of a roughly pointed monolith about 1.6 metres (5 ft 3 in) high. There is a cleft in the centre, and cup and ring marks on the south side.
Mill Farmhouse, cottage and outbuildings 54.34802°N 0.96683°W		Mid 18th century	A group of buildings in sandstone, with pantile roofs, coped gables and shaped kneelers, used for various purposes. They are in one and two storeys, and the windows are a mix, with sashes, some horizontally-sliding, casements, and fixed lights. In front of the buildings, is a mounting block.
Ewe Hill; 54.38559°N 1.01408°W	—	1750	A farmhouse that was extended in the 19th century, later a private house, it is in gritstone, and has a pantile roof with coped gables and bold kneelers. There are two storeys, and the original part and the extension each has two bays. The windows are sashes, and to the right of the front door is a stone trough and a moulded slop stone.
Horn End House; 54.35142°N 0.97838°W		Late 18th century	The house is in sandstone, with a console cornice, and a pantile roof with coped gables and shaped kneelers. There are two storeys, a main block of three bays, a lower three-bay extension on the left, and a low recessed single bay on the right. The windows are a mix of sashes and casements.
The Square; 54.34744°N 0.96687°W	—	1778	A miller's house later divided into two, in sandstone, with a pantile roof, coped gables and shaped kneelers. There are two storeys and extensions to the left, right and the rear. On the front is a gabled porch containing a round-arched doorway with a blind fanlight, above which is a datestone with initials and carved shells. The windows are sashes, some horizontally-sliding.
Three Tuns; 54.34458°N 0.97162°W		c. 1820	A public house, later a private house, in sandstone, with a pantile roof, coped gables and shaped kneelers. There are two storeys and two bays. In the centre is a doorway, the windows are casements, and the ground floor openings have heavy tooled lintels.
Farm buildings southeast of Hazel House; 54.36093°N 0.97678°W		1824	The farm buildings consist of single-storey loose boxes, a cart shed with two storeys and a loft, a stable, and pigsties with a hen house above. They are in sandstone with pantile roofs and coped gables. The openings include a segmental cart arch with voussoirs on imposts, stable doors, and square window openings. In the centre is a datestone, and on the right gable end are stone steps leading to the hen house, with a kennel beneath.
Cart shed south of Horn End House; 54.35093°N 0.97825°W	—	Early 19th century	The cart shed is in sandstone, and has a pantile roof with coped gables. There is a single storey and a loft, and a front of two bays. On the front are paired segmental arches with tooled shaped voussoirs, and in the loft are square pitching holes. On the right end are stone steps leading to a loft door, with a dog kennel beneath.
Farm buildings south of Horn End House; 54.35112°N 0.97845°W	—	Early 19th century	The farm buildings consist of byres, loose boxes and a gin-gang. They are in sandstone, and have pantile roofs with coped gables and shaped kneelers. There is a two-storey six-bay range, and a projecting two-storey wing on the left. The building contains stable doors and square pitching holes.
Low Mill Bridge; 54.34764°N 0.96648°W	—	Early 19th century	The bridge carries Daleside Road over West Gill Beck. It is in limestone, and consists of a single semicircular arch with voussoirs. Above it is a raised band, and a plain parapet with cambered coping.
Frost Hall Farmhouse; 54.38092°N 1.00972°W		1826	The farmhouse is in stone, and has a pantile roof with coped gables. There are two storeys, two bays, and a rear service wing. The doorway is in the centre, above it is a datestone, and the windows date from the 20th century.
Farm buildings one metre north-west of Frost Hall Farmhouse; 54.38109°N 1.01011°W		c. 1826	The farm buildings consist of loose boxes, byres and a cart shed. They are in stone with stepped eaves, and a pantile roof with coped gables and plain kneelers. There is one storey and lofts, a front of seven bays, and a single-bay extension on the left. The range contains a segmental cart arch with shaped tooled voussoirs, stable doors and square loft openings. On the left end are stone steps leading to a loft door, with a dog kennel beneath.
Barn and farm buildings 95 metres north-west of Frost Hall Farmhouse; 54.38119°N 1.01047°W		Undated	The farm buildings consist of a threshing barn, and a gin-gang at the rear. They are in sandstone with a stepped eaves course, and pantile roofs with coped gables and kneelers. There is one storey and a loft, and an L-shaped plan, with a front range of three bays, and a single-storey lean-to on the left. On the front is a semicircular cart arch with voussoirs, a stable door and square pitching holes.
