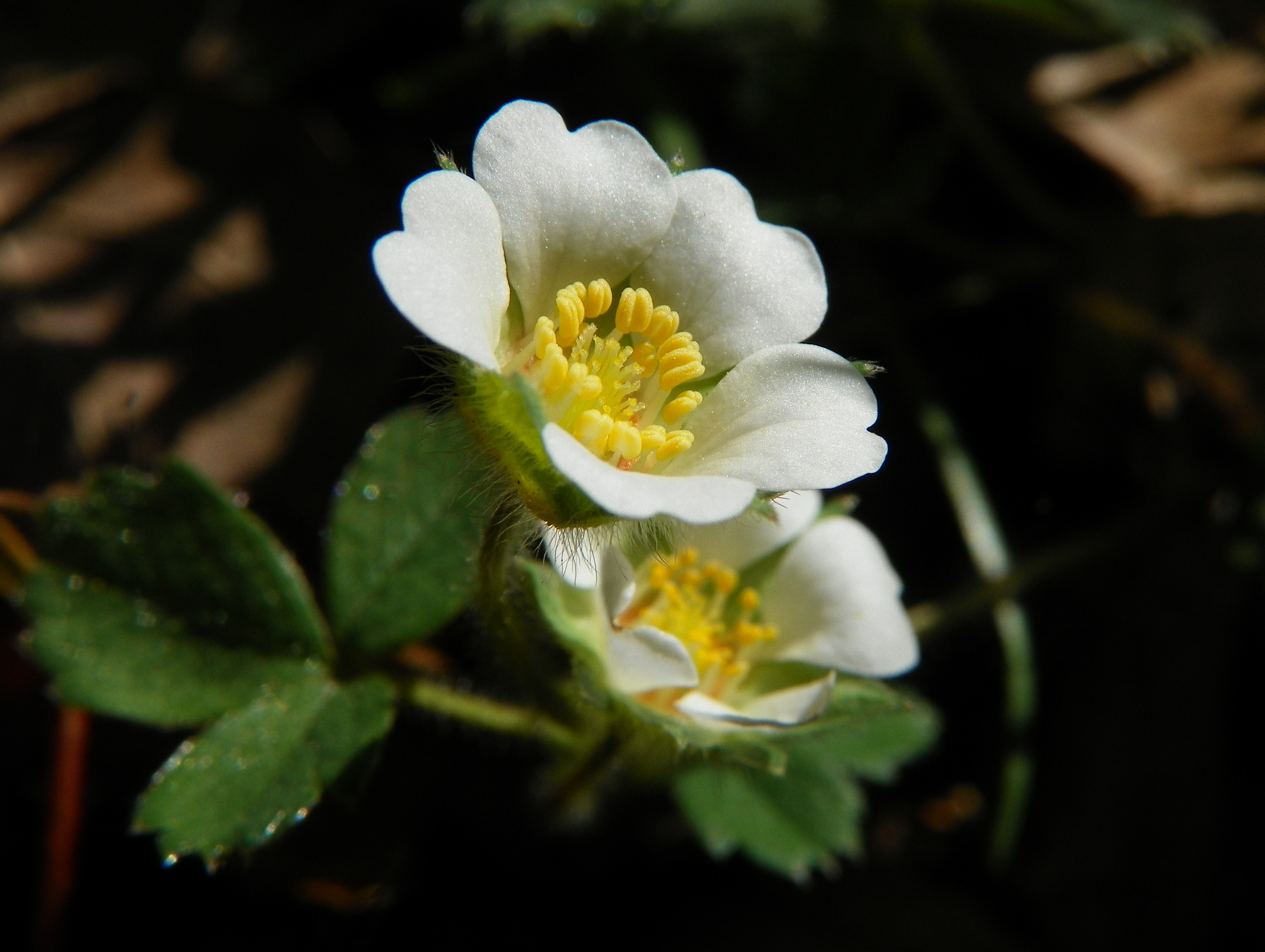

Scientific classification
- Kingdom: Plantae
- Clade: Embryophytes
- Clade: Tracheophytes
- Clade: Angiosperms
- Clade: Eudicots
- Clade: Rosids
- Order: Rosales
- Family: Rosaceae
- Genus: Potentilla
- Species: P. sterilis

Binomial name
- Potentilla sterilis (L.) Garcke

Synonyms
- P. fragariastrum Ehrh. ex Pers.

= Potentilla sterilis =

Species of flowering plant in the rose family

Potentilla sterilis, also called strawberryleaf cinquefoil or barren strawberry, is a perennial herbaceous species of flowering plant in the rose family, Rosaceae. It is native to Europe.

== Description ==
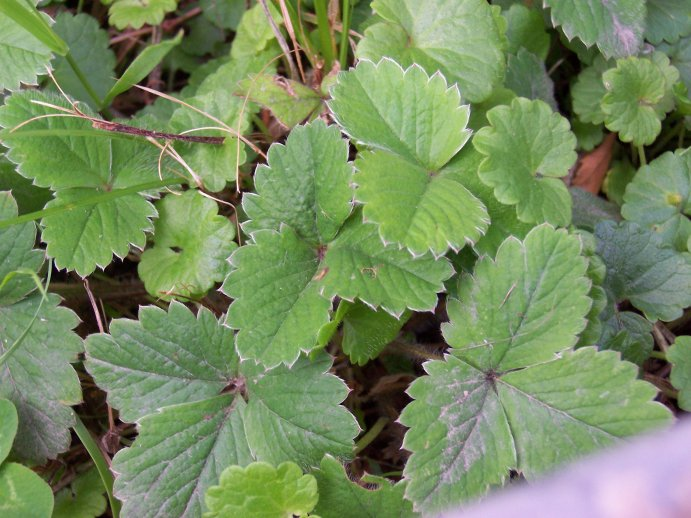
Leaves resemble those of strawberries.

The plant looks rather like wild woodland strawberry (Fragaria vesca), or a cultivated strawberry, but is a smaller plant, with smaller flowers, and it does not form fleshy fruit. After the petals have fallen from a flower no obvious fruit forms. The petals are usually well separated from one another, not overlapping as in Fragaria vesca. Another distinguishing feature, illustrated in the photograph at left, is that the terminal tooth of the leaflets is usually shorter than the adjacent teeth and the leaves are matte and darker green.
