= Listed buildings in Farndale East =

Farndale East is a civil parish in the county of North Yorkshire, England. It contains 18 listed buildings that are recorded in the National Heritage List for England. Of these, one is listed at Grade II*, the middle of the three grades, and the others are at Grade II, the lowest grade. The parish does not contain any settlements of significant size, and consists mainly of countryside and moorland. Most of the listed buildings are farmhouses and farm buildings, and the others include guidestones, boundary stones, a bridge, a former watermill, a church and a former school.

== Key ==
Grade	Criteria
II*	Particularly important buildings of more than special interest
II	Buildings of national importance and special interest

== Buildings ==
Name and location	Photograph	Date	Notes	Grade
Duck House; 54.34256°N 0.95088°W	—	16th to 17th century	Originally a longhouse, the low end converted for domestic use, it is partly cruck-framed and encased in limestone, and has a roof of cedar shingle. The high end has a single storey and an attic, and three bays, and the low end to the right has two storeys and three bays. The doorway has a chamfered surround, and a shallow Tudor arched head. In the high end is a two-light mullioned window and a fire window, elsewhere are casement windows, and dormers in the attic. Inside the attic are two pairs of full crucks, and in the ground floor is an inglenook fireplace.	II*
Guidestone, Blakey Ridge; 54.40183°N 0.96158°W		c. 1720	The guidestone is in sandstone, and consists of a roughly squared stone about 0.75 metres (2 ft 6 in) high. The south face is inscribed "F R O END".	II
Guidestone, Blakey Road; 54.32392°N 0.93499°W		c. 1720	The guidestone is in sandstone, and consists of a roughly rectangular monolith about 1.56 metres (5 ft 1 in) high. There are inscriptions on all four faces.	II
Boundary stone, Blakey Howe; 54.38902°N 0.95647°W		Early 18th century (probable)	The boundary stone is in sandstone, and is a monolith with a ridge-shaped top about 1.4 metres (4 ft 7 in) high. The west face is inscribed with "T D".	II
Boundary stone, Blakey Ridge; 54.39819°N 0.96033°W		Early 18th century (probable)	The boundary stone is in sandstone, and is a monolith about 2 metres (6 ft 7 in) high. The west face is inscribed with "T D".	II
Hollins Farmhouse; 54.37693°N 0.98440°W	—	Early 18th century	The farmhouse, which was extended in 1824, is in sandstone, the original part with a corrugated asbestos roof, and the extension with a pantile roof and a coped gable on the left. There are two storeys, the original part with two bays, and the extension to the left, taller also with two bays. The doorway has a heavy lintel with an inscription and a date, and it is flanked by carved stones. The windows are sashes, some horizontally-sliding. Inside, there is an inglenook fireplace.	II
Barn and stable, Church Houses Farm; 54.36905°N 0.97076°W		Late 18th century	The barn and stables are in stone, with pantile roofs and stone coped gables. They form a T-shaped plan, with the stable running at right angles to the barn. The building contains doorways, stable doors, a loft door, feeding slots and vents.	II
Coach house, Church Houses Farm; 54.36896°N 0.97102°W	—	Late 18th century	The coach house and attached stable are in stone and have pantile roofs with stone coped gables. The openings include a carriage arch with rusticated voussoirs and double doors, stable doors, small windows and a vent.	II
Elm Farmhouse and cart shed 54.39451°N 1.01331°W	—	c. 1825	The farmhouse and attached cart shed are in sandstone, and have a pantile roof with coped gables. The farmhouse has two storeys and three bays, and contains a doorway, the cart shed has a loft, and contains a segmental arch with voussoirs and a datestone. Both parts have horizontally-sliding sash windows with tooled heavy lintels.	II
Farm building northwest of Hollins Farmhouse; 54.37695°N 0.98465°W		1825 (probable)	A cowhouse with a loft, it is in sandstone with a pantile roof. There are two storeys and a single bay. In the ground floor is a stable door, and above is a square lifting hole.	II
Farm buildings southwest of Hollins Farmhouse; 54.37673°N 0.98445°W		1825	The farm buildings consist of a cart shed, pigsties, a stable and cowsheds with lofts above. They are in two storeys with five bays, and a single-storey lean-to on the left. They contain a segmental cart arch with shaped voussoirs, a datestone, doorways and loft openings. The pigsty has three feeding troughs, and in the gable end is a pigeoncote with a landing platform.	II
Lowna Bridge; 54.30911°N 0.94501°W		1825	The bridge carries Lund Road over the River Dove. It is in sandstone, and consists of a single elliptical arch with voussoirs. The bridge has a plain parapet with cambered copings, swept round at the ends and terminating in cylindrical piers with domed caps.	II
Church Houses Farmhouse; 54.36883°N 0.97085°W		Early 19th century	The farmhouse is in stone, and has a pantile roof with coped gables. There are two storeys and two bays. On the front is a doorway and horizontally-sliding sash windows, and in the right return is a cast iron letter box. At the rear is a blocked doorway and casement windows, and a single-storey outbuilding.	II
Kennels, Church Houses Farm; 54.36892°N 0.97080°W	—	Early 19th century	The kennels are in stone, and have a single-pitch pantile roof with stone coping. On the front are four plank doors with stone lintels.	II
Stable range, Church Houses Farm; 54.36908°N 0.97104°W	—	Early 19th century	The stable range is in stone, and has a pantile roof with raised gable copings. On the front are two stable doors, a cart entrance with double doors, and a stable entrance.	II
High Mill and Mill House; 54.36466°N 0.97322°W		Early 19th century	The former watermill and attached house are in stone, and have a pantile roof with stone coping. The mill building has three storeys at the front and two at the rear, and two wide bays, and the house to the left has two storeys and two bays. The house has a central doorway and casement windows. At the southeast is a single-storey extension.	II
St Mary's Church; 54.36938°N 0.96624°W		1831	The church, which was altered by Temple Moore in 1907–09 and in 1922, is in sandstone with a slate roof. It consists of a west baptistry, vestry and porch, a nave and a chancel. On the west gable is a bellcote with angle turrets and pyramidal caps.	II
The Old School House; 54.36816°N 0.96459°W		1833	The former school is in stone, and has a slate roof with stone coped gables. There is a single storey and three bays. On the front is a gabled porch with a doorway on the left, over which is a carved coat of arms. The windows are casements, with chamfered surrounds and hood moulds. At the rear is a small outbuilding with a pantile roof.	II
