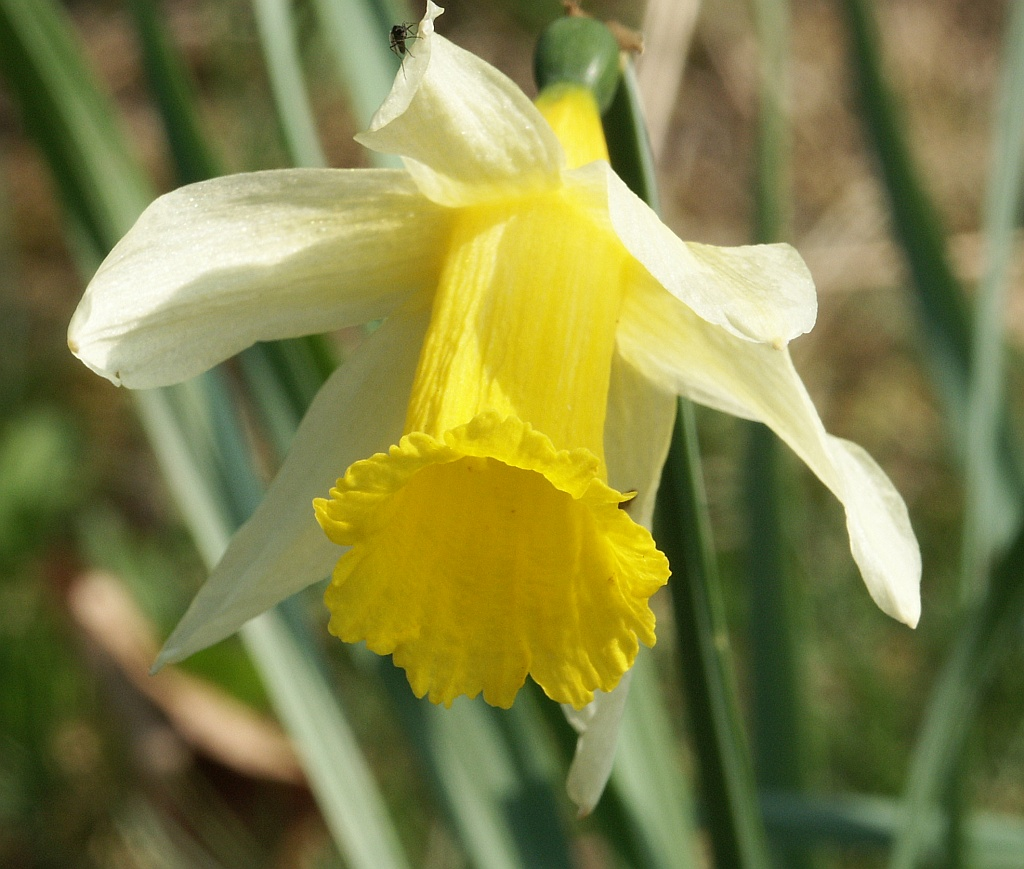

Scientific classification
- Kingdom: Plantae
- Clade: Tracheophytes
- Clade: Angiosperms
- Clade: Monocots
- Order: Asparagales
- Family: Amaryllidaceae
- Subfamily: Amaryllidoideae
- Genus: Narcissus
- Species: N. pseudonarcissus

Binomial name
- Narcissus pseudonarcissus L.

Synonyms
- See text

= Narcissus pseudonarcissus =

Wild daffodil or Lent lily

Species of plant

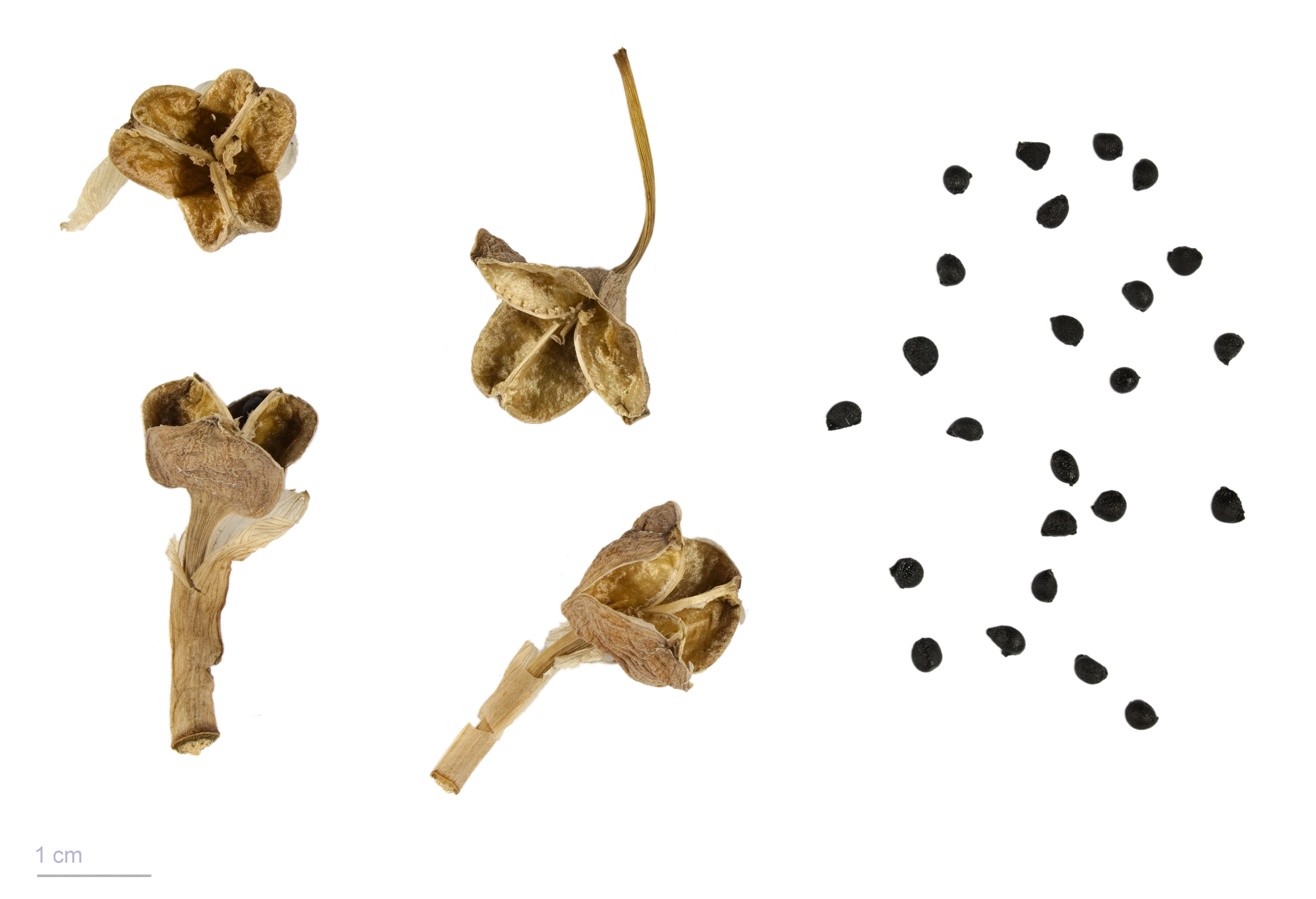
N. pseudonarcissus - MHNT

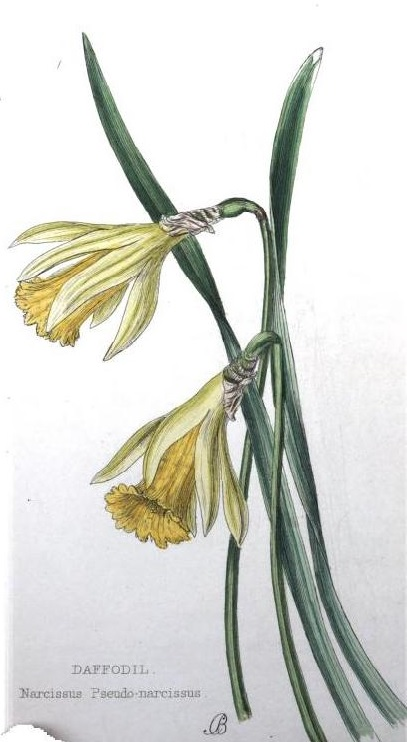
N. pseudonarcissus, from Lady Wilkinson's Weeds and wild flowers 1858

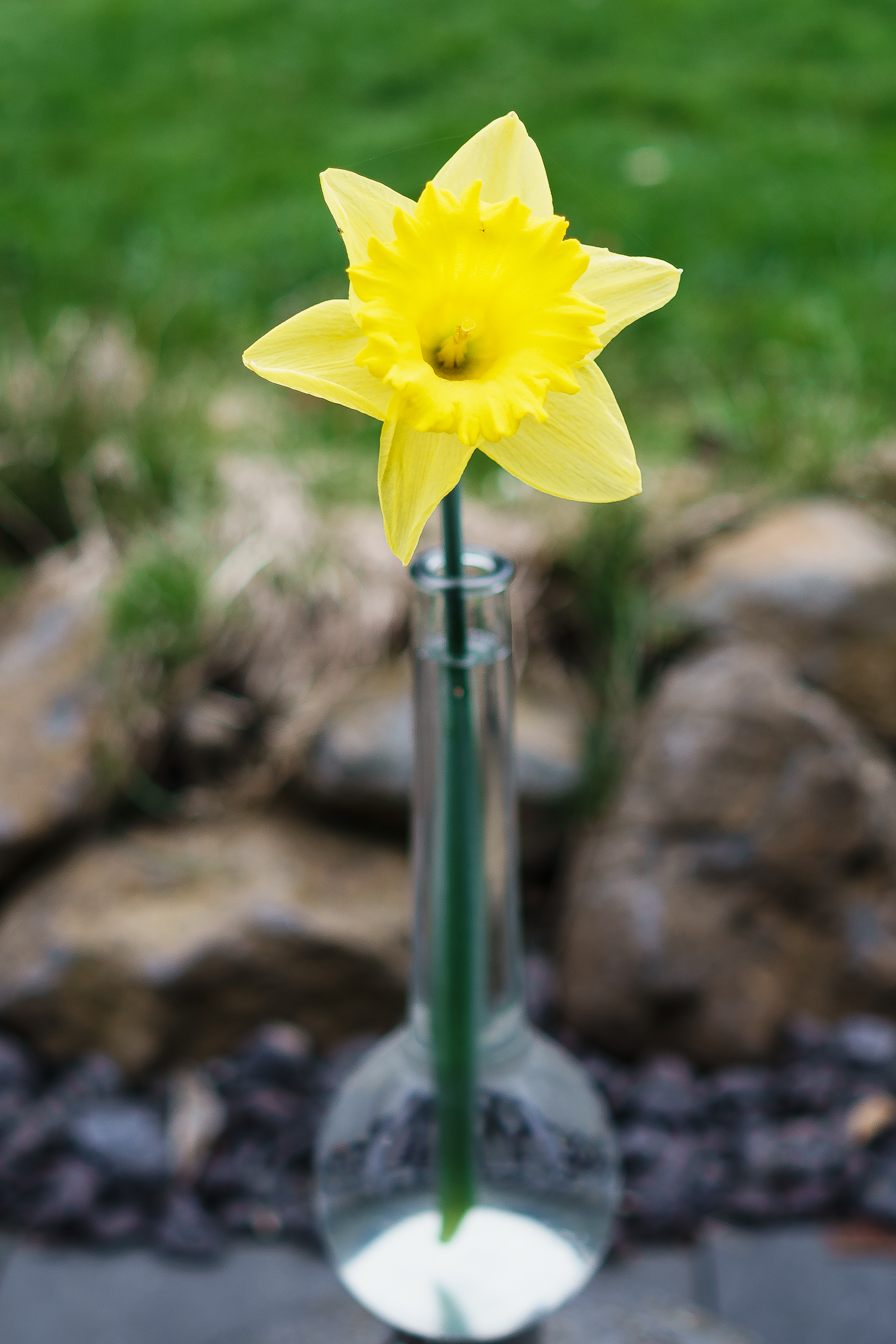
Narcissus as Cut flower

Narcissus pseudonarcissus, commonly named the wild daffodil or Lent lily (Welsh: Cennin Pedr), is a perennial flowering plant.

This species has pale yellow tepals, with a darker central trumpet. The long, narrow leaves are slightly greyish green in colour and rise from the base of the stem. The plant grows from a bulb. The flowers produce seeds which, when germinated, take five to seven years to produce a flowering plant. (Sexual seed reproduction mixes the traits of both parent flowers, so if garden hybrid cultivars are planted close to wild populations of Narcissus pseudonarcissus, there is a danger that the new seedlings, having hybrid vigour, could out-compete the wild plants.)

== Distribution ==
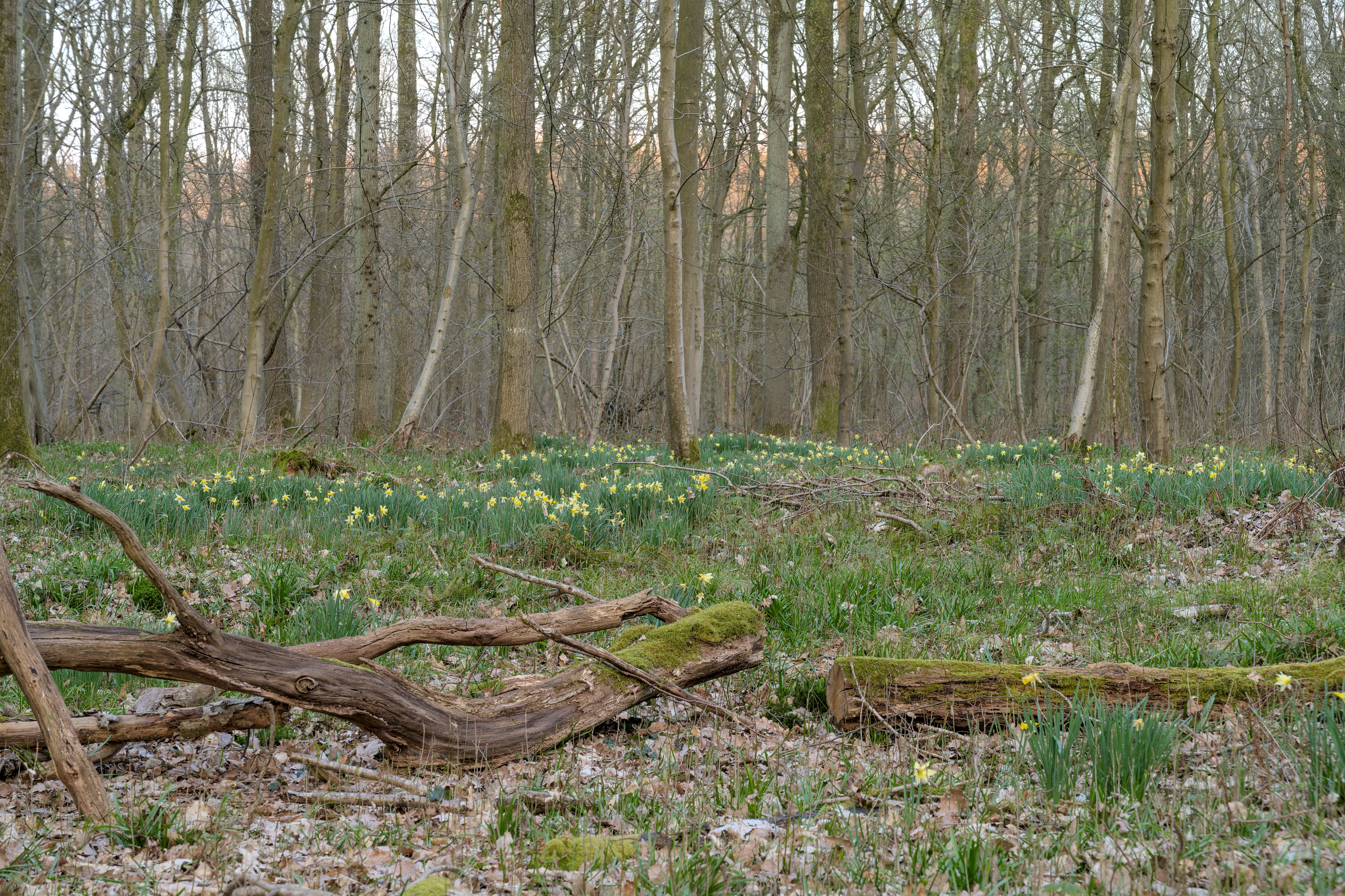
Narcissus pseudonarcissus growing in Hallerbos (Belgium)

The species is native to Western Europe from Spain and Portugal east to Germany and north to England and Wales. It is commonly grown in gardens and populations have become established in the Balkans, Australia, New Zealand, the Caucasus, Madeira, British Columbia, Ontario, Newfoundland, Nova Scotia, Oregon, Washington state, much of the eastern United States, and the Falkland Islands. Wild plants grow in woods, grassland and on rocky ground. In Britain native populations have decreased substantially since the 19th century due to intensification of agriculture, clearance of woodland and uprooting of the bulbs for use in gardens. In Germany it was a subject of a national awareness campaign for the protection of wildflowers in 1981.

In England, the Farndale valley in the North York Moors National Park hosts a large population of the species, along the banks of the River Dove. There are several nature reserves in Gloucestershire supporting large populations of the species near Dymock Woods SSSI. There is a Daffodil Walk Trail around several reserves in the spring. In addition, various cultivars of N. pseudonarcissus have escaped and become naturalised across the United Kingdom, and can often be found growing on roadsides, in parks, along streams and in areas where bulbs have been deposited alongside other organic material removed from gardens.

== Taxonomy ==
=== Synonyms ===
The history of N. pseudonarcissus has generated a large number of synonyms, including:

Synonym list
Ajax breviflos Haw.
Ajax cambricus Haw.
Ajax capax M.Roem.
Ajax cernuus Haw.
Ajax cuneifolius Haw.
Ajax fenestralis Gray
Ajax festalis (Salisb.) Salisb.
Ajax festinus Jord.
Ajax gayi Hénon
Ajax hexangularis (Haw.) Herb.
Ajax lobularis Haw.
Ajax montinus Jord.
Ajax multicus J.Gay
Ajax platylobus Jord.
Ajax porrigens Jord.
Ajax praelongus Jord.
Ajax pseudonarcissus (L.) Haw.
Ajax pygmaeus M.Roem.
Ajax radians M.Roem.
Ajax rudbeckii M.Roem.
Ajax sabiniamus Herb.
Ajax serratus (Haw.) Haw.
Ajax serratus var. suavis Haw.
Ajax sexangularis M.Roem.
Ajax telamonius Haw.
Ajax telamonius var. grandiplenus Haw.
Ajax telamonius var. plenus Haw.
Ganymedes cernuus Haw.
Narcissus ajax Sweet
Narcissus andersonii Sabine ex M.Roem.
Narcissus breviflos (Haw.) Steud.
Narcissus festalis Salisb.
Narcissus gayi (Hénon) Pugsley
Narcissus gayi var. praelongus (Jord.) Pugsley
Narcissus glaucus Hornem.
Narcissus horsfeldii Burb.
Narcissus luteus Bubani
Narcissus pisanus Pugsley
Narcissus radians Lapeyr.
Narcissus renaudii Bavoux.
Narcissus serratus Haw.
Narcissus sylvestris Lam.
Narcissus telamonius (Haw.) Link
Oileus hexangularis Haw.

=== Subspecies ===
There are a number of subspecies of the wild daffodil but the exact number varies according to different authors. The large number of cultivars adds to the difficulty of classification. Among the subspecies is the Tenby daffodil (N. pseudonarcissus ssp. obvallaris, sometimes classed as a separate species), which probably originated in cultivation but now grows wild in southwest Wales. Many of the subspecies listed below are currently considered as species by the Royal Horticultural Society, the International Cultivar Registration Authority for daffodils. Those marked agm are recipients of the RHS Award of Garden Merit.

- ssp. pseudonarcissus agm Narcissus pseudonarcissus subsp. pseudonarcissus – Lent lily, wild daffodil – England and Wales
- ssp. bicolor (syn. N. bicolor L.)
- ssp. calcicarpetanus Fernández Casas
- ssp. eugeniae – Central Spain (syn. N. eugeniae Fernández Casas)
- ssp. major – Spanish daffodil, great daffodil – Iberia (syn. N. hispanicus Gouan.)
- ssp. moschatus (L.) Baker agm – swan's-neck daffodil (syn. ssp. candidissimus Desf.; syn. N. moschatus L., N. alpestris Pugsley.)
- ssp. munozii-garmendiae Fernández Casas
- ssp. nevadensis – Iberia (syn. N. nevadensis Pugsley)
- ssp. nobilis – (syn. N. nobilis (Haw.) Schult. & Schult.f.) large flower daffodil – Iberia. The largest floral diameter of Narcissus, at over 12.5 cm
- ssp. obvallaris agm – Tenby daffodil – southern Wales (syn. N. obvallaris, Salisb., sometimes considered to be derived from relict cultivation of ssp. major [1])
- ssp. pallidiflorus – pale flower daffodil – Spain and France
- ssp. portensis – Iberia (syn. N. portensis Pugsley)
- ssp. pugsleyanus Barra & López – Spain
- ssp. radinganorum (syn. N. radinganorum Fernández Casas) – southeast Spain

==== Varieties ====
Narcissus pseudonarcissus ssp. pseudonarcissus itself has many varieties (described by H.W. Pugsley in an article in the Journal of the Royal Horticultural Society of 1933), including var. festinus, var. humilis, var. insignis, var. minoriformis, var. montinus, var. platylobus and var. porrigens. The eighth variety described by Pugsley, var. pisanus, was further defined by A. Fernandes in the Daffodil and Tulip Year Book of 1968.

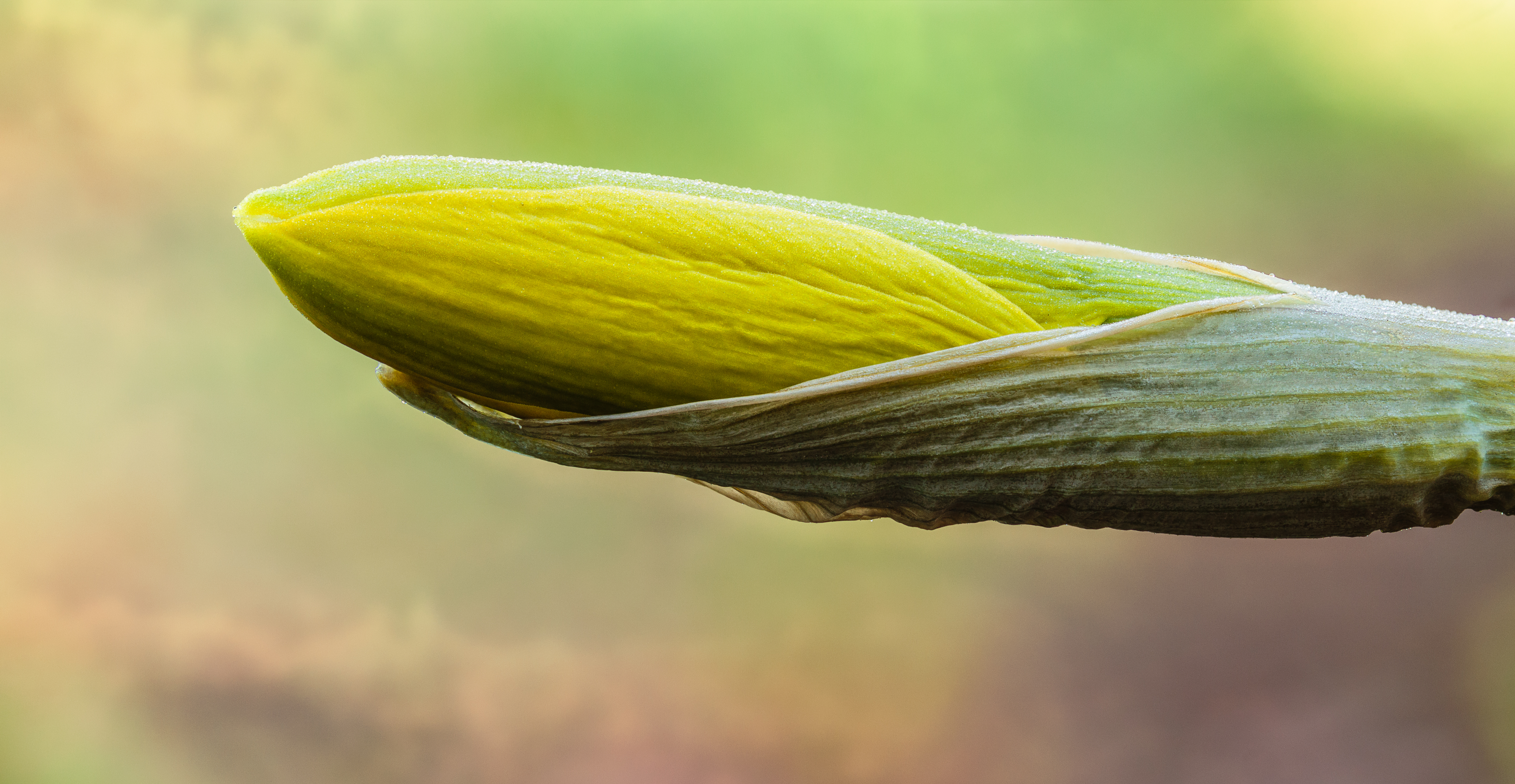
Flower bud in development.

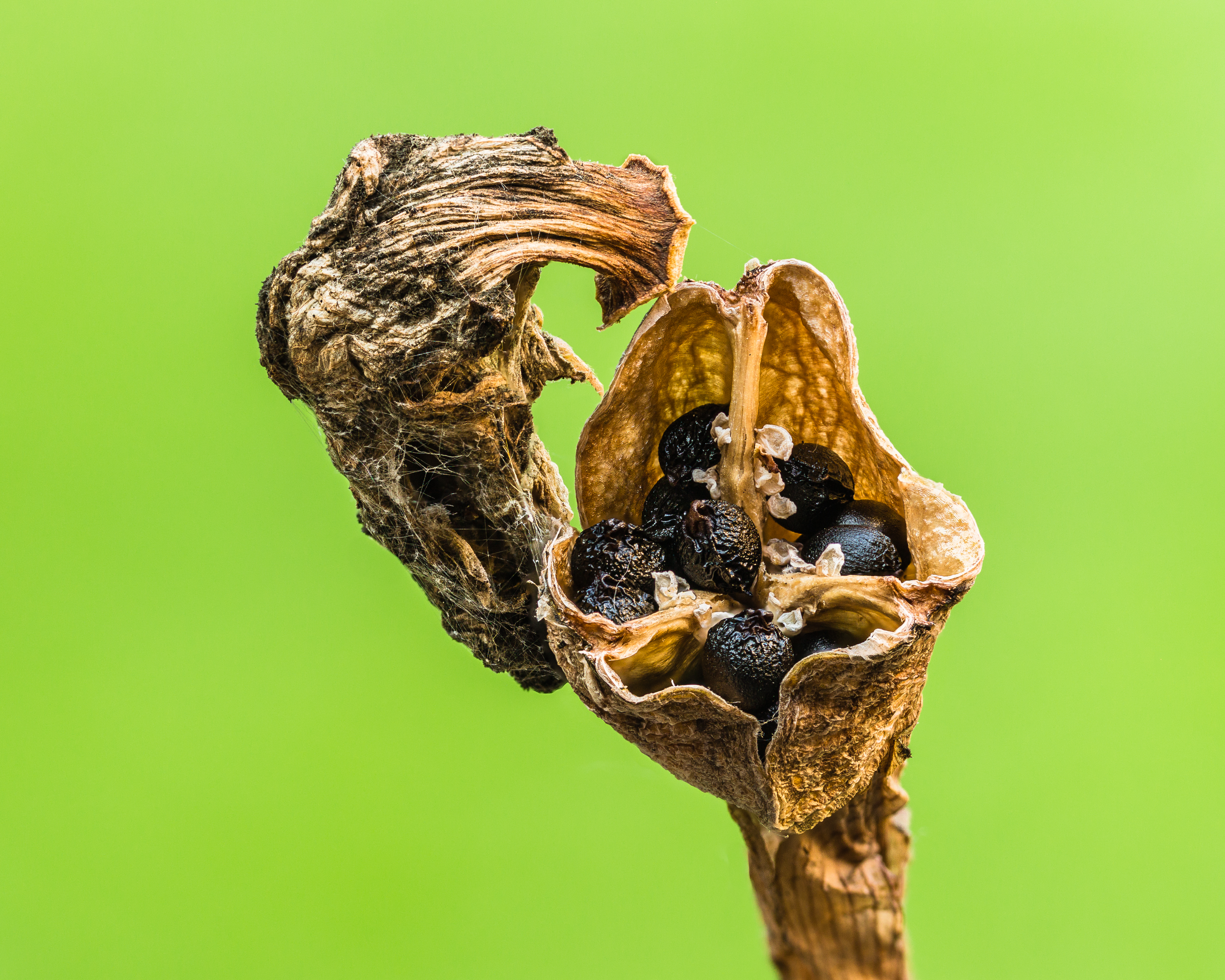
Open seed pruning of a trumpeter daffodil filled with cleft seeds.

==== Double-flowered cultivars ====
Recent research in Wales, southwest England and northern France by keen horticulturists has discovered a small number of remarkably distinct, double-flowered specimens of N. pseudonarcissus growing among wild or naturalised populations of normal N. pseudonarcissus. Such rare forms were known to exist as long ago as the late 16th and early 17th century by botanists and herbalists such as John Gerard and John Parkinson, who variously described them as "Pseudonarcissus Anglicus flore pleno", "Gerrards double Daffodill" and later "The English Double Daffodil". Bulbs have been collected with the landowners' permission and it is hoped that some of these unusual cultivars may become commercially available in the future.

== Emblem ==
The daffodil is the national flower of Wales, it is called Cennin Pedr (Peter's Leek) in Welsh. The daffodil is also the county flower of Gloucestershire.

== Health risks ==
Like all Narcissus species, daffodils contain the alkaloid poison lycorine, mostly in the bulb, but also in the leaves. Because of this, daffodil bulbs and leaves should never be eaten.

== See also ==
- List of Award of Garden Merit narcissus
- List of Narcissus species
- List of plants known as lily
