= List of masters of Peterhouse, Cambridge =

The Master of Peterhouse, Cambridge is the head of the oldest Cambridge University college, Peterhouse. As of 2014 there have been 52 masters (counting John Cosin twice), the incumbent being Andy Parker (physicist).

== List of masters ==
#	Name	Portrait	Term of office	
1	Gerard de Hoo		occurs 1290, after 21 June	
2	Robert de Winwick		occurs 1333	
3	Robert de Mildenhall		occurs 12 May 1338 (Note: Disputed by Venn, as de Mildenhall was Master of Michaelhouse 1328 to at least 1347.)	
4	Roger de la Goter		occurs 1338–9 and 1340.	
5	Ralph de Holbeche		occurs April 1344	1349 (resigned)
6	William de Whittlesea		10 September 1349	1351 (resigned)
7	Richard de Wisbeche		1351	c. 1374
8	Thomas de Wormenhall		c. 1374	1381–2†
9	John de Newton		3 March 1382	1397 (resigned)
10	William Cavendish		11 April 1397	1397 (resigned)
11	John de Bottlesham		27 August 1397	1400 (resigned)
12	Thomas de Castro-Bernardi		14 June 1400	occurs 1417–18, died 1420–1.
13	John Holbroke		1418? (occurs before 1421)	1436†?
14	Thomas Lane		1436? (occurs 1438)	1473†
15	John Warkworth		6 November 1473	October 1500†
16	Thomas Denman		19 November 1500	1500–1†
17	Henry Hornby		1500–1	12 February 1518†
18	William Burgoyne		18 or 19 February 1518	died before 30 January 1523
19	John Edmunds		occurs from Michaelmas 1523	November 1544†
20	Ralph Aynsworth		1544	1553 (ejected)
21	Andrew Perne		4 February 1554	26 April 1589†
22	Robert Some		11 May 1589	14 January 1609†
23	John Richardson		30 January 1609	27 May 1615 (resigned)
24	Thomas Turner		15 June 1615	October 1617†
25	Leonard Mawe		16 November 1617	1625 (resigned)
26	Matthew Wren		26 July 1625	22 January 1635 (resigned)
27	John Cosin		8 February 1635	13 March 1644 (ejected)
28	Lazarus Seaman		11 April 1644	1660 (ejected)
27	John Cosin		3 August 1660 (restored)	18 October 1660 (resigned)
29	Bernard Hale		5 November 1660	29 March 1663†
30	Joseph Beaumont		24 April 1663	24 November 1699†
31	Thomas Richardson		9 December 1699	30 July 1733†
32	John Whalley		21 August 1733	12 December 1748†
33	Edmund Keene		29 December 1748	25 October 1754 (resigned)
34	Edmund Law		12 November 1754	14 August 1787†
35	Francis Barnes		3 May 1788	1 May 1838†
36	William Hodgson		16 May 1838	16 October 1847†
37	Henry Wilkinson Cookson		3 or 4 November 1847	30 September 1876†
38	James Porter		28 October 1876	2 October 1900†
39	Sir Adolphus Ward		29 October 1900	19 June 1924†
40	The Lord Chalmers		5 July 1924	1931 (resigned)
41	Sir William Birdwood		20 April 1931	1938 (resigned)
42	Harold Temperley		1 July 1938	11 July 1939†
43	Paul Cairn Vellacott		29 July 1939	15 November 1954†
44	Herbert Butterfield		17 January 1955	1968
45	John Charles Burkill		1968	1973
46	Grahame Clark		1973	1980
47	The Lord Dacre of Glanton (Hugh Trevor-Roper)		1980	1987
48	Henry Chadwick		1987	1993
49	Sir John Meurig Thomas		1993	2002
50	The Lord Wilson of Tillyorn		2002	2008
51	Adrian Dixon		2008	2016
52	Bridget Kendall		2016	2023
53	Andy Parker		2023	"incumbent"

== See also ==
- List of members of Peterhouse, Cambridge
- List of Vice-Chancellors of the University of Cambridge
