= List of members of Peterhouse, Cambridge =

This is a list of notable members of Peterhouse, a college of the University of Cambridge, England. It includes alumni, fellows and Masters of the college.

== Alumni ==
=== Public servants ===
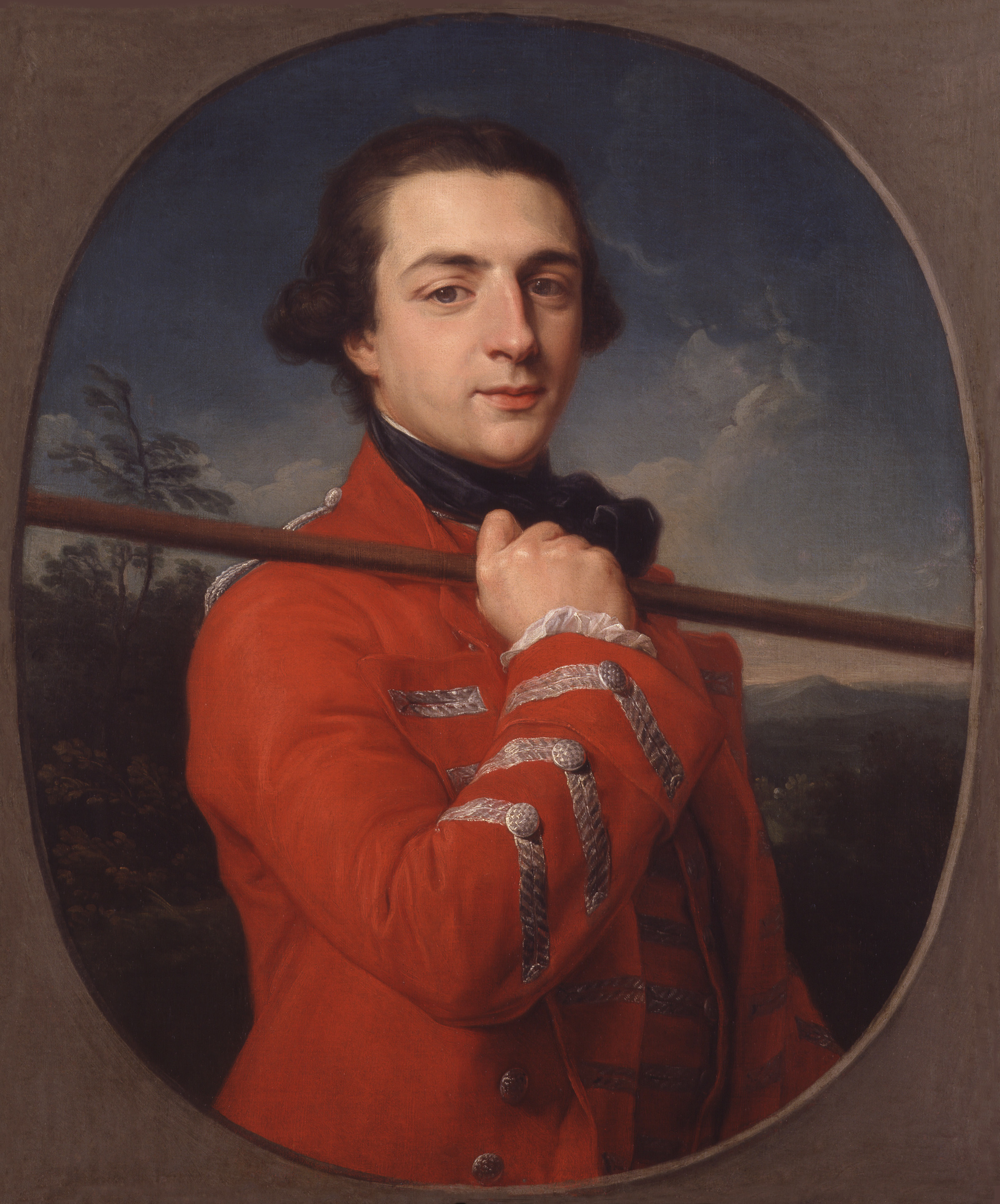
The Duke of Grafton
Prime Minister of Great Britain (1768–1770)

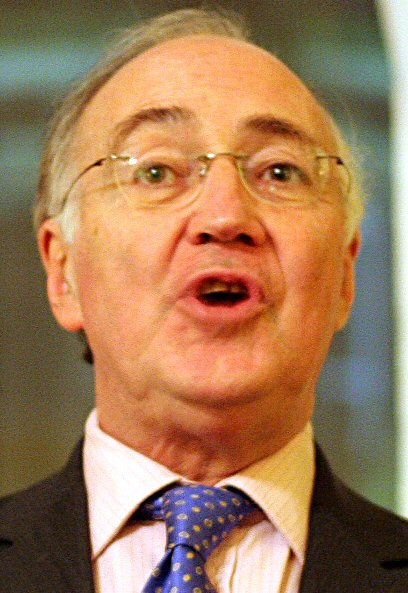
Michael Howard
Leader of the Conservative Party (2003–2005)

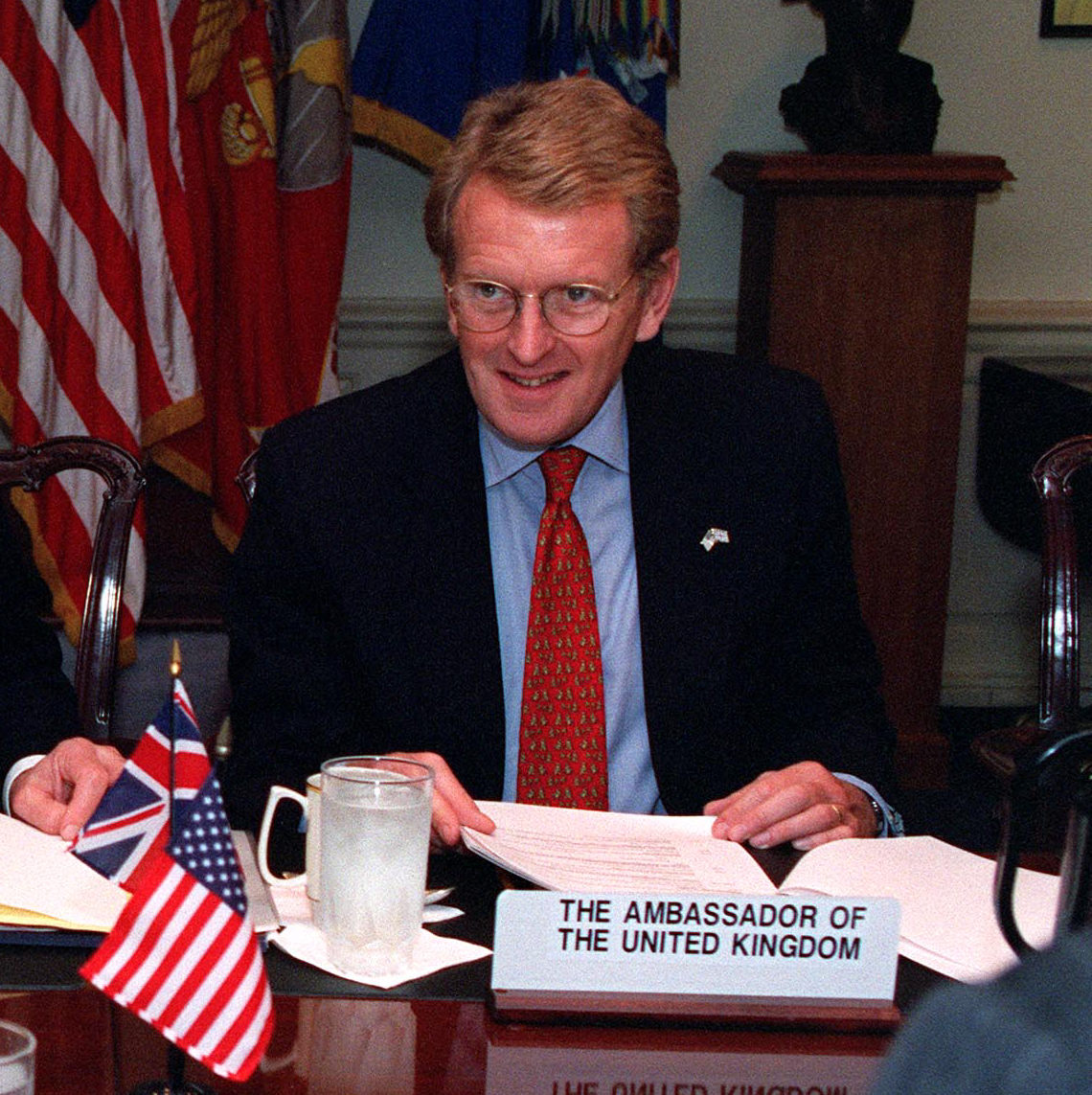
Christopher Meyer
British Ambassador to the United States (1997–2003)

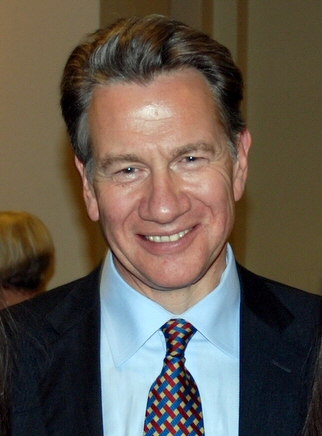
Michael Portillo
Cabinet Minister (1992–1997)

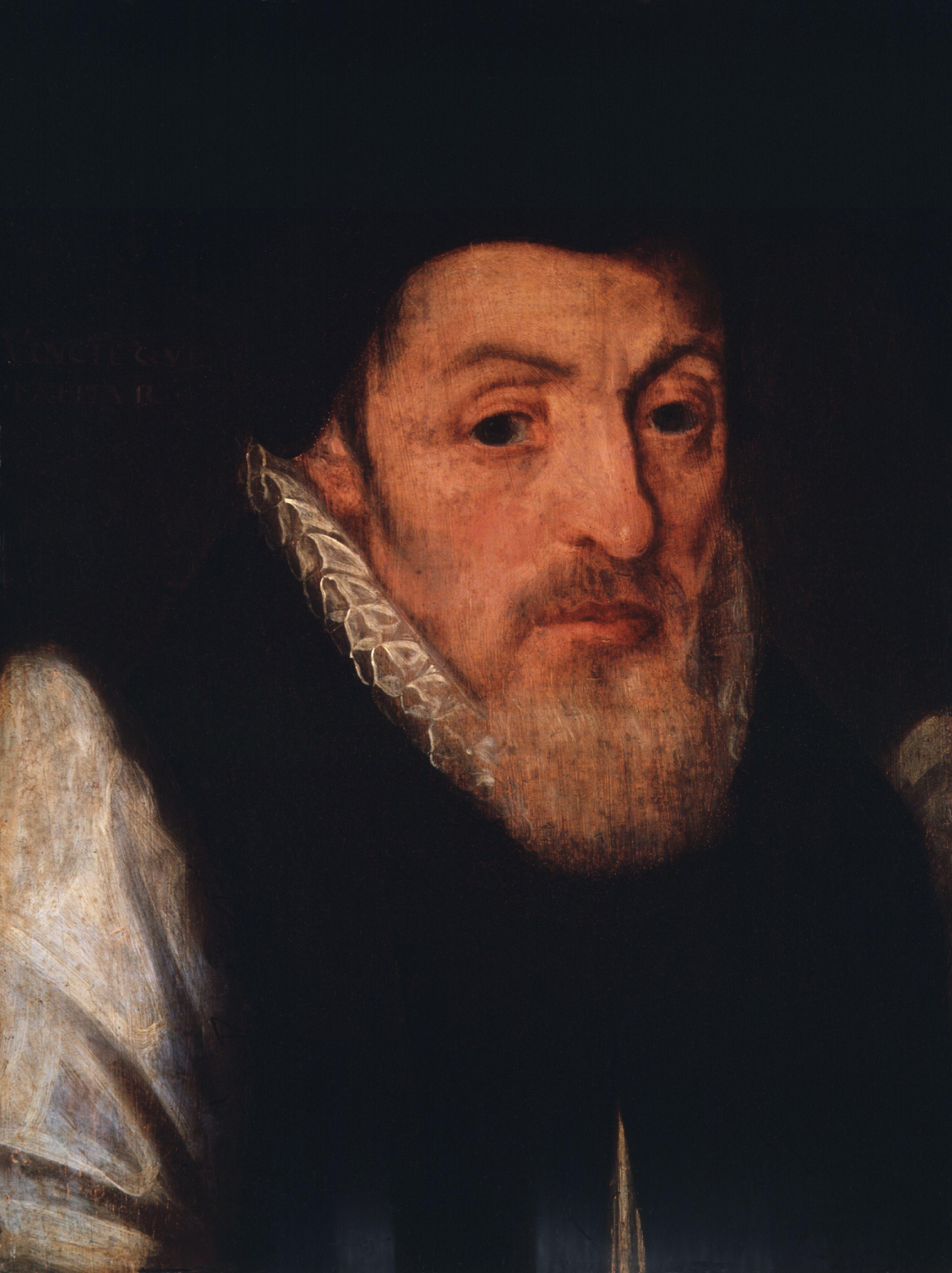
John Whitgift
Archbishop of Canterbury (1583–1604)
- Elizabeth Butler-Sloss, Baroness Butler-Sloss - First female Lord Justice of Appeal, 1988–1999, President of the Family Division, High Court of Justice, 1999–2005
- The Duke of Grafton, Prime Minister of Great Britain, 1768–1770
- Elijah Mudenda, Prime Minister of Zambia, 1975–1977
- Michael Howard, Leader of the Conservative Party, 2003–2005
- Christopher Meyer, British Ambassador to the United States, 1997–2003
- Michael Portillo, Cabinet Minister, 1992–1997
- Nicholas Stern, author of the Stern Review on climate change
- Conrad Swan, Garter Principal King of Arms
- John Whitgift, Archbishop of Canterbury, 1583–1604
- David Wilson, Governor of Hong Kong, 1987–1992

=== Academics, artists, writers ===
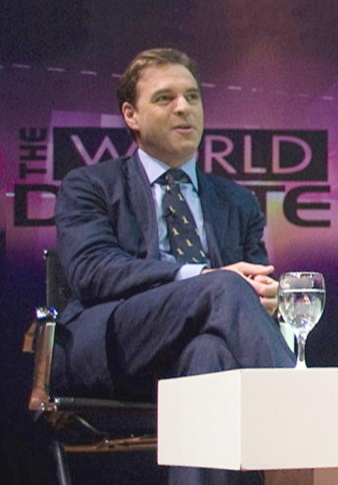
Niall Ferguson
Historian

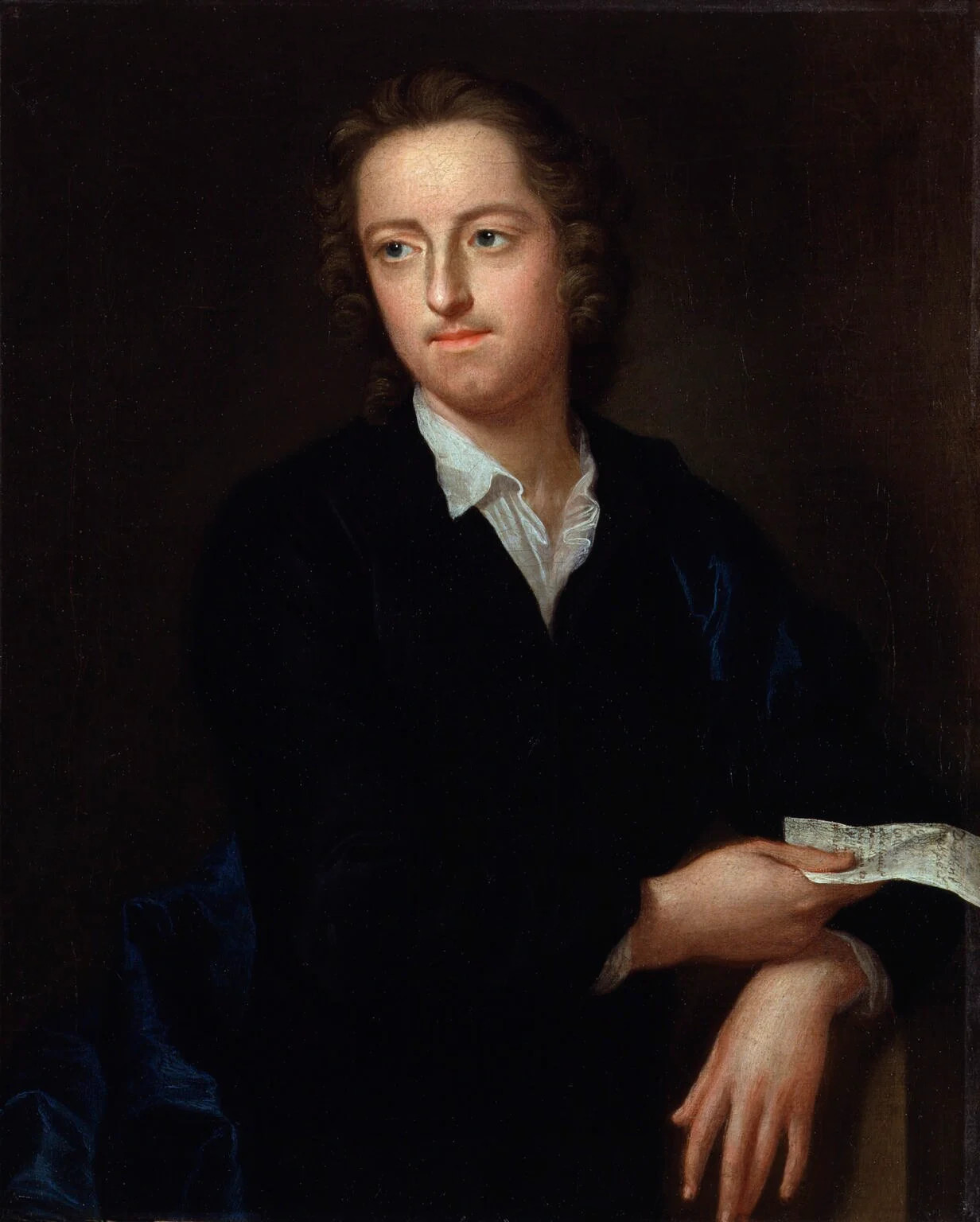
Thomas Gray
Poet

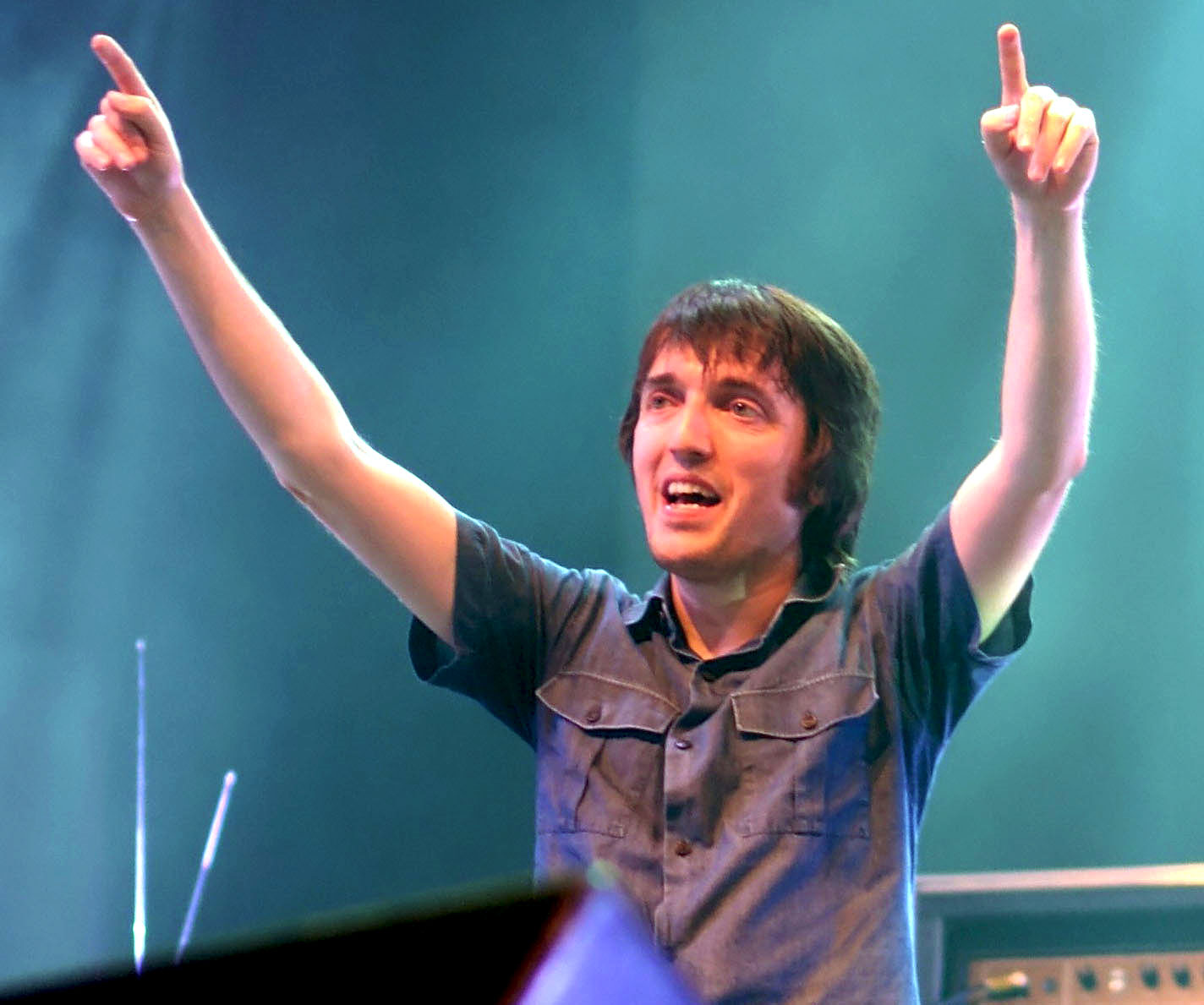
Colin Greenwood
Bassist, Radiohead

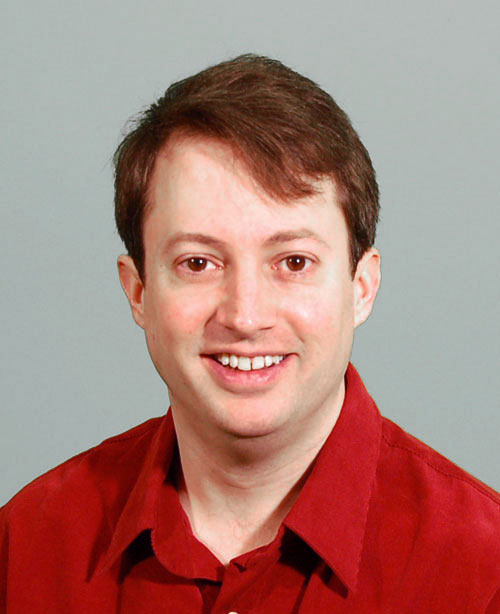
David Mitchell
Actor/comedian (Mitchell and Webb) and writer

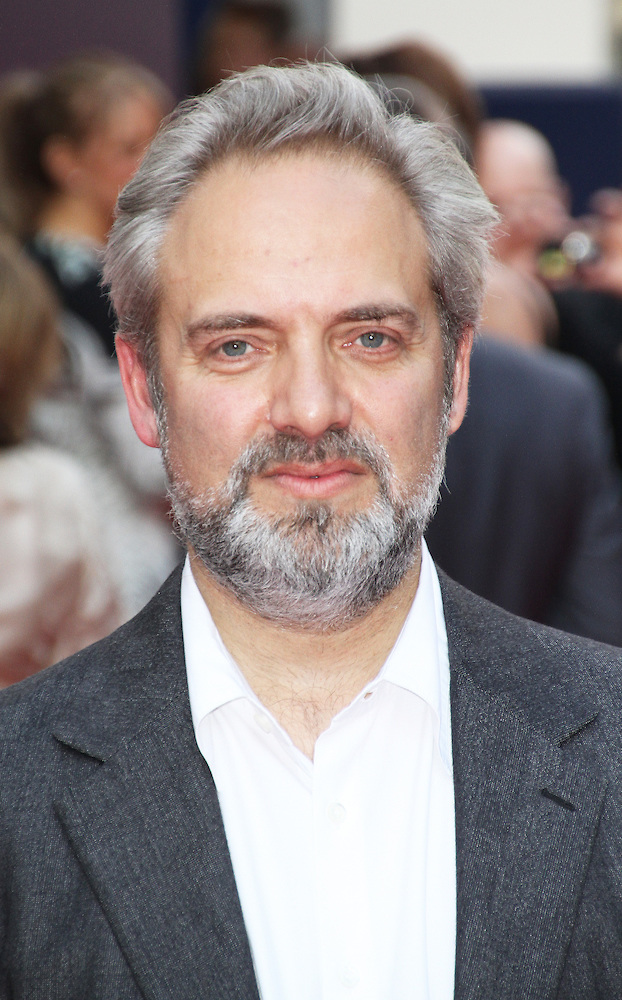
Sam Mendes, Director
- Kingsley Amis, writer
- Richard Baker (broadcaster), broadcaster
- Denis Brogan, historian
- Herbert Butterfield, historian, Master of Peterhouse, 1955–1968, Vice-Chancellor of the University of Cambridge, 1959–1961, and Regius Professor of Modern History, 1963–1968
- Thomas Campion, 16th century composer
- John Ashton Cannon, historian
- Alistair Cooke, Baron Lexden, official historian of the Conservative Party
- Patrick Cosgrave, journalist, author and advisor to Margaret Thatcher
- Maurice Cowling, historian
- Mike Dash, historian
- Marius De Vries, composer and producer, best known as music director of La La Land
- Roger Deakin, naturalist writer
- Robert Dudley Edwards, historian
- Richard Eyre, director, former artistic director of the National Theatre
- Ronan Fanning, historian
- John Finnemore, writer and actor
- Michael Gough, archaeologist
- Thomas Gray, poet
- Colin Greenwood, Radiohead bassist
- Luke Hughes, furniture designer
- Harold James, historian
- David Knowles, Regius Professor of Modern History, 1954–1963
- Denis Mack Smith, historian
- F.X. Martin, historian and first Catholic priest admitted to Cambridge since the Reformation
- James Mason, actor
- Simon McBurney, theatremaker, founder of Complicité
- Sam Mendes, Academy Award-winning film director (for American Beauty) and four-time Laurence Olivier Award winner
- David Mitchell, actor, comedian and writer
- A. L. Morton, Marxist historian
- Michael Postan, historian
- William Ridgeway, classical scholar and Disney Professor of Archaeology, Cambridge University
- Arthur M. Schlesinger Jr., American political historian.
- Karl Schweizer, historian and author.
- Peter Whitehead, filmmaker
- W. David McIntyre, OBE, historian, author, professor, Professor Emeritus, University of Canterbury

=== Scientists and inventors ===
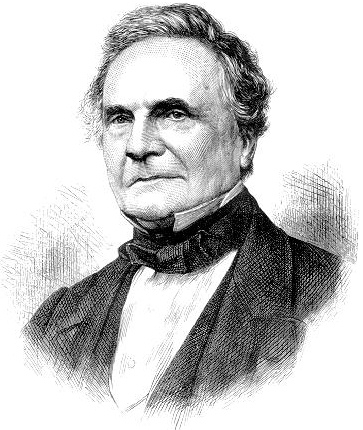
Charles Babbage
Inventor of the difference engine, "father of the computer"

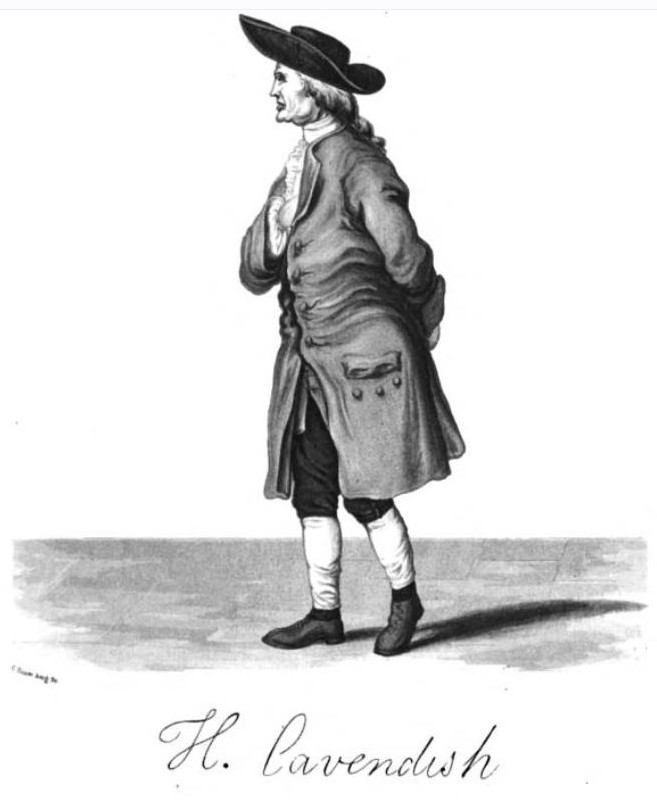
Henry Cavendish
Scientist, discoverer of hydrogen

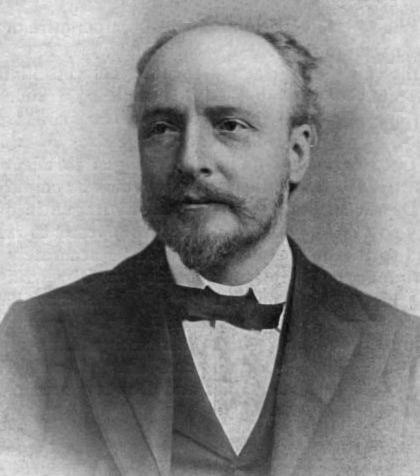
Sir James Dewar
Chemist, physicist, inventor of the Dewar flask

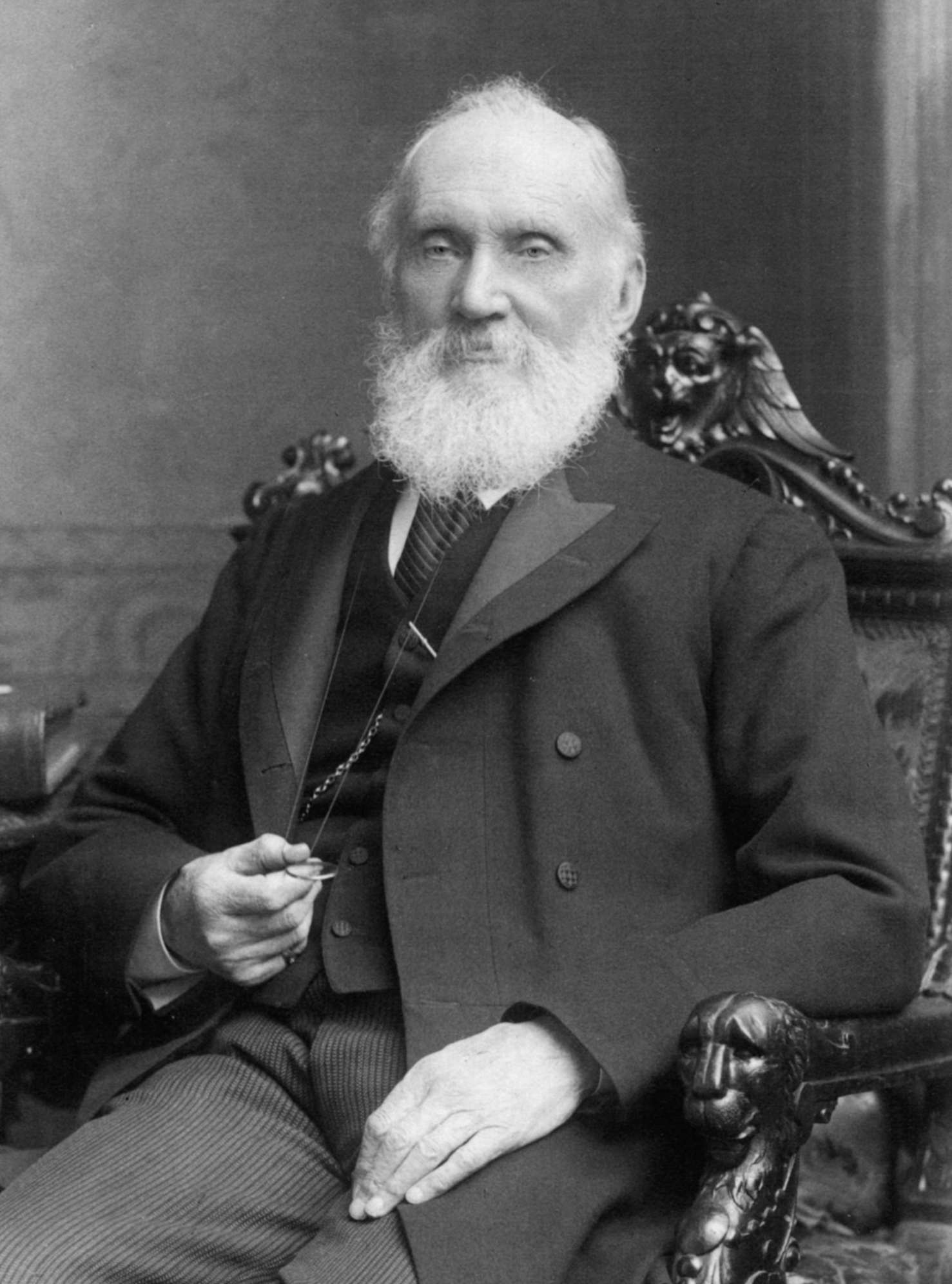
Lord Kelvin
Inventor and pioneer in thermodynamics, electricity and telegraphy

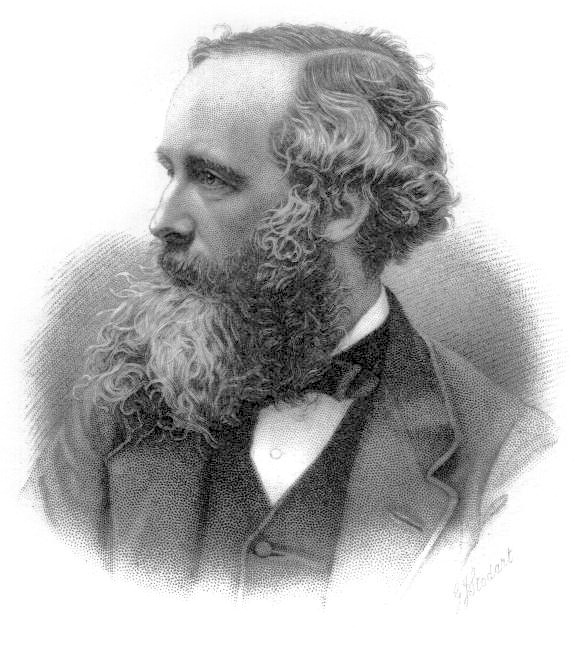
James Clerk Maxwell
Formulator of classical electromagnetic theory

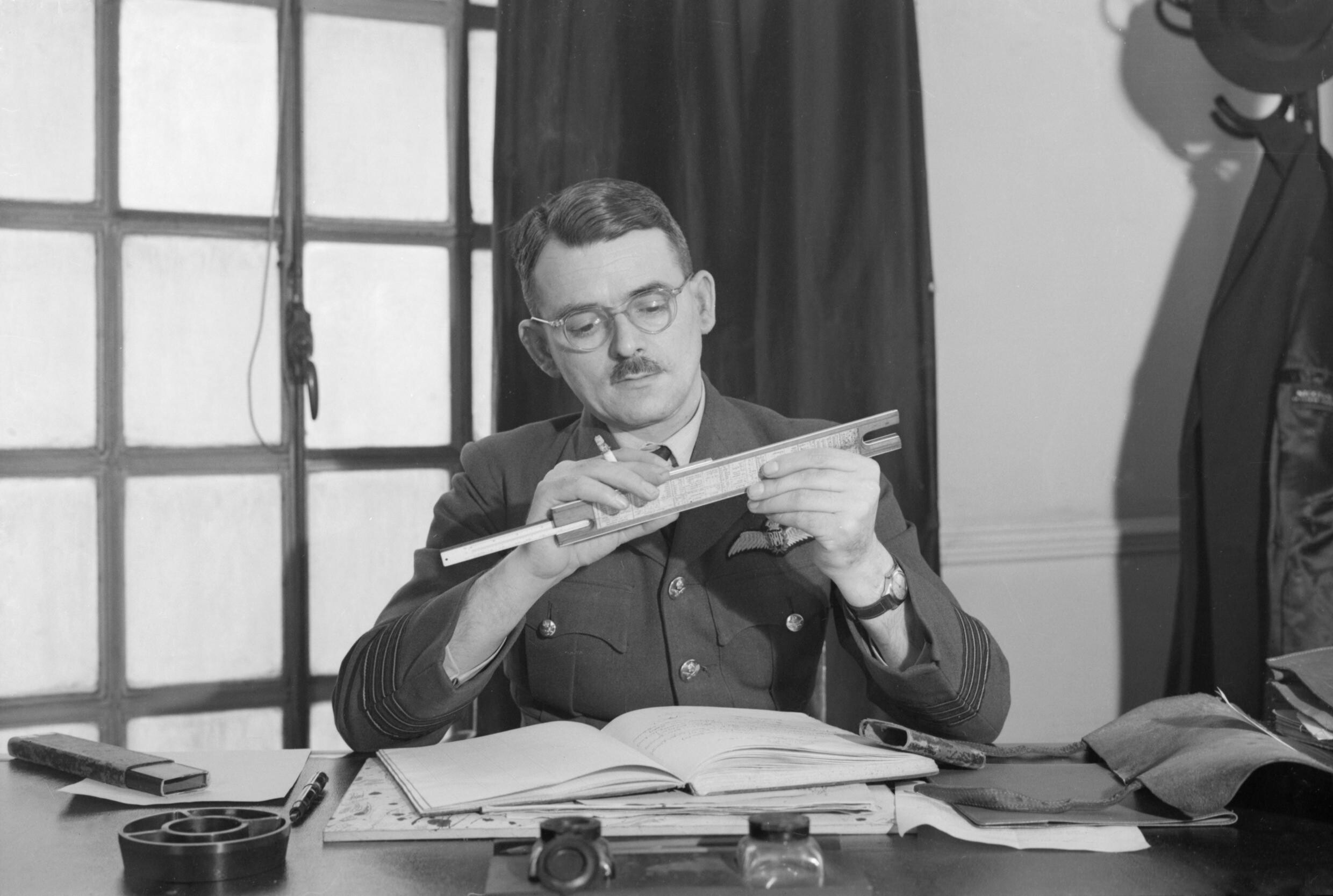
Sir Frank Whittle
Inventor of the jet engine
- Nick Barton, evolutionary biologist
- Christopher Cockerell, inventor of the hovercraft
- Peter Guthrie Tait, mathematician
- William Hopkins, mathematician
- Joseph E. Pesce, astrophysicist
- Edward John Routh, mathematician
- Klaus Roth, mathematician and winner of the Fields Medal
- Philip Charles Woodland, engineer

Name	Birth	Death	Career
Tom Askwith	1911	2001	Permanent Secretary, Blue and Olympic oarsman
Richard Baker	1925	2019	Newsreader
Charles Babbage	1791	1871	Inventor; his analytical engine anticipated the modern computer
Augustus Theodore Bartholomew	1882	1933	Cambridge librarian
William Brewster	1566	1644	Colonial leader and preacher
G. B. Caird	1917	1984	Biblical scholar and churchman
Thomas Campion	1567	1620	Composer and poet
Steph Cook	1972		Gold medal Olympian in pentathlon
Richard Crashaw	1613	1649	Poet
Richard Eyre	1943		Film and theatre director
Robert Foley	1949		Director of the Leverhulme Centre for Human Evolutionary Studies at the University of Cambridge
Augustus Henry Fitzroy, 3rd Duke of Grafton	1735	1811	British Prime Minister
Colin Charles Greenwood	1969		Bass player of Radiohead
Syed Mohammed Hadi	1899	1971	Olympic athlete
Erich Heller	1911	1990	British essayist
Sir Christopher Heydon	1561	1623	English soldier and writer on astrology
Michael Howard	1941		Former leader of the Conservative Party
Hugh Latimer	1485	1555	Religious reformer and Protestant martyr
Edward Law, 1st Baron Ellenborough	1750	1818	Lord Chief Justice
James Mason	1909	1984	Actor
James Clerk Maxwell	1831	1879	Physicist
Dan Mazer	1971		Comic writer
Damian McBride	1974		Former Special Adviser to Gordon Brown
Chris Mead	1940	2003	Ornithologist
Sam Mendes	1965		Film and stage director/producer
Christopher Meyer	1944		Former British ambassador to the US
David Mitchell	1974		Comedian
John Penry	1559	1593	Religious writer and Protestant martyr
Michael Portillo	1953		Former Conservative MP
Ed Smith	1977		Cricketer and author
Nicholas Stern, Baron Stern of Brentford	1946		Author, Stern Review on climate change
Anthony St Leger	1732	1786	Soldier, politician, Governor of Saint Lucia, founder of the St. Leger Stakes
Rory Sweetman		1991	New Zealand historian
Vincent Watts	1940		Vice-Chancellor of the University of East Anglia (1997–2002)
Frank Whittle	1907	1996	Developed jet propulsion
Peregrine Worsthorne	1923	2020	Journalist

== Fellows ==
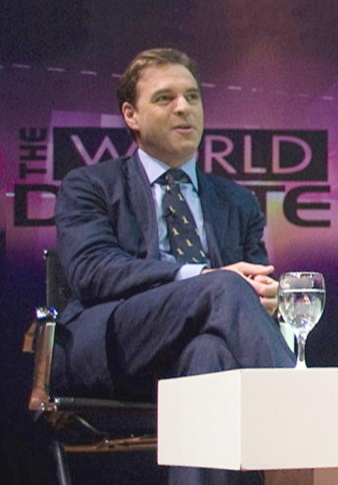
Niall Ferguson, historian

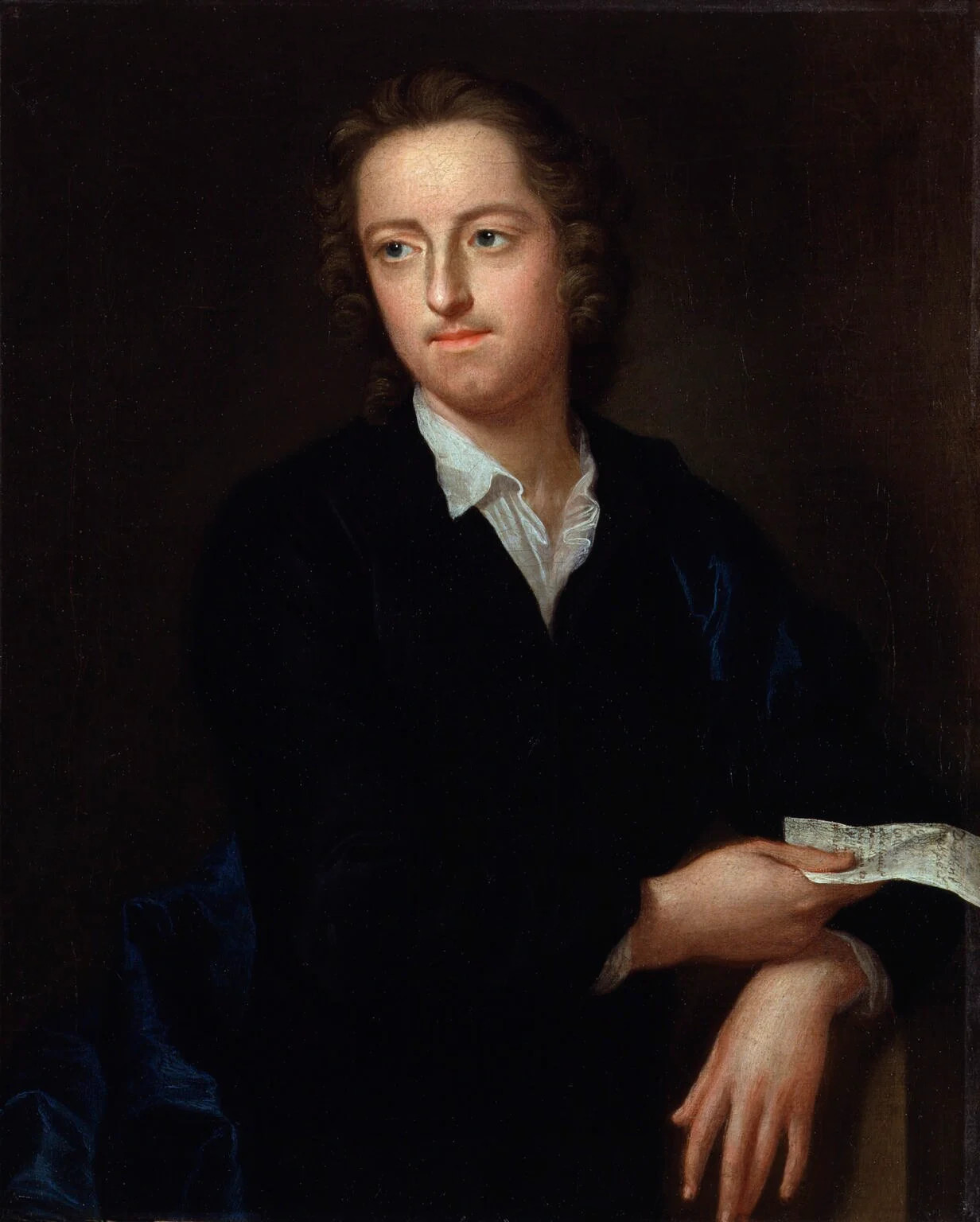
Thomas Gray, poet

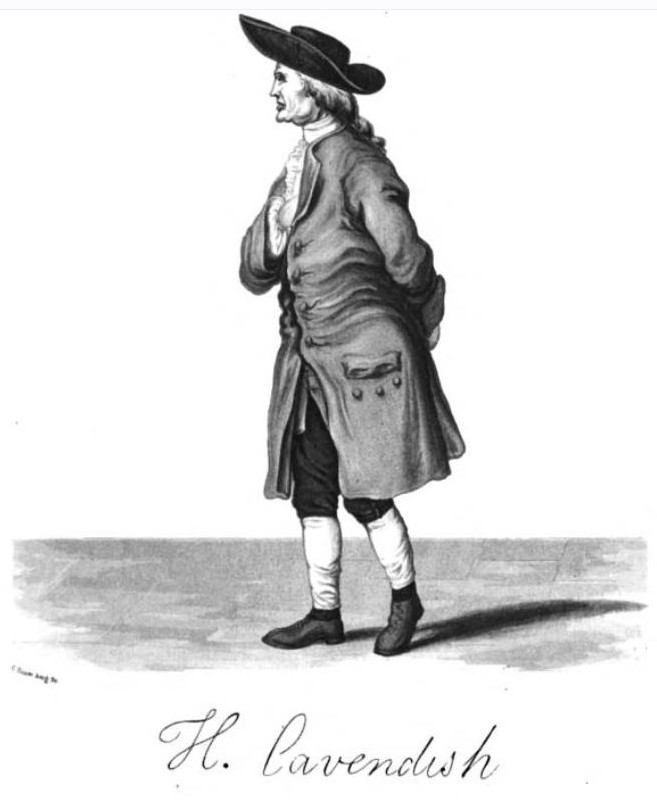
Henry Cavendish, scientist, discoverer of hydrogen

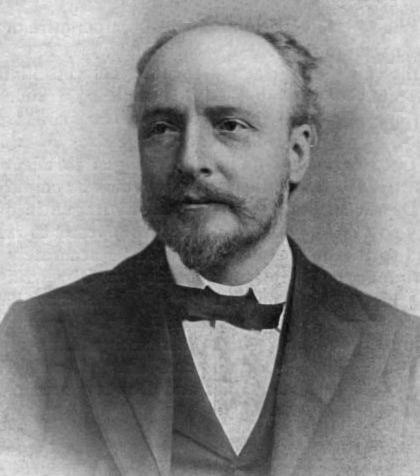
Sir James Dewar, chemist, physicist, inventor of the Dewar flask

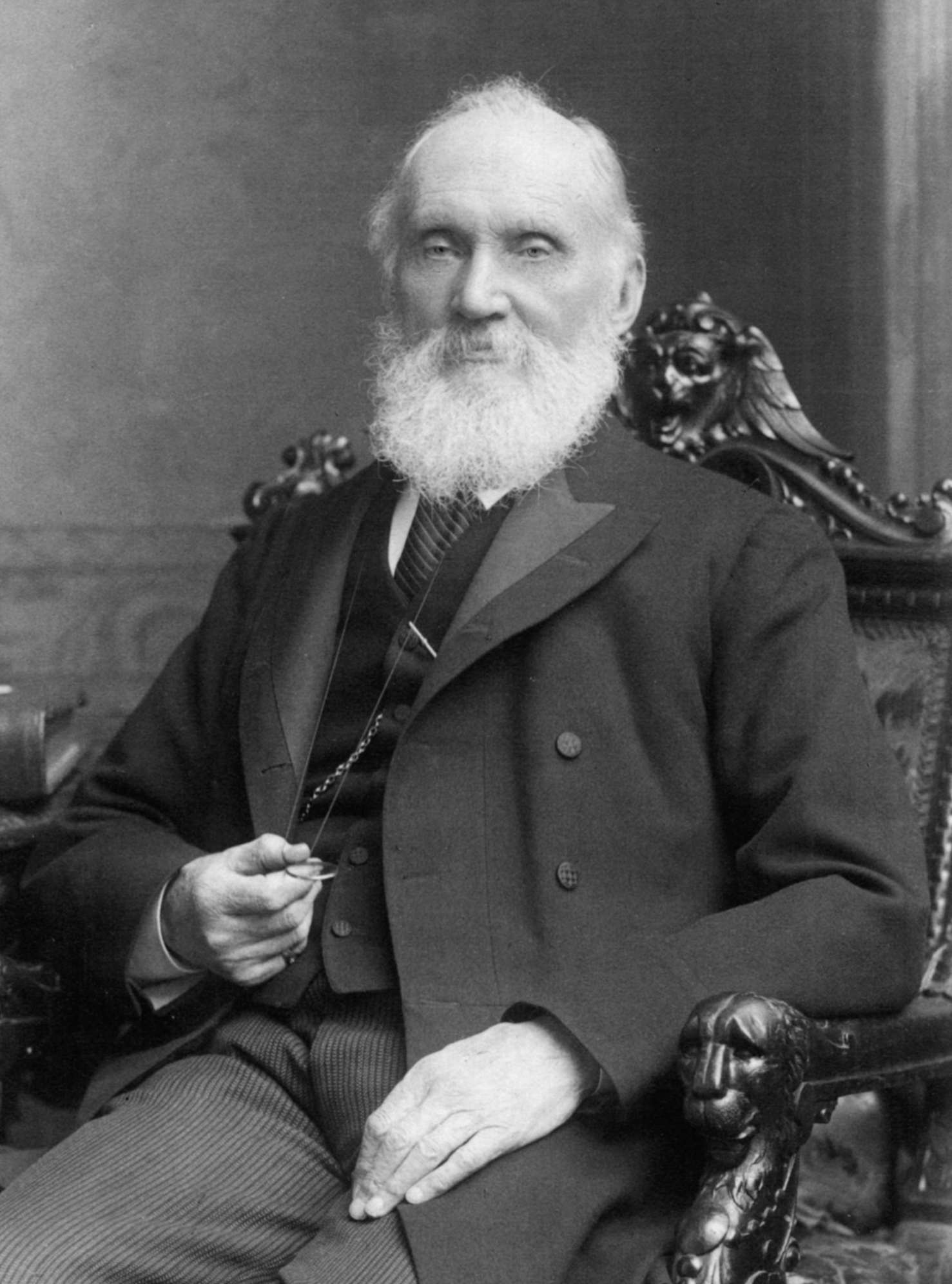
Lord Kelvin, inventor and pioneer in thermodynamics, electricity and telegraphy

Name	Birth	Death	Career
Kingsley Amis	1922	1995	Novelist
Herbert Butterfield	1900	1979	Historian
Henry Cavendish	1731	1810	Scientist
Christopher Cockerell	1910	1999	Inventor of the hovercraft
Maurice Cowling	1926	2005	Historian
Richard Crashaw	1613	1649	Poet
James Dewar	1842	1923	Scientist
Niall Ferguson	1964		Historian
Thomas Gray	1716	1771	Poet and Regius Professor of Modern History
Thomas Heywood	1570?	1641	Playwright and actor
George Joye	1495	1553	Protestant Bible translator
Lord Kelvin	1824	1907	Physicist
Aaron Klug	1926		Nobel Prize Winner
Patrick Lynch	1917	2001	Economist
Archer Martin	1910	2002	Nobel Prize for developing partition chromatography
Fynes Moryson	1566	1630	Travel author
Edward Norman	1938		Theologian
Andrew Perne	1519	1589	Dean of Ely
Max Perutz	1914	2002	Nobel Prize for chemistry
Roger Scruton	1944	2020	Philosopher
Hugh Trevor-Roper, Baron Dacre of Glanton	1914	2003	Historian
Shallet Turner		1762	Regius Professor of Modern History
John Whitgift	1530	1604	Archbishop
