= Alexander Crum Brown =

Scottish organic chemist (1838–1922)

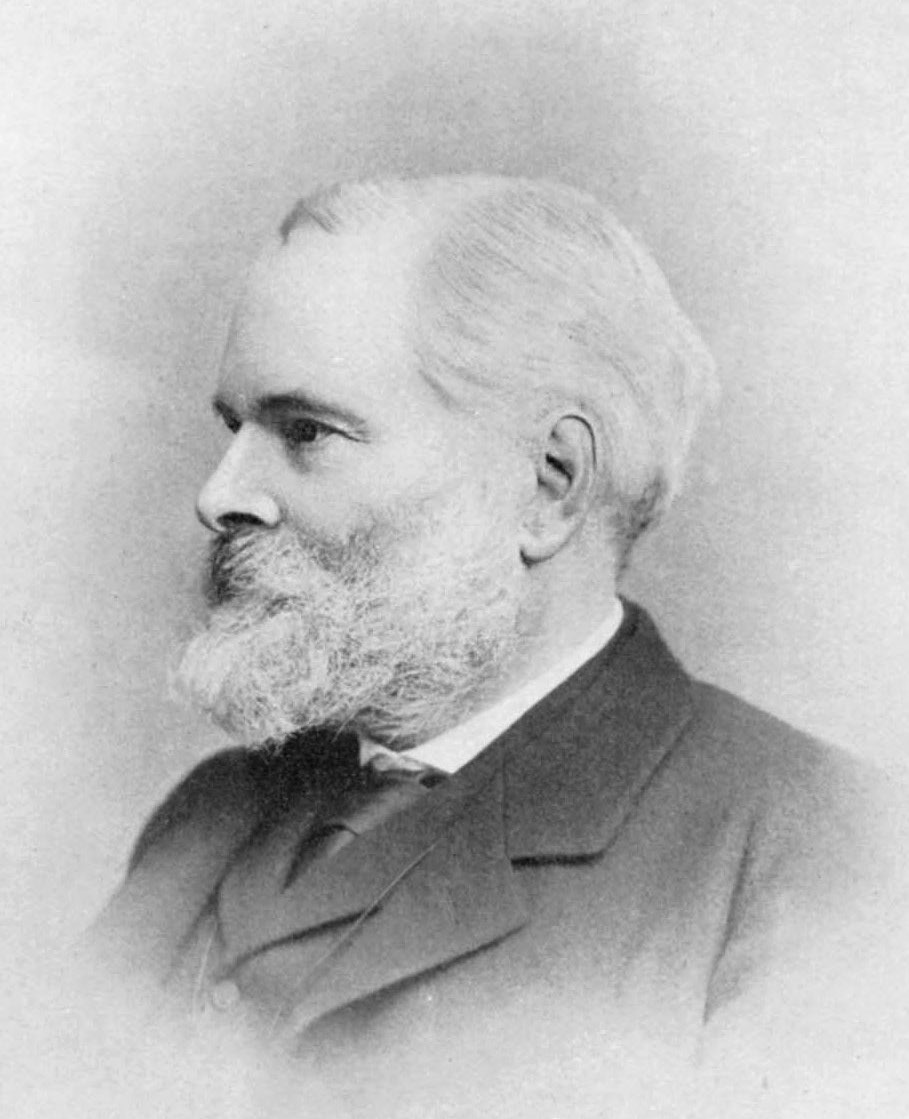
- Born: 26 March 1838; Edinburgh, Scotland
- Died: 28 October 1922 (aged 84); Edinburgh, Scotland
- Education: University of Edinburgh
- Scientific career
- Fields: organic chemistry
- Notable students: Acharya Prafulla Chandra Ray

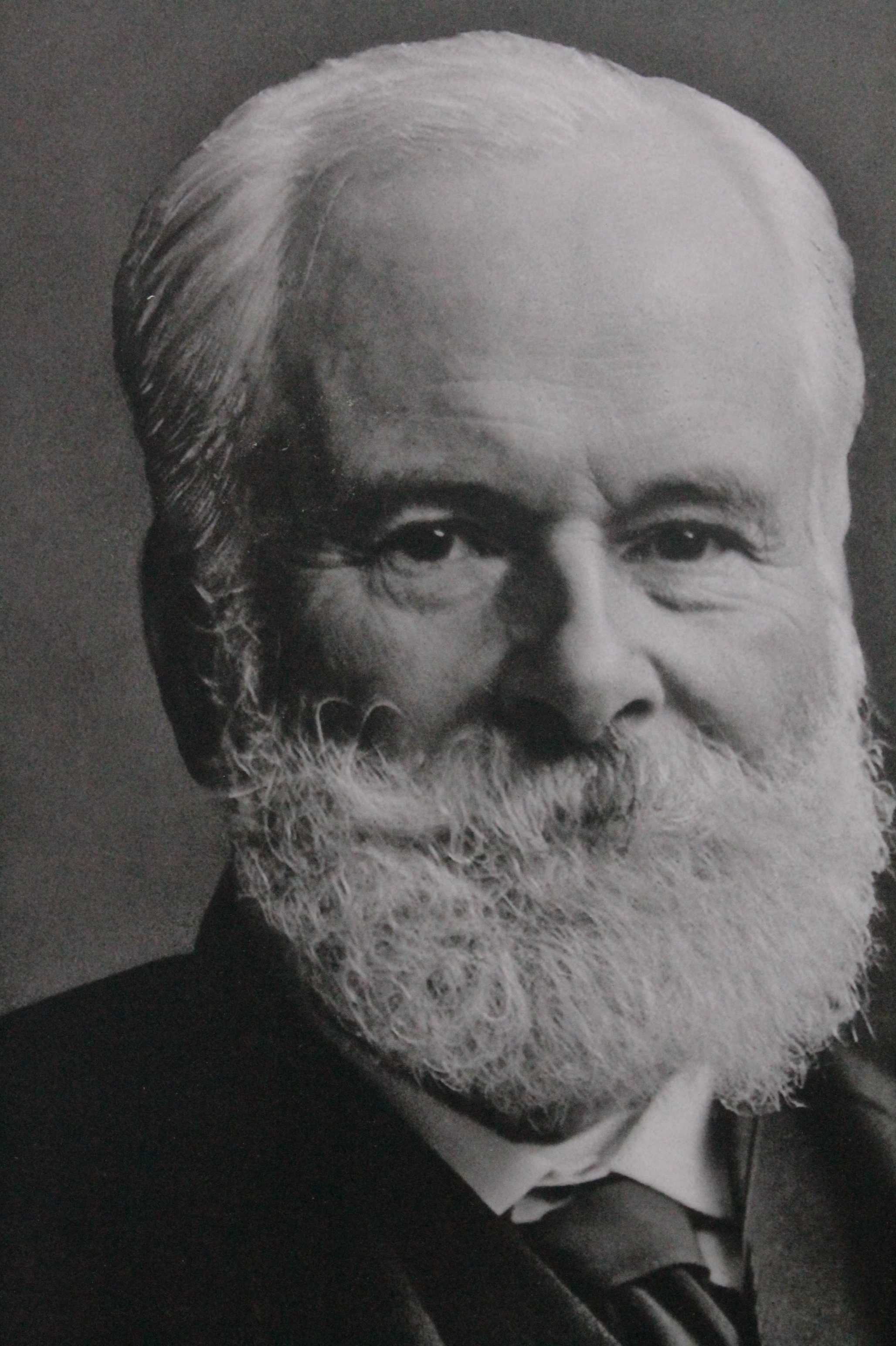
Alexander Crum Brown c. 1900

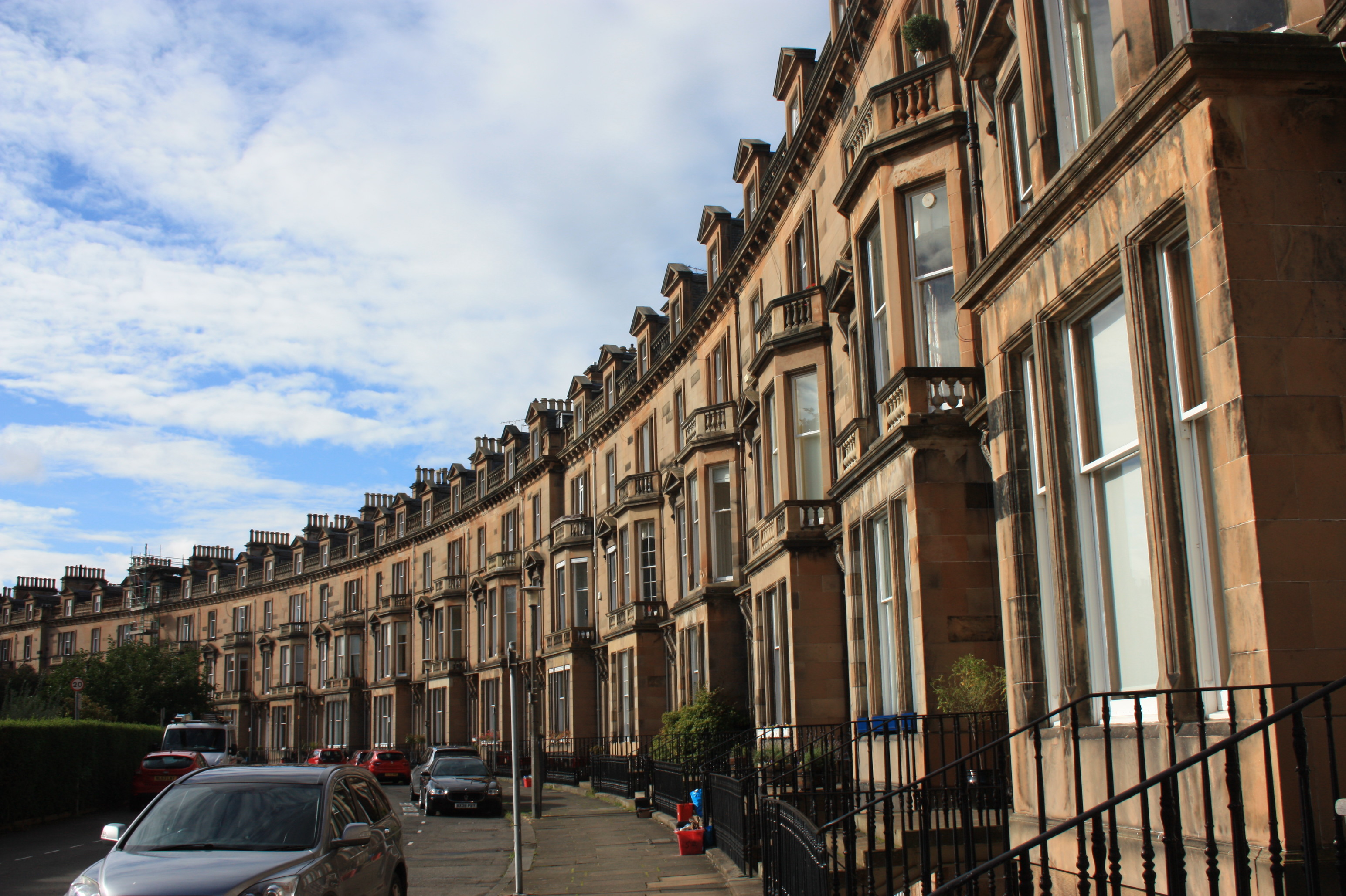
Belgrave Crescent, Edinburgh

Alexander Crum Brown FRSE FRS (26 March 1838 – 28 October 1922) was a Scottish organic chemist. Alexander Crum Brown Road in Edinburgh's King's Buildings complex is named after him.

== Early life and education ==
Alexander Crum Brown was born at 4 Bellevue Terrace in Edinburgh. His mother, Margaret Fisher Crum (d. 1841), was the sister of the chemist Walter Crum, and his father, Rev Dr John Brown (1784-1858), was minister of Broughton Place Church in the east end of Edinburgh's New Town. Crum Brown was baptised on 6 May 1838. His half brother was the physician and essayist John Brown.

For five years, he studied at the Royal High School, then for one year at Mill Hill School in London. In 1854, he entered the University of Edinburgh where he first studied Arts and then Medicine. He was gold medallist in Chemistry and Natural Philosophy and graduated with an MA in 1858. Continuing his medical studies, he received his MD in 1861.

At this time he was also studying for a science degree at the University of London, and in 1862 became the first Doctor of Science at the University of London. After his graduation as from the University of Edinburgh he continued studying chemistry in Germany, first under Robert Bunsen at the University of Heidelberg, and then at the University of Marburg under Adolph Wilhelm Hermann Kolbe.

== Academic career ==
In 1863, he returned to the University of Edinburgh as an extra-academical lecturer in chemistry. In 1869, he was appointed the Professor of Chemistry holding the chair until his retirement in 1908. In his application for this position he was supported by famous chemists such as Baeyer, Beilstein, Bunsen, Butlerov, Erlenmeyer, Hofmann, Kolbe, Volhard and Wöhler. One of his students was Arthur Conan Doyle.

The Crum Brown Chair of Chemistry at the University of Edinburgh was established in 1967 in his honour.

He was elected a Fellow of the Royal Society of Edinburgh in 1863, was awarded its Keith Medal for 1873–75. He served as the Society's vice president from 1905 to 1911. His address at the time of joining the Society was given as 8 Belgrave Crescent in the west end of Edinburgh.

In 1867, he was elected a member of the Harveian Society of Edinburgh and served as one of its secretaries from 1881 to 1903. He was president of the Society in 1899. In 1883 he was elected a member of the Aesculapian Club.

== Hope Scholarship controversy of 1870 ==
Each year, the Hope Scholarship was awarded to the four students at the University of Edinburgh who achieved the highest marks (at first sitting) in the first-term examinations in Chemistry. The Hope Scholars were entitled to free use of the laboratory facilities during the following term.

In 1870, Edith Pechey, one of the Edinburgh Seven, came third in the class, beaten by two male students sitting the exam for the second time, so under the terms of the Hope Scholarship, she had first claim on a scholarship. Fearing that awarding the prize to a woman would be both an affront to many of his esteemed colleagues in the Medical Faculty and a provocation to the male students, Crum Brown chose to award the Hope Scholarship to men whose names appeared lower on the list.

This had important consequences. It made national headlines in The Times and drew attention to the difficulties being encountered by a small group of women studying medicine at the University of Edinburgh.

"[Miss Pechey] has done her sex a service, not only by vindicating their intellectual ability in an open competition with men, but still more by the temper and courtesy with which she meets her disappointment"

== Research ==
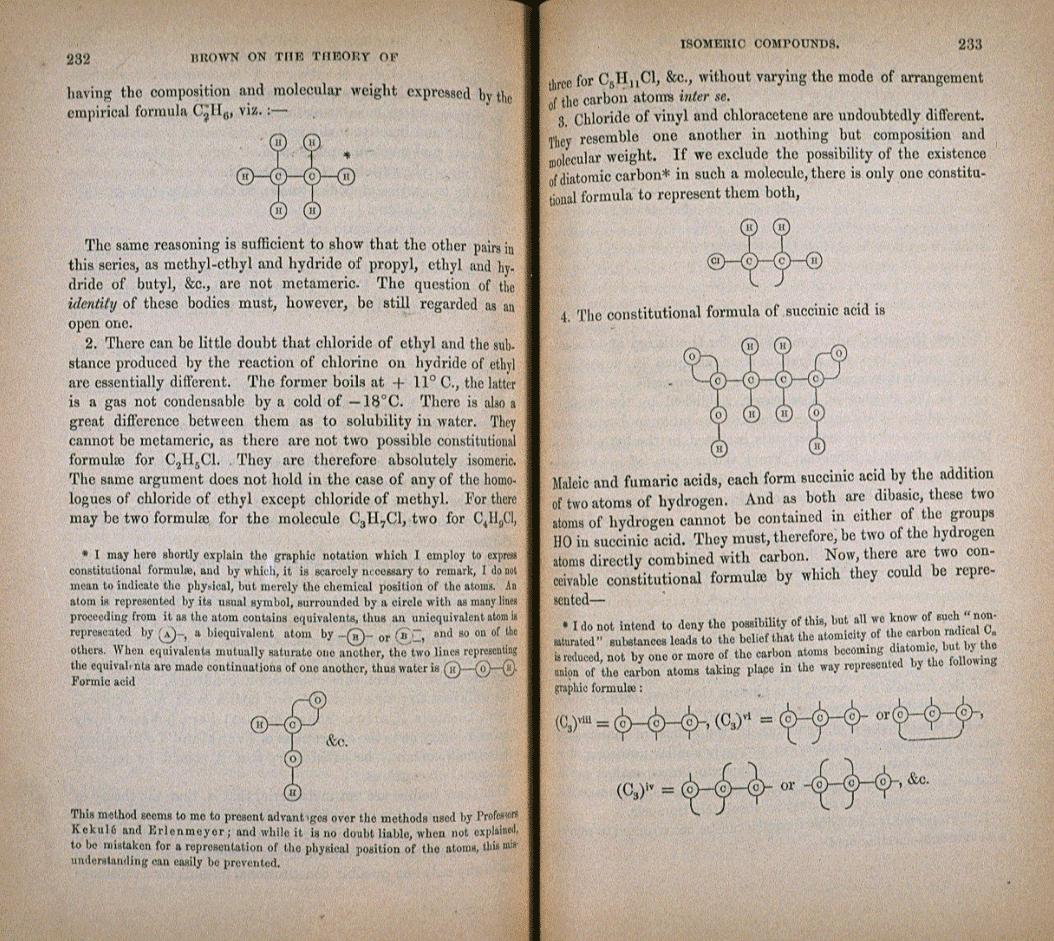
Extract from Alexander Crum Brown's influential paper

Crum Brown's pioneering work concerned the development of a system of representing chemical compounds in diagrammatic form. In 1864 he began to draw pictures of molecules, in which he enclosed the symbols for atoms in circles, and used dashed lines to connect the atomic symbols together in a way that satisfied each atom's valence. The results of his influential work were published in 1864 and reprinted in 1865.

Although Crum Brown apparently never contemplated the practice of medicine, his training as a medical student gave him an interest in physiology and pharmacology. This led him to collaborate during 1867–8 with T. R. Fraser, a distinguished medical graduate, in a pioneering investigation of fundamental importance into the connection between chemical constitution and physiological action. Their method "consists in performing upon a substance a chemical operation which shall introduce a known change into its constitution, and then examining and comparing the physiological action of the substance before and after the change." The change considered was the addition of ethyl iodide to various alkaloids and comparison of the iodides (and the corresponding sulfates) thus obtained with the hydrochlorides of the original alkaloids. Striking regularities were observed, amongst others "that when a nitrile [tertiary] base possesses a strychnialike action, the salts of the corresponding ammonium [quaternary] bases have an action identical with curare [poison]."

He discovered the carbon double bond of ethylene, which was to have important implications for the modern plastics industry. He also made significant contributions to pharmacology, and worked with physiology, phonetics, mathematics and crystallography.

During the 1880s, Crum Brown studied combinations of colours, inks, and designs which helped the Bank of Scotland manufacture bank notes that would be impossible to fabricate using photography. The forgery-proof bank notes were completed in 1885. In November 1888 however, forgeries of these bank notes were discovered in Glasgow and Edinburgh, in which the culprit was found in 1889 to be John Hamilton Gray Mitchell, who had made the fake noted using traditional artistic mediums. The Bank of Scotland amended the bank notes' design.

In 1912, he introduced the name of kerogen to cover the insoluble organic matter in oil shale.

== Personal life ==
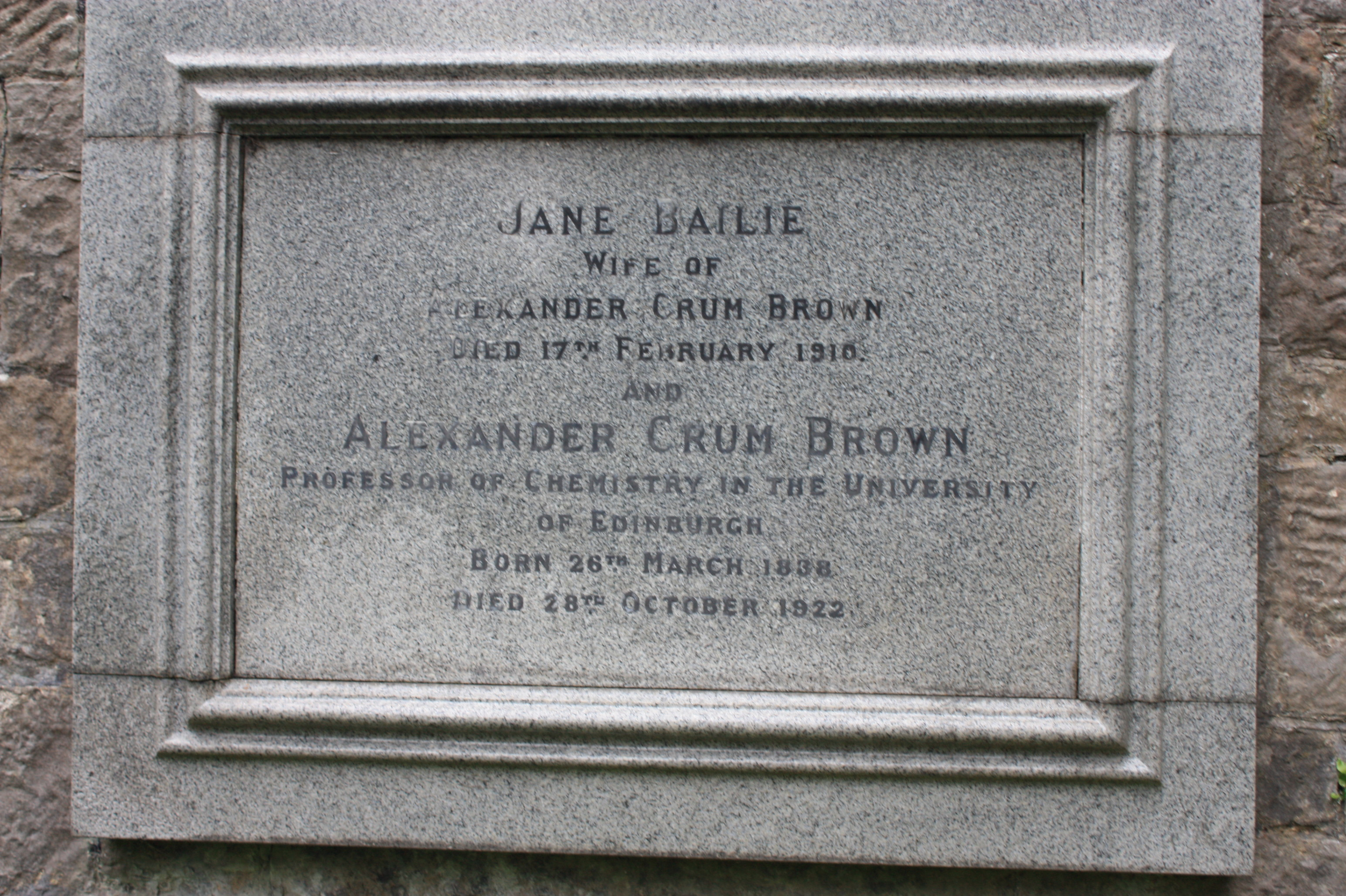
Alexander Crum Brown's grave, Dean Cemetery

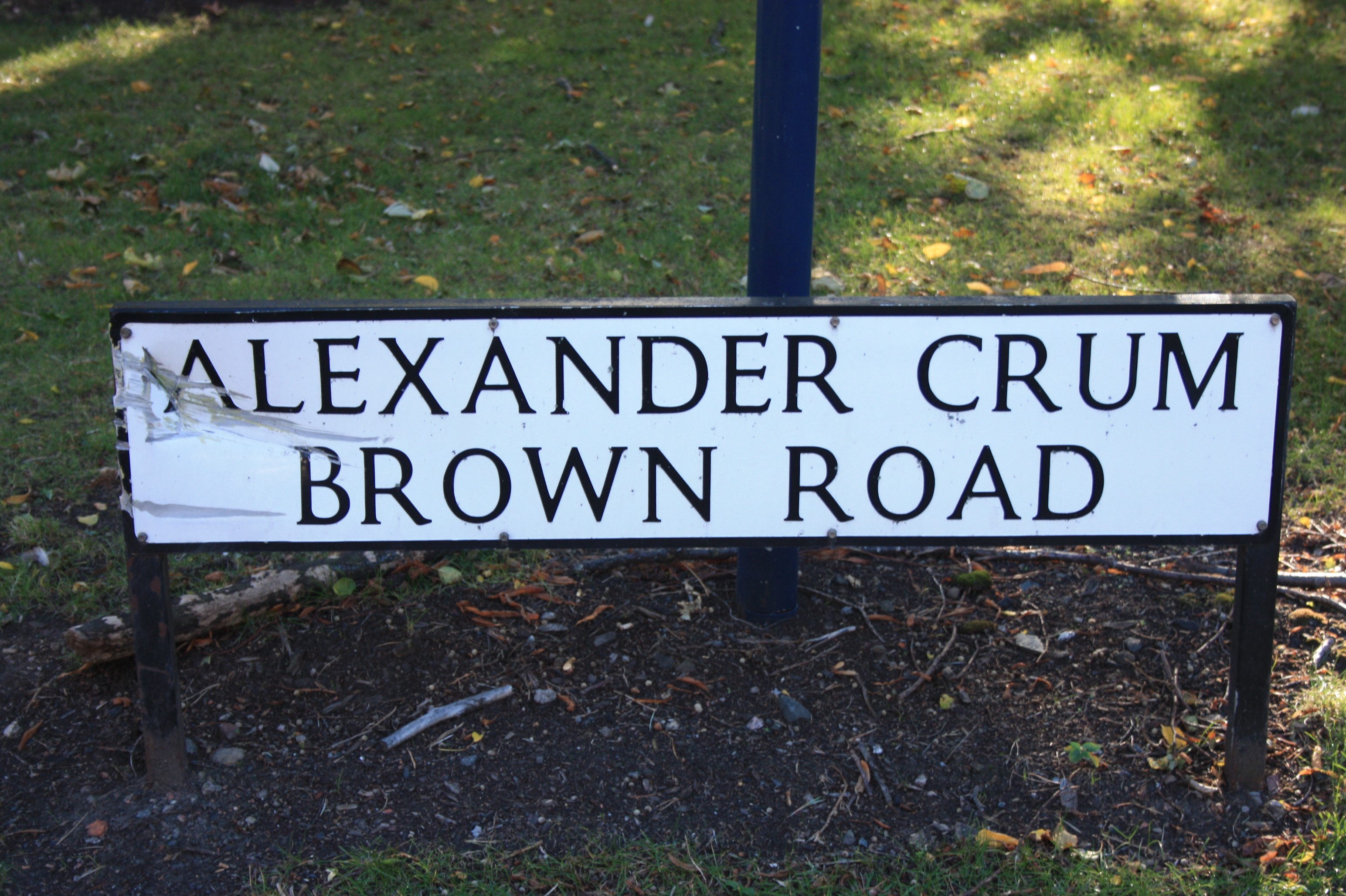
Alexander Crum Brown Road, Edinburgh

Although physically not particularly robust, he was rarely ill. He spent much of his holiday time walking in the Scottish Highlands and in Europe.

In 1866, he married Jane Bailie Porter (d.1910). Porter was the sister of William Archer Porter, James Porter and Margaret Archer Porter, who married physicist Peter Tait.

He remained intellectually active until his death in Edinburgh in 1922.

== Death ==
Crum Brown died 28 October 1922, aged 84, and is buried on the obscured southern terrace of Dean Cemetery.

== Artistic recognition ==
William Brassey Hole's sketch of Crum Brown in a laboratory in 1884, is held by the Scottish National Portrait Gallery.

== Other recognition ==
In 2015, the City of Edinburgh Council agreed a request by the University of Edinburgh to name a street within the King's Buildings complex after Crum Brown.
