= James Porter (Master of Peterhouse, Cambridge) =

British academic (1827–1900)

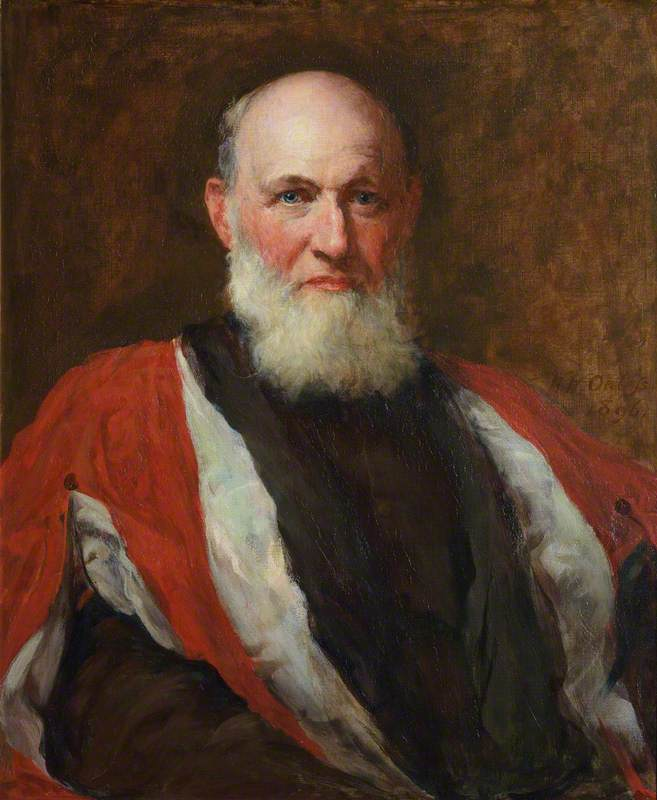
James Porter by Walter William Ouless

James Porter (2 October 1827, Belfast – 2 October 1900, Cambridge) was a British academic in the second half of the 19th century.

Porter was born on 2 October 1827 in Belfast, the son of Rev. James Porter, Presbyterian minister, Rector of Drumlee, Castlewellan, County Down. Porter's siblings were:

- William Archer Porter, a lawyer and educationist who served as the principal of Government Arts College, Kumbakonam and tutor and secretary to the Maharaja of Mysore;
- Jane Bailie Porter, who married Alexander Crum Brown, the Scottish organic chemist;
- Margaret Archer Porter, who married Peter Guthrie Tait, the physicist.

Porter graduated M.A. from the University of Glasgow in 1847, and continued to Peterhouse, Cambridge (admitted 8 July 1847, graduated B.A. as 9th wrangler 1851, M.A. 1854, D.D. 1881).

Porter taught mathematics at Liverpool College 1851–55, and was ordained deacon in 1853 and priest in 1856.

He was to spend the rest of his career at Peterhouse. He was appointed Fellow in 1853; Dean in 1856; Bursar in 1861; Assistant Tutor in 1863; Tutor 1866–76; and Master 1876–1900. He also served as Senior proctor in 1868–69 and 1876–77; Vicar of Cherry Hinton 1880–82; and Vice-Chancellor of the University of Cambridge 1881–84.

"He was endowed with a great activity both mental and physical, which found expression on the one hand in a keen participation in athletic sports, and on the other in whole-hearted efforts to promote the highest interests of the University." In Dr T. A. Walker's History of Peterhouse (1906) the Rev. James Porter is described as a “man of notable business qualifications and of a rare generosity of spirit.”

Academic offices
| Preceded by Henry Wilkinson Cookson | Master of Peterhouse, Cambridge; 1876–1900 | Succeeded by Adolphus Ward |
| Preceded by Edward Perowne | Vice-Chancellor of the University of Cambridge; 1881–1884 | Succeeded by Norman Macleod Ferrers |
