= Samuel Collins (theologian) =

English clergyman and academic

Samuel Collins (1576–1651) was an English clergyman and academic, Regius Professor of Divinity at Cambridge and Provost of King's College, Cambridge.

== Life ==
He was the son of Baldwin Collins, fellow and vice-provost of Eton College. He was born at Eton on 5 August 1576, and studied for nine years in Eton School. In 1591 he was elected to a scholarship at King's College, Cambridge, where he graduated B.A. 1595–6, M.A. 1599, B.D. 1606. He became chaplain to Archbishop Richard Bancroft and to his successor, Archbishop George Abbot.

Collins obtained the rectory of Fen Ditton in Cambridgeshire, and held also the sinecure rectory of Milton in the same county. He was created D.D. at the Cambridge commencement, 3 March 1613, when he was selected by John Richardson (translator), the Regius Professor of Divinity, to answer upon three questions in a divinity act held in St. Mary's Church before Charles, Prince of Wales, and Frederick V, Elector Palatine.

On the death of William Smith he was elected Provost of King's College in April 1615, and about the same time he was appointed one of the king's chaplains. On 22 October 1617 he was elected Regius Professor of Divinity, at Cambridge. To this chair James I annexed, as endowment, the rectory of Somersham in Huntingdonshire Collins is said to have lectured for 34 years, twice a week, constantly covering fresh material. He maintained a constant correspondence with Sir Henry Wotton during his embassy at Venice, and Wotton presented to King's College a portrait of Paolo Sarpi. In 1628 the fellows of King's, in a petition to John Williams, the Bishop of Lincoln, charged the provost with bribery, simony, and other matters; but Williams found the charges groundless, and attributed the dissatisfaction to Collins's biting wit.

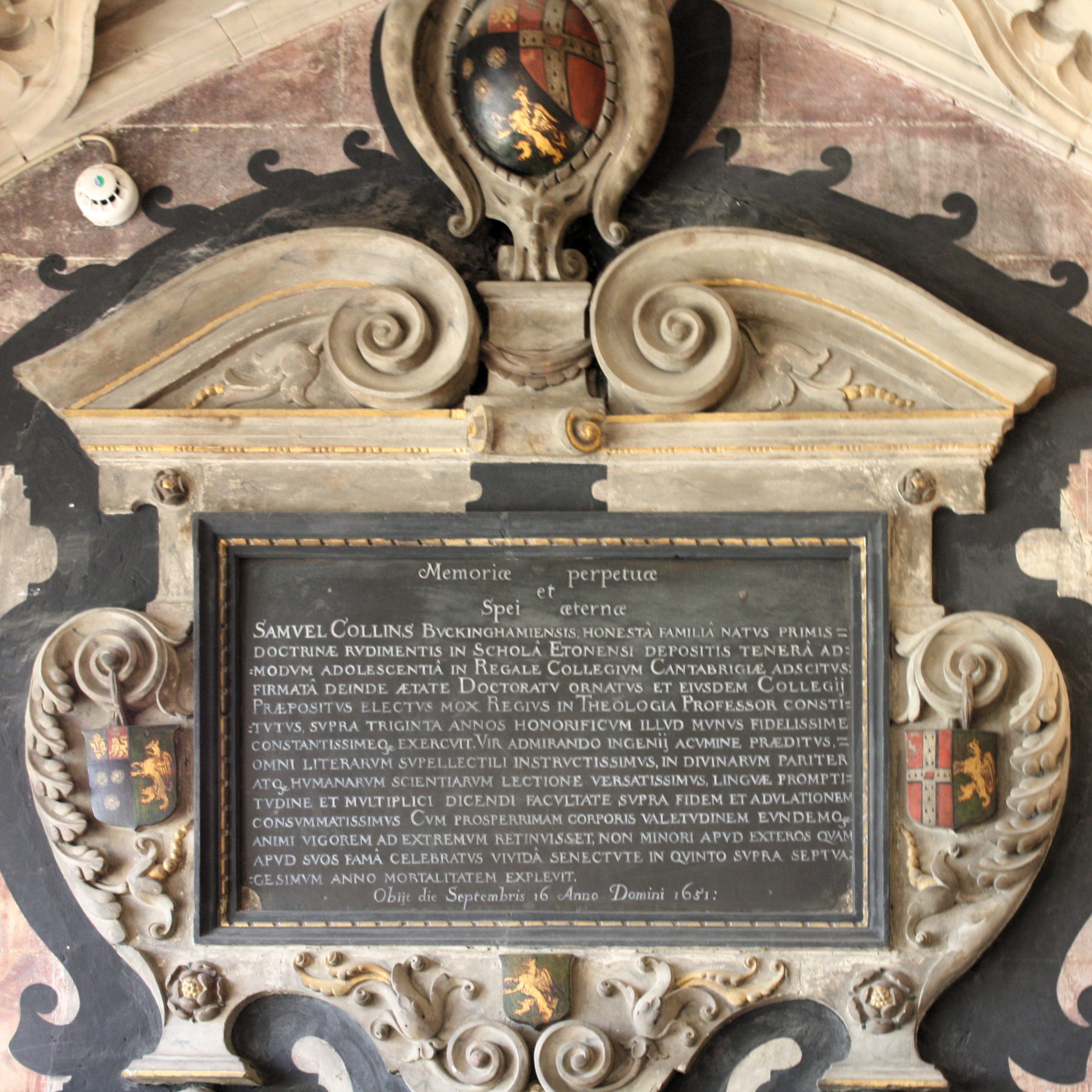
Commemorative plaque to Samuel Collins in King's College Chapel.

At the time of the First English Civil War he was royalist, and in 1643 Edward Montagu, 2nd Earl of Manchester and other commissioners ejected him from the rectory of Fen Ditton. On 9 January 1645 he was deprived of the provostship of King's College by order of parliament, in a visitation of the university by the Earl of Manchester. It appears that he was allowed to retain the sinecure rectory of Milton, and his Regius chair, but the living of Somersham was taken from it. Benjamin Whichcote who succeeded him as Provost found him a stipend. In 1646, on the death of Thomas Howell, Bishop of Bristol, the see was offered to Collins, but he declined it. He lived a retired life in a house in St. Radegund's Lane, opposite Jesus College, Cambridge. There he died on 16 September 1651, at the age of seventy-five. He was buried in the same grave with Robert Hacumblen, in King's College Chapel. A mural monument with a Latin inscription was erected there. He left several sons including John who was a scholar and MP.

== Works ==
His works are:

- A Sermon [on 1 Tim. vi. 3-5] preached at Paules Crosse 1 Nov. 1607, London, 1607, 1608; dedicated to Archbishop Bancroft.
- Increpatio Andreae Eudaemono-Johannis Jesuitae, de infami Parallelo, et renovata assertio Torturae Torti [Cardinal Bellarmin], pro clarissimo domino atque antistito Eliensi [Lancelot Andrewes], auctore S. Collino, Cambridge, 1612; against Andreas Eudaemon-Joannis, it was dedicated to Archbishop George Abbot, whose chaplain he then was, and who had requested him to undertake the work.
- Epphata to F. T.; or, the defence of . . . the Lord Bishop of Elie, Lancelot Andrewes, . . . concerning his answer to Cardinall Bellarmines Apologie; against the slaunderous cauills of a namelesse Adioyner; entitling his booke, in every page of it, A discouerie of many fowle absurdities, falsities, lyes, &c., Cambridge, 1617; dedicated to James I, by whose command he first undertook to write the book. It is in reply to the treatise of Thomas Fitzherbert, published in 1603 under the initials F.T., and entitled a Confutation of certain Absurdities in Lancelot Andrews's Answer to Bellarmine's Apology. Fitzherbert published in 1621 a reply to Collins, entitled The Obmutesce of F. T. to the Epphata of Dr. Collins.
- Latin verses (a) in the university collection on the deaths of Sir Edward and Lady Lewkenor, 1606, (b) before Phineas Fletcher's Locustae, 1627, (c) English verses before Bishop Edward Rainbow's sermon at the funeral of Susan, Countess of Suffolk, first wife of James Howard, 3rd Earl of Suffolk, and daughter of Henry Rich, 1st Earl of Holland, 1649.

== Notes ==
Academic offices
Preceded by John Richardson	Regius Professor of Divinity at Cambridge; 1617–1651	Succeeded by John Arrowsmith
Preceded by William Smith	Provost of King's College, Cambridge; 1615-1645	Succeeded by Benjamin Whichcote
