= William Archer Porter =

William Archer Porter (c. 1825 – 16 July 1890) was a British lawyer and educationist who served as the Principal of Government Arts College, Kumbakonam and tutor and secretary to the Maharaja of Mysore.

== Early life and education ==
Porter was born in Drumlee, Castlewellan, Co. Down, Ireland in the year 1825, the eldest son of Rev. James Porter, Presbyterian minister, and the brother of (1) James Porter (Master of Peterhouse, Cambridge), (2) Jane Bailie Porter, who married Alexander Crum Brown, the Scottish organic chemist and (3) Margaret Archer Porter, who married Peter Tait (physicist). He was educated at Glasgow University from 1841 to 1845 and entered Trinity College, Cambridge in 1845. Migrating to Peterhouse, he graduated BA in 1849 as 3rd Wrangler and was admitted as a fellow of Peterhouse.

== Career ==
Porter practised as a tutor from 1855 to 1856 when he joined Lincoln's Inn. Porter was called to the bar in 1859. Porter served as an equity draftsman and conveyancer from 1859 to 1863, when he moved to India to take over as headmaster of the Provincial School, Kumbakonam.

Porter served as the headmaster of the Provincial School from 1863 to 1873 and was instrumental in its elevation to graduate college. Porter is, however, best remembered for having served as the Principal of the Government Arts College, Kumbakonam from 1874 to 1878. He is considered to be the best-ever principal of the college. During this time, Porter also occasionally acted as the Principal of the Presidency College, Madras. In 1878, Porter was appointed tutor to Chamarajendra Wadiyar X, the prince of the Kingdom of Mysore and served from 1878 to 1882.

== Later life and death ==
Porter returned to the United Kingdom in 1882 and died at Edinburgh on 16 July 1890.

== Family ==
His sister Margaret Porter married Peter Guthrie Tait. They were parents to John Guthrie Tait, Frederick Guthrie Tait and William Archer Porter Tait.
