= Andy Parker (physicist) =

British physicist

Andy Parker FInstP CPhys

Master of Peterhouse, Cambridge
- Incumbent
- Assumed office 2023
- Preceded by: Bridget Kendall

Personal details
- Born: Michael Andrew Parker; 1956 (age 69–70) Bristol, England
- Education: Pembroke College, Oxford; University College London

Michael Andrew Parker (born 1956) is a British physicist and academic. He is Professor of High Energy Physics at the University of Cambridge. He is the incumbent Master of Peterhouse, Cambridge, having succeeded Bridget Kendall in 2023. Parker is involved with CERN's Large Hadron Collider project, and was previously the head of the department of Physics at the University of Cambridge, the Cavendish Laboratory.

== Early life and education ==
Parker was born in Bristol and attended Queen Elizabeth's Hospital, Bristol. He graduated in 1978 with a Class II degree in Physics from Pembroke College, Oxford. He then obtained a PhD in particle physics from University College London.

== Career ==
Parker began working at CERN as a summer student, and was a permanent member of staff from 1982 until 1989. Parker was heavily involved in the ATLAS experiment at the CERN Large Hadron Collider, which was responsible for the discovery of the Higgs boson in 2012. He has continued his association with CERN since, and has sat on numerous committees and advisory panels.

Parker began working at the University of Cambridge in 1989, becoming a fellow of Peterhouse. He was appointed Professor of Physics in 2004 and became head of the Cavendish Laboratory, the university's department of physics, in 2013. He remained in this post until 2023, when he was succeeded by Mete Atatüre.

In addition to his work with CERN and with the Cavendish Laboratory, Parker has worked with the Addenbrooke's Hospital Department of Oncology on applying particle physics software solutions to radiotherapy.

In 2023, it was announced that Parker was to succeed Bridget Kendall as Master of Peterhouse, Cambridge. He was formally appointed Master in July 2023.
