= The Historical Novel =

1924 book by Herbert Butterfield

- Author: Herbert Butterfield
- Language: English
- Published: 1924

The Historical Novel is a 1924 book by Herbert Butterfield. It originated in an undergraduate essay and gained the Le Bas Prize for Butterfield. It was originally published by Cambridge University Press, one of the conditions for the prize.

== Summary ==
The work was Butterfield's first publication. It developed from the embryo of a paper, presented to the Peterhouse History Society in the Michaelmas term, which he then expanded.

It examines the relationship between the form of the historical novel on the one hand and the formal study of history on the other. It explores the style of historical fictions, the way in which they engage with evidence (and how that differs from the orthodox historical method) and the extent to which such a form of writing affects mainstream historical scholarship itself.

Butterfield sees the historical novel as a form which is a kind of 'fusion' of other styles and approaches. In particular, he sees a potential in it for a form of historical empathy that can provide deep insights into the motivations behind the actions of historical protagonists such as Napoleon; it can also be used to marshal a sense of nationalistic or patriot feeling becoming, itself, a "maker of history" rather than merely a reflector or mirror of the past. One of its purposes, according to Butterfield, was to help us 'feel' a particular epoch of the past in ways in which traditional historical writing might not because of the different role and importance of the imagination in the case of the historical novel. Another important element of historical fiction for Butterfield was its role in bringing to light the existence of uncertainty in human affairs as lived by real people: the historian, in his view, tends to have a retrospective reach which draws out trajectories and processes over time, but the characters in a historical novel live as real human beings do, being only aware of probabilities and potential situations rather than knowing precisely where certain events and phenomena are headed.

The work did not display Butterfield's later detestation of the form of the historical novel; later on, moreover, he referred to the arguments in his first publication in disparaging terms, arguing that it was 'a bad book'.
