= Margareta Burkill =

German-born British refugee worker

- Born: 1 December 1896; Germany
- Died: 14 June 1984 (aged 87); Cambridge, England
- Education: Newnham College, Cambridge (1917–1920)
- Children: 3
- Parent(s): Dr Adolf Braun and Bertha Nathansohn

Notes
- Taken from the biography by Rosemary Pattenden of Greta Burkill, 'Greta Burkill: Mother to Thousands' Peterhouse Annual Record 2012/2013 and 2015/2016.

Margareta "Greta" Burkill born Margareta Braun (1 December 1896 – 14 June 1984) was a German-born British refugee worker who was a member of the Cambridge Children's Refugee Committee. They brought hundreds of children to the UK from 1933 onwards on the Kindertransport. She later became an Emeritus Fellow of Wolfson College.

== Life ==
Burkill was born in Berlin in 1896. Her father was an Austrian journalist who worked in Germany, subsequently a newspaper editor in Nuremberg and, after the First World War when he acquired German nationality, a socialist member of the Weimar Reichstag. She was educated in Bavaria, St Petersburg and, after her parents divorced and her Russian-born mother remarried an Englishman, at Harrogate Ladies' College. From 1917 she was a student at Newnham College, Cambridge.

In 1920 she married Bertram Martin Wilson (1896–1935), a mathematician at the University of Liverpool, and in 1928 after their divorce, wed his superior, John Charles Burkill, a mathematics professor there. He had been known as John or Charlie but she insisted that he use the name of Charles. In the following year her husband took up a position at Peterhouse, Cambridge's oldest college. In 1929 the newly weds moved to Cambridge where she spent the remainder of her adult life .

In 1933 she became involved with the efforts to get refugees out of Germany. She is credited with arranging for hundreds to be refugees in Britain This was as part of the Kindertransport however many of those help were older and their studies had been interrupted by changes in Nazi Germany. Two of the refugees became noted mathematicians Harry Reuter and Harry Burkill, whom the Burkills unofficially adopted.

In the 1950s Mrs Burkill founded a 'Junior Graduate Club' (later the Cambridge University Graduate Union) for postgraduate students of the University of Cambridge and a Society for Visiting Scholars, for the spouses of academics visiting that University. In 1964 she also founded Millington Road Nursery in Cambridge.

She was an energetic fund raiser for many different causes including for a third foundation for women in Cambridge which admitted its first students in October 1954 as 'New College' (now renamed 'Murray Edwards' College), for her alma mater (Newnham College), for Wolfson College and for the Society for the Protection of Science and Learning (now known as the Council for At-Risk Academics, CARA)

In 1980 the Imperial War Museum recorded a verbal history of her life to 1945.

== Death and legacy ==
Burkill died in Cambridge in 1984. Her husband put her papers in order regarding her work with refugees and they are held in Cambridge University Library. He survived her until 1993.

The Cambridge Children's Refugee Committeeis a subject of study for British school children. In 2017 her alma mater Newnham had an exhibition of the work by the Cambridge Children’s Refugee Committee. A biography of the life of Mrs Burkill entitled 'Greta Burkill: Mother to Thousands' appears in the Peterhouse Annual Records of 2012/2013 pp. 1–138 and 2015/2016 pp. 1–134.
