= John Charles Burkill =

English mathematician (1900–1993)

John Charles Burkill FRS (1 February 1900 – 6 April 1993) was an English mathematician who worked on analysis and introduced the Burkill integral.

== Career ==
Burkill was born in Holt, Norfolk, and educated at St Paul's School and Trinity College, Cambridge, where he won the Smith's Prize. He became a research fellow at Trinity in 1922, and two years later was appointed Professor of Pure Mathematics at Liverpool University. In 1929, he returned to Cambridge to take up a position as Reader in Mathematical Analysis, as a fellow not of Trinity but of Peterhouse. In 1948, he won the Adams Prize, and was elected a fellow of the Royal Society in 1953. He was Master of Peterhouse from 1968 to 1973. His doctoral students included Frederick Gehring.

== Private life ==
In 1928 he married Margareta Braun, who was born in Germany but educated at Newnham College, Cambridge. Her father was German and her mother was Russian. Burkill and his wife had three children of their own, but Margareta arranged for hundreds of refugee children to come to Britain and some joined their household. Two became noted academics. After Margareta's death in 1984 Burkill lived in Sheffield, where his adopted son Harry was based, and died there in 1993.

== Selected publications ==
- The Lebesgue Integral, Cambridge University Press 1951 2004 pbk edition
- The Theory of ordinary differential equations, Interscience, Oliver and Boyd 1956
- Mathematical Scholarship Problems, with H. M. Cundy, Cambridge University Press 1961
- First course in mathematical analysis, Cambridge University Press 1962; reprint of 1978 pbk edition
- A second course in mathematical analysis, with Harry Burkill, Cambridge University Press, 1970; 1980 1st pbk edition; 2002 pbk edition

Academic offices
Preceded by Herbert Butterfield	Master of Peterhouse, Cambridge; 1968–1973	Succeeded by Grahame Clark
