= Leonard Mawe =

English bishop (1552–1629)

Leonard Maw (sometimes seen as "Mawe" (c. 1552 – 1629) was a Bishop of Bath and Wells and a Master of Peterhouse, Cambridge and Trinity College, Cambridge.

== Life ==
He was born in Rendlesham, Suffolk, the son of Simon Maw (sometimes seen as "Mawe") born Epworth, Lincolnshire, c. 1531 and Margery Wylde born Selby, Yorkshire, c. 1522.

He gained a BA degree from Peterhouse in 1592 and was elected a fellow in 1594, later becoming Master of Peterhouse on 16 November 1617. In 1621, he served as Prebend of Wells. He also served as Vice-Chancellor to the University of Cambridge from 1621 to 1622. Together with Matthew Wren, he accompanied Prince Charles to Madrid in search of a bride (the so-called Spanish Match). On acceding to the throne, Charles rewarded him by appointing him Master of Trinity College, Cambridge, which post he held until his death in Chiswick in 1629. From 1628 to 1629, he was also Bishop of Bath and Wells.

Academic offices
Preceded by John Richardson	Master of Trinity College, Cambridge; 1625–1629	Succeeded by Samuel Brooke
Preceded by Thomas Turner	Master of Peterhouse, Cambridge; 1617–1625	Succeeded by Matthew Wren
Church of England titles
Preceded by William Laud	Bishop of Bath and Wells; 1628–1629	Succeeded by Walter Curle
