= The Forum (radio programme) =

BBC radio programme

- Running time: 52 minutes
- Language: English
- Home station: BBC World Service
- Hosted by: Bridget Kendall
- Recording studio: Broadcasting House
- Original release: 6 April 2008
- Website: bbcworldservice.com/forum
- Podcast: The Forum podcast The Forum 60 second idea podcast

The Forum, the BBC World Service's flagship discussion programme, brings together prominent thinkers from different disciplines and different parts of the world with the aim of creating stimulating discussion informed by highly distinct academic, artistic, and cultural perspectives. The World Service broadcasts the programme on Saturdays at 2106 GMT and repeats it on Sundays at 0906 GMT and on Mondays at 0206 GMT. BBC Radio 4 also broadcasts an edited 30-minute version of the programme.

== Format ==
Each episode of The Forum brings together three thinkers, leading figures from different academic and artistic disciplines. A typical line-up might include a scientist, a writer or other artist, and a philosopher or cultural thinker.

Each guest is questioned by the presenter about their latest big idea, a topic area that is of particular interest to them and in which they are a particular expert. During the course of each section the other guests are invited to contribute with criticisms, insights and support of their own.

=== Sixty Second Idea ===
Each week one of the guests is invited to present an idea in sixty seconds that they believe will make the world a better place. These ideas are not always practicable, but they are frequently entertaining and insightful. The 60 Second Idea and the discussion it produces is released as a podcast.

== History ==
The first episode of the show was broadcast on the BBC World Service on 6 April 2008. It has been broadcast every week since then.

The Forum was founded by Emily Kasriel, who was the program's Executive Producer for the show's first four years and occasionally presented it, as well as painting illustrations for The Forum's website.

== Presenters ==
The programme's presenter, who has been part of the show since its inception, is former BBC diplomatic correspondent Bridget Kendall.

=== Guest presenters ===
- Zeinab Badawi
- Martin Rees
- Rana Mitter
- Tim Marlow
- Angie Hobbs
- Marcus du Sautoy
- Ritula Shah

== Distribution ==
The Forum is broadcast through the BBC World Service and its international broadcasting partners. The show is also available online, to download and as a podcast. All previous shows are archived online.

== Previous guests ==
Previous guests include:

- Nobel Prize–winning biologist John Sulston
- Political scientist Joseph Nye
- Former Afghan finance minister Ashraf Ghani
- British astrophysicist Lord Martin Rees
- Nigerian novelist Chimamanda Ngozi Adichie
- Canadian writer Naomi Klein
- Egyptian writer Alaa Al Aswany
- Ghanaian philosopher Kwame Anthony Appiah
- Argentinian architect Cesar Pelli
- US psychologist Steven Pinker
- South African judge Albie Sachs
- Polish Canadian writer Eva Hoffman
- British philosopher John Gray
- Mathematician Marcus du Sautoy
