= Francis Barnes (philosopher) =

English philosopher

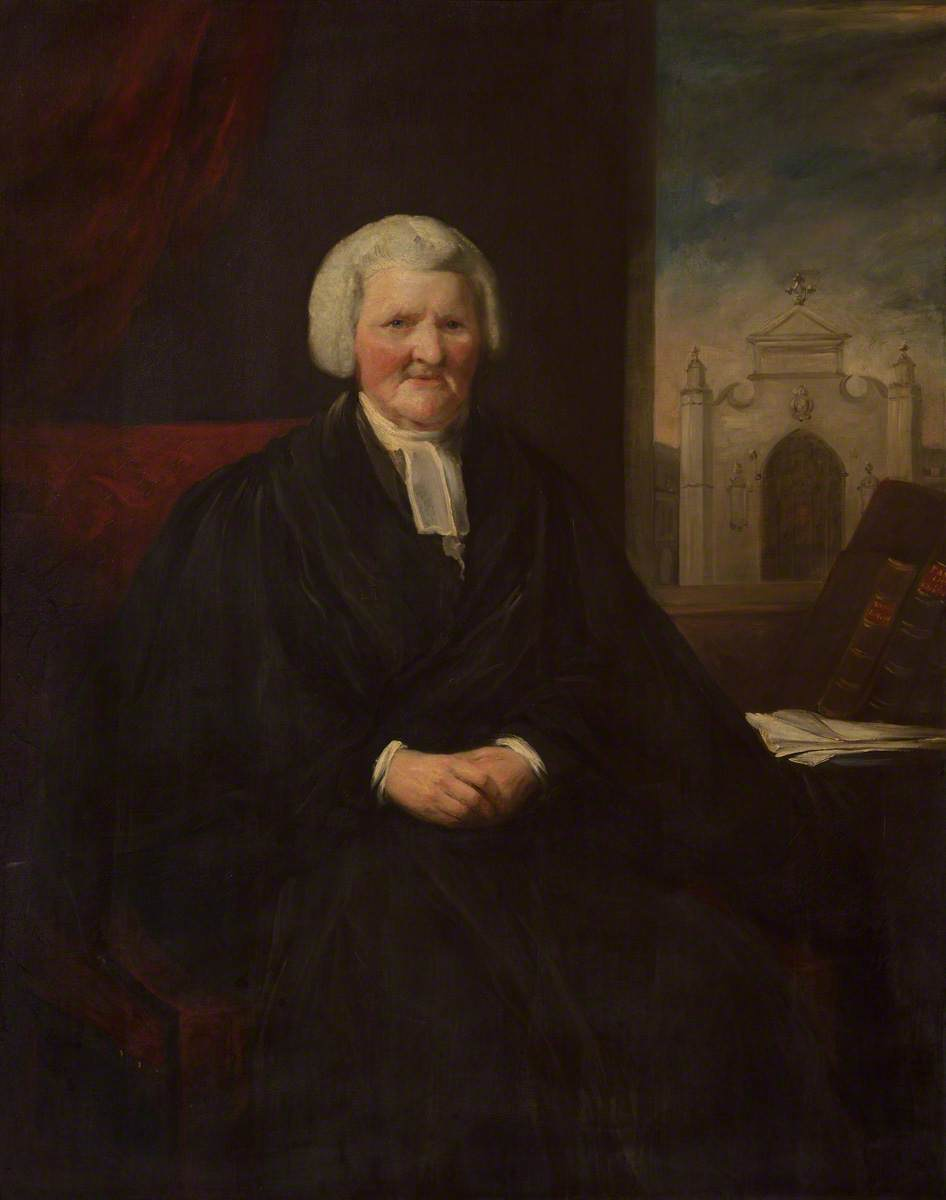
Francis Barnes by John Jackson

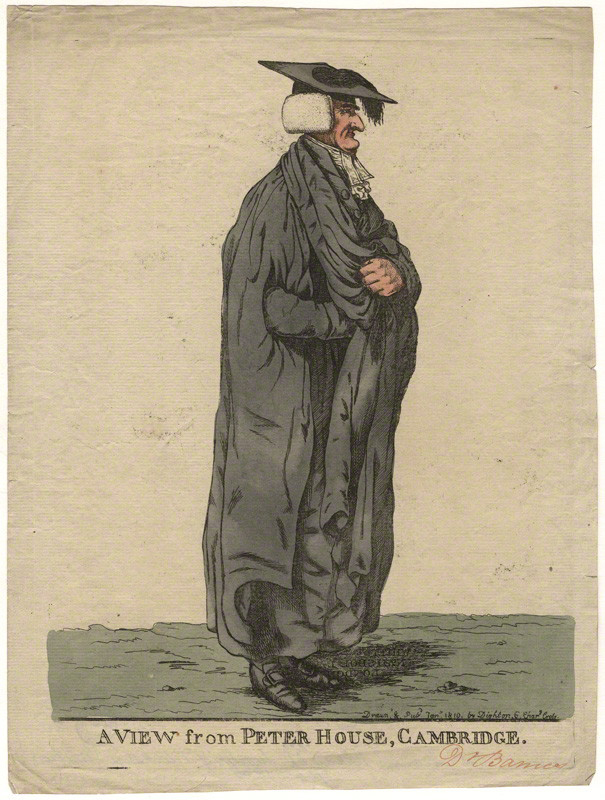
by and published by Robert Dighton, hand-coloured etching, published January 1810

Francis Barnes (13 January 1744 - 1 May 1838) was an English philosopher and a Knightbridge Professor of Philosophy.

== Early life and education ==
Barnes was born in Bolton-le-Sands, Lancashire the son of Joseph Barnes a yeoman farmer. He attended local schools at Kellett and Silverdale, but his teachers noticed his abilities and he won a place at Eton College. His family were not wealthy and it was said that he travelled to Eton seated behind his father on one of the farm's horses. After finishing his schooling he went up to King's College, Cambridge. He graduated in 1764 at the age of twenty.

== Career ==
Barnes took a Bachelor in Divinity and Doctor of Divinity at Cambridge in preparation for a career in the church. He was ordained in 1769 held various livings in Norwich and Wattisham, Suffolk, and became Vice-Provost of King's.

In 1788 Barnes became Vice-Chancellor of Cambridge University as well as Master of Peterhouse, Cambridge. His appointment to the latter post was highly contentious. He was only nominated to prevent the election of another man and had not particularly wanted the position. It was said by a Peterhouse Fellow that he was unsuited to "any duty which required the exercise of high notions of morality, and a careful regard to what is just, decent, and venerable". He held the Mastership for over 50 years.

In 1813 Barnes was elected to the Knightbridge Professorship of Moral Philosophy. As with his appointment to Master of Peterhouse, this election has been the subject of controversy. There were four electors for the vacant Professorship: the Vice-Chancellor, the Regius and the Lady Margaret's Professors of Divinity, and the Master of Peterhouse. The casting vote belonged to the last of these if the vote was split. There is a popular story that Barnes, as well as being Master of Peterhouse, was Vice-Chancellor; that as Vice-Chancellor, he nominated himself for the Professorship; that as Master of Peterhouse he seconded himself; and that, by two original votes and a casting vote, he elected himself to the Professorship. The story is almost certainly apocryphal. Although Barnes had been Vice-Chancellor in 1788 and 1807, he did not hold the post in 1813, the year of his election to the Knightbridge. As was common for incumbents of the chair in the eighteenth and early nineteenth centuries, he seems to have given no lectures, and did not publish anything.

Barnes had the distinction of being the last wearer of the eighteenth century wig in Cambridge University. He died in 1838 at the age of 95 and is buried in the chapel at Peterhouse.

Academic offices
Preceded by Edmund Law	Master of Peterhouse, Cambridge; 1788–1838	Succeeded by William Hodgson
