= Herbert Butterfield =

English historian and philosopher (1900–1979)

Sir Herbert Butterfield FBA
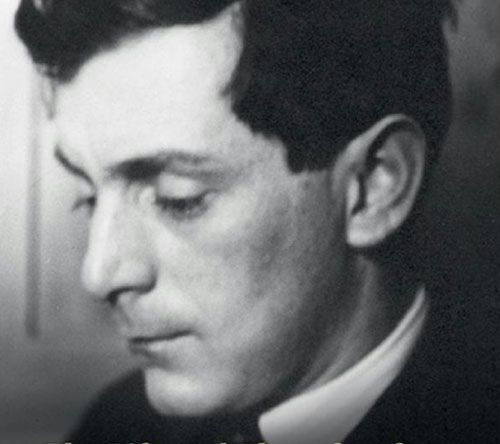
- Herbert Butterfield
- Born: 7 October 1900; Oxenhope, England
- Died: 20 July 1979 (aged 78); Sawston, England
- Title: Master of Peterhouse, Cambridge (1955–1968); Vice-Chancellor of the University of Cambridge (1959–1961)
- Spouse: Pamela Crawshaw (m. 1929)

Academic background
- Education: Peterhouse, Cambridge
- Influences: Lord Acton; J. B. Bury; Leopold von Ranke; Harold Temperley; G. M. Trevelyan; P. C. Vellacott

Academic work
- Discipline: History; philosophy
- Sub-discipline: Diplomatic history; historiography; history of science; intellectual history; philosophy of history; political history
- School or tradition: English school; Methodism
- Institutions: Peterhouse, Cambridge
- Doctoral students: Patrick Cosgrave; Sir John Elliott; Werner E. Mosse; J. G. A. Pocock; Karl W. Schweizer; Martin Wight
- Notable works: The Whig Interpretation of History (1931); The Origins of Modern Science (1949)
- Notable ideas: Whig history
- Influenced: A. Rupert Hall; Thomas Kuhn; J. H. Plumb; Karl W. Schweizer

Sir Herbert Butterfield FBA (7 October 1900 – 20 July 1979) was an English historian and philosopher of history, who was Regius Professor of Modern History and Vice-Chancellor of the University of Cambridge. He is remembered chiefly for a short volume early in his career entitled The Whig Interpretation of History (1931) and for his Origins of Modern Science (1949). Butterfield turned increasingly to historiography and man's developing view of the past. Butterfield was a devout Christian and reflected at length on Christian influences in historical perspectives.

Butterfield thought that individual personalities were more important than great systems of government or economics in historical study. His Christian beliefs in personal sin, salvation and providence were a great influence in his writings, a fact he freely admitted. At the same time, Butterfield's early works emphasised the limits of a historian's conclusions, including moral conclusions.

== Biography ==
Butterfield was born on 7 October 1900 in Oxenhope, West Yorkshire, and was raised a devout Methodist, which he remained for life. Despite his humble origins, receiving his education at the Trade and Grammar School in Keighley, in 1919 he won a scholarship to study at Peterhouse, Cambridge, graduating with a BA in 1922, followed by an MA four years later. Butterfield was a fellow at Cambridge from 1928 to 1979 and in the 1950s, he was a fellow of the Institute for Advanced Study in Princeton, New Jersey. He was Master of Peterhouse (1955–1968), Vice-Chancellor of the University (1959–1961) and Regius Professor of Modern History (1963–1968). Butterfield served as editor of the Cambridge Historical Journal from 1938 to 1955 and was knighted in 1968.

He married Edith Joyce Crawshaw in 1929 and had three children. He died on 20 July 1979.

== Work ==
Butterfield's main interests were historiography, the history of science, 18th-century constitutional history, Christianity and history as well as the theory of international politics. He delivered the Gifford Lectures at the University of Glasgow in 1965. As a deeply religious Protestant, Butterfield was highly concerned with religious issues, but he did not believe that historians could uncover the hand of God in history. At the height of the Cold War, he warned that conflicts between self-righteous value systems could be catastrophic:

The greatest menace to our civilization is the conflict between giant organized systems of self-righteousness – each only too delighted to find that the other is wicked – each only too glad that the sins of the other give it pretext for still deeper hatred.

=== The Whig Interpretation of History ===
Butterfield's book, The Whig Interpretation of History (1931), became a classic for history students and is still widely read. Butterfield had in mind especially the historians of his own country but his criticism of the retrospective creation of a line of progress toward the glorious present can be and has subsequently been applied generally. The "Whig interpretation of history" is now a general label applied to various historical interpretations.

Butterfield found the Whig interpretation of history objectionable because it warps the past to see it in terms of the issues of the present and attempts to squeeze the contending forces of the past into a form that reminds us of ourselves. Butterfield argued that the historian must seek the ability to see events as they were perceived by those who lived through them. Butterfield wrote that "Whiggishness" is too handy a "rule of thumb... by which the historian can select and reject, and can make his points of emphasis".

He also wrote about how simple pick-and-choose history misses the point, "Very strange bridges are used to make the passage from one state of things to another; we may lose sight of them in our surveys of general history, but their discovery is the glory of historical research. History is not the study of origins; rather it is the analysis of all the mediations by which the past was turned into our present".

=== Christianity and History ===
Butterfield's 1949 book Christianity and History, asks if history provides answers to the meaning of life, answering in the negative:

- "So the purpose of life is not in the far future, nor, as we so often imagine, around the next corner, but the whole of it is here and now, as fully as ever it will be on this planet."
- "If there is a meaning in history, therefore, it lies not in the systems and organizations that are built over long periods, but in something more essentially human, something in each personality considered for mundane purposes as an end in himself."
- "I have nothing to say at the finish except that if one wants a permanent rock in life and goes deep enough for it, it is difficult for historical events to shake it. There are times when we can never meet the future with sufficient elasticity of mind, especially if we are locked in the contemporary systems of thought. We can do worse than remember a principle which both gives us a firm Rock and leaves us the maximum elasticity for our minds: the principle: Hold to Christ, and for the rest be totally uncommitted."

Butterfield and his Anglo-Catholic contemporary, Christopher Dawson, have been referred to as prominent "providential" historians.

=== The Origins of Modern Science ===
Butterfield's 1949 book The Origins of Modern Science was an influential study of the Scientific Revolution and important work in history of science.

According to Brian Vickers, Butterfield makes simplistic generalisations which "seem unworthy of a serious historian". Vickers considers the book a late example of the earliest stage of modern analysis of the history of Renaissance magic in relation to the development of science, when magic was largely dismissed as being "entertaining but irrelevant".

== Prizes and accolades ==
In 1922, Butterfield was awarded the University Member's Prize for English Essay, writing on the subject of English novelist Charles Dickens and the way in which the author straddled the fields of history and literature.

In 1923, Butterfield won the Le Bas Prize for his first publication, The Historical Novel; the work was published in 1924.

Also in 1924, Butterfield won the Prince Consort Prize for a work on the problem of peace in Europe between 1806 and 1808. At the same time, he was given the Seeley Medal.

== Bibliography ==
- The Historical Novel, 1924.
- The Peace Tactics of Napoleon, 1806-1808, 1929.
- The Whig Interpretation of History, London: G. Bell, 1931.
- Napoleon, Duckworth, Great Lives series, 1939.
- The Statecraft of Machiavelli, 1940.
- The Englishman and His History, 1944.
- Lord Acton, 1948.
- Christianity and History, 1949.
- George III, Lord North and the People, 1779-80, 1949. LCCN 50-1588
- The Origins of Modern Science, 1300-1800, 1949.
- History and Human Relations, 1951. Contains the essay "Moral Judgments in History".
- The Reconstruction of an Historical Episode: The History of the Enquiry into the Origins of the Seven Years' War, 1951.
- Liberty in the Modern World, 1951.
- Christianity in European History, 1952.
- Christianity, Diplomacy and War, 1953.
- Man on His Past: The Study of the History of Historical Scholarship, 1955.
- George III and the Historians, 1957, revised edition, 1959.
- International Conflict in the Twentieth Century, 1960. (1st edition, LCCN 60-7954) Butterfield, Herbert (1976). 2nd edition. Greenwood Press. ISBN 0837175690. LCCN 74006777.
- History and Man's Attitude to the Past, 1961.
- The Universities and Education Today, 1962. LCCN 63-2887
- The present state of historical scholarship, 1965. LCCN 65-4621
- Diplomatic Investigations: Essays in the Theory of International Politics (co-edited with Martin Wight), 1966. Butterfield, Herbert; Wight, Martin (10 October 2019). 2019 pbk reprint. Oxford University Press. ISBN 9780198836469. LCCN 2019941463.
- Magna Carta in the Historiography of the Sixteenth and Seventeenth Centuries, 1969. LCCN 73-455486 ISBN 0901024015
- The Discontinuities between the Generations in History, 1971. LCCN 72-75307 ISBN 0521085802
- The Politicization of Society: Essays, 1979. LCCN 78-17491 ISBN 0913966487
- Writings on Christianity and History (edited by Carl Thomas McIntire, 1979) ISBN 0195024540
- The Origins of History (edited by A. Watson) (1981). His final thoughts on history, emphasizing the role of religion.
- Essays on the History of Science (edited by Karl W. Schweizer, 1998) LCCN 98-40049 ISBN 0773482644
- The International Thought of Herbert Butterfield (edited by Karl W. Schweizer and Paul Sharp, 2006) ISBN 0230001661

== See also ==
- British Committee on the Theory of International Politics

== Notes ==
Academic offices
Preceded by Paul Cairn Vellacott	Master of Peterhouse, Cambridge; 1955–1968	Succeeded by John Charles Burkill
Preceded by The Lord Adrian	Vice-Chancellor of the University of Cambridge; 1959–1961	Succeeded by Sir Ivor Jennings
Preceded by David Knowles	Regius Professor of Modern History at the University of Cambridge; 1963–1968	Succeeded by Owen Chadwick
