= Bridget Kendall =

English journalist

Bridget Kendall MBE HonFBA
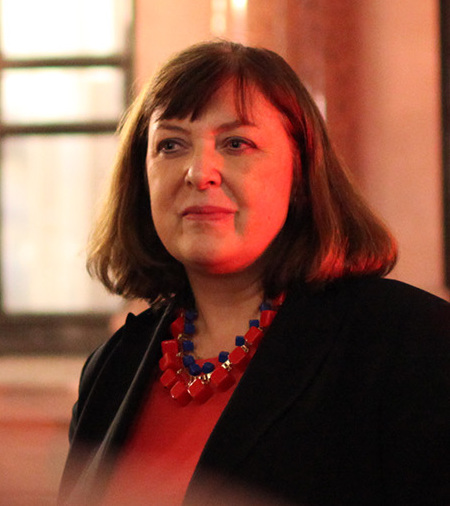
- Kendall in 2015

Master of Peterhouse, Cambridge
- In office 2016–2023
- Preceded by: Professor Adrian Dixon
- Succeeded by: Andy Parker (physicist)

Personal details
- Born: 27 April 1956 (age 70) Abingdon, Oxfordshire, England
- Relatives: David George Kendall (father)
- Education: Lady Margaret Hall, Oxford; St Antony's College, Oxford; Harvard University

Bridget Kendall (born 27 April 1956) is an English journalist who was the BBC's Diplomatic correspondent working for the corporation's radio and television networks. From 2016 to 2023, she was Master of Peterhouse, Cambridge: the first woman to head the college.

== Early life and education ==
Kendall was born in 1956 at Abingdon, Oxfordshire, a daughter of statistician Professor David George Kendall and Diana (née Fletcher). She has two brothers (one of whom is statistician Professor Wilfrid Kendall) and three sisters.

Kendall was educated at Perse School for Girls, a private school in Cambridge. She then read Modern Languages at Lady Margaret Hall, Oxford, and spent two years in Russia on British Council scholarships in 1977 and 1982. Her postgraduate Soviet studies took her from St Antony's College, Oxford to Harvard University, where she spent two years as a Harkness Fellow in the Graduate School of Arts and Sciences.

== Career ==
Kendall joined the BBC in 1983 as a radio production trainee for the BBC World Service. She was the BBC's Moscow correspondent from 1989 to 1994, and developed her background in Russian politics. She was in Moscow to witness the power struggles in the Soviet Communist Party as Mikhail Gorbachev tried to introduce reform, and reported on the break-up of the Soviet Union and the internal conflicts in Chechnya, Georgia and Tajikistan. She sent reports of the attempted coup in August 1991 and covered Boris Yeltsin's rise to power.

Kendall was the BBC's Washington correspondent from 1994, becoming the Corporation's diplomatic correspondent in November 1998. She speaks fluent Russian, and has interviewed world leaders including two interviews with Vladimir Putin live from the Kremlin as part of internet webcasts in March 2001 and July 2006.

She interviewed King Abdullah of Jordan for the BBC later in 2001, and hosted a similar event in Moscow with former Soviet President Gorbachev in 2002. She is the host of the intellectual talk show, The Forum, on BBC World Service radio.

On 1 February 2016, Kendall was elected as the first female Master of Peterhouse, Cambridge. She took up her new post at the college in July, and continues to broadcast for the BBC as an external contributor. She served as Master of Peterhouse until July 2023, and was succeeded by Andy Parker.

== Personal life ==
Kendall married freelance television journalist Nick Worrall in the early 1990s; they later divorced.

== Awards ==
MBE

Kendall received the James Cameron Award for Journalism in 1992 for reports on events in the former Soviet Union, being the first woman to receive that award. Later that year, she won a Bronze Sony Radio Award for "Reporter of the Year" and was appointed a Member of the Order of the British Empire (MBE) in the 1994 New Year Honours.

In 2020, she was elected an Honorary Fellow of the British Academy (Hon FBA), and in 2021 was awarded the David Crystal Award for her work with languages by the Chartered Institute of Linguists.

Academic offices
Preceded by Professor Adrian Dixon	Master of Peterhouse, Cambridge; 2016–present	Incumbent
