= John Richardson (translator) =

English Biblical scholar (c. 1564–1625)

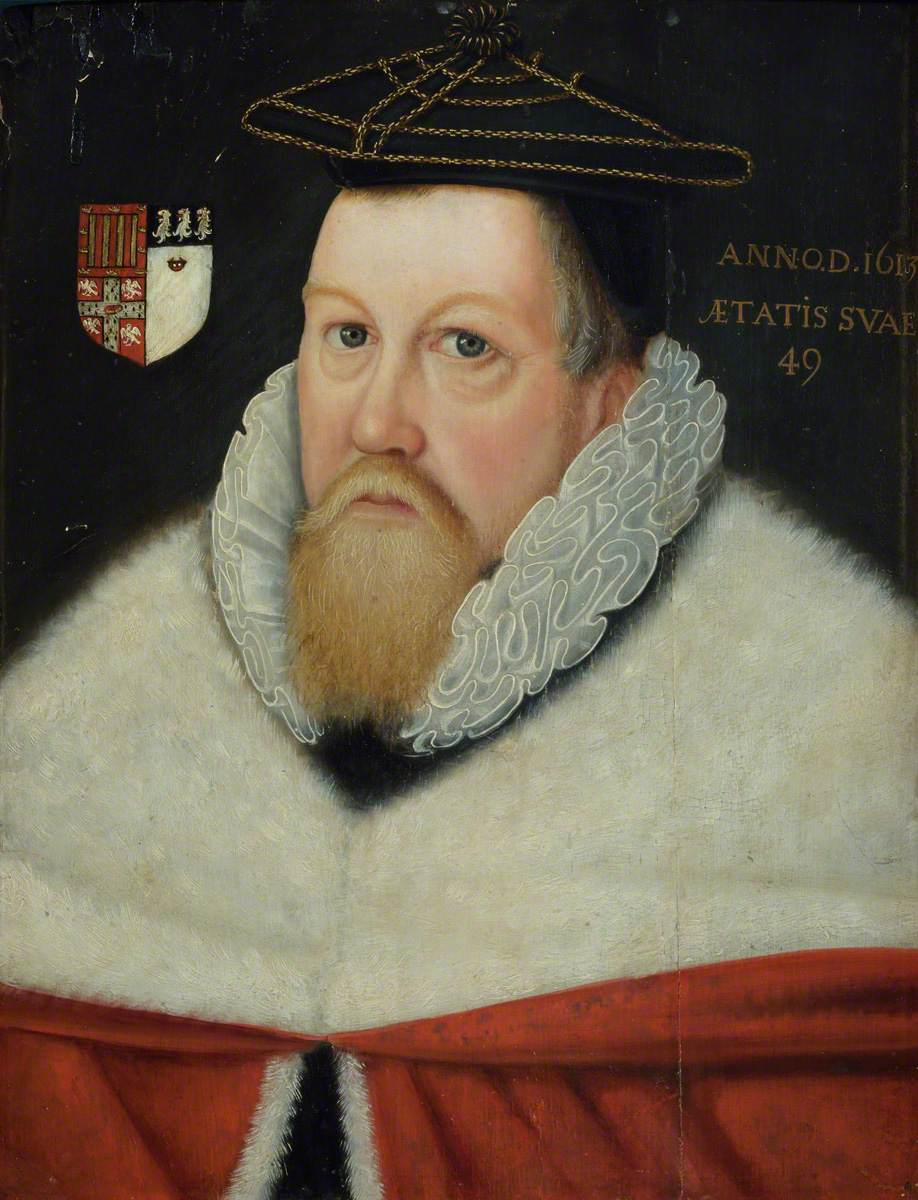
John Richardson

John Richardson (born Linton, Cambridgeshire, c. 1564 – 1625) was a Biblical scholar and a Master of Trinity College, Cambridge from 1615 until his death.

== Life ==
He was born ‘of honest parentage’ at Linton, Cambridgeshire. John Richardson matriculated as a sizar from Clare College, Cambridge in 1578, where he graduated B.A. in 1581. He was afterwards elected to a fellowship at Emmanuel College. He proceeded M.A. in 1585, B.D. in 1592, and D.D. in 1597.

In 1607 he was appointed Regius Professor of Divinity, in succession to Dr. John Overall.

In 1609 he was appointed Master of Peterhouse before accepting in 1615 the same position at Trinity.

Some notes of his Lectiones de Predestinatione are preserved in manuscript in Cambridge University Library (Gg. i. 29, pt. ii.). He and Richard Thomson were among the first of the Cambridge divines who maintained the doctrine Arminianism in opposition to the Calvinists. He resigned in 1617 as a results of increasing anti-Arminian pressure. He then served in 1617 and 1618 as vice-chancellor of the university.

Richardson was a skilled hebraist and he served in the "First Cambridge Company", charged by James I of England with the translation of the books of the Old Testament from the Books of Chronicles to Song of Songs (comprising most of the Ketuvim) for the King James Version of the Bible.

At his death, Richardson left a bequest of £100 to Peterhouse.

== Notes and references ==
=== Sources ===
- Cooper, Thompson (1885). "Richardson, John (d.1625)". Dictionary of National Biography, 1885-1900. Vol. 48. London: Smith, Elder & Co. pp. 227–228.
- Coffey, John (2006). John Goodwin and the Puritan Revolution : Religion and Intellectual Change in Seventeenth-Century England. Woodbridge: The Boydell Press.

Academic offices
Preceded by John Overall	Regius Professor of Divinity at Cambridge; 1606–1617	Succeeded by Samuel Collins
Preceded by Robert Some	Master of Peterhouse, Cambridge; 1609–1615	Succeeded by Thomas Turner
Preceded by Thomas Nevile	Master of Trinity College, Cambridge; 1615–1625	Succeeded by Leonard Mawe
