= Philip Charles Woodland =

Philip Charles Woodland from the Cambridge University, Cambridge, Cambs, UK was named Fellow of the Institute of Electrical and Electronics Engineers (IEEE) in 2013 for contributions to large vocabulary speech recognition.
