= Henry Wilkinson Cookson =

English clergyman and college head

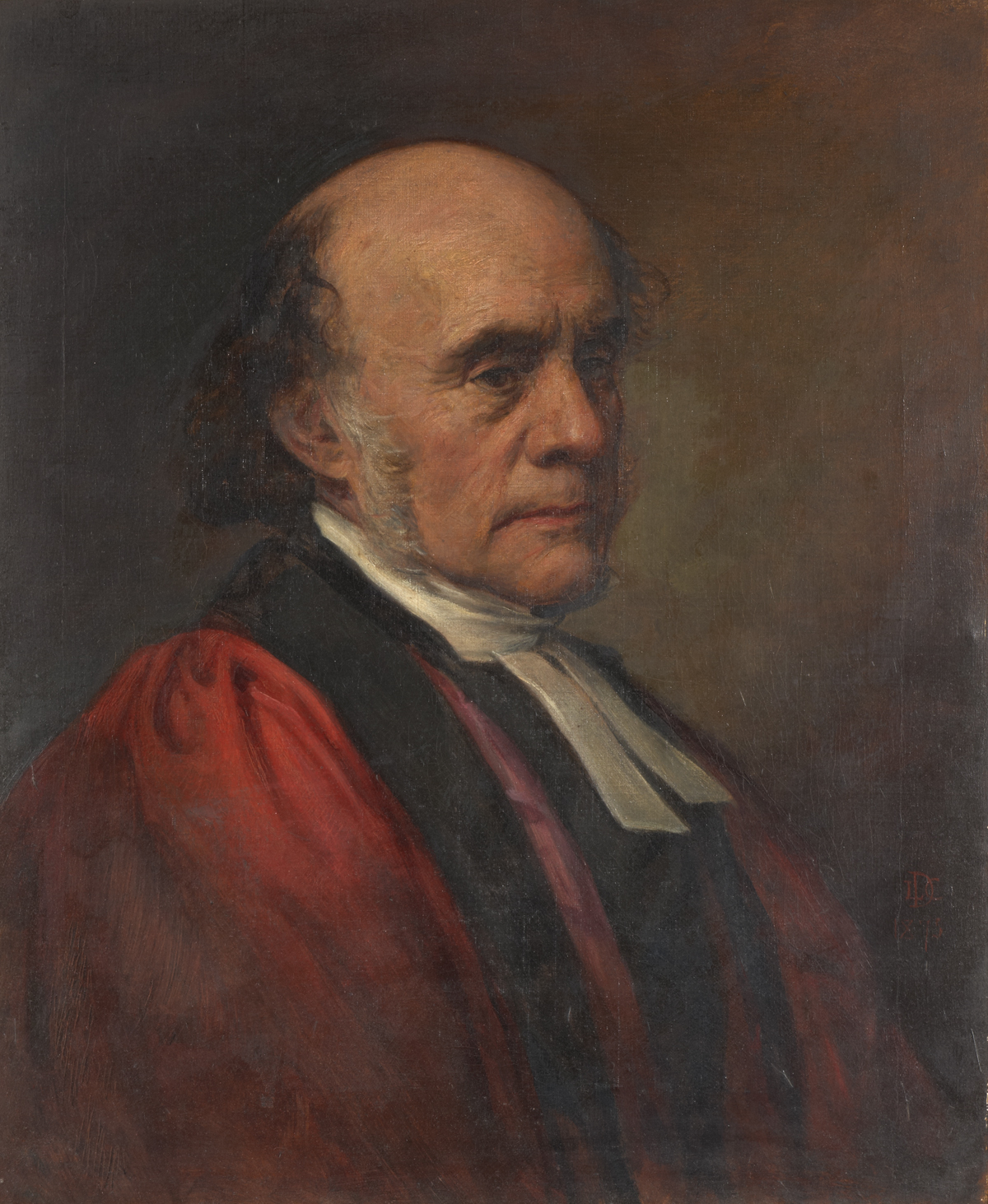
Henry Wilkinson Cookson, portrait by Lowes Cato Dickinson

Henry Wilkinson Cookson (10 April 1810 – 30 September 1876) was an English clergyman and academic, who served as Master of Peterhouse, Cambridge from 1847 until his death.

He was born on 10 April 1810 at Kendal, the sixth son of Thomas and Elizabeth Cookson. William Wordsworth, whose poetry he always admired, was one of his godfathers. He was educated at Kendal Grammar School and at Sedbergh School, then at Peterhouse, Cambridge, matriculating in October 1828, graduating B.A. (7th wrangler) 1832, M.A. 1835, B.D. and D.D. (per lit. reg.) 1848. His private tutors were Henry Philpott and William Hopkins.

He was appointed a Fellow in 1836 and a Tutor in 1839. His pupils included Sir William Thomson (Lord Kelvin). He was Proctor in 1842. In 1847 he succeeded William Hodgson as Master of Peterhouse, and as Rector of Glaston, Rutland, until 1867, when this rectory was by the new college statutes detached from the headship with which it had hitherto been combined. He was elected Vice-Chancellor on five occasions (1848, 1863, 1864, 1872, 1873), and was President of the Cambridge Philosophical Society 1865–66. In 1867 he was offered the bishopric of Lichfield by Lord Derby, but declined it.

In 1855 he married Emily Valence, elder daughter of Gilbert Ainslie, Master of Pembroke College, by whom he had one daughter. He died, after an illness of a few days, on 30 September 1876, in Peterhouse Lodge; and was buried in the churchyard of the college benefice of St Andrew's Church, Cherry Hinton.

Academic offices
Preceded by William Hodgson	Master of Peterhouse, Cambridge; 1847–1876	Succeeded by James Porter
