= Paul Cairn Vellacott =

- Born: 24 May 1891
- Died: 15 November 1954 (aged 63)
- Occupation: Academic
- Known for: Master of Peterhouse, Cambridge

Paul Cairn Vellacott CBE DSO (24 May 1891 – 15 November 1954) served as Headmaster of Harrow School and Master of Peterhouse, Cambridge.

The son of William Edward Vellacott (a Fellow of the Institute of Chartered Accountants who lived at Budleigh Salterton, Devon), he was educated at Marlborough College and Peterhouse, Cambridge, where he studied the Historical Tripos. He served as Headmaster of Harrow School from 1934 to 1939 and Master of Peterhouse from 1939 to 1954.

Vellacott was awarded the Distinguished Service Order and made a Commander of the Order of the British Empire.

On 20 June 1929 he married Hilda Francesca Lubbock, daughter of Sir Nevile Lubbock (1839–1914) and Constance Ann Herschel (daughter of astronomer John Herschel and granddaughter of astronomer William Herschel).

Academic offices
Preceded by Cyril Norwood	Head Master of Harrow School; 1934-1939	Succeeded by Paul Boissier
Academic offices
Preceded by Harold Temperley	Master of Peterhouse, Cambridge; 1939–1954	Succeeded by Herbert Butterfield
