= William Hodgson (Master of Peterhouse, Cambridge) =

English clergyman and college head

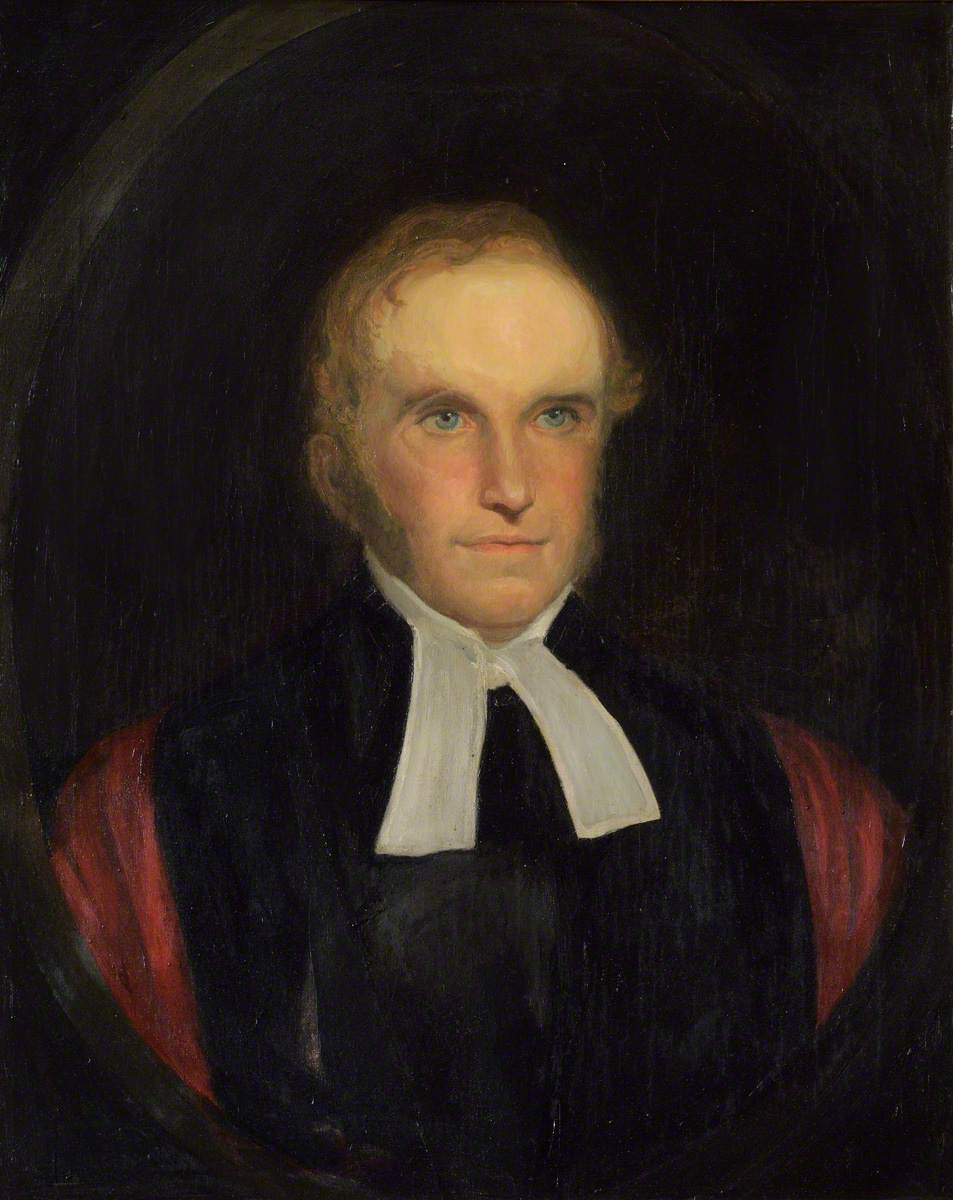
William Hodgson

William Hodgson (died 16 October 1847) was an English clergyman and academic, who served as Master of Peterhouse, Cambridge from 1838 until his death.

The son of a Cumberland farmer, Hodgson entered Peterhouse, Cambridge in 1819, and graduated B.A. (11th wrangler) 1823, M.A. 1826, B.D. 1833, D.D. 1838.

Ordained deacon in 1824 and priest in 1825, he was appointed a Fellow of Peterhouse in 1825, a Tutor, and Master of Peterhouse in 1838. He served as vice-chancellor in 1838–39 and 1843–44.

In the church, Hodgson was Vicar of Cherry Hinton (1836–38) and Rector of Glaston (1838–47).

On 19 July 1838 he married Charlotte Tarleton.

He died on 16 October 1847 in the Master's Lodge at Peterhouse, and was buried in the college chapel.

Academic offices
Preceded by Francis Barnes	Master of Peterhouse, Cambridge; 1838–1847	Succeeded by Henry Wilkinson Cookson
