= Harold Temperley =

English historian (1879–1939)

Harold William Vazeille Temperley, OBE, FBA (20 April 1879 – 11 July 1939) was an English historian, Professor of Modern History at the University of Cambridge from 1931, and Master of Peterhouse, Cambridge.

== Overview ==
Temperley was born in Cambridge, the son of Ernest Temperley, a Fellow and Bursar of Queens' College, Cambridge. He was educated at Sherborne School and King's College, Cambridge, where he obtained a First in History. He became a lecturer at the University of Leeds in 1903, before taking a fellowship at Peterhouse, Cambridge, in 1905.

Temperley's field was modern diplomatic history, and he was heavily involved as editor in the publication of the British Government's official version of the diplomatic history of the early 20th century. He also wrote on George Canning and Eastern European history.

During World War I, Temperley was commissioned into the Fife and Forfar Yeomanry, missing the Gallipoli landings due to illness. He was then seconded to the War Office, working on intelligence and policy in the Balkans. His History of Serbia was published in 1917.

He attended the Paris Peace Conference of 1919 and later worked on an official history of it, on a scheme devised by George Louis Beer and Lord Eustace Percy. He was British representative on the Albanian boundary commission; and was an advisor in 1921 to Arthur Balfour at the League of Nations.

In the compilation of the British Documents on the Origins of the War he collaborated with George Peabody Gooch, (1873–1968), another diplomatic historian and a member of parliament for the Liberal Party from 1906 to 1910. Gooch had spoken out against British policy in the Second Boer War, and was also a historian of Germany; his appointment was designed to give the project a credible independence.

In the event, Temperley and Gooch were constrained financially, and in the use of documents subject to a 'fifty year rule' limitation on their release. To get their own way, they had to employ tactical resignation threats. Lillian Margery Penson (1896–1963) was involved in both this and a later project on the Blue Books.

In 1923 Temperley founded The Cambridge Historical Journal at Cambridge.

Temperley was elected to the American Philosophical Society in 1938.

The historian Herbert Butterfield was a student of Temperley. He commented later in life on how the ageing Temperley and Charles Webster, an equally aged historian, dominated the college Combination Room, "like booming giants, cumbersome and dangerous to crockery, bulging with warmth and good feeling, yet capable of overbearingness – terrible lions if you trod on their tales [sic]". Tempeley also influenced British Prime Minister Neville Chamberlain's European foreign policy, including appeasement of the Axis Powers and the Munich Agreement.

== Works ==
- The Life of Canning (1905)
- Senates and Upper Chambers (London: Chapman & Hall, 1910)
- History of Serbia (London: Bell, 1917); 2nd edition, 1919
- Frederic the Great and Kaiser Joseph: An Episode of War and Diplomacy in the Eighteenth Century (1915)
- A History of the Peace Conference of Paris, (6 vols) 1920–24;
- The Foreign Policy of Canning, 1822–1827 (1925)
- British Documents on the Origins of the War, 1898–1914 (1926–1938) with George Peabody Gooch
  - I. The End of British Isolation
  - II. The Anglo-Japanese Alliance and the Franco-British Entente
  - III. The Testing of the Entente, 1904-6
  - IV. The Anglo-Russian Rapprochement, 1903-7
  - V. The Near East: The Macedonian Problem and the Annexation of Bosnia, 1903-9
  - VI. Anglo-German Tension: Armaments and Negotiation, 1907–12
  - VII. The Agadir Crisis
  - VIII. Arbitration, Neutrality and Security
  - IX.1. The Balkan Wars: The Prelude. The Tripoli War
  - IX.2 The Balkan Wars: The League and Turkey
  - X.1 The Near and Middle East on the Eve of War'
  - X.2 The Last Years of Peace
  - XI. The Outbreak of War
- Europe in the Nineteenth Century (1927) with A. J. Grant; textbook continually updated to 1950 as Europe in the Nineteenth and Twentieth Centuries (6th ed. revised, 1952)
- England and the Near East: The Crimea (1936)
- The Foundation of British Foreign Policy (1938) with L. M. Penson
- A Century of Diplomatic Blue Books, 1814–1914 (1938) with L. M. Penson
- Diaries 1916–1939, edited by T.G. Otte. Ashgate Publishing (An Historian in Peace and War: The Diaries of Harold Temperley) (2014) ISBN 0754663930

== See also ==
- Ernest Satow who corresponded with Temperley
- Herbert Butterfield had Temperley as his mentor

== Notes ==
Academic offices
Preceded by Sir William Birdwood	Master of Peterhouse, Cambridge; 1938–1939	Succeeded by Paul Cairn Vellacott
