= Evelyn White =

Evelyn White may refer to:

- Evelyn C. White (born 1954), American writer and editor.
- Evelyn Davidson White (1921–2007), American author, vocal teacher and choral director

== See also ==
- Hugh Evelyn-White (1884–1924), classicist and archaeologist
- Charles Harold Evelyn-White (1850–1938), English clergyman and antiquarian
