= William Dowsing =

English puritan iconoclast

William Dowsing (1596–1668), also known as "Smasher Dowsing", was an English puritan, and a particularly notable iconoclast at the time of the English Civil War. He was mainly active in East Anglia.

== Life ==
William Dowsing was born in Laxfield, Suffolk, the son of Wollfran and Johane Dowsing of that place. In August 1643 Edward Montagu, 2nd Earl of Manchester appointed Dowsing provost-marshal of the armies of the Eastern Association (Cambridgeshire, Essex, Suffolk, Norfolk, Hertfordshire, Huntingdonshire and Lincolnshire), responsible for supplies and administration.

In December 1643 the Earl, as their captain-general, appointed him "Commissioner for the destruction of monuments of idolatry and superstition". He was to carry out a Parliamentary Ordinance of 28 August 1643 which stated that "all Monuments of Superstition and Idolatry should be removed and abolished". These were specified as "fixed altars, altar rails, chancel steps, crucifixes, crosses, images and pictures of any one of the persons of the Trinity and of the Virgin Mary, and pictures of saints or superstitious inscriptions." In May 1644 the scope of the ordinance was widened to include representations of angels (a particular obsession of Dowsing's), rood lofts, holy water stoups, and images in stone, wood and glass and on plate.

Dowsing carried out his work in 1643–44 by visiting over 250 churches in Cambridgeshire and Suffolk, including several of the college chapels in the University of Cambridge, removing or defacing items that he thought fitted the requirements outlined in the ordinance. John Barwick complained of

"one who calls himself Iohn Dowsing, [who] by vertue of a pretended Commission goes about the Country like a Bedlam breaking glasse windowes, having battered and beaten downe all our painted glasse, not only in our Chapples, but (contrary to Order) in our publique Schooles, Colledge Halls, Libraryes, and Chambers, mistaking perhaps the liberall Arts for Saints... and having (against an Order) defaced and digged up the floors of our Chappels, many of which had lien so for two or three hundred yeares together, not regarding the dust of our founders and predecessors, who likely were buried there; compelled us by armed Souldiers to pay forty shillings a Colledge for not mending what he had spoyled and defaced, or forthwith to go to Prison"

He recruited assistants, apparently among his friends and family. Where they were unable to perform the work themselves, he left instructions for the work to be carried out by others. Sometimes the local inhabitants assisted his work, but often he was met by resistance or non-co-operation. His commission, backed up by the authority to call on military force if necessary, meant that he usually got his way. He charged each church a noble (one third of a pound) for his services. Dowsing's commission was at the instance and under the direction of the Earl of Manchester. It therefore ceased when his patron fell out with Oliver Cromwell in late 1644.

Dowsing is unique among the iconoclasts at work during this period because he left journals recording much of what he did. They contain many detailed entries such as this one dated Haverhill, Suffolk, 6 January 1644:

"We broke down about a hundred superstitious Pictures; and seven Fryars hugging a Nunn; and the Picture of God and Christ; and divers others very superstitious; and 200 had been broke down before I came. We took away 2 popish Inscriptions with Ora pro nobis and we beat down a great stoneing Cross on the top of the Church."

Versions of the journals are available on-line, and are collected and interpreted in the modern edition by Trevor Cooper.

A portrait of him has been identified in the collections of the Colchester and Ipswich Museums Service at Wolsey Art Gallery, Ipswich.

== Sources ==
- "Dowsing, William" . Dictionary of National Biography. London: Smith, Elder & Co. 1885–1900.

=== Published editions of the Diaries ===
- 1885: Evelyn White, C.H., Published by Pawsey and Hayes, Ipswich. With Introduction etc.1885 edition on-line from Canadian libraries
- 2001: Trevor Cooper, ed. The Journal of William Dowsing: Iconoclasm in East Anglia during the English Civil War. Woodbridge, Suffolk: Boydell Press, 2001. xxiv + 551 pp ISBN 0-85115-833-1.
