= The Chaplin Society =

The Chaplin Society is the informal name of The Most Excellent and Venerable Guild of Ely, by the Grace of Charles, King and Martyr, in honour of Henry Chaplin, 1st Viscount Chaplin. The Chaplin Society is a monarchist gentlemen's dining society, based at Peterhouse, University of Cambridge.
