= Evelyn Davidson White =

Evelyn Amanda Davidson White (February 1, 1921 – July 2, 2007) was an American author, vocal teacher, and choral director at Howard University.

White was born in Charlotte, North Carolina, to Rev. William H. Davidson, a Baptist minister, and Florence Gidney Davidson. She became a respected figure in American music education and was instrumental in mentoring many students who went on to have successful careers in music, including Roberta Flack, Donny Hathaway, Jessye Norman, Samuel Bonds, and Richard Smallwood.

== Works ==
- Evelyn Davidson White, Deems Taylor, Archibald T. Davidson, Clyde Parker, H. T. Burleigh (1970). All-Maryland High School Chorus Orchestra (LP recording) (in Latin). Arlington, VA: Mark Custom Records. OCLC 430356568.
- White, Evelyn Davidson (1981). Choral Music by Afro-American Composers. Metuchen, NJ: Scarecrow Press. ISBN 9780810814516.
