= Hugh Evelyn-White =

British classical scholar (1884–1924)

- Born: Ipswich, Suffolk, England
- Died: 9 September 1924 (aged 40)
- Occupation: Classical scholar

Academic background
- Education: The King's School, Ely; Wadham College, Oxford

Academic work
- Institutions: British Museum; University of Leeds
- Military career
- Allegiance: United Kingdom
- Branch: British Army
- Unit: 16th (Service) Battalion, Middlesex Regiment (Public Schools)
- Wars: First World War

Hugh Gerard Evelyn-White (1884 – 9 September 1924) was an English classicist, Egyptologist, Coptologist and archaeologist.

== Life ==
Hugh Gerard Evelyn-White was born in Ipswich in 1884. He was the son of the antiquarian, Charles Harold Evelyn-White, and his wife, Charlotte Reid. Educated at The King's School, Ely, in 1907 he graduated with a degree in classics from Wadham College, Oxford. At Oxford he had studied under the classical archaeologist Percy Gardner. In 1909, he took a job at the British Museum as an assistant to Aurel Stein, working with central Asian artefacts.

Later in 1909, Evelyn-White took a post as a specialist in Greco-Roman antiquities on the annual expedition of the New York Metropolitan Museum to Egypt. He worked each year on the expedition until the First World War, when he joined the British Army. Initially, he signed up as an enlisted soldier in the 16th (Service) Battalion, Middlesex Regiment (Public Schools), but was invalidated out due to ill-health. He subsequently obtained an officer's commission and saw further service in Egypt and Palestine before again being invalided out in 1917. He worked on the excavations in Egypt until 1921, and he returned to England in 1922 to work as a lecturer at the University of Leeds.

Evelyn-White made many translations of ancient Greek works, his most notable being those of Hesiod and the Homeric Hymns. He excavated at the Roman military site of Caerleon in 1909, at the Roman fort of Castell Collen in Radnorshire in 1913, and at Cawthorne Camp in 1924.

Evelyn-White died by suicide in 1924, at the age of forty. He shot himself in a taxi after the preceding suicide of a romantic interest.

My son, take thou never counsel with the wicked,
Neither put thou thy trust in him when thou wouldest bring any worthy thing to pass:
But find thee out an upright man:
Yea, even with long toil and far wandering shalt thou seek him.
Commit not thy way utterly unto any man, no, not unto thy friends,
For there be few that are of an honest heart.

— Theognis, 1.69–71, translated by Evelyn-White in 1909

== Selected publications ==
- Evelyn-White, Hugh G. (1909). "Translation". The Classical Review. 23 (5): 174. JSTOR 694439.
- Evelyn-White, Hugh G. (1910). "The Myth of the Nostoi". The Classical Review. 24 (7): 201–205. JSTOR 695254.
- Evelyn-White, Hugh G. (1911). "The Introduction to the Oxyrynchus Sayings". The Journal of Theological Studies. 13 (49): 74–76. JSTOR 23946823.
- Evelyn-White, Hugh G. (1913). "Hesiodeia: I". The Classical Quarterly. 7 (4): 217–220. JSTOR 635562.
- Evelyn-White, Hugh G., ed. (1914). Hesiod, the Homeric Hymns, and Homerica . Loeb Classical Library. London: William Heinemann. OCLC 5919541 – via Wikisource.
- Evelyn-White, Hugh G. (1915). "Hesiodeia: II". The Classical Quarterly. 9 (2): 72–76. JSTOR 635725.
- Evelyn-White, Hugh G. (1916). "Hesiodeia: III". The Classical Quarterly. 10 (2): 65–69. JSTOR 635959.
- Crum, W. E., & Evelyn-White, H. G. (1926). The monastery of Epiphanius at Thebes/Pt. 2 Coptic ostraca and papyri/ed. with translations and commentaries by WE Crum. The monastery of Epiphanius at Thebes.
- Evelyn White, H. G. (1920). The Egyptian Expedition 1916-1919: IV. The Monasteries of the Wadi Natrun. Bulletin of the Metropolitan Museum of Art, 34–39.
