= Charles Harold Evelyn-White =

English clergyman and antiquarian

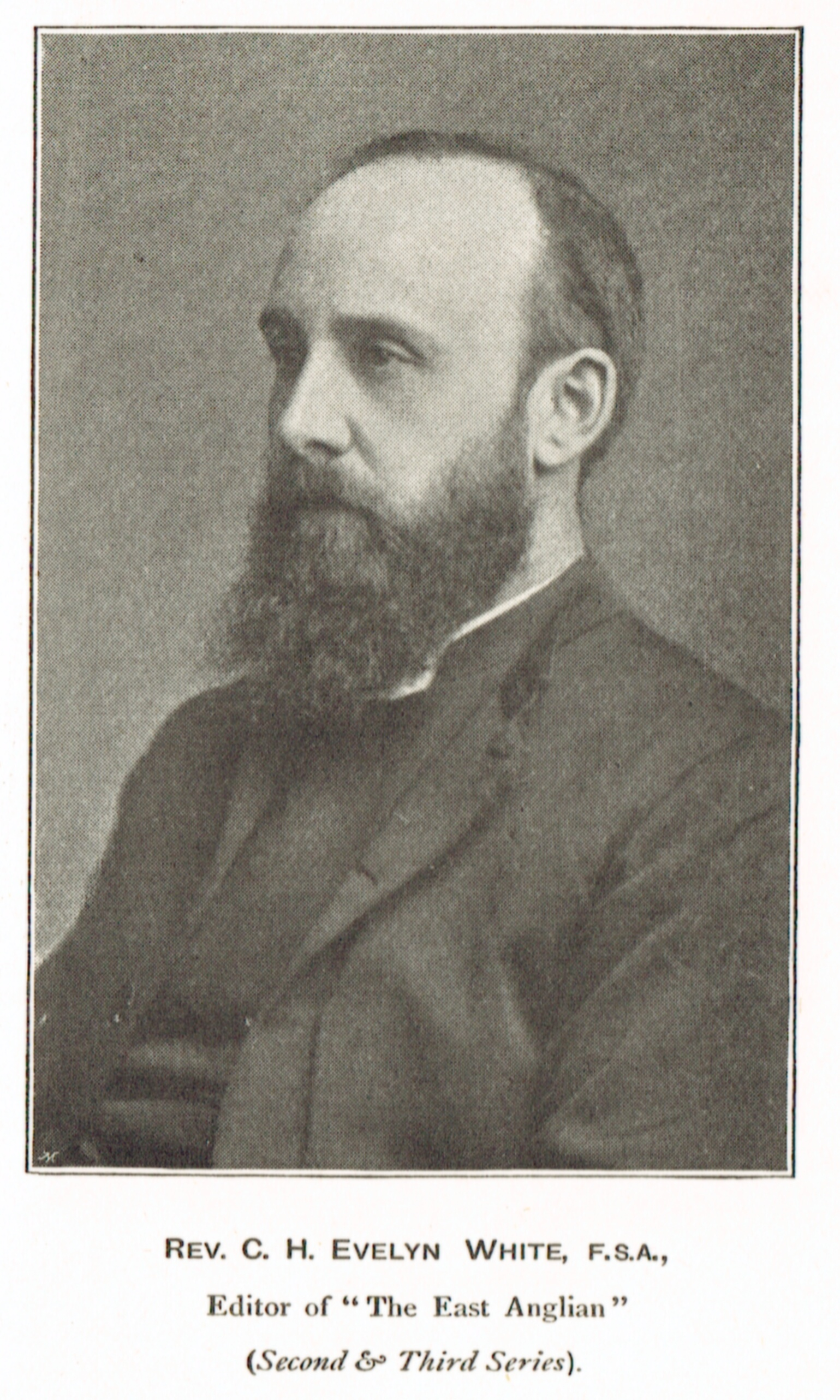

Charles Harold Evelyn-White (12 December 1850 – 7 February 1938, Felixstowe) was an English clergyman and antiquarian.

== Family life ==
Evelyn-White married Charlotte Reid, with whom he had a son, Hugh Evelyn-White, in 1884.

== Ecclesiastic career ==
In 1885 he was curate of St Margaret's Church, Ipswich. In 1894 he became rector of the Cambridgeshire village of Rampton, Cambridgeshire, a post he held until 1928.

== Antiquarian activities ==
In 1885 Evelyn-White relaunched the East Anglian, an antiquarian journal which was a revival of an earlier journal, The East Anglian Notes and Queries, founded by Samuel Tymms in 1858 under the auspices of the Suffolk Institute of Archaeology. In the same year he edited a new edition of The Journal of William Dowsing, the seventeenth century iconoclast employed by the roundheads to demolish the "superstitious pictures and ornaments of churches" under the auspices of the eastern Counties.

Evelyn-White was involved with the Cambridge Antiquarian Society until 1900, when he had a disagreement with them; he then established the Cambridgeshire & Huntingdonshire Archaeological Society largely by himself.

In 1930 he retired to Felixstowe, where he died at Wolsey Gardens in 1938.
