= Marian Restoration =

16th-century religious events in reign of English Queen Mary I

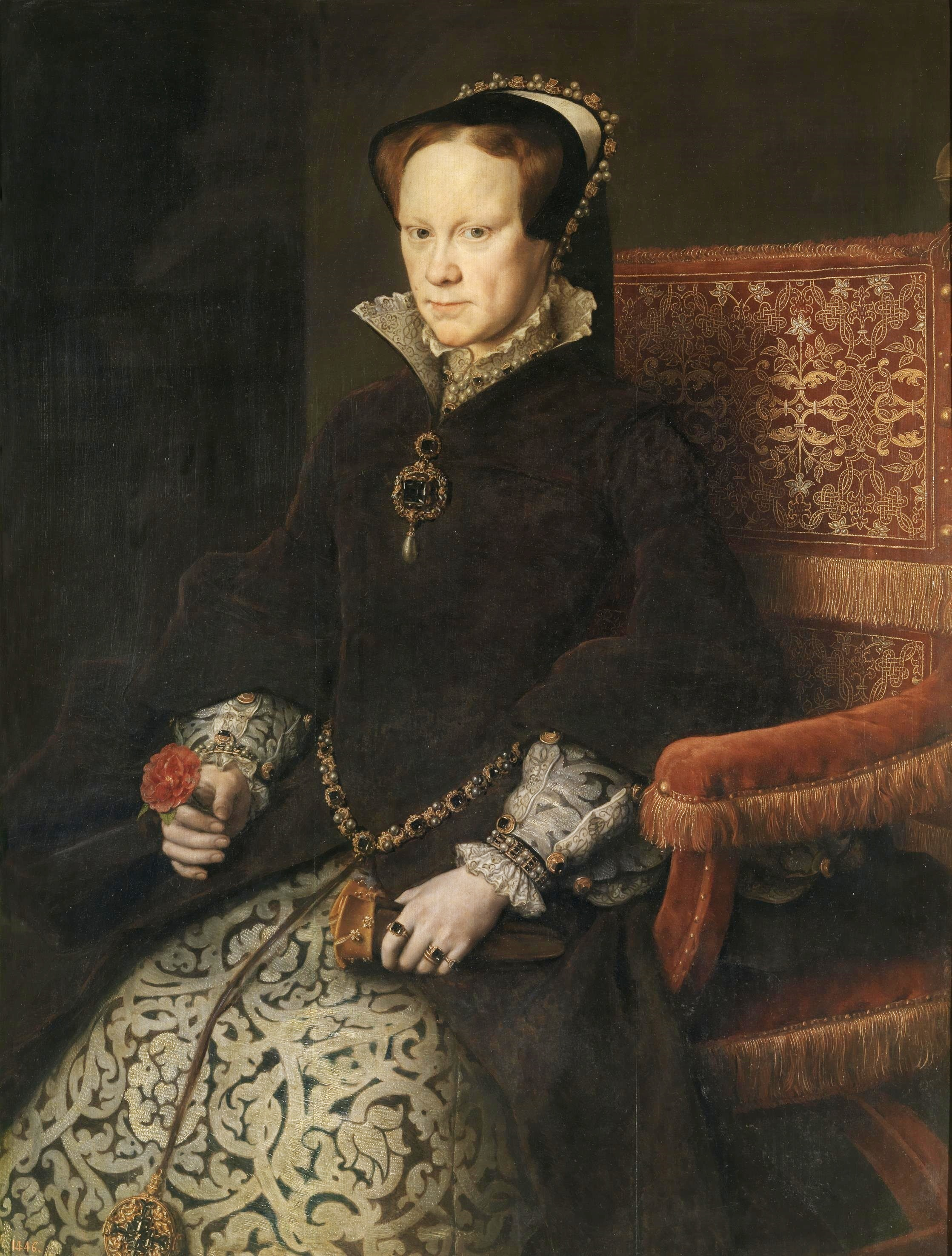
Queen Mary I of England restored the English allegiance to Rome.

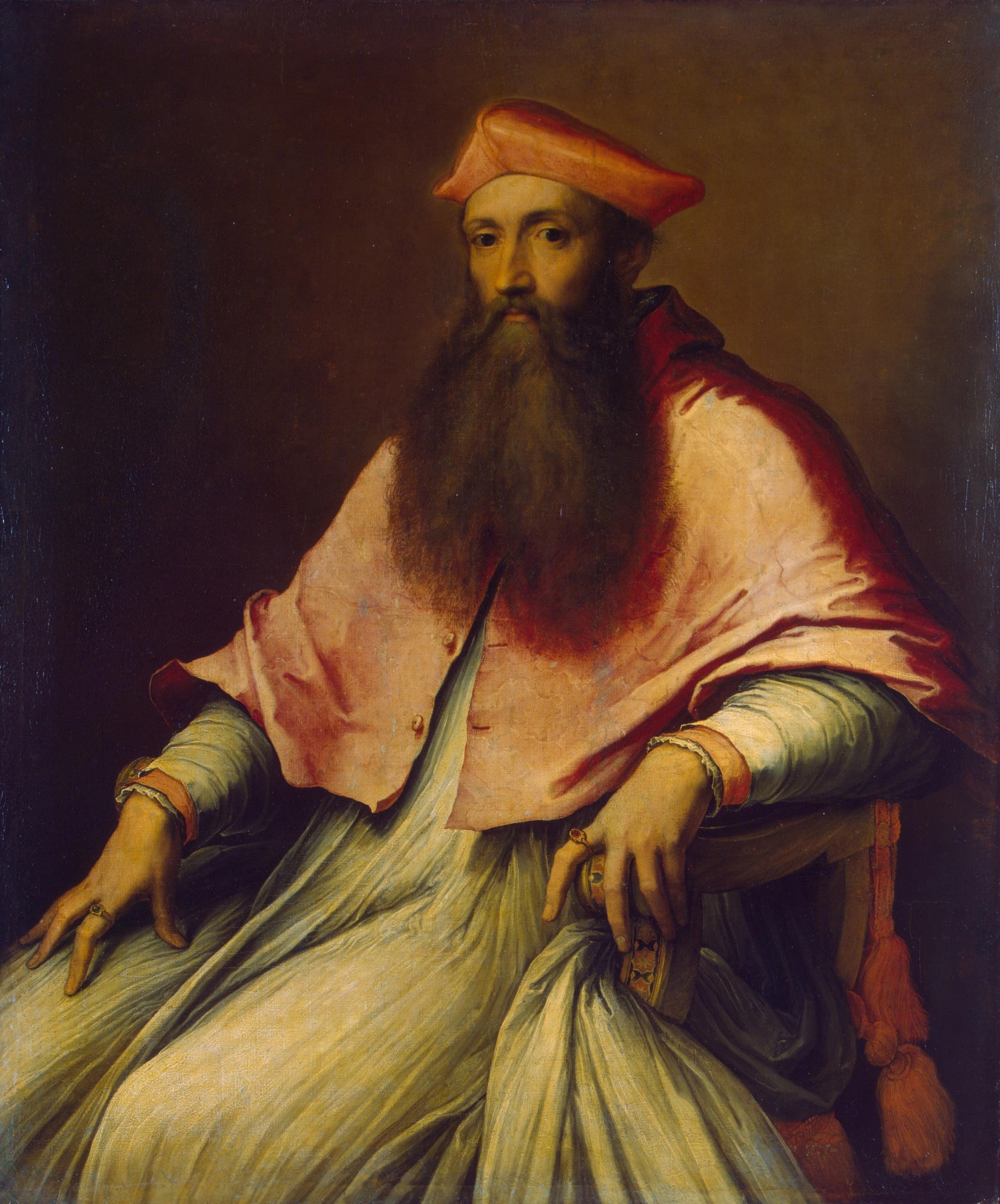
Cardinal Reginald Pole presided over the English Church's reconciliation with Rome

The Marian Restoration refers to the period 1553 to 1558 in England, i.e. the reign of Queen Mary I of England, where the changes of the Edwardian Reformation were to a large extent rolled back, moving the nation away from Protestantism and back towards Catholicism.

== Reconciling with Rome ==
Both Protestants and Catholics understood that the accession of Mary I to the throne meant a restoration of traditional religion. Before any official sanction, Latin Masses began reappearing throughout England, despite the 1552 Book of Common Prayer remaining the only legal liturgy. Mary began her reign cautiously by emphasising the need for tolerance in matters of religion and proclaiming that, for the time being, she would not compel religious conformity. This was in part Mary's attempt to avoid provoking Protestant opposition before she could consolidate her power. While Protestants were not a majority of the population, their numbers had grown through Edward's reign. Historian Eamon Duffy writes that "Protestantism was a force to be reckoned with in London and in towns like Bristol, Rye, and Colchester, and it was becoming so in some northern towns such as Hessle, Hull, and Halifax."

Following Mary's accession, the Duke of Norfolk along with the conservative bishops Bonner, Gardiner, Tunstall, Day and Heath were released from prison and restored to their former dioceses. By September 1553, Hooper and Cranmer were imprisoned. Northumberland himself was executed but not before his conversion to Catholicism.

The break with Rome and the religious reforms of Henry VIII and Edward VI were achieved through parliamentary legislation and could only be reversed through Parliament. When Parliament met in October, Bishop Gardiner, now Lord Chancellor, initially proposed the repeal of all religious legislation since 1529. The House of Commons refused to pass this bill, and after heated debate, Parliament repealed all Edwardian religious laws, including clerical marriage and the prayer book, in the First Statute of Repeal. By 20 December, the Mass was reinstated by law. There were disappointments for Mary: Parliament refused to penalise non-attendance at Mass, would not restore confiscated church property, and left open the question of papal supremacy.

If Mary was to secure England for Catholicism, she needed an heir and her Protestant half-sister Elizabeth had to be prevented from inheriting the Crown. On the advice of her cousin Charles V, Holy Roman Emperor, she married his son, Philip II of Spain, in 1554. There was opposition, and even a rebellion in Kent (led by Sir Thomas Wyatt); even though it was provided that Philip would never inherit the kingdom if there was no heir, received no estates and had no coronation.

By the end of 1554, Henry VIII's religious settlement had been repealed, but England was still not reunited with Rome. Before reunion could occur, church property disputes had to be settled—which, in practice, meant letting the nobility and gentry who had bought confiscated church lands keep them.

== Cardinal Pole ==
Cardinal Reginald Pole, the Queen's cousin, arrived in November 1554 as papal legate to end England's schism with the Catholic Church. On 28 November, Pole addressed Parliament to ask it to end the schism, declaring "I come not to destroy, but to build. I come to reconcile, not to condemn. I come not to compel, but to call again." In response, Parliament submitted a petition to the Queen the next day asking that "this realm and dominions might be again united to the Church of Rome by the means of the Lord Cardinal Pole".

On 30 November, Pole spoke to both houses of Parliament, absolving the members of Parliament "with the whole realm and dominions thereof, from all heresy and schism". Afterwards, bishops absolved diocesan clergy, and they in turn absolved parishioners. On 26 December, the Privy Council introduced legislation repealing the religious legislation of Henry VIII's reign and implementing the reunion with Rome. This bill was passed as the Second Statute of Repeal.

Cardinal Pole would eventually replace Cranmer as Archbishop of Canterbury in 1556, jurisdictional issues between England and Rome having prevented Cranmer's removal. Mary could have had Cranmer tried and executed for treason—he had supported the claims of Lady Jane Grey—but she resolved to have him tried for heresy. His recantations of his Protestantism would have been a major coup. Unhappily for her, he unexpectedly withdrew his recantations at the last minute as he was to be burned at the stake, thus ruining her government's propaganda victory.

As the papal legate, Pole possessed authority over both his Province of Canterbury and the Province of York, which allowed him to oversee the Counter-Reformation throughout all of England. He re-installed images, vestment and plate in churches. Around 2,000 married clergy were separated from their wives, but the majority of these were allowed to continue their work as priests. Pole was aided by some of the leading Catholic intellectuals, Spanish members of the Dominican Order: Pedro de Soto, Juan de Villagarcía and Bartolomé Carranza.

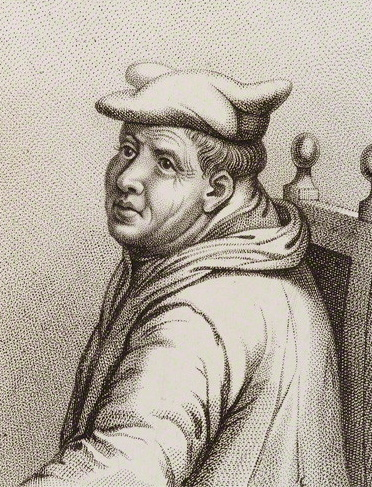
Conservative Bishop Edmund Bonner

In 1556, Pole ordered clergy to read one chapter of Bishop Bonner's A Profitable and Necessary Doctrine to their parishioners every Sunday. Modelled on the King's Book of 1543, Bonner's work was a survey of basic Catholic teaching organised around the Apostles' Creed, Ten Commandments, seven deadly sins, sacraments, the Lord's Prayer, and the Hail Mary. Bonner also produced a children's catechism and a collection of homilies.

== Catholic recovery ==
The historian Eamon Duffy writes that the Marian religious "programme was not one of reaction but of creative reconstruction" absorbing whatever was considered positive in the reforms of Henry VIII and Edward VI. The result was "subtly but distinctively different from the Catholicism of the 1520s." According to historian Christopher Haigh, the Catholicism taking shape in Mary's reign "reflected the mature Erasmian Catholicism" of its leading clerics, who were all educated in the 1520s and 1530s. Marian church literature, church benefactions and churchwarden accounts suggest less emphasis on saints, images, and prayer for the dead than had been prevalent in pre-Reformation English Catholicism. There was a greater focus on the need for inward contrition in addition to external acts of penance. Cardinal Pole himself was a member of the Spirituali, a Catholic reform movement that shared with Protestants an emphasis on man's total dependence on God's grace by faith and Augustinian views on salvation.

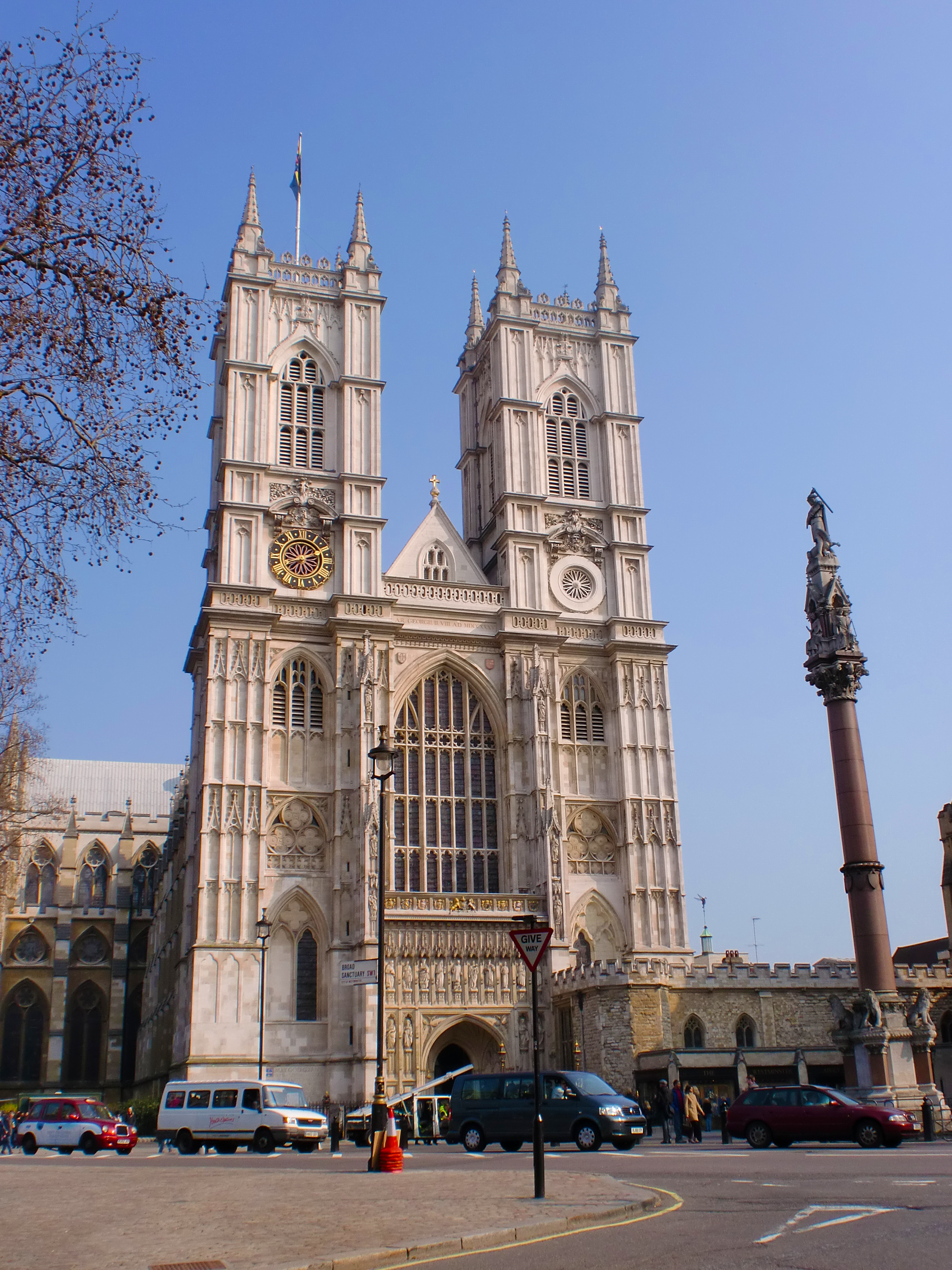
Westminster Abbey was one of seven monasteries re-founded during the Marian Restoration

From December 1555 to February 1556, Cardinal Pole presided over a national legatine synod that produced a set of decrees entitled Reformatio Angliae or the Reformation of England. The actions taken by the synod anticipated many of the reforms enacted throughout the Catholic Church after the Council of Trent. Pole believed that ignorance and lack of discipline among the clergy had led to England's religious turmoil, and the synod's reforms were designed to remedy both problems. Clerical absenteeism (the practice of clergy failing to reside in their diocese or parish), pluralism, and simony were condemned. Preaching was placed at the centre of the pastoral office, and all clergy were to provide sermons to the people (rectors and vicars who failed to were fined). The most important part of the plan was the order to establish a seminary in each diocese, which would replace the disorderly manner in which priests had been trained previously. The Council of Trent would later impose the seminary system upon the rest of the Catholic Church. It was also the first to introduce the altar tabernacle used to reserve Eucharistic bread for devotion and adoration.

Mary did what she could to restore church finances and land taken in the reigns of her father and brother. In 1555, she returned to the church the First Fruits and Tenths revenue, but with these new funds came the responsibility of paying the pensions of ex-religious. She restored six religious houses with her own money, notably Westminster Abbey for the Benedictines and Syon Abbey for the Bridgettines. However, there were limits to what could be restored. Only seven religious houses were re-founded between 1555 and 1558, though there were plans to re-establish more. Of the 1,500 ex-religious still living, only about a hundred resumed monastic life, and only a small number of chantries were re-founded. Re-establishments were hindered by the changing nature of charitable giving. A plan to re-establish Greyfriars in London was prevented because its buildings were occupied by Christ's Hospital, a school for orphaned children.

There is debate among historians over how vibrant the restoration was on the local level. According to historian A. G. Dickens, it was a time of "religious and cultural sterility", though historian Christopher Haigh observed enthusiasm, marred only by poor harvests that produced poverty and want. Recruitment to the English clergy began to rise after almost a decade of declining ordinations. Repairs to long-neglected churches began. In the parishes, "restoration and repair continued, new bells were bought, and church ales produced their bucolic profits". Great church feasts were restored and celebrated with plays, pageants and processions. However, Bishop Bonner's attempt to establish weekly processions in 1556 was a failure. Haigh writes that in years during which processions were banned people had discovered "better uses for their time" as well as "better uses for their money than offering candles to images". The focus was on "the crucified Christ, in the mass, the rood, and Corpus Christi devotion".

== Obstacles ==
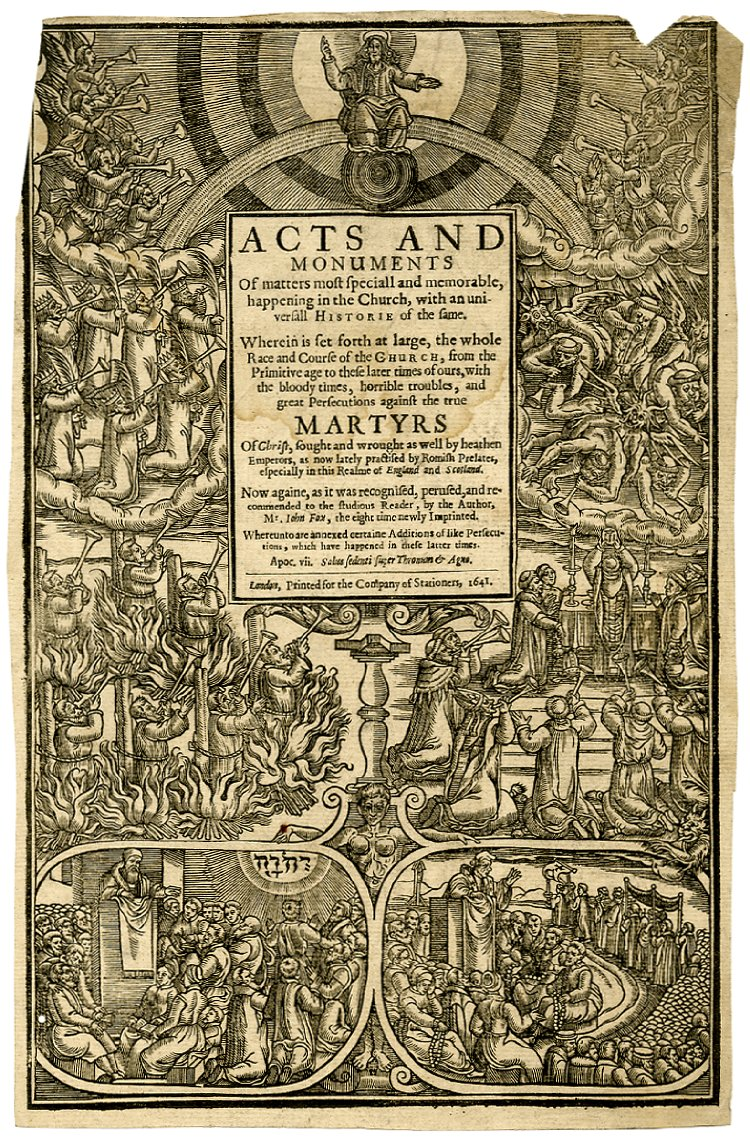
Frontispiece of John Foxe's Book of Martyrs

Protestants who refused to conform remained an obstacle to Catholic plans. Around 800 Protestants fled England to find safety in Protestant areas of Germany and Switzerland, establishing networks of independent congregations. Safe from persecution, these Marian exiles carried on a propaganda campaign against Catholicism and the Queen's Spanish marriage, sometimes calling for rebellion. Those who remained in England were forced to practise their faith in secret and meet in underground congregations.

In 1555, the initial reconciling tone of the regime began to harden with the revival of the English late medieval civil heresy laws, which authorised capital punishment as a penalty for heresy. The persecution of heretics was uncoordinated—sometimes arrests were ordered by the Privy Council, others by bishops, and others by lay magistrates. Protestants brought attention to themselves usually due to some act of dissent, such as denouncing the Mass or refusing to receive the sacrament. A particularly violent act of protest was William Flower's stabbing of a priest during Mass on Easter Sunday, 14 April 1555. Individuals accused of heresy were examined by a church official and, if heresy was found, given the choice between death and signing a recantation. In some cases, Protestants were burnt at the stake after renouncing their recantation.

Around 284 Protestants were burnt at the stake for heresy. Several leading reformers were executed, including Thomas Cranmer, Hugh Latimer, Nicholas Ridley, John Rogers, John Hooper, Robert Ferrar, Rowland Taylor, and John Bradford. Lesser known figures were also among the victims, including around 51 women such as Joan Waste and Agnes Prest. Historian O. T. Hargrave writes that the Marian persecution was not "excessive" by "contemporary continental standards"; however, "it was unprecedented in the English experience". Historian Christopher Haigh writes that it "failed to intimidate all Protestants", whose bravery at the stake inspired others; however, it "was not a disaster: if it did not help the Catholic cause, it did not do much to harm it." After her death, the Queen became known as "Bloody Mary" due to the influence of John Foxe, one of the Marian exiles. Published in 1563, Foxe's Book of Martyrs provided accounts of the executions, and in 1571 the Convocation of Canterbury ordered that Foxe's book should be placed in every cathedral in the land.

Mary's efforts at restoring Catholicism were also frustrated by the church itself. Pope Paul IV declared war on Philip and recalled Pole to Rome to have him tried as a heretic. Mary refused to let him go. The support she might have expected from a grateful Pope was thus denied. From 1557, the Pope refused to confirm English bishops, leading to vacancies and hurting the Marian religious program.

Despite these obstacles, the 5-year restoration was successful. There was support for traditional religion among the people, and Protestants remained a minority. Consequently, Protestants secretly ministering to underground congregations, such as Thomas Bentham, were planning for a long haul, a ministry of survival. Mary's death in November 1558, childless and without having made provision for a Catholic to succeed her, meant that her Protestant sister Elizabeth would be the next queen.

Although deeply concerned about her restoration of Catholicism, Mary ultimately recognized Elizabeth as her heir on 6 November 1558 on her deathbed. This decision was reportedly influenced by Elizabeth's vow of Catholic faith—including her belief in the Real Presence—which she affirmed under oath during Mary's final illness. Elizabeth became queen when Mary died on 17 November.
