= Alexander Nairne =

Alexander Nairne (1862–1936) was a Canon of Windsor from 1921 to 1936 and Regius Professor of Divinity at Cambridge.

== Career ==
He was educated at Jesus College, Cambridge, and graduated DD in 1914.

He was appointed:

- Assistant curate of Great St Mary's, Cambridge 1887 - 1889
- Assistant Master at Harrow School 1890 - 1892
- Assistant curate at Hadleigh, Suffolk 1892 - 1894
- Rector of Tewin 1894 - 1912
- Professor Hebrew and Old Testament Exegesis, King’s College, London 1900 - 1917
- Vicar of All Saints Church, Cambridge 1917 - 1919
- Dean of Jesus College, Cambridge 1917
- Canon of Chester Cathedral 1914 - 1922
- Regius Professor of Divinity at Cambridge 1922 - 1932

He was appointed to the eleventh stall in St George's Chapel, Windsor Castle, in 1921, and held the stall until 1936.

Academic offices
Preceded by Vincent Henry Stanton	Regius Professor of Divinity at the University of Cambridge; 1922–1932	Succeeded by Charles E. Raven
