= Fort Richmond (Maine) =

Massachusetts colonial fort near present-day Richmond Village, Maine

Coordinates: 44°05′30″N 69°47′07″W

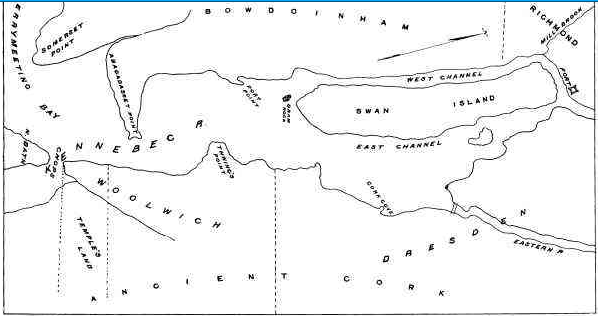
Fort Richmond, Maine

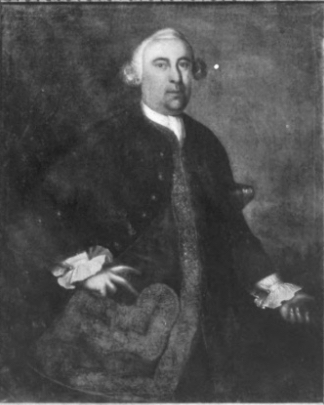
Commander William Lithgow (judge)

Fort Richmond was a Massachusetts colonial fort in present-day Richmond, Maine.

== History ==
The Pejepscot Proprietors and the Massachusetts Bay Colony built the fort in around 1720 on the western bank of the Kennebec River in response to Indian raids which eventually led to Dummer's War. Named for Ludovic Stewart, 1st Duke of Richmond, the fort included a blockhouse, trading post, chapel, officers' and soldiers' quarters, all surrounded by a palisade.

Captain Joseph Heath (military officer), Edward Shove, John Oulton, Captain Jabez Bradbury, Captain John Minot and Captain Joseph Bane (Bean) were the commanders of the fort. William Lithgow (judge) and Arthur Noble were also commanders of the fort by 1746. (Lithgow married Noble's daughter.)

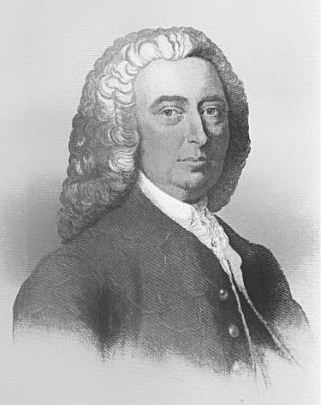
Arthur Noble, Georgetown, Maine

During Father Rale's War, following the battle at Fort Menaskoux, Arrowsic, Maine, Fort Richmond was attacked in a 3-hour siege by warriors from Norridgewock (1722). Houses were burned and cattle slain, but the fort held. Brunswick and other settlements near the mouth of the Kennebec were destroyed. The defense was enlarged in 1723 during Father Rale's War. On August 19, 1724, a militia of 208 soldiers departed Fort Richmond under command of captains Jeremiah Moulton and Johnson Harmon, traveled up the Kennebec in 17 whaleboats, and sacked Norridgewock, killing Sébastien Rale.

Fort Richmond would be rebuilt in 1740.

William Lithgow (judge) was put in command from 1746 to 1754. In 1748, natives took Frances Noble captive close to Fort Richmond. Frances Noble wrote her captivity narrative.

The fort was attacked by another tribe at Swan Island in 1750.

The fort was dismantled in 1755 when forts Shirley (also called Fort Frankfort located close to Richmond at present-day Dresden, Maine), Western and Halifax were built upriver.

== Commanding Officers ==
- Captain Joseph Heath (military officer)
- Edward Shove
- John Oulton (military officer)
- Captain Jabez Bradbury, who later commanded Fort George (Brunswick, Maine)
- Captain John Minot
- Captain Joseph Bane (Bean) were the commanders of the fort.
- William Lithgow (judge)
- Arthur Noble, 1746. (Lithgow married Noble's daughter.)

== See also ==
- Fort George (Brunswick, Maine)
- Fort St. George (Thomaston, Maine)
- Fort Menaskoux
