= Henry Barclay Swete =

English Biblical scholar

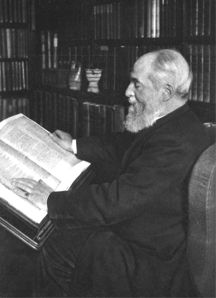
Henry Barclay Swete

Henry Barclay Swete FBA (14 March 1835 in Bristol – 10 May 1917 in Hitchin) was an English biblical scholar. He became Regius Professor of Divinity at Cambridge in 1890. He is known for his 1906 commentary on the Book of Revelation, and other works of exegesis.

== Biography ==
Swete was educated at King's College London, and Gonville and Caius College, Cambridge, and in 1858 was ordained. From 1858 to 1865 he was assistant curate to his father John Swete at St Andrew's Blagdon in Somerset. Then after some years of work in various country curacies and livings he became in 1869 theological lecturer and tutor at Caius College.

In 1881 he became examining chaplain to the Bishop of St. Albans, and the following year was appointed professor of pastoral theology at King's College London. In 1890 he succeeded Brooke Foss Westcott as regius professor at Cambridge, and retained this position until 1915, when he retired with the title of emeritus professor. In June 1901, he received an honorary doctorate of Divinity from the University of Glasgow. The following year he was appointed to the office of Lady Margaret's preacher. He was in 1911 appointed an honorary chaplain to King George V.

Swete's works on biblical texts are of high importance. In 1887 he published the first volume of his edition of the Greek text of the Old Testament, completing the series in 1894 (3rd ed. 1901–7), while in 1898 appeared the Greek text of the Gospel of St. Mark, with notes and introduction (2nd ed. 1902) and in 1906 that of the Apocalypse of St. John (2nd ed. 1907).

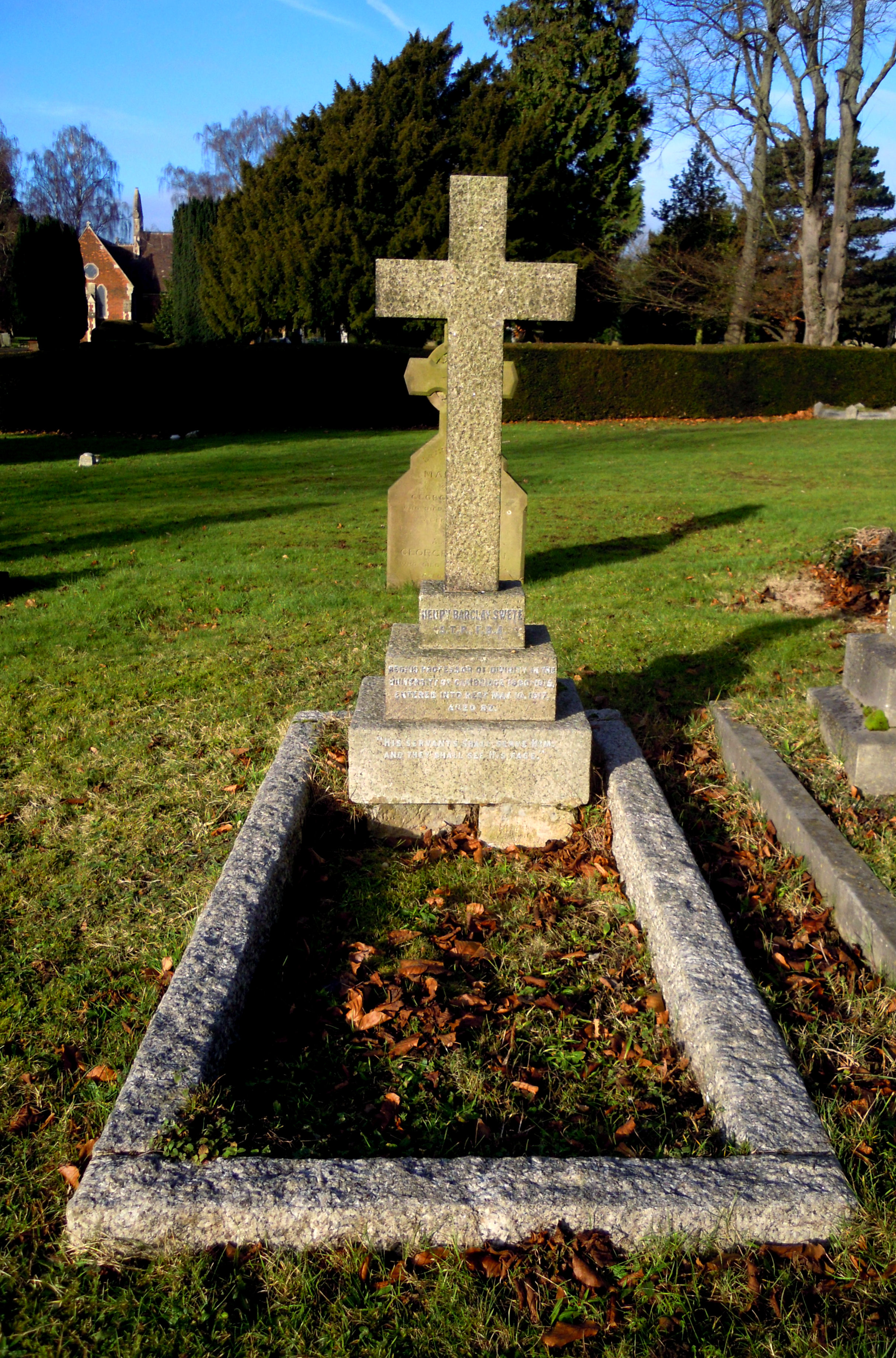
Swete's grave in Hitchin Cemetery

He was the editor of Cambridge Theological Essays (1905) and Cambridge Biblical Essays (1909), and was a contributor to Smith and Wace's Dictionary of Christian Biography (1882–87) and Hastings's Dictionary of the Bible (1899–1900). He also produced many historical and critical works, including The Apostles' Creed in Relation to Primitive Christianity (1894; 3rd ed. 1899); Church Services and Service Books before the Reformation (1896); Patristic Study (1902); The Appearances of Our Lord after the Passion (1907; 2nd ed. 1908), and The Last Discourse and Prayer of Our Lord (1913).

He is buried in Hitchin Cemetery in Hertfordshire.

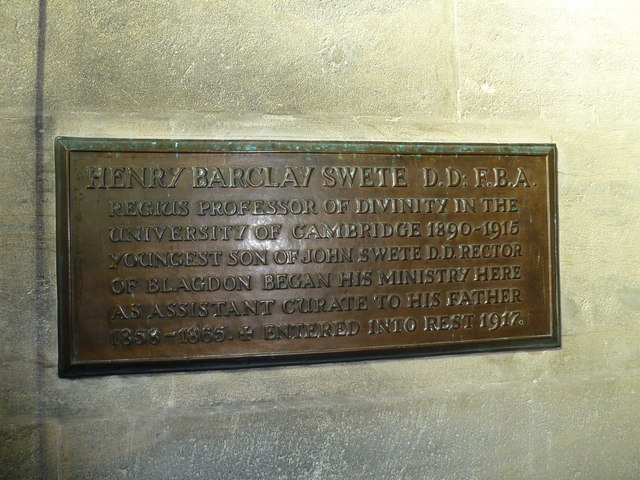
memorial plaque at St Andrew's Blagdon

== Selected works ==
- Swete, Henry Barclay (1873). On the Early History of the Doctrine of the Holy Spirit: With Especial Reference to the Controversies of the Fourth Century. Cambridge: Deighton, Bell & Co.
- ——— (1902). An Introduction to the Old Testament in Greek. Cambridge: Macmillan and Co.
- ——— (1906). The Apocalypse of St John. London: Macmillan and Co.
- ——— (1912). The Holy Spirit in the Ancient Church: A Study of Christian Teaching in the Age of the Fathers. London: Macmillan and Co. ISBN 9780790523835.
- ——— (1913). The Gospel According to St Mark. London: Macmillan and Co.
- ——— (1921). The Holy Spirit in the Ancient Church: A Study of Christian Teaching in the Age of the Fathers. London: Macmillan and Co.

Academic offices
Preceded by Brooke Foss Westcott	Regius Professor of Divinity at Cambridge; 1890–1916	Succeeded by Vincent Henry Stanton
