= Manuel García Lithgow =

Dominican Republic military officer (born 1966)

Deputy Commander-General of the Dominican Air Force
- In office 16 August 2024 – 16 August 2026
- Commander-General: Floreal T. Suárez Martínez
- Preceded by: Mauricio Ludovino Fernández García
- Succeeded by: Manuel José Brito Estepan

Director-General of the Specialized Unit for Airport Security and Civil Aviation (CESAC)
- Incumbent
- Assumed office 16 August 2026
- Preceded by: Enmanuel Souffront Tamayo

Personal details
- Born: June 19, 1966 Santo Domingo, Dominican Republic
- Spouse: Mileyka Brugal Imbert

Manuel Abad García Lithgow (Santo Domingo, 1966) is a Dominican Air Force pilot, current Director-General of the Specialized Unit for Airport Security and Civil Aviation (CESAC).

== Early life and family ==
García Lithgow was born in Santo Domingo on 19 June 1966. His parents are Melba Raquel Lithgow and Abad Manuel García, and he is the youngest of four siblings. He is descended from both William Lithgow, Irish-American judge, and his father-in-law Arthur Noble; the former was the grandfather of American merchant and diplomat Arthur Lithgow (1789–1867), who migrated to Puerto Plata in the 1820s and represented U.S. interests there from 1842 until 1867, and became the ancestor of the Lithgows of the Dominican Republic.

He is married to businesswoman Mileyka Brugal Imbert, descended from Spanish and French immigrants, she is the first woman to preside over the Puerto Plata Chamber of Commerce and Production and is the current president of the Puerto Plata Free Trade Zone Corporation.

== Education ==
García Lithgow studied at the Air Command and Staff College of Air University (Maxwell Air Force Base, U.S.) and specialized in strategic-level counterterrorism at the National Defense University in Washington, D.C.

García Lithgow has completed about 40 courses in the Dominican Republic and abroad, including information management in disaster operations, counterinsurgency and antiterrorism.

== Military career ==
García Lithgow joined the Dominican Air Force (FARD) on 8 January 1987 as a cadet candidate. Since then he has served as a military pilot and staff officer, with more than 1,200 flight hours. His posts include director of the Aviation School, commander of the Combat Squadron, commander of the Air Maintenance Command, Dominican air attaché in Brazil, commander of the Puerto Plata Air Base, and Deputy Commander-General of the FARD.

Internationally, he attended the VIII Conference of Defense Ministers of the Americas (Banff, Canada), chaired the LXVI PREPLAN of SICOFAA in Santiago, Chile, and served as secretary of CONJEFAMER 2026 in Punta Cana, where he received the rank of Grand Cross.

=== Director-General of CESAC ===
On 17 August 2026, he was appointed director-general of the Specialized Unit for Airport Security and Civil Aviation (CESAC), replacing General Enmanuel M. Souffront, while serving as deputy commander general of the FARD. At the head of the agency, García Lithgow appointed the first woman to serve as security director of an international airport in the institution's history and led the operational incorporation of 181 new agents.

== Awards ==
Awards and honours:

- Gran Cordón Policial Juan Pablo Duarte (1992 and 1997)
- M-16 Marksman Medal (1995)
- Order of Aerial Merit with White Distinction (1999)
- "Señor Piloto" recognition (2005)
- Santos-Dumont Merit Medal, from the Brazilian Air Force (2013)
- Pacifier Medal, from the Brazilian Army

== Ancestry ==
Family tree of General Manuel A. García Lithgow

8. Heriberto García Tejera (1853-1916); b. Azua, Dominican Republic
4. Pío Heriberto García Batista (1894–?); b. Azua, Dominican Republic
9. Manuela Batista; Azua, Dominican Republic
2. Abad Manuel García Bidó (1931–2006); Azua, Dominican Republic
10. Manuel de Jesús Bidó Naut (1870–?); Azua, Dominican Republic
5. Digna Luz Bidó de Lara (1897–1994); San José de Ocoa, Dominican Republic
11. Rosa de Lara Cordero (1877–1967); Azua, Dominican Republic
1. Manuel Abad García Lithgow (born 1966); Santo Domingo, Dominican Republic
12. Juan Felipe Lithgow Adams (1883–1939); Santiago, Dominican Republic
6. Carlos Manuel Lithgow Ureña (1909–1983); San Francisco de Macorís, Dominican Republic
13. Gregoria Ureña; San Francisco de Macorís, Dominican Republic
3. Melba Raquel Lithgow Ortega (born 1937); San Francisco de Macorís, Dominican Republic
14. Francisco Armando Ortega Pichardo (1865–1945); Santiago, Dominican Republic
7. Ana Lucila Ortega de Jesús (1911–2005); San Francisco de Macorís, Dominican Republic
15. Emilia de Jesús Guzmán Fondeur (1871–1951); San Francisco de Macorís, Dominican Republic
