= Hitchin Cemetery =

Chapel and burial ground in Hertfordshire, England

Coordinates: 51.944°N 0.273°W

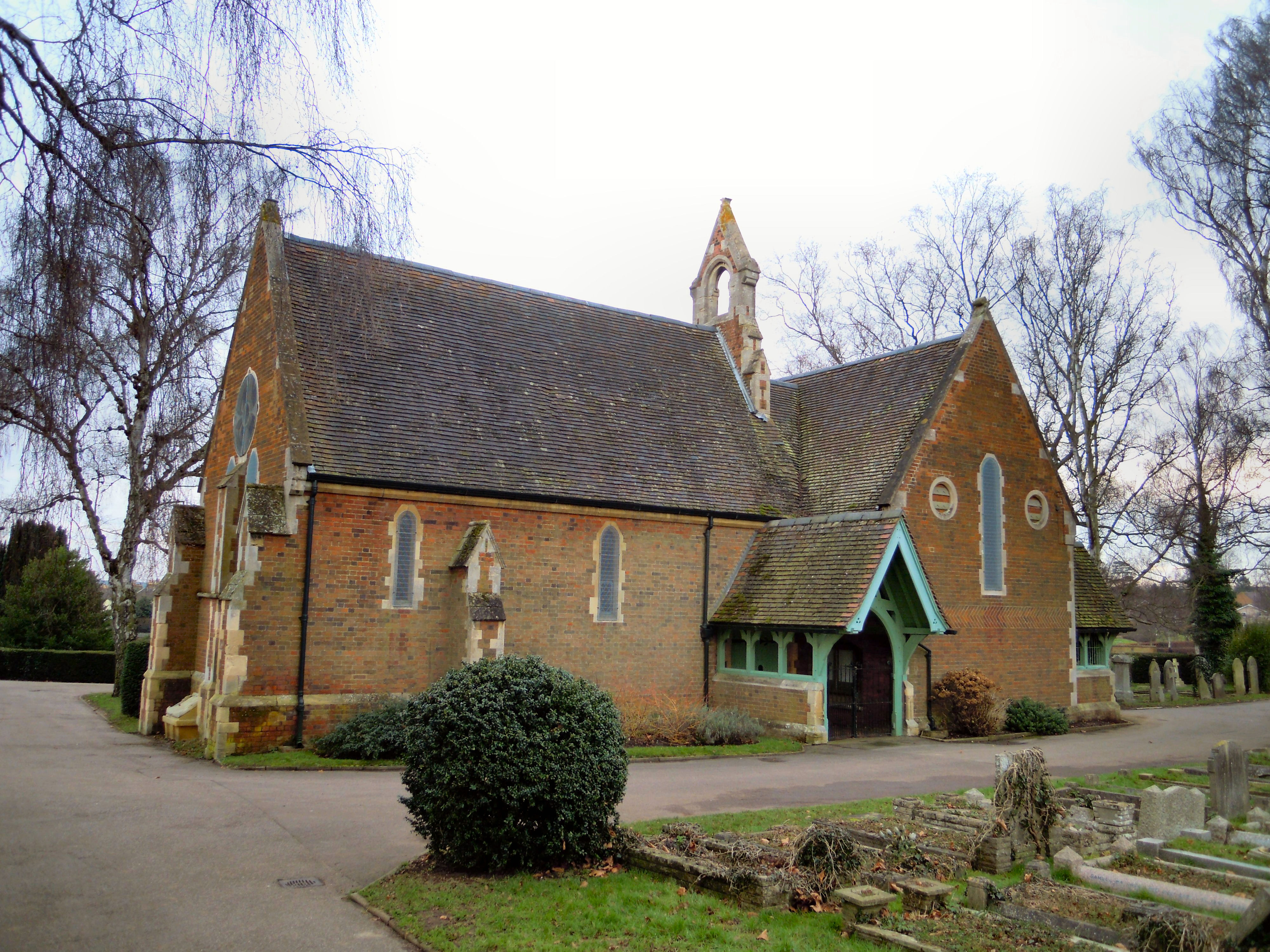
The Chapel at Hitchin Cemetery

Hitchin Cemetery, also known as St John's Road Cemetery, is the main burial ground for the town of Hitchin in Hertfordshire. The cemetery is located on Hitchin Hill, with Standhill Road running along the north-western boundary and St. John's Road along the south-eastern boundary. It has been owned and managed by North Hertfordshire District Council since 1974 and has a Chapel which can accommodate about 50 mourners which is available for the burial of all faiths.

== History ==
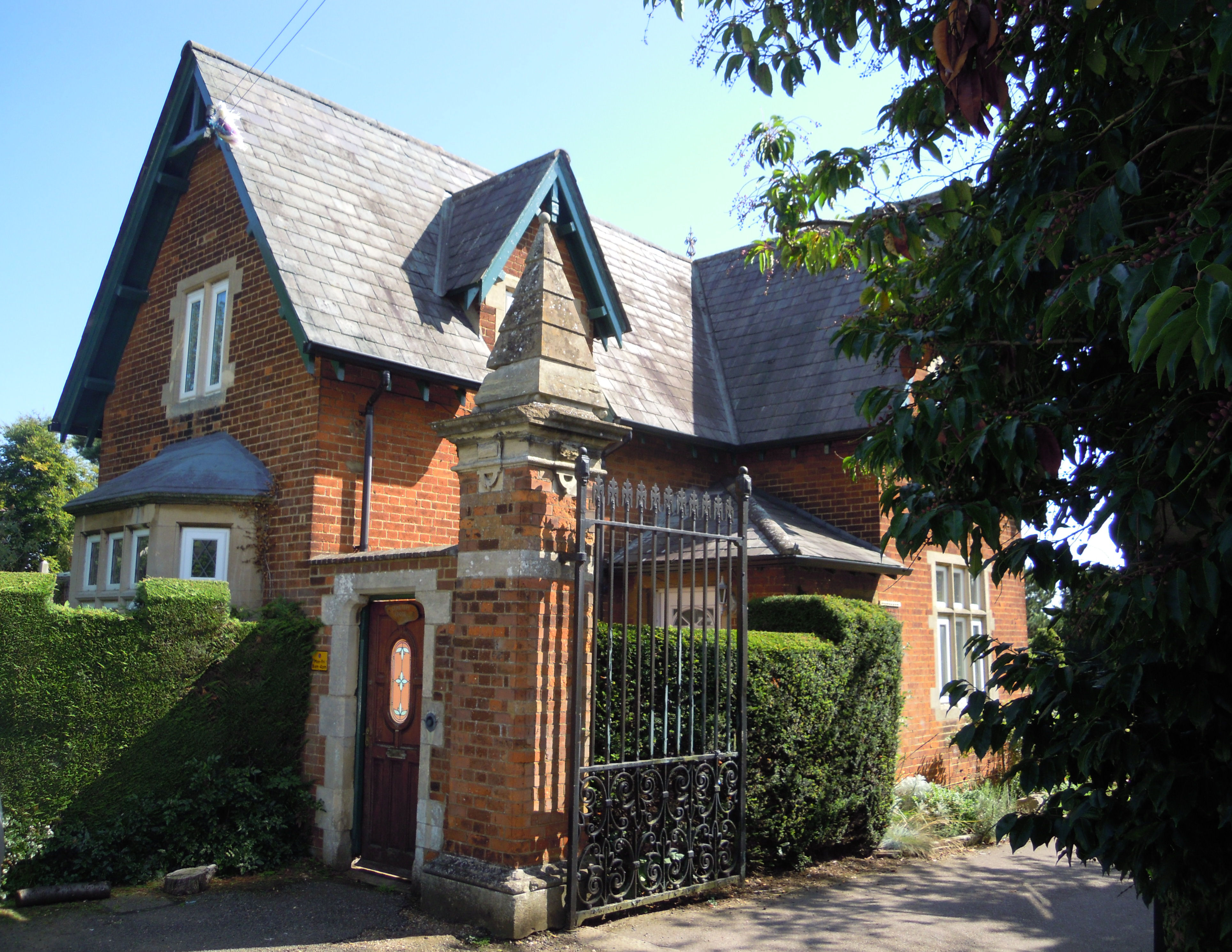
The Cemetery Lodge Cottage

As a result of two cholera epidemics in England during the 19th century a large number of public cemeteries were created across the country during the 1850s and 1860s. Hitchin Local Board of Health appointed a burial board to create the cemetery using funds from the borough rate under the Burial Act 1853; the main body of the cemetery was laid out by George Beaver and opened in 1857, with the Lodge Cottage and chapel being built in the same year. It was passed to Hitchin Urban District Council in 1894 and to North Hertfordshire District Council in 1974.

The chapel originally contained both Anglican and Non-Conformist chapels, positioned at right angles to each other. The burial ground extension to the south-west of Cemetery Road opened in 1879. The total cost for the cemetery was a little over £3,000. Cemetery Road, which today bisects the two sections of the cemetery, was built in 1871 at a cost of £986.

The opening ceremony took place on 3 May 1857, with the Anglican area being consecrated by George Murray, the Bishop of Rochester (Hitchin then being under the Diocese of Rochester), while the first burial with a tombstone was that of William Morgan in 1857. The Delmé-Radcliffe Family, who owned Hitchin Priory from 1548 to 1965, have a burial plot near the Lodge Cottage.

The cemetery covers approximately 5.64 hectares in total, divided into three separate sections based on the age of the burials. To the southwest is the newest part of the cemetery which is separated from the older parts by Cemetery Road. The oldest part of the cemetery is by the chapel in the north-eastern third of the site (approximately 1.46ha). There are a large proportion of unmarked graves in the main body of the cemetery which are believed to be pauper, children and workhouse inmate graves.

The cemetery holds 59 war graves registered and maintained by the Commonwealth War Graves Commission, 31 Commonwealth service personnel from World War I and 26 Commonwealth service personnel and two German Air Force personnel from World War II.

In 1962, an extension to the cemetery was found on land next to the cemetery, which was owned by John Howard. John later sold it to Hitchin Rural District Council (which later became North Herts District Council in 1974)

== Notable burials ==
- Edward Chapman (1804–1880), publisher who with William Hall founded the publishers Chapman & Hall.
- Mary Angela Dickens (1862–1948), novelist and oldest grandchild of Charles Dickens.
- Alfred Marshall (RAF officer) (1915–1944), flying ace with the Royal Air Force
- Henry Barclay Swete (1835–1917), Biblical scholar and Regius Professor of Divinity at Cambridge from 1890 to 1915.

== Gallery ==
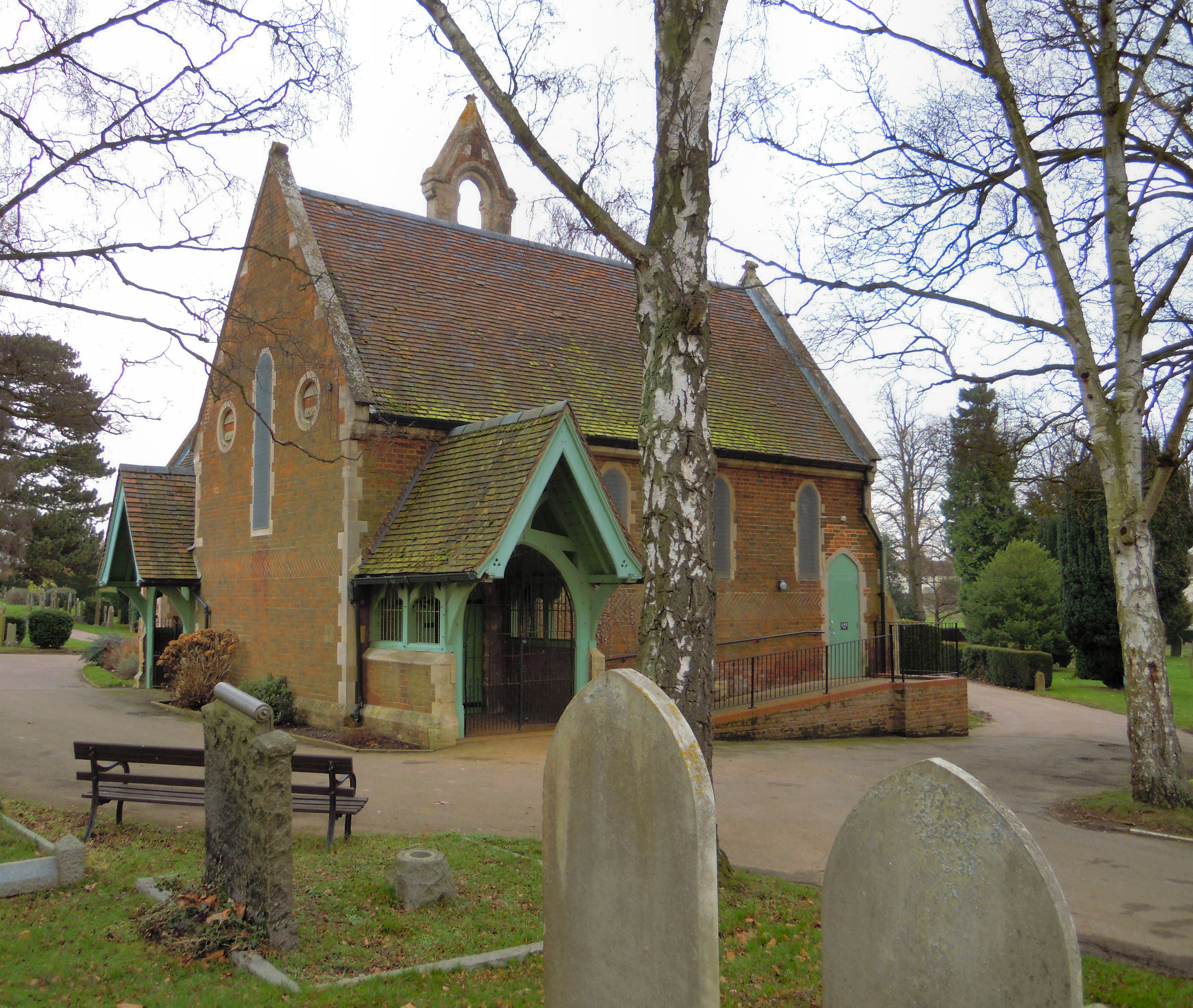
The Chapel at Hitchin Cemetery

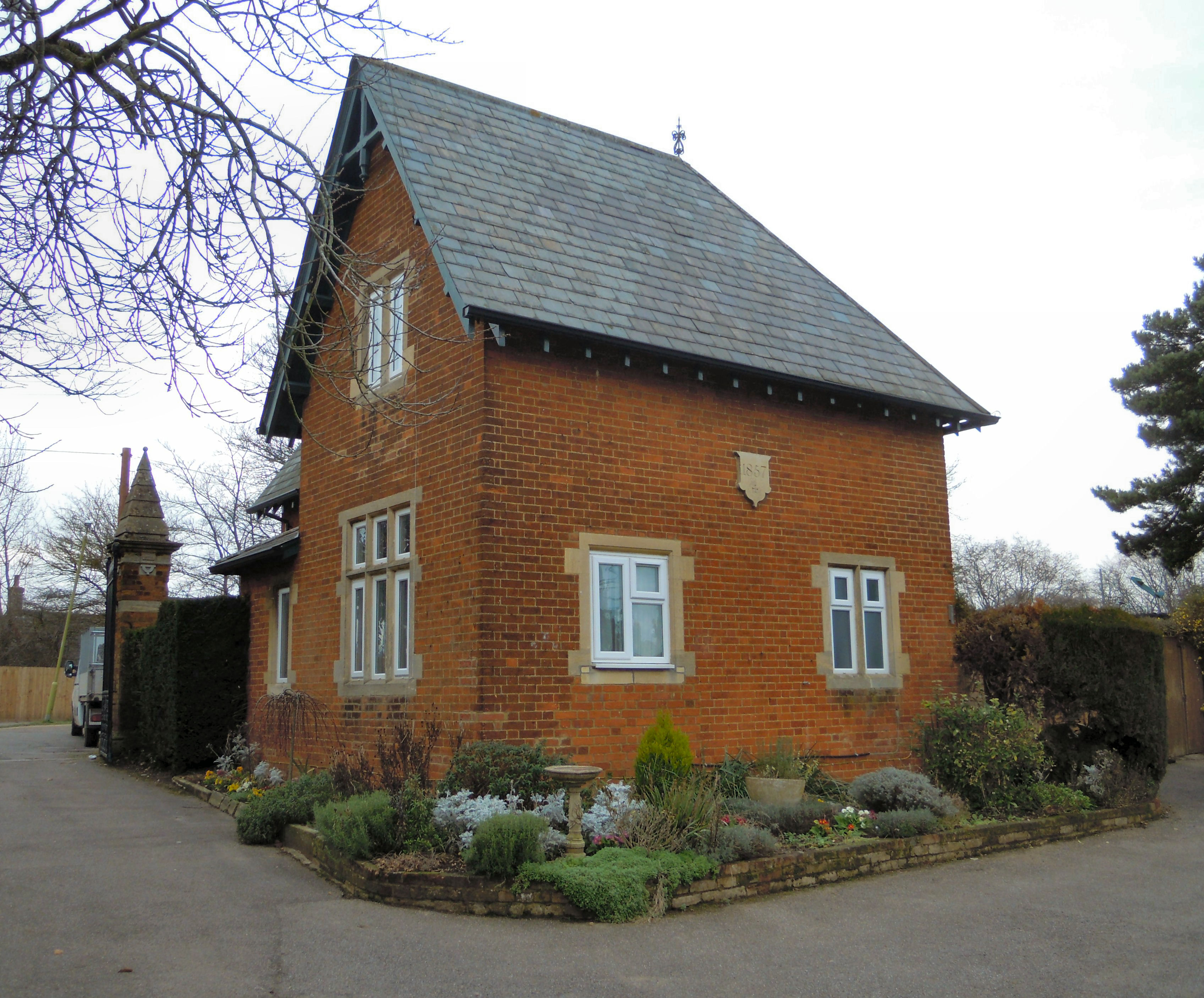
The Cemetery Lodge Cottage

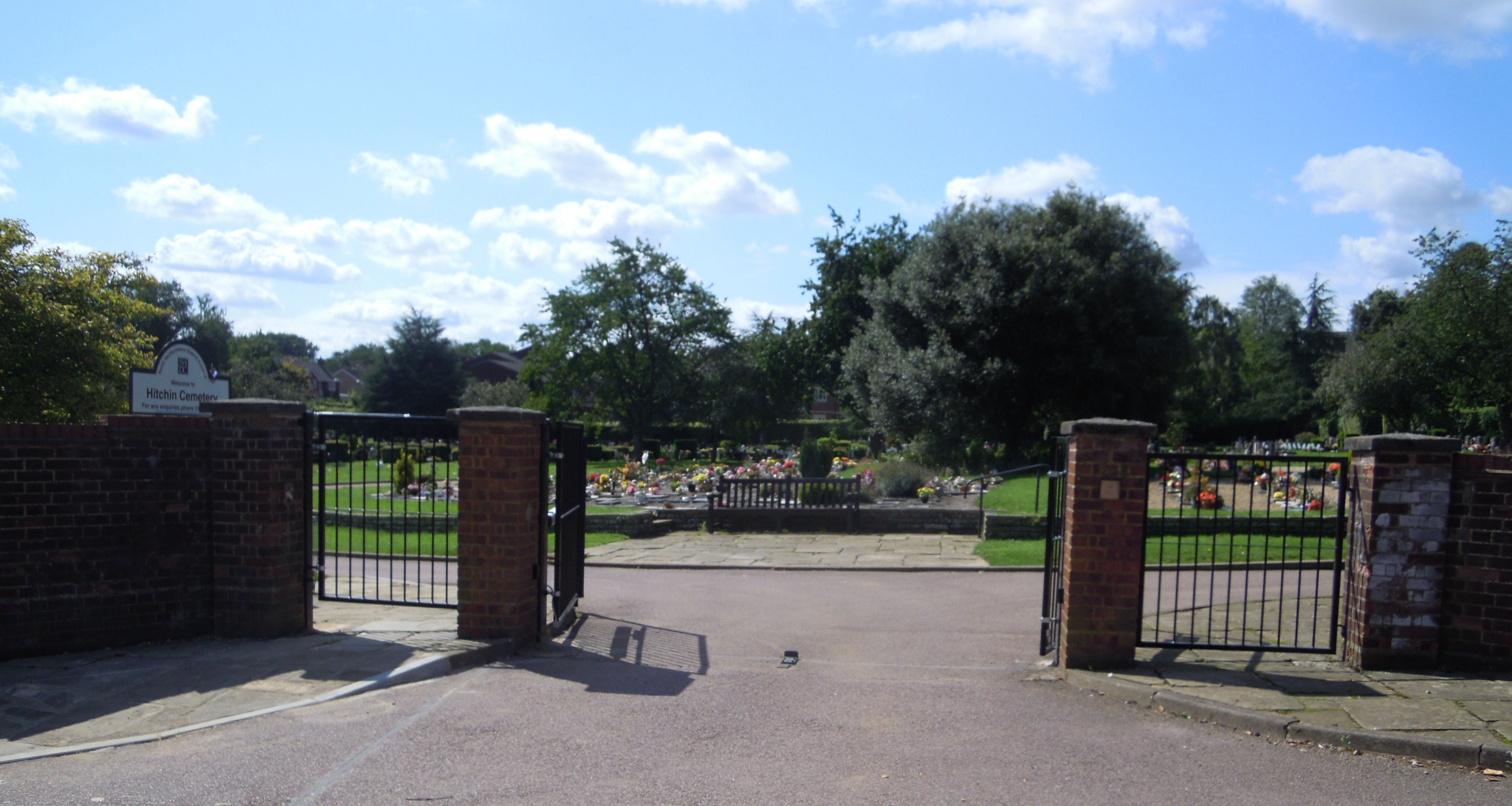
The entrance to the new section

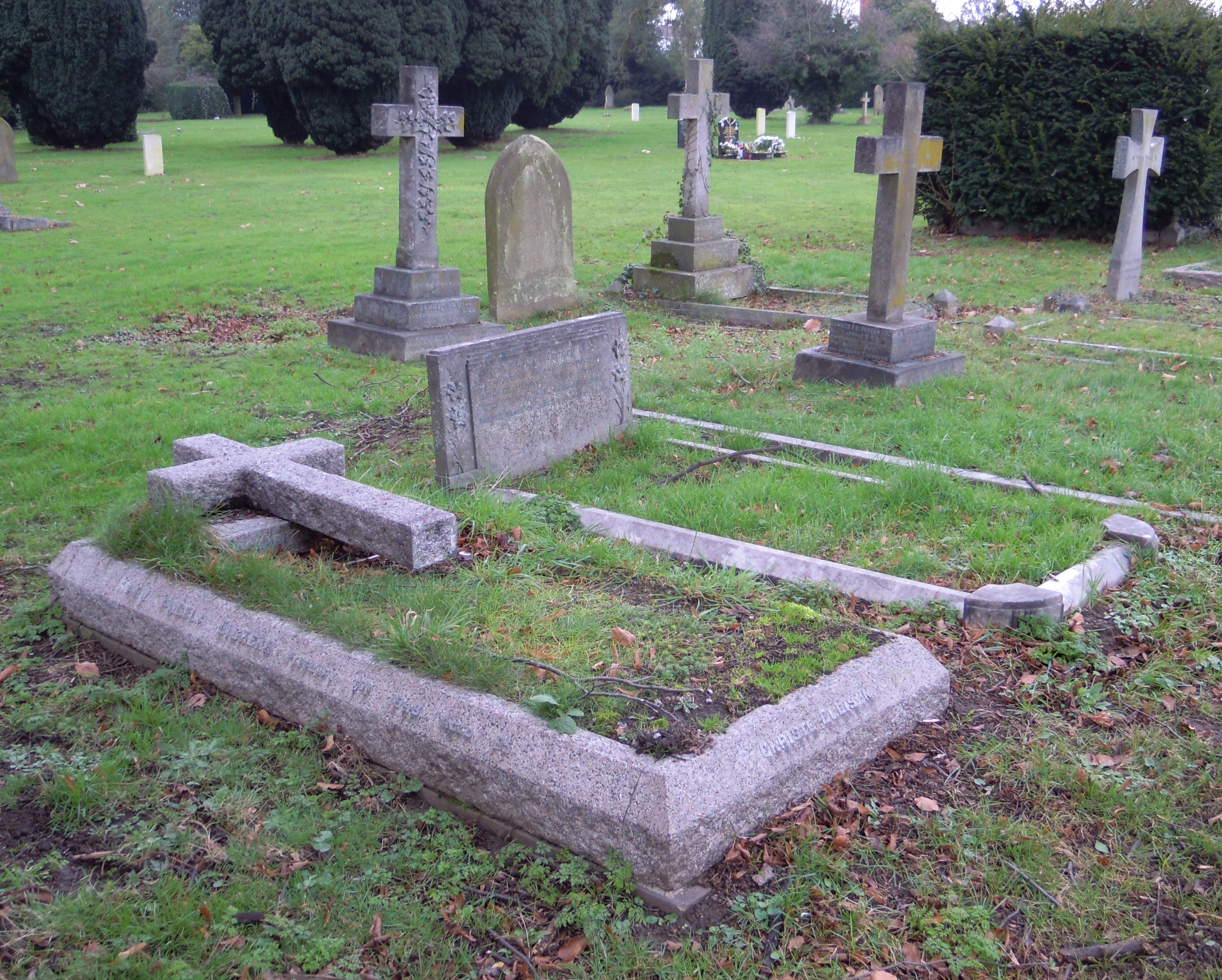
Grave of Mary Angela Dickens (foreground)
