= John Young (Regius Professor) =

English Catholic clergyman and academic (1514–1580)

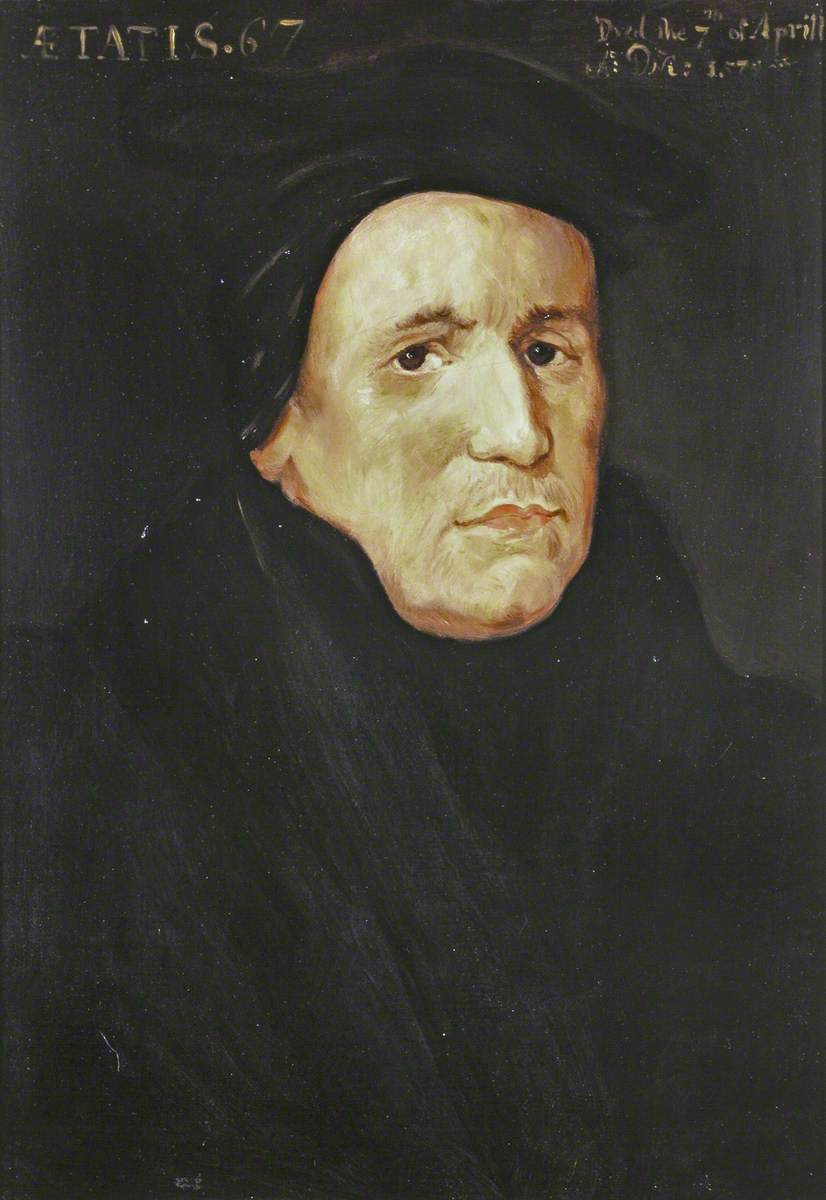
John Young

John Young (1514–1580) was an English Catholic clergyman and academic. He was Master of Pembroke Hall, Cambridge, and was later imprisoned by Elizabeth I.

== Life ==
He is said to have been a native of Yorkshire. He was educated at Cambridge, where he graduated B.A. in 1536, M.A. in 1539, and B.D. in 1546. He was elected fellow of St. John's College, Cambridge in 1536, but on 19 December 1546 he was nominated by the charter of foundation an original member of Trinity College. He was one of the witnesses present at Stephen Gardiner's sermon at St. Paul's Cathedral on 1 July 1548, and in June 1549 took part on the Catholic side in the disputations before Nicholas Ridley at Cambridge. A year later he was one of the disputants against Martin Bucer, whom he subsequently attacked in a course of lectures on the Epistles to Timothy, and in February 1551 he was accused before the privy council of stirring up opposition to Edward VI's religious proceedings. On 25 November and 3 December following he took part in the disputations on the Eucharist in William Cecil's and Sir Richard Morison's houses.

At Queen Mary's accession Young's services were recognised by his creation as D.D. at Cambridge in 1553. incorporation at Oxford on 14 April 1554, and appointment as master of Pembroke Hall, Cambridge, on Ridley's deprivation, and canon of Ely in succession to Matthew Parker (12 April 1554). He was vice-chancellor of Cambridge from 1553 to 1555, when he became Regius Professor of Divinity. In this capacity he delivered a series of lectures entitled Enarrationes Joelis prophetae, which he dedicated to Cardinal Pole, and which are extant. He was sent to dispute with Thomas Cranmer, Ridley, and Hugh Latimer at Oxford in 1554, took an active part in the measures at Cambridge for Catholicism, and preached at St. Paul's on 14 and 21 February 1557, and at St. Mary Spital on 20 April.

After Elizabeth's accession he was deprived of his mastership by the university visitors on 20 July 1559, and committed to prison in the Counter, Wood Street, London, for refusing the oath. He was transferred to the Marshalsea Prison before 1574, being temporarily released on 13 June of that year on surety of Gregory Young, grocer, of London, who may have been his brother; and in 1575 he was allowed to spend the summer at Bath for his health's sake. On 28 July 1577 he was transferred to the custody of the dean of Canterbury, but, the dean's persuasion having no effect upon his religious views, he was on 18 February 1578 committed to the queen's bench. In 1580 he was moved to Wisbech Castle, where he is said to have died in October of that year. In an inscription on a portrait belonging to Cambridge University he is said to have died in 1579.

== Works ==
Young's various disputations with Bucer and others are extant; others of a like nature are printed in John Foxe's Actes and Monuments. Separately published was De Schismate . . . liber unus, Louvain, 1573; republished Douay, 1603.

== Notes ==
Academic offices
| Preceded by Martin Bucer | Regius Professor of Divinity at Cambridge; 1555–1557 | Succeeded by Thomas Sedgwick |
| Preceded by Nicholas Ridley | Master of Pembroke College, Cambridge; 1554-1559 | Succeeded by Edmund Grindal |
