= Alfred Marshall (RAF officer) =

British flying ace of WWII

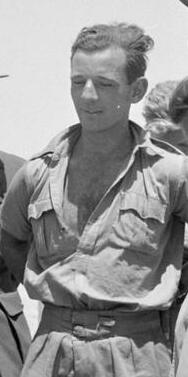
- Marshall at Sidi Heneish airfield in Egypt
- Born: 1915; Portsmouth, Hampshire, United Kingdom
- Died: 27 November 1944 (aged 28–29); Near Castle Camps, Cambridgeshire, United Kingdom
- Burial place: Hitchin Cemetery, Hertfordshire, United Kingdom
- Military career
- Allegiance: United Kingdom
- Branch: Royal Air Force
- Service years: 1931–1944
- Rank: Flight Lieutenant
- Units: No. 73 Squadron; No. 250 Squadron; No. 25 Squadron
- Conflicts: Second World War: Battle of France; Battle of Britain; Western Desert campaign; Operation Diver
- Awards: Distinguished Flying Cross; Distinguished Flying Medal

Alfred Marshall, DFC, DFM (1915 – 27 November 1944) was a British flying ace who served with the Royal Air Force (RAF) during the Second World War. He was credited with having shot down at least eighteen aircraft, plus one V-1 flying bomb.

Born in Portsmouth, Marshall joined the RAF in 1931 as an aircraft apprentice. Qualifying as a metal worker three years later, he subsequently trained as a sergeant pilot and was posted to No. 73 Squadron several months after the commencement of the Second World War. He claimed some aerial victories while the squadron operated in France and in the subsequent Battle of Britain. In late 1940, the squadron was transferred to the Middle East and subsequently flew in the Western Desert campaign, Marshall achieving many successes, until he was rested in May 1941 and awarded the Distinguished Flying Medal. He then served as an instructor and was commissioned as an officer. He returned to operations in the Western Desert with a posting to No. 250 Squadron in April 1942, destroying more aircraft. He returned to the United Kingdom four months later to again take up instructing duties. Awarded the Distinguished Flying Cross in October 1942, he was posted to No. 25 Squadron in July 1944. Later in the year he was killed in a flying accident, when his aircraft broke up in midair during an air test.

== Early life ==
Alfred Ernest Marshall was born in 1915 at Portsmouth, the United Kingdom. He attended Worcester Royal Grammar School and once his education was completed, in January 1931, he joined the Royal Air Force (RAF) as an aircraft apprentice. He qualified as a metal worker three years later.

In 1938, Marshall volunteered to train as a pilot. Initial flight training was at No. 11 Elementary and Reserve Flying Training School at Scone near Perth before, in November, he went on to No. 10 Flying Training School at Ternhill. By this time he was married to Beatrice Mary Hagel, and the couple later had a son. During his flight instruction at Ternhill, he crashed a Hawker Audax trainer aircraft and had to be hospitalised for an extended period for his injuries.

== Second World War ==
Marshall returned to his flying training once he recovered from his injuries but the Second World War had been underway for some time by the time he was awarded his wings. In April 1940 he was sent to No. 6 Operational Training Unit (OTU) for familiarisation with the Hawker Hurricane fighter. The following month, on 13 May, he was posted to No. 73 Squadron as a sergeant pilot.

=== Battle of France ===
At the time of Marshall's arrival, the squadron was heavily engaged as part of the Advanced Air Striking Force in the Battle of France, flying its Hurricanes from Reims. He made his first claim on 19 May, sharing in the destruction of a Heinkel He 111 medium bomber. On 11 June, flying to the west of Leuven, he destroyed a Dornier Do 17 medium bomber. By this time, the squadron was providing cover for vessels arriving at Le Havre in anticipation of embarking the remaining British troops in France. It was also providing escorts for RAF bombers attacking the Germans as they crossed the Seine. Then, within a week, the squadron was withdrawn to England, where it reformed at Church Fenton.

After its campaign in France, No. 73 Squadron rested and received reinforcements before commencing training in night fighting duties, becoming operational in this respect by 7 August. It moved to Castle Camps the following month, regularly flying sorties at night over London. On 7 September Marshall probably destroyed a Messerschmitt Bf 110 heavy fighter near Tilbury but his Hurricane was damaged during this action and its engine cut out. He crash landed the aircraft nearby Burnham but was injured in doing so.

=== Western Desert ===
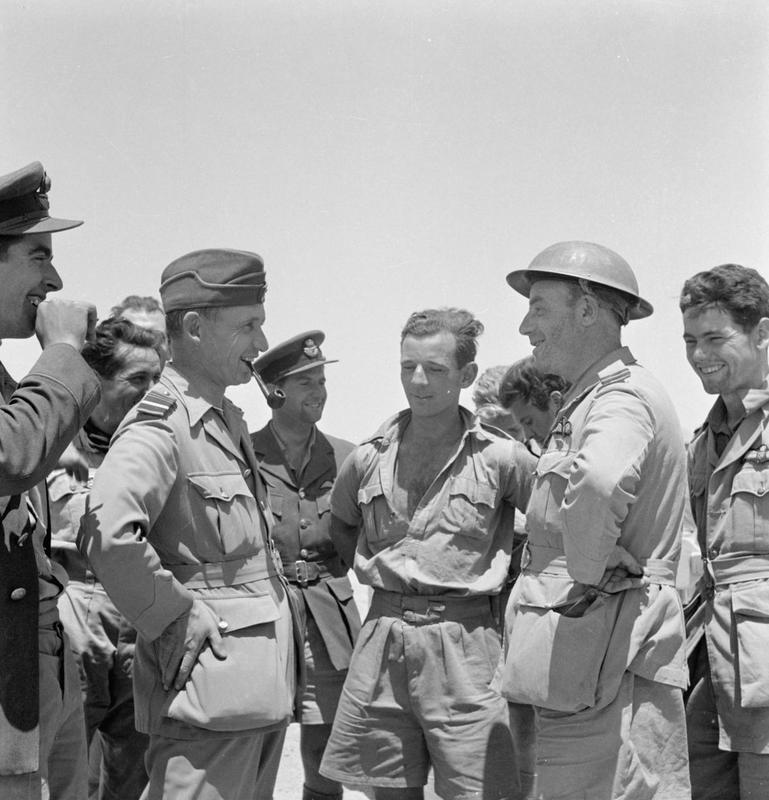
Air Marshal A. W. Tedder, Deputy Air Officer Commanding-in-Chief, Middle East Command, talks with the surviving pilots of No. 73 Squadron at Sidi Heneish; Marshall stands bareheaded in the centre

In October, having had some losses at night due to friendly fire from London's anti-aircraft defences, No. 73 Squadron recommencing training in night time operations but the following month it was ordered to relocate to the Middle East. With its Hurricanes, it embarked the aircraft carrier HMS Furious. Once it arrived at Takoradi in West Africa on 29 November, the squadron flew its Hurricanes across the continent to Egypt, where it was stationed at Heliopolis. Its pilots initially flew with No. 274 Squadron as they familiarised themselves with desert operations. On 16 December, Marshall shot down a pair of Savoia-Marchetti SM.79 medium bombers while patrolling over Bardia.

No. 73 Squadron officially became operational at Sidi Haneish Airfield on 1 January 1941. Two days later, Marshall caught several SM.79s bombing HMS Terror to the northeast of Bardia. He shot down three of these and damaged a fourth. The same afternoon, while on a sortie with Flying Officer James Storrar and Squadron Leader A. Murray, attacked an Italian airfield and caught several SM.79s on the ground. Between the three British pilots, eight of the bombers were destroyed. On 5 January, Marshall destroyed another SM.79 about 30 miles (48 km) south of Gambut.

By March, the squadron was based at Tobruk, patrolling over the city and its port. Marshall destroyed a Junkers Ju 87 dive bomber over the city on 9 April and also probably destroyed a Fiat G.50 fighter. He destroyed another G.50 two days later. A further G.50 was shot down by Marshall on 22 April. The following day he destroyed a Ju 87 and Messerschmitt Bf 109 fighter. On his return to the squadron's airfield at Tobruk, it was attacked and he was wounded. By this time, the squadron was down to five operational aircraft and it was withdrawn back to Sidi Haneish. The following month, Marshall was taken off operations. His service in the war up to that time was subsequently recognised with an award of the Distinguished Flying Medal (DFM). The citation for Marshall's DFM was published in The London Gazette and read:

This airman has displayed outstanding skill, courage and devotion to duty whilst engaged on active operations against the enemy. He has personally destroyed 15 enemy aircraft. On a recent occasion he took off to engage the enemy whilst a fierce ground attack was being made against the aerodrome.

— London Gazette, No. 35183, 6 June 1941

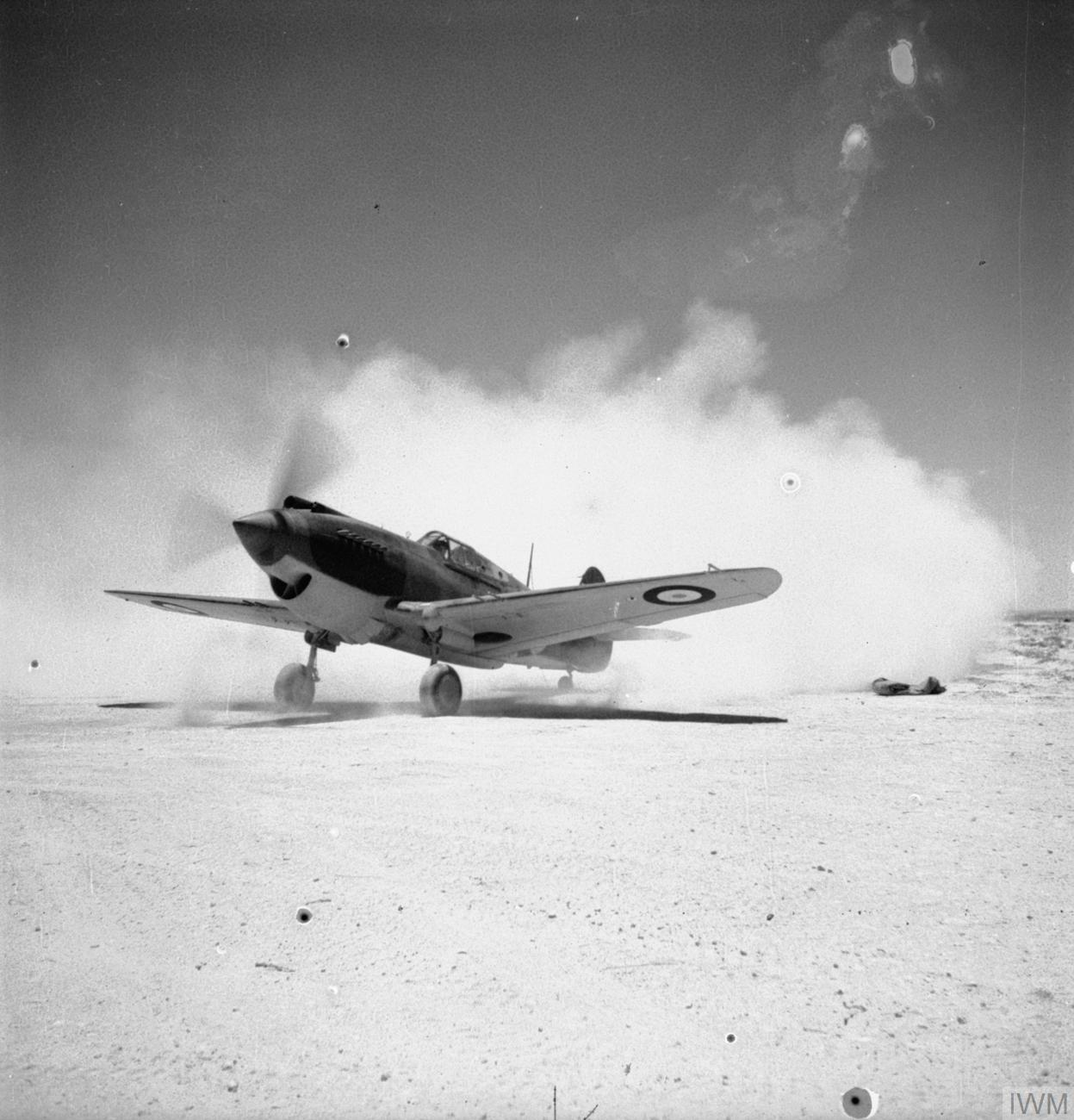
A P-40 Kittyhawk fighter of No. 250 Squadron taxiing on the airfield at Sidi Heneish

Marshall was commissioned as a pilot officer in August and then posted as an instructor to No. 71 OTU at Khartoum in the Sudan. He subsequently served in Aden at No. 73 OTU. In April 1942 he returned to operational duties with No. 250 Squadron. His new unit, equipped with P-40 Kittyhawk fighters, was based at Sidi Heneish and carried out ground support missions and bomber escort duties, and in June started working in a fighter-bomber role. On 26 June, Marshall, who shortly became a flight commander in the squadron, shared in the destruction of a Bf 109 in the vicinity of El Alimab. This was followed with his shooting down of another Bf 109 on 5 July over Landing Ground 106. Three days later he destroyed a Ju 87 over Landing Ground 21. Flying in the same area on 19 July, he shot down a Junkers Ju 52 air transport, also damaging a Ju 87 that was parked up on the ground. The following day he damaged a Junkers Ju 88 medium bomber on the ground near Fuka.

=== Later war service ===
At the start of August Marshall returned to England and shortly afterwards was promoted to flying officer. He took up a posting at No. 51 OTU at Cranfield as an instructor. He was subsequently awarded the Distinguished Flying Cross (DFC) in October.

In July 1944 Marshall, now a flight lieutenant due to being promoted to this rank the previous August, was posted to No. 25 Squadron. This was a night fighter unit, based at Coltishall and operating the De Havilland Mosquito XVII heavy fighter on intruder missions. From mid-June it was also involved in Operation Diver, the RAF's effort to intercept and destroy V-1 flying bombs targeting England. With guidance from his radar operator, Flying Officer C. Allen, Marshall destroyed a He 111 some 40 miles (64 km) to the east of Southwold on the night of 6 October. At some point during his service with the squadron, Marshall also claimed a V-1 flying bomb as destroyed.

Marshall and Allen were both killed on 27 November in a flying accident, when their Mosquito broke up after taking off Castle Camps to perform an air test. Marshall, who was survived by his wife and son, is buried at Hitchin Cemetery in Hertfordshire. He is credited with having shot down sixteen Axis aircraft, with a share in two more destroyed. He also is believed to have probably destroyed two aircraft and damaged one. One V-1 flying bomb was claimed as destroyed and Marshall also shared in the destruction of eight aircraft on the ground.
