= Claudius Gilbert =

Irish academic (1670–1742)

Claudius Gilbert (1670–1742) was an Irish academic.

He was born in Belfast and educated at Trinity College Dublin. He became a Fellow of Trinity College in 1693 and Regius Professor of Divinity in 1722. He was also Rector of Ardstraw.
