= Hugh Frederic Woodhouse =

Irish professor (1912–2010)

Hugh Frederic Woodhouse, D.D. (Dublin 1912 - Vancouver 2010) was Regius Professor of Divinity at Trinity College Dublin from 1963 to 1982.

== Education and career ==
Wodehouse was educated at Trinity College Dublin and ordained in 1938. After curacies in Belfast and Bangor he held incumbencies at Aghalee and Newtownards. He was Professor of Ecclesiastical History at Wycliffe College, Toronto from 1951 to 1954; Principal of the Anglican Theology College in Vancouver from 1954 to 1959; and Professor of Dogmatic theology at the University of King's College, Halifax, NS from 1959 until his Regius appointment. He was elected Fellow of TCD in 1974.
