= Luke Challoner =

Irish academic

Luke Challoner, DD (1550–1613) was an Irish academic.

Challoner was born in Dublin and educated at Trinity College, Cambridge.

He was one of the three founding fellows of Trinity College Dublin. In 1597 he was appointed a Prebendary of Mulhuddart at St Patrick's Cathedral, Dublin in 1597. He was the first Regius Professor of Divinity at TCD, serving from 1600 until his death on 27 April 1613.
