= Richard Smyth (theologian) =

Oxford professor (1499/1500–1563)

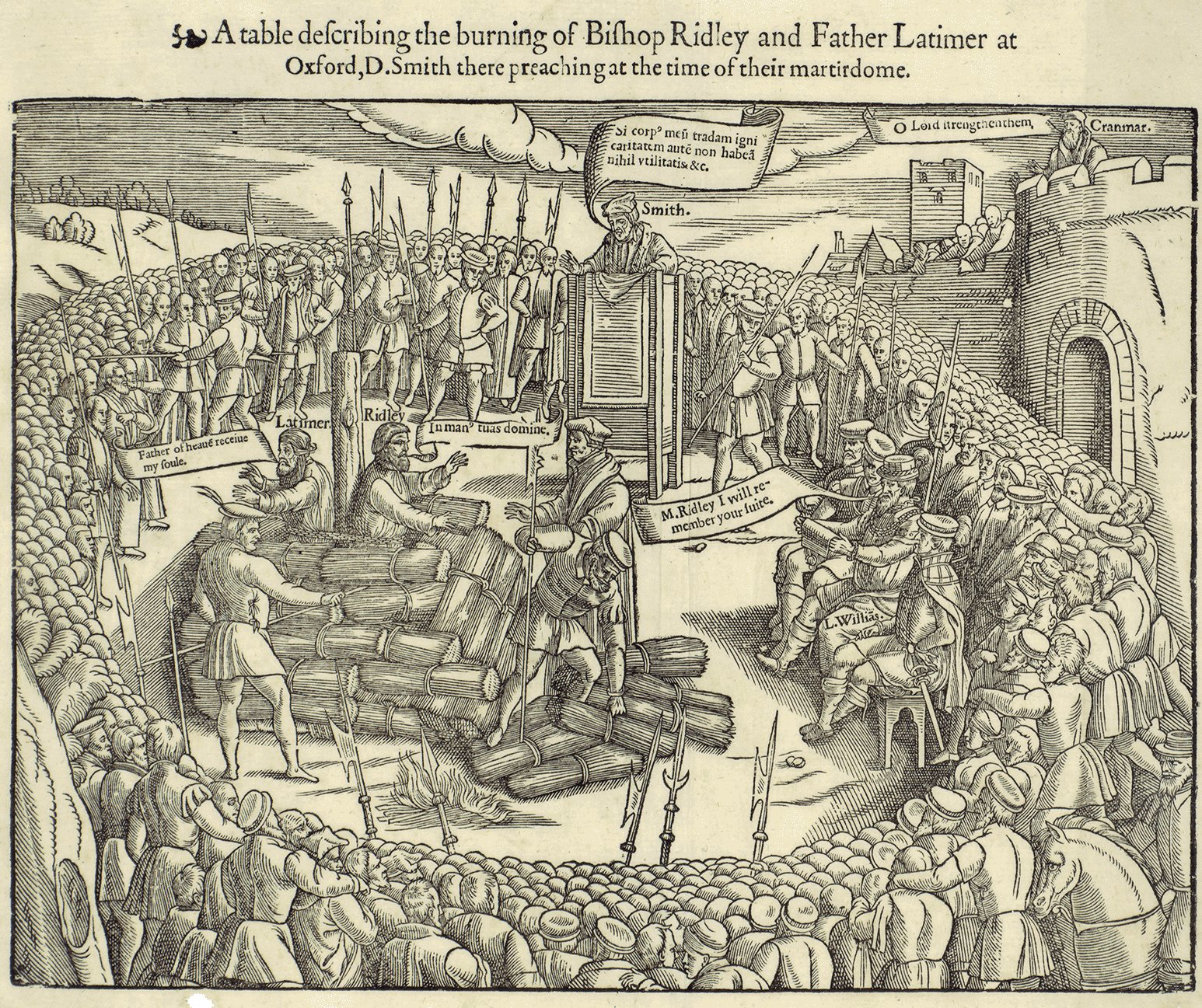
Smyth reading 1 Corinthians 13:3 ("If I give my body to be burned and have not love, I gain nothing") at the burning of Hugh Latimer and Nicholas Ridley in a woodcut from Foxe's Book of Martyrs.

Richard Smyth (or Smith) (1499/1500, Worcestershire, England – 9 July 1563, Douai, France) was the first person to hold the office of Regius Professor of Divinity in the University of Oxford and the first Chancellor of the University of Douai.

== Life ==
Educated at Merton College, Oxford, and taking his MA degree in 1530, he became Registrar of the University of Oxford in 1532 then (by royal appointment) its first Regius Professor of divinity in 1536. Taking his doctorate in divinity on 10 July 1536, he was subsequently made master of Whittington College, London, rector of St Dunstan-in-the-East and then Cuxham, Oxfordshire, principal of St Alban's Hall, Oxford, and divinity reader at Magdalen College.

Some (possibly unreliable) accounts have him renouncing Catholicism and the authority of the Pope at Oxford and (on 15 May 1547) at St Paul's Cross on the accession of the Protestant Edward VI. However, even if the accounts are reliable, soon afterwards he became a Catholic again and was thus replaced in his professorship with Peter Martyr. He and Martyr were to hold a public disputation in 1549, but fled to Leuven before it could be held.

On release he left to become professor of divinity at Louvain, returning on the accession of Mary I to become canon of Christ Church and royal chaplain and take a major part in proceedings against Thomas Cranmer, Nicholas Ridley, and Hugh Latimer. Regaining most of his benefices, he lost them all again when Elizabeth I succeeded Mary, and was briefly imprisoned in the house of Archbishop Matthew Parker. On release, he again fled to the continent, this time to Douai, where Mary's widower Philip II of Spain appointed him dean of St. Peter's church and then (on Philip II's inauguration of University of Douai on 5 October 1562) the university's chancellor and professor of theology.

== Works ==
- Assertion and Defence of the Sacrament of the Altar (1546)
- Defence of the Sacrifice of the Mass (1547)
- Defensio celibatus sacerdotum (1550)
- Diatriba de hominis justificatione (1550)
- Buckler of the Catholic Faith (1555–56)
- De Missa Sacrificio (1562)
- refutations of John Calvin and Christopher Carlile, of Philipp Melanchthon, John Jewell, and Theodore Beza, all published in 1562.

== Bibliography ==
- J. Andreas Löwe, Richard Smyth and the Language of Orthodoxy: Re-imagining Tudor Catholic Polemicism (Studies in Medieval and Reformation Traditions: History, Culture, Religion, Ideas, 96; Leiden: Brill, 2003).

Academic offices
Preceded by none	Regius Professor of Divinity at Oxford; 1535–1548	Succeeded by Pietro Martire Vermigli
Preceded by Pietro Martire Vermigli	Regius Professor of Divinity at Oxford; 1554–1556	Succeeded by Juan de Villagarcía
Preceded by John Warner	Vice-Chancellor of Oxford University; 1555–1556	Succeeded by William Tresham
Preceded by Juan de Villagarcía	Regius Professor of Divinity at Oxford; 1559–1560	Succeeded by Lawrence Humphrey
