= Thomas Sedgwick =

English theologian

Thomas Sedgwick (Segiswycke) (died 1573 in a Yorkshire prison) was an English Roman Catholic theologian. An unfriendly hand in 1562 describes him as "learned but not very wise".

Thomas Sedgwick was educated at the University of Cambridge, where he graduated B.A. in 1529/30 and became a Fellow of Peterhouse in 1531. He argued against Martin Bucer in 1550, alongside Andrew Perne and John Young; and against Thomas Cranmer, Hugh Latimer, and Nicholas Ridley in April 1554, when he was incorporated Doctor of Divinity at the University of Oxford. In 1546 he became a Fellow of Trinity College, Cambridge, where he was vice-master 1554–55. He had been defeated by Andrew Perne in a contest for the mastership at Peterhouse; sources differ on whether he had the support of Stephen Gardiner.

Under Queen Mary he became Regius professor of divinity at Cambridge in 1557, and in 1558 both rector of Stanhope, Durham and vicar of Gainford, Durham. He was deprived of these three preferments after the accession of Queen Elizabeth. He had also been rector of Erwarton, Suffolk in 1552, become Lady Margaret's Professor of Divinity in 1554, made vicar of Enfield, Middlesex in 1555, and rector of Toft, Cambridgeshire in 1556, but had given up these four preferments before Queen Mary died.

He was restricted to within ten miles of Richmond, Yorkshire, from 1562 to 1570, when he seems to have been sent to prison at York.

== Notes ==
Academic offices
Preceded by John Young	Regius Professor of Divinity at Cambridge; 1557–1559	Succeeded by James Pilkington
