= Richard Randall Hartford =

Irish Anglican priest and professor of divinity (1904–1962)

Richard Randall Hartford (21 September 1904 – 7 August 1962) was Regius Professor of Divinity at Trinity College Dublin from 1957 until his death.

Hartford was educated at Kilkenny College; and Trinity College Dublin. He was Scholar of the House in 1926; won the Downes Prize for Written Composition in 1927; and the Large Gold Medal in 1928. He was ordained in 1928. He was a curate at SS Philip and James, Booterstown from 1928 to 1931; and a Minor Canon of St Patrick's Cathedral, Dublin from 1930 to 1935. He became a Lecturer at TCD in 1931. and was Archbishop King Professor of Divinity in Dublin University from 1936 to 1957. He was a canon of St Patricks (Prebendary of Maynooth) from 1945 to 1957, and chancellor from 1957.

His father in law was Archbishop Arthur Barton.
