= Fort Halifax (Maine) =

- U.S. National Register of Historic Places
- U.S. National Historic Landmark
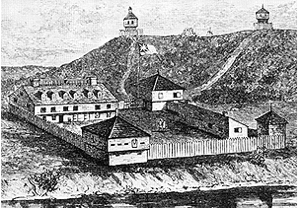
- Fort Halifax

- Location within Maine
- Interactive map of Fort Halifax
- Location: On U.S. 201 west of Winslow, Maine
- Coordinates: 44°32′23″N 69°37′47″W
- Built: 1754-1755
- NRHP reference No.: 68000015

Significant dates
- Added to NRHP: November 24, 1968
- Designated NHL: October 18, 1968

Fort Halifax is a former British outpost on the banks of the Sebasticook River, just above its mouth at the Kennebec River, in Winslow, Maine. Originally built as a wooden palisaded fort in 1754, during the French and Indian War, only a single blockhouse survives. The oldest blockhouse in the United States, it is preserved as Fort Halifax State Historic Site, and is open to the public in the warmer months. The fort guarded Wabanaki canoe routes that reached to the St. Lawrence and Penobscot Valleys via the Chaudière-Kennebec and Sebasticook-Souadabscook rivers. The blockhouse was declared a National Historic Landmark and added to the National Register of Historic Places in 1968.

== French and Indian War ==
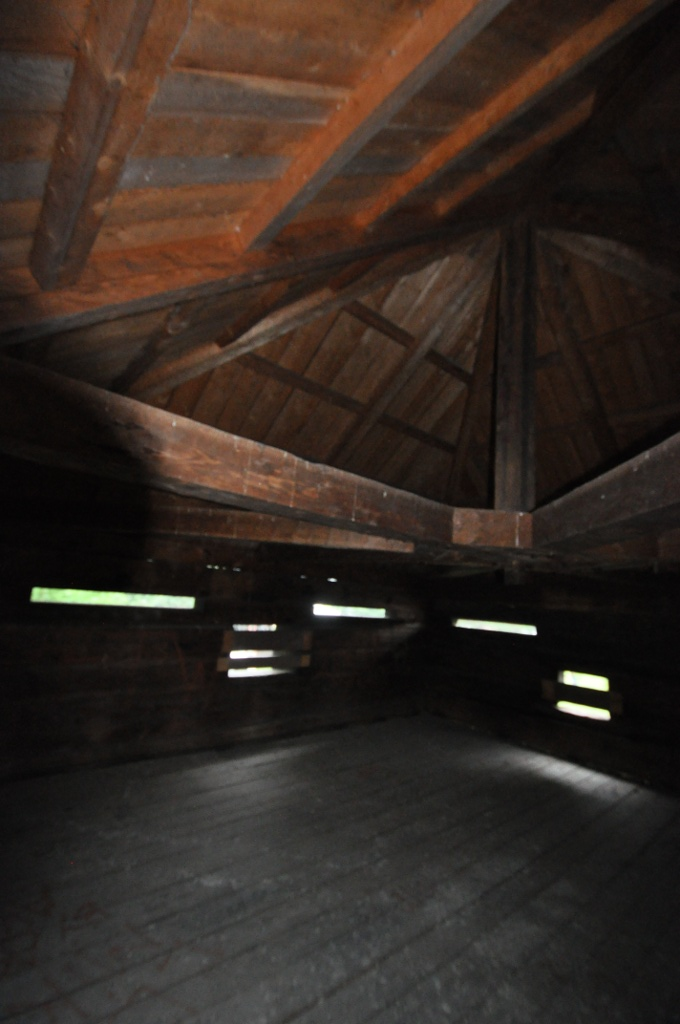
Interior of the blockhouse

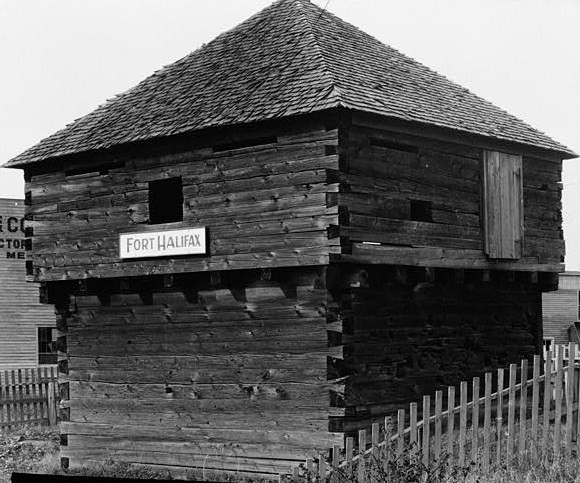
Fort Halifax (1936)

Fort Halifax was a fort on the north bank of the Sebasticook River. It had previously been the location of the native Fort Taconnet or Taconock, which natives burned upon the approach of Major Benjamin Church during King William's War in the late 17th century. Its blockhouse, which survives, is the oldest blockhouse in the United States. It was part of a garrison built by the Province of Massachusetts Bay from 1754 to 1756 at the outset of the French and Indian War. On July 25, 1754, Major General John Winslow arrived with a force of 600 soldiers to establish the fort at the confluence of the Kennebec River with the Sebasticook River. William Shirley was on this expedition. The palisaded defense was intended to prevent Canadiens and their Native American allies from using the Kennebec River valley as a route to attack English settlements. Further, Massachusetts was extending its border into the former region of Acadia and threatening the capital of Canada, Quebec.

Fort Richmond was dismantled in 1755 when Fort Shirley (named after William Shirley, also called Frankfort, located in present-day Dresden), Fort Western and Fort Halifax were built upriver.

In 1754, Fort Halifax was built by order of the Massachusetts General Court on the peninsula at the confluence of the Sebasticook and Kennebec rivers. The fort was named for George Montagu-Dunk, 2nd Earl of Halifax, the British colonial secretary. A settlement subsequently sprang up under its protection, and was named in honor of Major-General John Winslow, of Marshfield, Massachusetts who had overseen the fort's construction.

The Natives raided the fort in the fall of 1754.

In 1755, the commanding officer, Captain William Lithgow, discontinued Major-General Winslow's original plan for the fort, citing limited manpower and expense. The fort was made smaller and more defensible and was completed in 1756. The Canadiens and Natives immediately made plans to destroy the fort.Brodhead, John Romeyn (1858). Documents Relative to the Colonial History of the State of New York. Vol. 10. Albany: Weed, Parsons and Co. pp. 277, 291. In May 1756, the natives attacked soldiers from the fort.

In 1756, near Topshee, Col Lithgow and a party of 8 men were ambushed by 17 natives, both sides suffering the loss of two men. The natives later killed two more white men in the area. The fort was abandoned in 1766, and was sold into private hands.

== American Revolution ==
In September 1775, Fort Halifax hosted troops under Colonel Benedict Arnold on their expedition to Quebec City. At the end of the American Revolution, most of Fort Halifax was dismantled. By the early 19th century, only the blockhouse on the Sebasticook still stood. Later in the century, tourists visited the fort, especially railway passengers and students from Colby College. These guests carved chunks of wood from the blockhouse as souvenirs.

== 19th - 20th Century ==
In the nineteenth and twentieth centuries, ownership of Fort Halifax blockhouse changed hands numerous times. The structures of the fort deteriorated, and eventually everything except the surviving blockhouse was demolished. From 1924 to 1966, the Fort Halifax Chapter of the Daughters of the American Revolution owned the blockhouse and was responsible for its upkeep. The DAR turned the property over to the state in 1966. The town purchased the property surrounding the blockhouse in 1976 and 1982, with the plan to rehabilitate the area and develop a park.

On April 1, 1987, a severe flood dismantled the blockhouse. Twenty-two original logs were recovered, some of them found as far south as forty miles. The blockhouse was reconstructed on its original site in 1988. That fall, the rebuilt blockhouse was dedicated in a ceremony that drew hundreds of guests.

The Town of Winslow in 2011 drafted plans to rebuild some of the fort and to expand and improve interpretive displays, trails, and recreational opportunities at the site.

== See also ==
- National Register of Historic Places listings in Kennebec County, Maine
- List of National Historic Landmarks in Maine
