= Brian Downs =

English literary scholar and linguist

Vice-Chancellor of the University of Cambridge
- In office 1955–1957
- Preceded by: Henry Willink
- Succeeded by: Edgar Adrian

Master of Christ's College, Cambridge
- In office 1950–1963
- Preceded by: Charles E. Raven
- Succeeded by: Alexander R. Todd

Personal details
- Born: Brian Westerdale Downs; 4 July 1893
- Died: 3 March 1984 (aged 90)
- Citizenship: United Kingdom
- Education: Christ's College, Cambridge
- Awards: Commander of the Order of the Polar Star (Sweden); Officer of the Legion of Honour (France)

Brian Westerdale Downs (4 July 1893 – 3 March 1984) was an English literary scholar and linguist. He served as Master of Christ's College, Cambridge, from 1950 to 1963 and Vice-Chancellor of the University of Cambridge from 1955 to 1957. From 1950 to 1960, he was the Professor of Scandinavian Studies at Cambridge.

== Early life ==
Downs was born on 4 July 1893 in Kingston upon Hull. He was educated at Abbotsholme School, then an all-boys private boarding school in Uttoxeter, Staffordshire. In 1912, he matriculated into Christ's College, Cambridge, having been awarded a scholarship. In 1915, he graduated Bachelor of Arts (BA) with first-class honours in Modern and Medieval Languages (German, Old Norse and Anglo-Saxon).

== Academic career ==
In 1918, Downs was appointed a college lecturer in English and modern languages at Christ's College, Cambridge. In the summer of 1918, with hostilities still going on, Downs held a meeting in his rooms leading to the foundation of the Modern Humanities Research Association, dedicated to the study of European languages. The following year, in 1919, he was elected a Fellow of the college. From 1920, he was also a university lecturer in English and modern languages. In 1928, he was appointed a college tutor. He served as a Member of the Cambridge University Council, the governing body of the University of Cambridge, from 1939 to 1944. In 1947, he became Senior Tutor and Vice-Master of Christ's. In 1950, he was appointed the 31st Master of Christ's College, Cambridge. The same year, the Chair of Scandinavian Studies was established and he was elected to the position becoming a professor. From 1955 to 1957, served as the then part-time Vice-Chancellor of the University of Cambridge. He retired in 1963.

== Later life ==
Downs remained in Cambridge following his retirement and lived on Grange Road for a number of years. He later moved into the Hope Nursing Home in Cambridge and died there on 3 March 1984. A diabetic, he had contracted bronchopneumonia which proved fatal. His memorial service was held in the chapel of Christ's College, Cambridge, on 2 June 1984.

== Personal life ==
On 1 July 1924, Downs married Elsie Ada Maud Drew (1887–1965). She was a fellow of Girton College, Cambridge, where she tutored in English literature. Together they had a son, Jonathan Downs, in 1930. Mother and son moved to the United States of America during World War II but, at the age of nine, Jonathan was hit and killed by a truck while outside his home in Northampton, Massachusetts. Their marriage subsequently broke down and they divorced. On 14 September 1946, Downs married for a second time to Evelyn Faith Marion Wrangham (née Doubble) (1907–1977). She was a widow who had worked as his secretary before their marriage.

== Honours ==
Downs was awarded an honorary Doctor of Letters (DLitt) degree by the University of Hull. He was appointed Commander of the Order of the Polar Star (KNO) by Sweden in 1954 and Officer of the Legion of Honour by France.

Academic offices
| Preceded by Charles E. Raven | Master of Christ's College, Cambridge; 1950 to 1963 | Succeeded by Alexander R. Todd, Baron Todd |
| Preceded by Henry Willink | Vice-Chancellor of the University of Cambridge; 1955 to 1957 | Succeeded by Edgar Adrian, 1st Baron Adrian |
