= Charles E. Raven =

English theologian

The Reverend Charles E. Raven QHC FBA
- Raven in 1939
- Born: Charles Earle Raven; 4 July 1885; London, England
- Died: 8 July 1964 (aged 79); Cambridge, England
- Title: Vice-Chancellor of the University of Cambridge (1947–1949)
- Spouses: Margaret E. B. Wollaston (m. 1910; died 1944); Ethel Moors (m. 1954; died 1954); Hélène Jeanty (m. 1956)
- Children: Mary; Betty; John; Margaret

Ecclesiastical career
- Religion: Christianity (Anglican)
- Church: Church of England
- Ordained: 1909

Academic background
- Education: Gonville and Caius College, Cambridge
- Influences: Henri Bergson; James Bethune-Baker; Henry Melvill Gwatkin; Pierre Teilhard de Chardin; Evelyn Underhill

Academic work
- Discipline: Theology
- School or tradition: Christian pacifism; Christian socialism; evangelical Anglicanism; theological liberalism
- Institutions: Emmanuel College, Cambridge; Christ's College, Cambridge
- Influenced: Arthur Peacocke; Ian Ramsey

Charles Earle Raven QHC FBA (4 July 1885 – 8 July 1964) was an English theologian and Anglican priest. He was Regius Professor of Divinity at Cambridge University (1932–1950) and Master of Christ's College, Cambridge (1939–1950). His works have been influential in the history of science publishing on the positive effects that theology has had upon modern science.

== Career ==
Raven was born in Paddington, London on 4 July 1885, and was educated at Uppingham School. He obtained an open classical scholarship at Gonville and Caius College, Cambridge, and then became lecturer in divinity, fellow and dean of Emmanuel College, Cambridge. In 1932, he was elected Regius Professor of Divinity at Cambridge, a position he held until 1950. He was Master of Christ's College, Cambridge (1939–1950).

He was a clergyman in the Church of England, and attained the rank of canon. During the First World War he served as a chaplain to the forces and what he witnessed led him to take a pacifist position, a subject on which he wrote extensively for the rest of his life. As a pacifist, he was an active supporter of the Peace Pledge Union and the Fellowship of Reconciliation.

He first married Margaret Ermyntrude Buchanan Wollaston in 1910, with whom he had four children. Raven was the father of John Raven, the classical scholar and botanist, and grandfather of Andrew Raven and Sarah Raven.

His third marriage was to Hélène Jeanty, a Belgian widow whose husband had been killed by the occupying Germans in World War II. They met while she was working for the World Council of Churches (WCC). They worked together on reconciliation between students of different races, a continuation of her WCC work helping displaced Jews and Germans. She outlived Raven, dying on 9 October 1990 and, continuing the charitable work during her lifetime, left £150,000 to Christ's College to support medical students from overseas.

Raven was the Gifford Lecturer for 1950–1952 in Natural Religion and Christian Theology, at Edinburgh University. He was president of the Field Studies Council from 1953 to 1957 and of the Botanical Society of the British Isles from 1951 to 1955. He won the James Tait Black Award in 1947 for his book English Naturalists from Neckam to Ray.

Some of his writings have been described as an early example of ecotheology.

== Evolution ==
Raven was an advocate of non-Darwinian evolutionary theories such as Lamarckism. He also supported the theistic evolution of Pierre Teilhard de Chardin.

Historian Peter J. Bowler has written that Raven's book The Creator Spirit, "outlined the case for a nonmaterialistic biology as the foundation for a renewed natural theology."

== List of selected publications ==
- What think ye of Christ? (1916)
- Christian Socialism, 1848-1854 (1920)
- Apollinarianism: An Essay on the Christology of the Early Church (1923)
- In Praise of Birds (1925)
- The Creator Spirit (1927)
- Women and the Ministry (1929)
- A Wanderer's Way (1929)
- The Life and Teaching of Jesus Christ (1933)
- Raven, Charles E. (1950) [1942]. John Ray, naturalist: his life and works (2nd ed.). Cambridge [England]: Cambridge University Press. ISBN 9780521310833.
- Science, Religion, and the Future, a course of eight lectures (1943)
- Raven, Charles E. (1947). English Naturalists from Neckam to Ray: A Study of the Making of the Modern World. Cambridge University Press. p. 162. ISBN 978-1-108-01634-6.
- Alex Wood: the man and his message (1952)
- The Theological Basis of Christian Pacifism. London: The Fellowship of Reconciliation (1952)
- Natural Religion and Christian Theology (1953)
- Science, Medicine and Morals: A Survey and a Suggestion (1959)
- Paul and the Gospel of Jesus (1960)
- Teilhard de Chardin: Scientist and Seer (1962)

== See also ==
- Relationship between religion and science

Academic offices
Preceded by Alexander Nairne	Regius Professor of Divinity at the University of Cambridge; 1932–1950	Succeeded by Michael Ramsey
Preceded by Charles Galton Darwin	Master of Christ's College, Cambridge; 1939–1950	Succeeded by Brian Downs
Preceded by Henry Thirkill	Vice-Chancellor of the University of Cambridge; 1947–1949	Succeeded by Sydney Castle Roberts
Preceded by Niels Bohr	Gifford Lecturer at the University of Edinburgh; 1950–1952	Succeeded by Arnold J. Toynbee
Awards
Preceded by Richard Aldington	James Tait Black Memorial Prize for Biography; 1947	Succeeded by Percy Scholes
