= William Lithgow (judge) =

Hon. William Lithgow
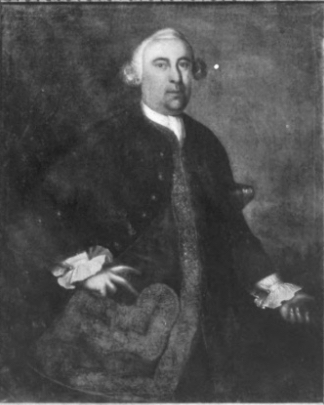
- Born: 1715; Derry, Ireland
- Died: 20 December 1798; Georgetown of the Province of Massachusetts Bay (Present-day Maine)
- Relatives: Sarah (Noble) Lithgow, wife
- Military career
- Allegiance: British America
- Branch: Massachusetts Bay Colonial Militia
- Service years: 1734 – 1746, Captain; 1751 – 1758, Colonel; 1758 – 1760, Justice of the Peace; 1760 – 1798, Judge in court of Common Pleas
- Commands: Fort Richmond; Fort Halifax

Hon. William Lithgow (c. 1715 – 20 December 1798) was a judge for the Court of Common Pleas of Lincoln County, when Maine was under the jurisdiction of the Province of Massachusetts Bay. Lithgow also served in the Massachusetts Bay Colonial Militia for twenty years before and during the French and Indian War.

== Biography ==
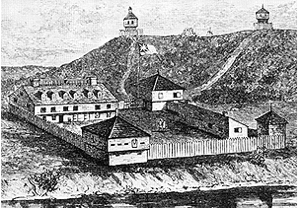
Lithgow - commander of Fort Halifax (Maine)

William Lithgow's family, emigrated from Derry, Ireland, after leaving Scotland due to the fallout from the Jacobite rising of 1689. They arrived in Boston on the ship Olive, chartered by Robert Temple. William was just three years old when he and his family came to the Americas. From Boston, the Lithgows traveled north to present day Maine, at the mouth of the Kennebec River near Merrymeeting Bay, where William's father, Robert, prospected land in Topsham territory around 1720. However, due to incessant Indian attacks, the Lithgow family was forced to flee, seeking refuge at Fort George in Brunswick, about four miles distance.

Like his father, William joined the Massachusetts Bay Colonial Militia when he was about 19. He was attached to the garrison of Fort George, and then promoted to command Fort Richmond on the Kennebec.

In 1746, Lithgow settled in Georgetown, where he married Sarah Noble, the daughter of Lt. Col. Arthur Noble, who fought to the death against the French Canadians at the Battle of Grand Pre in Nova Scotia.

In 1748-54 was in command at Fort Richmond, Lithgow was commission colonel and in 1754 was appointed by Gov. William Shirley to command the garrison at Fort Halifax, established near the junction of the Sebasticook and Kennebec Rivers. In 1752, the local Indians reported, "Capt. Lithgow of Richmond is a good-natured and faithful Man in his posts: He takes a tender care of our young men when they are drunk, and rude to him."

After a few years, Lithgow became a justice of the peace and then appointed as a judge for the court of Common Pleas, in Lincoln County. In 1791, he ran for Massachusetts's 8th congressional district, losing to incumbent George Thatcher.

He died on 20 December 1798, and it was said of him that "he was a cultivated and courteous gentleman, as well as an energetic and faithful officer."

== See also ==
- Seven Years' War

Descendants

- Arthur Lithgow
- Ian Lithgow
- John Lithgow
- Manuel García Lithgow

== Sources ==
- Descendants of John Bridge, by William Frederick Bridge, 1884
- "The New York Genealogical and Biographical Record" Vol.XXIX, 1898, The Lithgow Family
- The Maine historical and genealogical recorder, Volume 7, By Stephen Marion Watson, 1893, p. 236
- Maine and its role in American art, 1740-1963 By Gertrud A. Mellon, 1963
