= Juan de Villagarcía =

Spanish theologian (1529–1564)

Juan de Villagarcía (John de Villa Garcia, known as Joannes Fraterculus or Friar John) (ca. 1529 - 1564) was a Spanish Dominican from Valladolid, known as the witness to one of the statements of confession and recantation by Thomas Cranmer.

== Life ==
He was a pupil of Bartolomé de Carranza, and came to England with Carranza, brought by Philip II of Spain. He was a Fellow and Praelector in Theology of Magdalen Hall, Oxford in 1555.

He was Regius Professor of Divinity at the University of Oxford in 1555. He was the recipient of degrees of B.D. and D.D. at Oxford, in 1555 and 1558 respectively.

He first met and discussed with Cranmer at Christ Church, Oxford, on 31 December 1555. On January 1, 1556, in another discussion based on patristic texts, Cranmer was willing to sign the first of his statements, on papal supremacy, conditional on the history of the Council of Nicaea. Later in January they clashed on much worse terms, after the news of Cranmer's disgrading as Archbishop had reached England. They met again at the Bocardo Prison adjacent to St Michael at the Northgate, when Villagarcía and John Harpsfield interrogated Cranmer in the middle of February. On 26 February there was another statement, written in Latin and probably by Villagarcía, that was signed by Cranmer and witnessed by Villagarcía and Henry Syddall. This was the fifth statement written or signed by Cranmer; he himself spoke of it as a return to the Catholic faith and asked for sacramental absolution. On 20 March, the day of Cranmer's execution, Villagarcía accompanied him to the University Church of St Mary the Virgin, where Cranmer preached, and exchanged words in Latin with him afterwards. These are variously reported in Foxe's Book of Martyrs and Cranmer's Recantacyons, but concerned Cranmer's denial of papal supremacy from the pulpit.

On his return to Spain, Villagarcía found that Carranza was in trouble with the Spanish Inquisition for alleged Lutheranism, and his name was linked to the charges.

== Notes ==
Academic offices
| Preceded by Richard Smyth | Regius Professor of Divinity at Oxford; 1556–1559 | Succeeded by Richard Smyth |
