= Recantation =

Public act of denial of a previously published opinion or belief

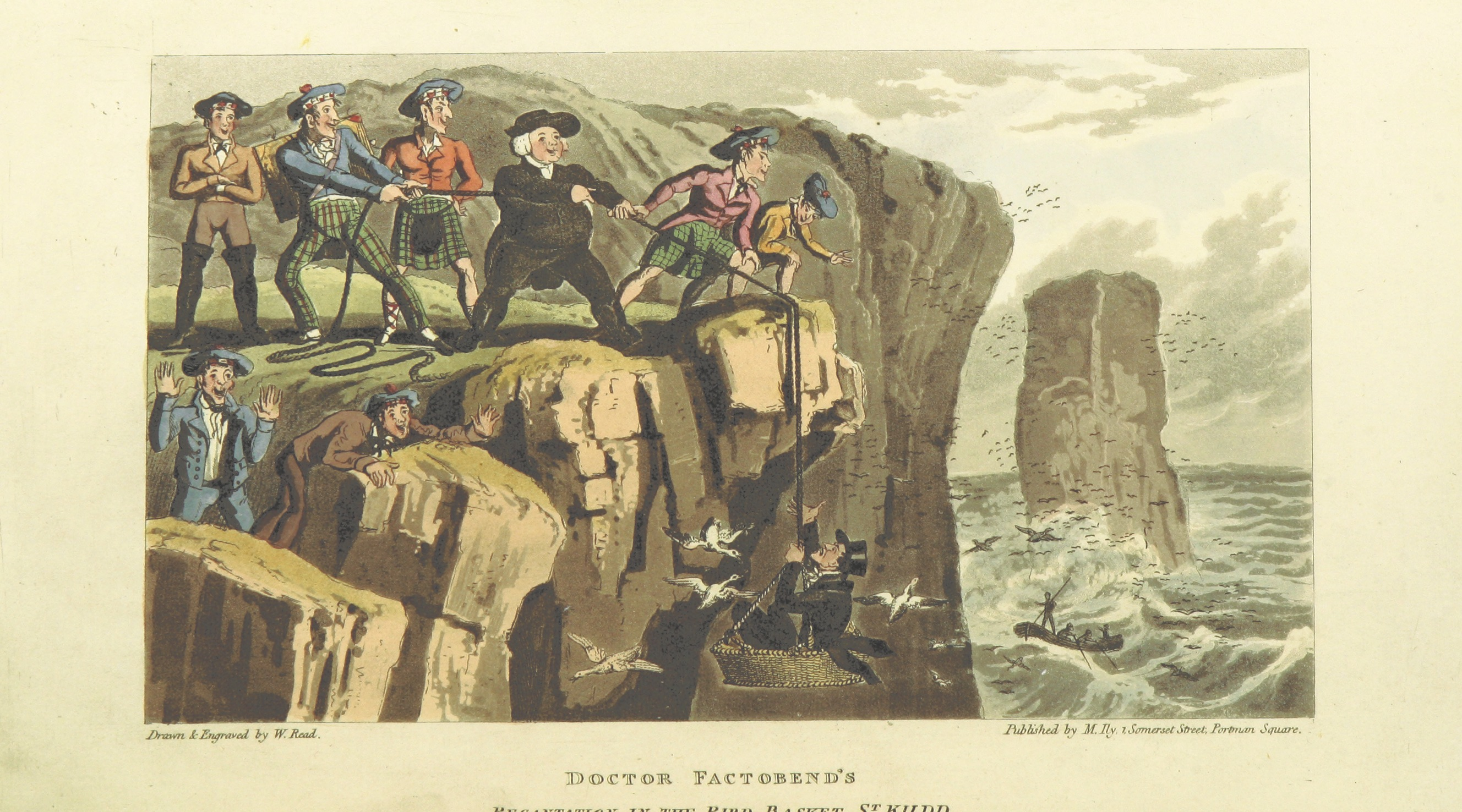
Doctor Factobend's Recantation in the Bird Basket, St Kilda, a plate from The Tour of Doctor Prosody (William Combe, 1821)

Recantation is a public denial of a previously published opinion or belief. The word is derived from the Latin re cantare ("sing again"). It is related to repentance and revocation.

== Philosophy ==
In philosophy, recantation is linked to a genuine change of opinion, often caused by a serious event which reveals a better or more complete representation of a presumed truth. For example, Retractationes was the title of a 5th-century book by Bishop Augustine of Hippo correcting his former writings as an ordinary teacher of rhetoric prior to his becoming a cleric which he described as "a recantation of opinion with admission of error".

In classical Roman poetry, after deliberately describing something extravagantly or hyperbolically for memorable dramatic effect, recantation was used to briefly redefine the material subject fairly and honestly.

== Religion ==
In religion, recantation may be required to avoid punishment or imposed to obtain pardon from a sin such as:

- Heresy (wrong choice) which means questioning or doubting dogmatic established beliefs
- Blasphemy (evil-speaking) which is the act of insulting or showing contempt for a religious deity.
- Apostasy which implies either revolt against or renunciation or abandonment of a prescribed religious duty, especially disloyalty sedition and defection.

One of the more famous recantations in religious history was that of Thomas Cranmer, by which he recanted the Protestant or Anglican faith in favor of the Roman Catholic beliefs, after his imprisonment by Queen Mary.

In Protestantism, recantation may be requested by or ordered from an ecclesiastical authority such as a synod or ecumenical council. In the Roman Catholic Church, the Inquisition, Holy Office, or even on rare occasion the contemporary Congregation for the Doctrine of the Faith required an act of renunciation to enforce an orthodoxy.

In a secular state, if ordered to recant by religious authority, one who refused to recant may be anathematized or excommunicated or subject to social exclusion. In a theocracy, an order to recant may include threats of physical punishment such as prison or corporal punishment which may include death or lethal cruelty such as the burning at the stake suffered by Joan of Arc.
