= Regius Professor of Divinity =

Professorships at Oxford, Cambridge and Trinity College Dublin

The Regius Professorships of Divinity are amongst the oldest professorships at the University of Oxford and the University of Cambridge. A third chair existed for a period at Trinity College Dublin.

The Oxford and Cambridge chairs were founded by Henry VIII. The chair at Cambridge originally had a stipend of £40 per year (which is still paid to the incumbent by Trinity College), later increased by James I with the rectory of Somersham, Cambridgeshire.

== Professors at Oxford ==
- Richard Smyth, DD, Fellow of Merton, and Principal of St Alban Hall (1535)
- Peter Martyr, DD, of the University of Padua, Canon of Christ Church (1548)
- Richard Smyth again; Canon of Christ Church (1554)
- Juan de Villagarcia, known as Joannes Fraterculus (a Spanish Dominican), BD, Divinity Reader of Magdalen College (1556)
- Richard Smyth again (1559)
- Lawrence Humphrey, MA, Fellow, afterwards President, of Magdalen; DD (1560)
- Thomas Holland, DD, Fellow of Balliol; Rector of Exeter (1589)
- Robert Abbot, DD, Master of Balliol; afterwards Bishop of Salisbury (1612)
- John Prideaux, DD, Rector of Exeter; afterwards Bishop of Worcester (1615)
- Robert Sanderson, DD, sometime Fellow of Lincoln (1642)
- Robert Crosse, BD, Fellow of Lincoln (1648)
- Joshua Hoyle, DD, Master of University (1648)
- John Conant, DD, Rector of Exeter (1654)
- Robert Sanderson, DD, restored; afterwards Bishop of Lincoln (1660)
- William Creed, DD, sometime Fellow of St John's (1661)
- Richard Allestree, DD, Canon of Christ Church (1663)
- William Jane, DD, Canon of Christ Church (1680)
- John Potter, DD, Fellow of Lincoln; Bishop of Oxford; afterwards Archbishop of Canterbury (1707)
- George Rye, DD, sometime Fellow of Oriel; Archdeacon of Oxford (1737)
- John Fanshawe, DD, Student of Christ Church, and Regius Professor of Greek (1741)
- Edward Bentham, DD, Canon of Christ Church (1763)
- Benjamin Wheeler, DD, Fellow of Magdalen (1776)
- John Randolph, DD, Student of Christ Church, Professor of Poetry, and Regius Professor of Greek; Bishop of London; afterwards Bishop of Bangor, then of London (1783)
- Charles Henry Hall, DD, Canon of Christ Church; afterwards Dean (1807)
- William Howley, DD, Canon of Christ Church; afterwards Bishop of London, Archbishop of Canterbury (1809)
- William Van Mildert, DD, Queen's; afterwards Bishop of Llandaff and Dean of St Paul's, Bishop of Durham (1813)
- Frodsham Hodson, DD, Principal of Brasenose (1820)
- Charles Lloyd, Student of Christ Church; Bishop of Oxford (1822)
- Edward Burton, DD, Student of Christ Church (1829)
- Renn Dickson Hampden, DD, Principal of St Mary Hall; afterwards Bishop of Hereford (1836)
- William Jacobson, MA, Vice-Principal of Magdalen Hall and Public Orator, sometime Fellow of Exeter; DD, afterwards Bishop of Chester (1848)
- Robert Payne Smith, MA, Pembroke; DD; afterwards Dean of Canterbury (1865)
- James Bowling Mozley, BD, sometime Fellow of Magdalen; DD (1871)
- William Ince, MA, Fellow of Exeter; DD; Canon of Christ Church (1878)
- Henry Scott Holland, MA, Hon DLitt, sometime Student of Christ Church; DD; Canon of Christ Church (1911)
- Arthur Cayley Headlam, DD, sometime Fellow of All Souls; Canon of Christ Church (1918)
- Henry Leighton Goudge, DD, Canon of Christ Church (1923)
- Oliver Chase Quick, MA, Canon of Christ Church; afterwards DD (1939)
- Leonard Hodgson, DD, Canon of Christ Church (1944)
- Henry Chadwick, DD, Canon of Christ Church (MusB, DD Cantab; Hon DD Glas) (1959)
- Maurice Wiles, DD, Canon of Christ Church (BD, MA Cantab) (1970)
- Keith Ward, BLitt, MA, DD, Canon of Christ Church (BA Wales; MA Cantab; DD Oxon; DD Cantab; HonDD Glas) (1991)
- Marilyn McCord Adams, AB Illinois; PhD Cornell; ThM Princeton Theological Seminary; Canon of Christ Church (2004)
- Graham Ward Canon of Christ Church (MA, PhD Cantab) (2012–2024)
- Andrew Paul Davison, Canon of Christ Church (2024–present)

(Sources: Oxford Historical Register 1200-1900 and supplements; and the Oxford University Calendar)

- See also: Theology Faculty of the University of Oxford

== Professors at Cambridge ==
- Edward Wigan, alias Guy (1540)
- John Madew (c. 1545)
- Martin Bucer (1550)
  - In 1553 Archbishop Thomas Cranmer offered the Regius Chair to Philip Melanchthon, who declined the offer
- John Young (1555)
- Thomas Sedgwick (1557)
- James Pilkington (1559)
- Leonard Pilkington (1561)
- Matthew Hutton (1562)
- John Whitgift (1567)
- William Chaderton (1569)
- William Whitaker (1580)
- John Overall (1596)
- John Richardson (1607)
- Samuel Collins (1617)
- John Arrowsmith (1651)
- Anthony Tuckney (1656)
- Peter Gunning (1661)
- Joseph Beaumont (1674)
- Henry James (1700)
- Richard Bentley (1717)
- John Whalley (1742)
- John Green (?)
- Thomas Rutherforth (1745)
- Richard Watson (1771)
- John Kaye (1816)
- Thomas Turton (1827)
- Alfred Ollivant (1843)
- James Amiraux Jeremie (1850)
- Brooke Foss Westcott (1870)
- Henry Barclay Swete (1890)
- Vincent Henry Stanton (1916)
- Alexander Nairne (1922)
- Charles Earle Raven (1932)
- Arthur Michael Ramsey (1950)
- John Burnaby (1952)
- Edward Craddock Ratcliffe (1958)
- Dennis Eric Nineham (1964)
- Geoffrey Hugo Lampe (1971)
- Henry Chadwick (1979)
- Stephen Sykes (1985)
- David Frank Ford (1991)
- Ian Alexander McFarland (2015)
- David Fergusson (2021)

=== Official coat of arms ===
According to a grant of 1590, the office of Regius Professor of "Devinity" at Cambridge has a coat of arms with the following blazon:

Coat of arms of Regius Professor of Divinity
Crest On a wreath "silver and gules," a dove volant argent, with an olive-branch vert in his beak. Escutcheon Gules, on a cross ermine, between four doves argent, a book of the first, the leaves or, charged in the midst with the Greek letter θ (Theta) sable. Other elements Mantling - Gules, double argent.

== Professors at Dublin ==
The Regius Professor of Divinity at Trinity College Dublin was established in 1607 as the "Professor of Theological Controversies". The endowment was increased in 1674 by letters patent of Charles II. The title "Regius Professor" was specified in 1761 by letters patent of George III. The School of Divinity was founded in the late 18th century with the Regius Professor as its head. The School's link to the Church of Ireland was controversial after the Irish Church Act 1869 disestablished the church and the University of Dublin Tests Act 1873 allowed non-Anglican fellows. The debate became dormant after 1911 letters patent altered the School's governance. It reignited in the 1960s, after which vacancies in the School of Divinity went unfilled, including the Regius Professorship in 1982. The School of Divinity was replaced in 1978–81 by a non-denominational School of Hebrew, Biblical and Theological Studies (renamed the Department of Religions and Theology in 2004) although the statutes mandating a School and Regius Professor of Divinity remain unrepealed.

Professors were:

=== Professors of Divinity ===
- 1: 1591– (Luke Challoner)
- 2: 1607–21 James Ussher
- 3: 1621–23 (Samuel Ward)
- 4: 1623–48 Joshua Hoyle
- 5: 1662–70 Richard Lingard
- 6: 1670–78 Michael Ward
- 7: 1678–92 William Palliser
- 8: 1693–99 George Browne
- 9: 1699– Owen Lloyd
- 10: 1714– Richard Baldwin
- 11: 1722– Claudius Gilbert
- 12: 1743– Henry Clarke
- 13: 1746– John Pellisier
- 14: 1753– John Lawson
- 15: 1759– Brabazon Disney

=== Regius Professors of Divinity ===
- 15: 1761– Brabazon Disney
- 16: 1790–1819 James Drought
- 17: 1819–29 Richard Graves, D.D. Dean of Ardagh
- 18: 1829–50 Charles Richard Elrington
- 19: 1850–62 Joseph Henderson Singer
- 20: 1852–66 Samuel Butcher
- 21: 1866–88 George Salmon
- 22: 1888–1917 John Gwynn
- 23: 1917–30 Alan Hugh McNeile
- 24: 1930–35 Newport John Davis White
- 25: 1935–57 John Ernest Leonard Oulton
- 26: 1957–62 Richard Randall Hartford
- 27: 1964–82 Hugh Frederic Woodhouse

== See also ==
- Regius Professor
