= John Oulton =

Regius Professor of Divinity at Trinity College Dublin

John Ernest Leonard Oulton, D.D. (22 March 1886 – 2 February 1957) was Regius Professor of Divinity at Trinity College Dublin from 1935. until his death.

The son of The Rev. Richard Charles Oulton, BD, the incumbent of Glynn, he was educated at Campbell College and Trinity College Dublin. He won the Vice-Chancellor's Latin Medal in 1907; and the Berkeley Gold Medal in Greek in 1909. He was ordained in 1914. He served curacies at Harold's Cross and St Stephen's Church, Dublin; and incumbencies at Chapelizod and Monkstown, Dublin. He was Assistant Lecturer in Divinity at TCD from 1924 to 1930; Lecturer on the Bible from 1926 to 1929; and Archbishop King’s Professor of Divinity from 1930 to 1935
