= Arthur Noble =

Irish soldier

Lt. Col. Arthur Noble
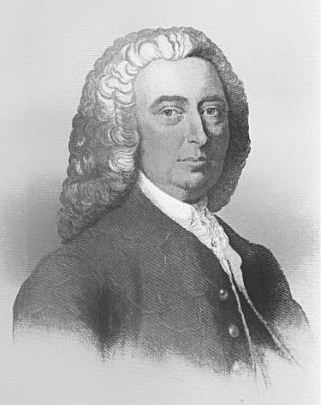
- Arthur Noble
- Born: 1695; Enniskillen, Ireland
- Died: February 11, 1747; Grand-Pré, Nova Scotia
- Military career
- Allegiance: British America
- Branch: Massachusetts Bay colonial militia
- Service years: c.1725—1747
- Rank: Lieutenant colonel commissioned Feb. 5, 1744
- Commands: Lt. Col. of Waldo's regiment; winter garrison at Grand-Pré, Nova Scotia
- Conflicts: King George's War; Siege of Louisbourg; Battle of Grand Pré †

Arthur Noble (c. 1695 – February 11, 1747) was a lieutenant colonel in the colonial militia of the British Province of Massachusetts Bay. He is best known for his role in military actions in Nova Scotia during King George's War (the North American theater of the War of the Austrian Succession). He was killed in the Battle of Grand Pré.

== Early life ==
He was born in Enniskillen, Ireland, and immigrated to Boston, Massachusetts, c. 1720 with the Lithgow family, being a close associate with Robert Lithgow. Both families entered the colonial militia and helped to ward off numerous attacks of French and Indians along the banks of Casco Bay and the Kennebec River during the War of the Austrian Succession and the conflicts that led to the French and Indian Wars. On December 14, 1725, Arthur Noble married Sarah Macklin.

== Louisbourg expedition ==
Noble was commissioned lieutenant-colonel of Col. Waldo's Regiment to be raised for the expedition to reduce the Fortress Louisbourg, one of the strongest forts in New France. Within fifty-six days, the New England provinces raised 4,300 men for the Louisburg Expedition. Waldo was made brigadier-general and gave about a fourth of his command in charge to Col. Noble. The fall of Louisburg on June 17, 1745, heightened the fears of the French that they might lose all of Canada.

== Battle of Grand Pré ==
In November 1746, Noble headed to Georgetown "being bound on an expedition against the enemies of the King of Great Britain,". He served at Fort Richmond (Maine). He made his last will, which was proved in the spring of 1747. In it, he named as heirs his brothers, Francis and James, his daughter, Sarah (Noble) Lithgow, and his son Arthur II. He left a large estate, his personal property having been valued at about £8,000.

After the fall of Louisbourg, this set the stage for the battle of Minas. The arrival of French troops in the Minas Basin at the top of the Bay of Fundy, and their subsequent establishment at Beaubassin, suggested to the Governor of Nova Scotia, Maj. Gen. Paul Mascarene, that the fortification of Grand-Pré was in danger. Thus, he petitioned Governor William Shirley of Massachusetts, for additional troops to be sent to Nova Scotia so that the French troops could be driven away and British authority could be affirmed. At Shirley's recommendation, it was resolved to send a reinforcement of five hundred troops, the units being divided into two divisions of 250 men. The first division was led by Captain Morris, who arrived on December 24, 1746. The second division, led by Noble, arrived a month later. The troops were then quartered among the people of Grand-Pré, stationed in twenty-four houses. They considered themselves perfectly secure during the severe months of winter, and did not take basic security precautions.

French intelligence reported the arrival of these New England reinforcements. Nicolas Antoine II Coulon de Villiers was assigned by de Ramezay to carry out a preemptive strike against Morris and Noble's men. The French Canadian force totaled six hundred troops, who were divided into ten divisions, each consisting of twenty-eight Canadians with an accompaniment of Indians. Coulon's own company had the strength of seventy-five men. The French army was about a mile and a half from their destination, when the attack was planned by Coulon, who knew precisely the New England troop's disposition.

At two in the morning, on February 11, 1747, the French army left their bivouac, advancing through snow that had been falling for thirty hours, so that in certain areas, it was four feet (over one meter) deep. A raging storm of unusual severity had taken the night. It was so stormy that many of the New Englander troops were convinced that attack was impossible, thus deterring an active watch. It was three o'clock in the morning when the French army reached assault position. Owing to the thick falling snow, they were unseen until close upon the New England sentries. Despite the storm, their Acadian guides were unerring in leading the French Canadian army to the houses where the New England troops were posted.

It was reported that some shots were initially fired to alarm the others. However, Coulon's assault was so swift, the doors of the houses they attacked were easily forced opened, surprising Noble's troops in their beds. Colonel Noble was killed early in the action, "fighting in his shirt", then mortally wounded by a musket ball to his forehead. Coulon was struck by a musket ball to his left arm leaving him faint from loss of blood. He was forced to retire his command to the chevalier de La Corne. He never recovered from that wound, and died from complications arising out of surgery to amputate that arm on April 3, 1750.

The men offered what resistance was possible, however, it was ineffective. At five in the morning the attack ceased. So complete was the French Canadian surprise attack that six officers, including all of the Noble brothers, were killed along with 70 of their men, 60 were wounded, and 54 taken prisoner. Of their enemy's casualties, only six Canadians were killed and fourteen wounded.

At early daylight, La Corne sent a flag of truce to ask the New Englanders for a surgeon to tend to one of their seriously wounded captains, since the French surgeon was absent with Coulon. This demand allowed hostages to be freed with hostilities being suspended until the surgeon's return. Thus, a truce was proposed at nine o'clock. The New Englanders were not prepared for the harsh winter conditions, not even having snow shoes. Therefore, it was impossible for them to advance. Even the French were greatly fatigued and attempted no offensive movement. According to William Kingsford, had the New England troops been accustomed to fight under such circumstances, and placed in the position to do so, the probability is that the French Canadians would have been exterminated. However, since the New England troops were powerless, unable to move a yard from the beaten path, the truce was accordingly accepted.

== Legacy ==
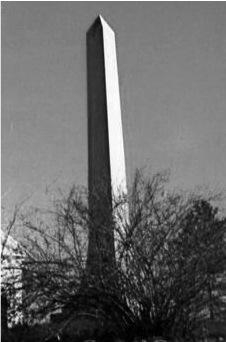
Arthur Noble Monument, Nobleboro, Maine

Both Arthur and his youngest brother, James, owned tracts of territory throughout the Walpole Settlement in the District of Maine, then just a small plantation of thirty able-bodied men. Arthur's son, Arthur II inherited most of the territories, and established part of the settlement as Nobleborough to commemorate his father and his uncles who died in the Louisbourg Expedition or at Grand Pré.

The American Irish Historical Society recognized the heroism of at least two Noble brothers: "Thus died two of the most heroic soldiers of Irish birth and extraction [Arthur and James Noble], who took part in the Louisburg expedition. Both died, like so many other distinguished Irishmen, on the field of honor, in the defense of the rights of their adopted country."

Arthur Noble was survived by three children:

- Sarah (b.1726), who married Hon. William Lithgow.
- Lt. James (b.1728), who died at eighteen from a severe fever.
- Arthur II (b.1737), who married Mary Goffe.
- namesake of Fort Noble, Phippsburg, Maine (1734 - unknown)

== Sources ==
- History and genealogy of the family of Thomas Noble, of Westfield. By Lucius Manlius Boltwood, 1878
- Volume 2 of The History of the State of Maine: From Its First Discovery, A. D. 1602, to the Separation, A. D. 1820. By William Durkee Williamson, 1839
- The history of Canada, Volume 3 By William Kingsford, 1889
- An account of the descendants of John Bridge, Cambridge, 1632 By William Frederick Bridge, 1884
- The Journal of the American Irish Historical Society, Vol. 19, 1920
- William Goold. Col. Arthur Noble, of Georgetown. Collections of the Maine Historical Society. 1877
- Col. Arthur Noble, of Georgetown. Fort Halifax. Col. William Vaughan ...By William Goold. 1881
