= Vincent Henry Stanton =

English academic (1846–1924)

Vincent Henry Stanton (1 June 1846 – 8 June 1924) was Regius Professor of Divinity at Cambridge University. He is buried in the Parish of the Ascension Burial Ground in Cambridge; he was a member of the Cambridge Apostles intellectual secret society. He organized the first of the Stanton lectures with Vernon Storr as the first lecturer in 1904
