= An Evening Walk =

1793 poem by William Wordsworth

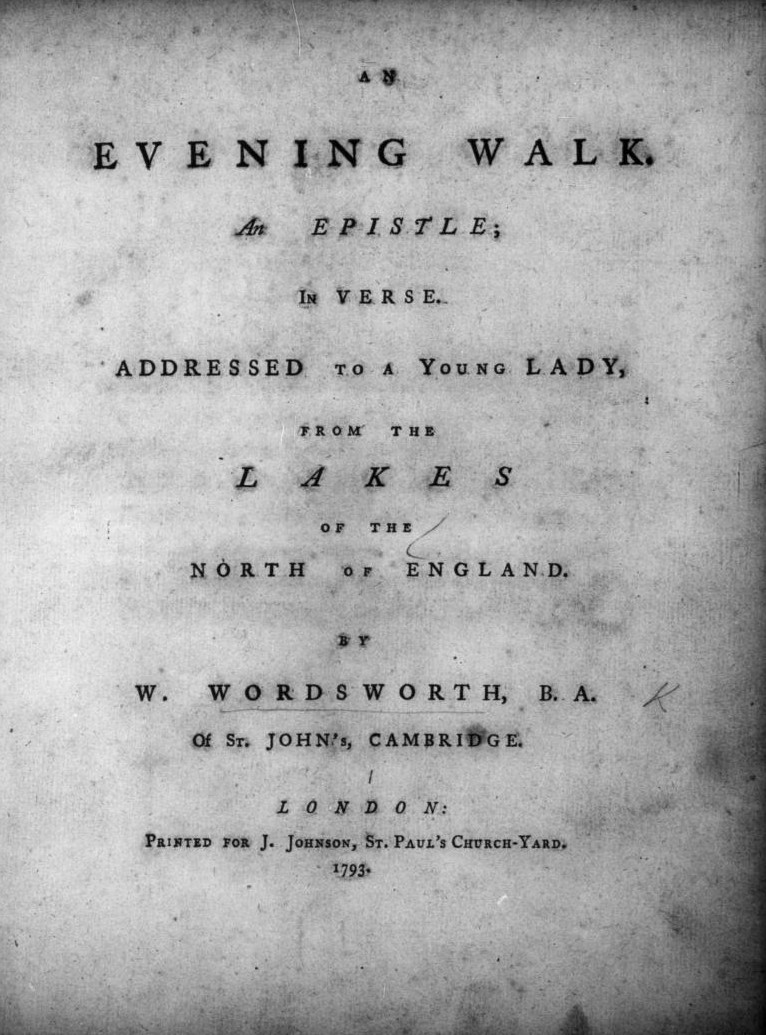

An Evening Walk (1793) is a topographical poem in heroic couplets written by William Wordsworth, originally while he was a student at Cambridge University, but several times revised by him in later years. It describes an imaginary walk through the Lake District, concentrating on the Hawkshead district. A very 18th-century poem in its genre, metre, inflated poetic diction, and frequent reference to earlier literature, it is not now considered one of Wordsworth's greatest works, but it is often rated highly among descriptive poems of its century and has been cited as an early proof of the poet's keen observation of nature.

== Composition ==
Many years after the event, Wordsworth claimed that An Evening Walk "was composed at school, and during my two first College vacations", but not all of this statement can be taken at face value: he may have drawn on his schoolboy composition "The Vale of Esthwaite" for the Evening Walk's subject matter and some of its imagery, but he only began to write the poem in his summer vacation from Cambridge University in 1788. He brought it to a conclusion before he left Cambridge in 1791, and continued to revise it on and off for the next two years.

== Publication ==
On 29 January 1793 the poem was published as a small two-shilling quarto in London by Joseph Johnson under the title An Evening Walk. An Epistle, in Verse. Addressed to a Young Lady, from the Lakes of the North of England, the young lady in question being Wordsworth's sister Dorothy. Johnson also published Wordsworth's Descriptive Sketches on the same day. Wordsworth soon regretted having, as he said, "huddled up those two little works and sent them into the world in so imperfect a state". In April 1794 he made considerable revisions and additions to the Evening Walk, almost doubling its length from 446 lines to 803, but he never published this version. Many years later, however, in 1815, he republished extracts from the poem, and still later revised it for each of its successive appearances in 1820, 1827, 1832, 1836, and 1840. His final version, dating from 1845, is now the one commonly reprinted.

== Themes and technique ==
An Evening Walk is an example of a poetic form most associated with the 18th century, the topographical, local or loco-descriptive poem, described by Dr Johnson as poetry of which "the fundamental object is some particular landscape...with the addition of...historical retrospection or incidental meditation". Wordsworth presents a description of an imaginary walk through the Lake District starting at Cockermouth and following the upper reaches of the River Derwent to the Borrowdale fells, and from there past the lakes of Grasmere, Rydal Water, Windermere and Esthwaite Water, concentrating especially on the district around Hawkshead. The poem pictures not just the landscape but also the daily life of the people who live there, and reflects on the dangers as well as the aesthetic attractions of the passing scene, as well as issues more personal to Wordsworth himself. As Stephen Gill has written, the poem's "[m]elancholy reflection on past and present, the lament for past joys, the mind accordant to the promptings of Nature, the address to an absent loved one", namely Wordsworth's sister Dorothy, are all common themes of English poetry before the Romantic Revolution. An Evening Walk is 18th century also in its metre, heroic couplets, and its rhetorical technique, which relies heavily on poetic inversion, personification, periphrasis, apostrophe, ellipsis, artificial grammar and those excesses of "poetic diction" which Wordsworth was later to abominate.

== Sources ==
An Evening Walk also reflects the common literary practice of its day in its free use of borrowings from previous poetry, sometimes acknowledged by the use of quotation marks but more often not. Indeed, An Evening Walk has been called "almost an anthology of borrowings and adaptations from the landscape-poets". The standard critical edition of the poem identifies 33 quotations and allusions from earlier writers, English and French. Most of them are from Milton (especially his Lycidas, Comus and Areopagitica) and from 18th-century English poems, many of which he had found used as examples in John Scott of Amwell's Critical Essays on Some of the Poems of Several English Poets. Other major sources were Thomas Gray's Journal in the Lakes and Thomas West's A Guide to the Lakes. The most important influence on An Evening Walk, however, comes from Wordsworth's own early poem "The Vale of Esthwaite" and his student translations from Virgil's Georgics.

== Reception ==
The publisher Joseph Johnson left the book to make its own way unaided by him, and in consequence few copies were sold, but Wordsworth's brother Christopher later recalled that it caused some stir in Cambridge, Derby and Exeter literary groups. One of the Cambridge readers, Samuel Taylor Coleridge, was so enthused as to arrange a meeting with Wordsworth, beginning a long and fruitful friendship. Dorothy and Christopher Wordsworth drew up for their brother's benefit a criticism of the poem, no longer extant. Dorothy elsewhere mixed praise and censure in a letter to a friend, picking out for reprehension the poem's "Obscurity, and a too frequent use of some particular expressions and uncommon words".

Contemporary critics were on the whole reasonably friendly. The Analytical Review, also published by Johnson, liked the poem's "distinct and circumstantial views of nature, both inanimate and animate, which discover the eye of a diligent observer, and the hand of an able copyist of nature". The Critical Review praised "that merit which a poetical tale most values, new and picturesque imagery...which would not disgrace our best descriptive poets". The European Magazine conceded that "Mr Wordsworth's paintings...do not want force or effect, and read on the spot, we are convinced would receive additional advantages from the minuteness and accuracy of his pencil", but wondered how much value the genre of topographical poetry had. Thomas Holcroft, writing on An Evening Walk and Descriptive Sketches in the Monthly Review, agreed with the latter point. "More descriptive poetry! Have we not enough! Must eternal changes be rung on uplands and lowlands, and nodding forests, and brooding clouds, and cells, and dells, and dingles?" Nor did he sympathise with the poet's meditations: "How often shall we in vain advise those, who are so delighted with their own thoughts that they cannot forbear from putting them into rhyme, to examine those thoughts until they understand them?" Even he, however, admitted that "There are passages in [both] poems which display imagination, and which afford hope for the future". The most laudatory notice came in the Gentleman's Magazine from a writer who, claiming acquaintanceship with Wordsworth, compared him with Thomas Gray and William Mason. A few years later, reviewing Lyrical Ballads, Francis Wrangham in the British Critic recalled that An Evening Walk had displayed "the fire and fancy of a true poet, though obscured by diction often and intentionally inflated".

Both An Evening Walk and Descriptive Sketches are often classified by modern critics as, in James Averill's words, "eighteenth-century excrescences" belonging to a genre no longer fashionable, but such judgements can come with important qualifications. Kenneth R. Johnston, for example, found it "nearly unreadable" by reason of its outmoded poetic diction, but he went on to call it "a creditable piece of description and meditation in the mode of Sensibility." Stephen Gill considered that though it has none of the greatness of Lyrical Ballads and Poems, in Two Volumes it is "one of the best examples of the loco-descriptive poem". Wordsworth's biographer Juliet Barker thought most of the poem "both feebly and imperfectly expressed, but it did fulfil William's declared intention of describing the 'infinite variety of natural appearances'." Robert Arnold Aubin, seconded by James Averill, believed it showed that "Even at the outset of his career Wordsworth was the greatest topographical poet since Dyer." Averill, while conceding that "One would not care to make lavish claims", yet asserted that "Wordsworth's eye for the particulars of nature was never better than in this poem...it is a poem to be read at Hawkshead, Grasmere, or Borrowdale, or when one wishes to be carried to the forests, mountains, and lakes of the region Wordsworth loved and helped make famous."

== Reference critical edition ==
- Averill, James, ed. (1984). An Evening Walk. Cornell University Press: Ithaca, NY. ISBN 0801414741.
