= Shallet Turner =

English educator (c. 1692 – 1762)

Shallet Turner FRS LL. D. (ca. 1692 – 13 November 1762) was a Fellow of Peterhouse, Cambridge, and a Fellow of the Royal Society. As a Regius Professor of Modern History, he was notorious for treating the position as a sinecure.

== Life ==
Turner was baptised on 27 September 1692, the son of John Turner of Tynemouth, Northumberland, and received his early education in Houghton-le-Spring. In 1710, at the age of seventeen, he matriculated at Peterhouse as a pensioner, but later the same year he became a Cosin Scholar. He went on to graduate BA in 1713/14 and was elected a fellow of Peterhouse in 1715. He proceeded MA in 1717 and graduated Doctor of Laws in 1728, also being promoted to Junior Dean of his college. He had a particular interest in Mathematics.

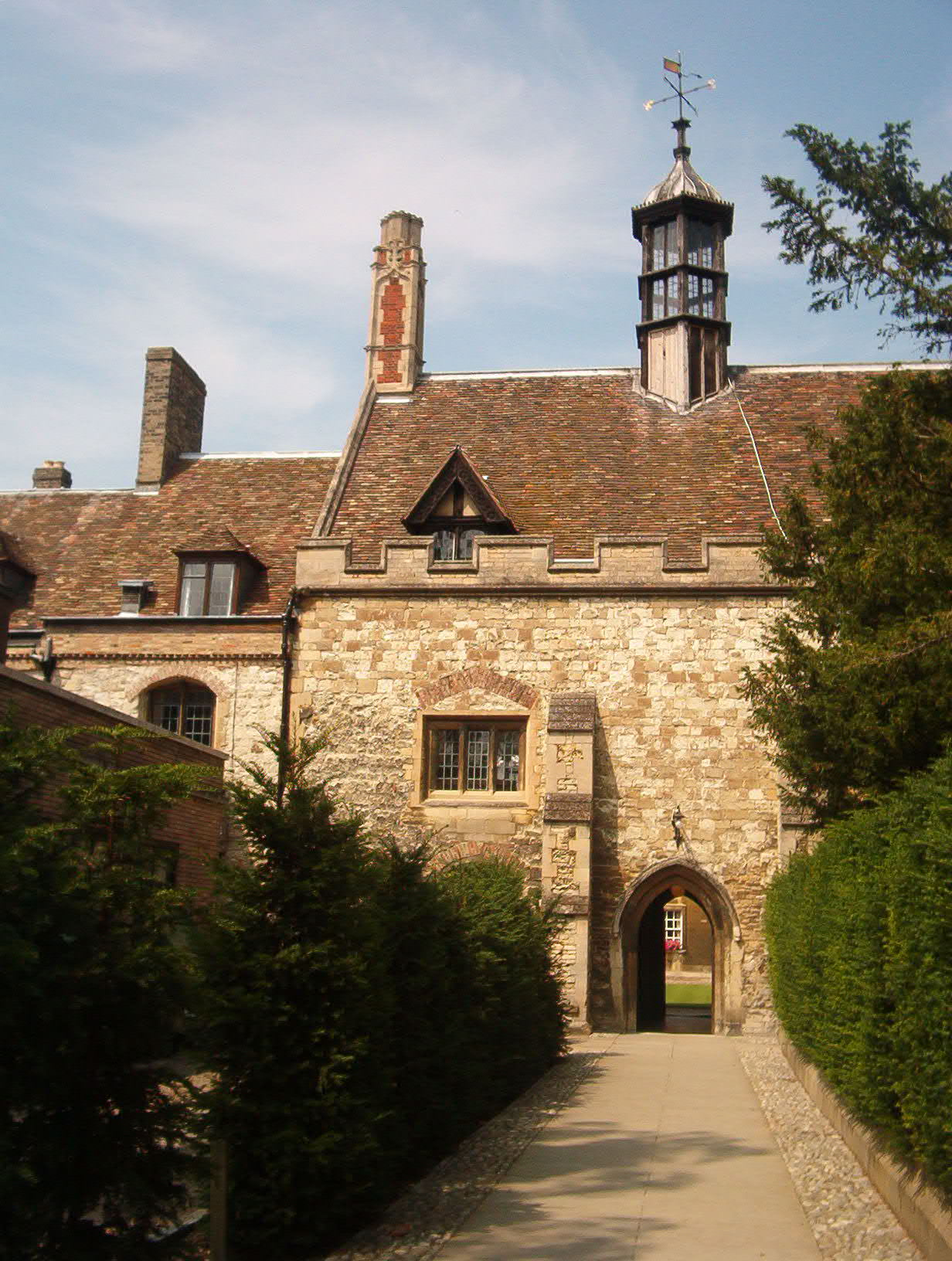
The Hall of Peterhouse, little changed since the time of Turner

In 1724, King George I established Regius Professorships in Modern History and Modern Languages at both Oxford and Cambridge. Those to be appointed, at a salary of £400 a year, were to be "persons of sober conversation and prudent conduct... skilled in modern history and in the knowledge of modern languages". In reality, the position was a sinecure in the gift of the King. In 1735, not long after the death of Samuel Harris, the first of the new regius professors at Cambridge, Turner was appointed to succeed him. The History of the University of Cambridge says of the appointment that Turner had "no qualifications whatever apart from his being a fellow of Peterhouse".

Shortly after Turner's appointment as regius professor, a government clerk asked him for information on his work. Turner replied that it was more than seven years since a list of King's Scholars had been made, that all such places were currently vacant, and that the documents and nomination forms could be found in the office of the Secretary of State. In response to this, no action was taken. At the end of the Summer Term of 1737, Thomas Gray wrote with heavy irony to Horace Walpole –

Not to tire you with my travels, you must know that Mr. Turner is come down. His list is vastly near being full notwithstanding which, and the cares and duties of his office, he says he thinks to go to Paris every year.

Turner continued as regius professor from 1735 until 1762. A historian of the University reports that "Turner held the professorship for seven and twenty years and did absolutely nothing."

The antiquary William Cole (1714–1782) wrote of Turner –

He never resided in the University, but only occasionally with Dr Smith at Trinity College Lodge, being a great acquaintance. As to reading lectures he never thought it incumbent upon him to do so: but allowed some small pittance to the French and Italian teachers in the University. I have often heard my old Italian master, Signor Piazza, complain of him for the exility of his exhibition to him.

On 26 March 1741, Turner was elected a Fellow of the Royal Society.

In 1748, Turner was a subscriber to Colin Maclaurin's Account of Sir Isaac Newton's philosophical discoveries. In 1748, Turner resigned his fellowship of Peterhouse, and in 1749 Thomas Gooch, as Bishop of Ely, filled the vacancy by appointing one Edward Osborne.

An anonymous pamphlet appeared in 1751 which complained of various abuses at the University and said of Turner that "If the Professor of Modern History and Modern Languages was to reside with proper assistants in the University, it is not to be doubted but that a numerous audience would regularly attend a course of lectures so useful and entertaining". However, neither the king nor the government was inclined to take any action, so such criticisms had no effect whatever.

In 1750, Turner was noted as a new subscriber to Archibald Bower's The History of the Popes (1748–1766). In 1759, he was a subscriber to a new translation of The Tragedies of Sophocles by Thomas Francklin, the University's Regius Professor of Greek.

Sir Edmund Gosse, in his biography of Thomas Gray, notes that the post held by Turner came to be seen as a complete sinecure. In 1762, when Turner had been dead two weeks, Gray's friends lobbied to secure the regius chair in modern history for Gray, as "It was not expected that any lectures should be given; as a matter of fact not one lecture was delivered until after Gray's death". In the event, Gray lost out to Lawrence Brockett, but he later secured the position after Brockett's death in a fall from his horse in 1768.

Turner's Will was proved in the Prerogative Court of Canterbury.

In his edition of Smyth's The Lessons of History (1955), Wallace Brockway says dismissively of Turner –

Of Shallet Turner, regius professor for more than a quarter of a century, good or ill fame says nothing: he is a footnote, and an uninteresting one.
