= Guide to the Lakes =

1810 guidebook

A Guide through the District of the Lakes
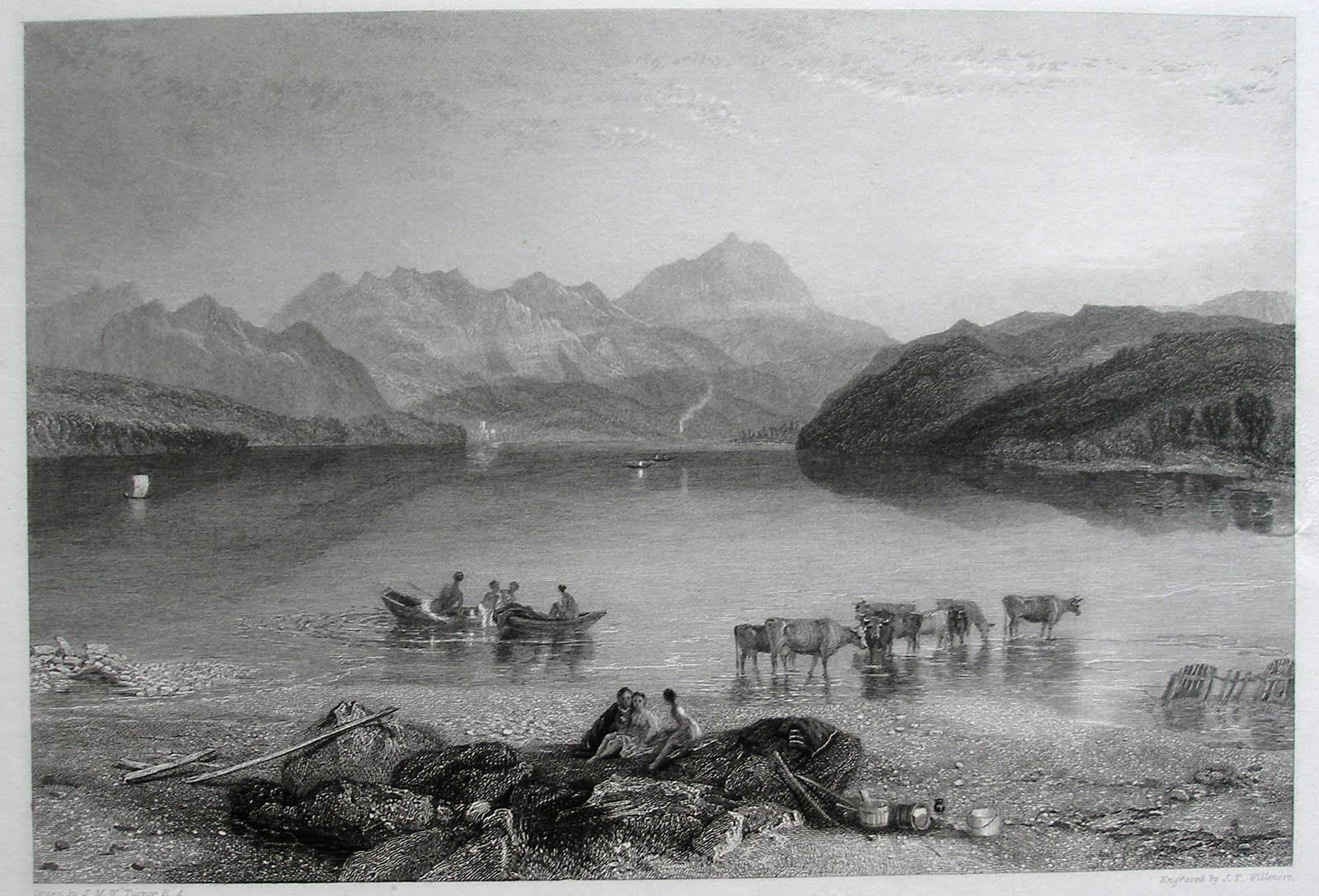
- Many important figures in the Romantic movement were influenced by William Wordsworth's praise of the Lake District. J.M.W. Turner's 1835 painting of Ullswater was rendered into this line engraving for publication in a book of scenic views.
- Subject: Lake District, Romanticism
- Genre: Travel
- Publication date: 1810, 1835
- Publication place: England

Guide to the Lakes, more fully A Guide through the District of the Lakes, William Wordsworth's travellers' guidebook to England's Lake District, has been studied by scholars both for its relationship to his Romantic poetry and as an early influence on 19th-century geography. Originally written because Wordsworth needed money, the first version was published in 1810 as anonymous text in a collection of engravings. The work is now best known from its expanded and updated 1835 fifth edition.

According to Wordsworth biographer Stephen Gill,

The Guide is multi-faceted. It is a guide, but it is also a prose-poem about light, shapes, and textures, about movement and stillness ... It is a paean to a way of life, but also a lament for the inevitability of its passing ... What holds this diversity together is the voice of complete authority, compounded from experience, intense observation, thought, and love.

== Relation to Wordsworth's life and thought ==
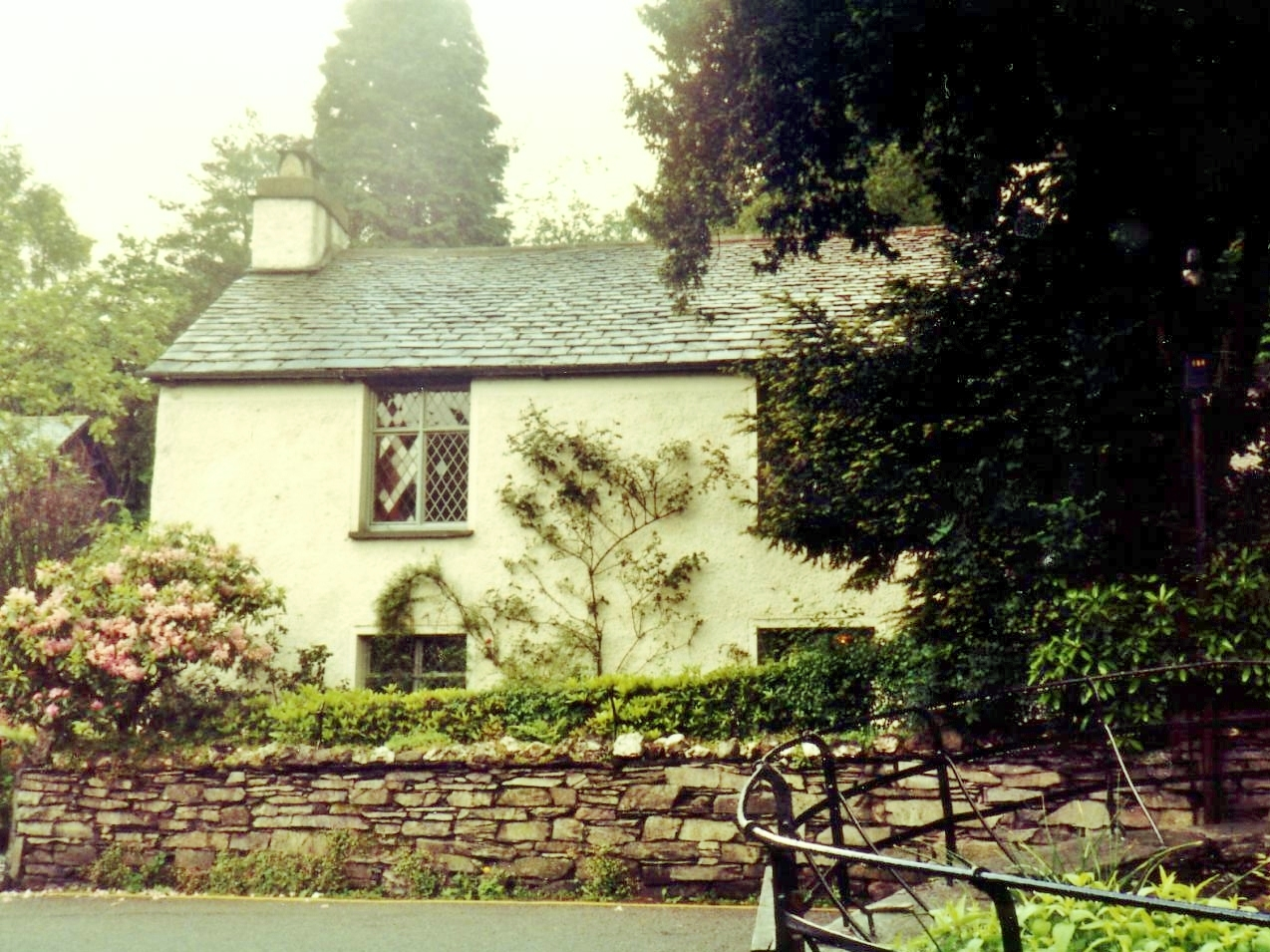
Dove Cottage, Wordsworth's home near Grasmere in the Lake District

Wordsworth was born in the Lake District and spent much of his life living there. Wordsworth and his friends Robert Southey and Samuel Taylor Coleridge became known as Lake Poets not only because they lived in this area but also because its landscapes and people inspired their work.

By 1810, Wordsworth was living at Allan Bank near Grasmere with his sister and collaborator Dorothy Wordsworth, his sister-in-law, his wife, and their four small children. A fifth child was born to them in 1810. Several commentators have suggested that Wordsworth agreed to write text for a new book of engravings because he needed money, a suggestion supported by Wordsworth's scathing description of the engravings in an 1810 letter to Lady Beaumont: "The drawings, or etchings, or whatever they may be called are ... intolerable. You will receive from them that sort of disgust which I do from bad poetry ... They will please many who in all the arts are most taken by what is worthless."

== Publishing history ==
The beauty of the Lake District was already well known in 1810, the year Wordsworth's Guide to the Lakes was first published, as an anonymous introduction to a book of engravings of the Lake District by the Reverend Joseph Wilkinson. For example, in 1775 the poet Thomas Gray published a journal of his visit to the area, describing the vale of Grasmere as "an unsuspected paradise." The first Lakeland visitors' guide (as opposed to a traveller's journal) appeared in 1778, when Thomas West published a route for travellers that included advice on viewing the landscape.

Wordsworth explained his goal to a reader in May 1810, saying, "What I wished to accomplish was to give a model of the manner in which topographical descriptions ought to be executed, in order to their being either useful or intelligible, by evolving truly and distinctly one appearance from another."

In 1820, Wordsworth published a second, longer version of the Guide attached to a book of sonnets he had written about the River Duddon. He explained his reasoning as follows:

This Essay, which was published several years ago as an Introduction to some Views of the Lakes, by the Rev. Joseph Wilkinson, (an expensive work, and necessarily of limited circulation,) is now, with emendations and additions, attached to these volumes; from a consciousness of its having been written in the same spirit which dictated several of the poems, and from a belief that it will tend materially to illustrate them. (page 214)

In 1822, Wordsworth's text was first published as a separate volume. Fourth and fifth revised editions followed in 1823 and 1835; the last of these is generally considered definitive.

Modern editions are based on the expanded fifth edition, published in 1835.

== Organization ==
=== Directions and information for the tourist ===
Wordsworth begins this section as follows:

In preparing this Manual, it was the Author's principal wish to furnish a Guide or Companion for the Minds of Persons of taste, and feeling for Landscape, who might be inclined to explore the District of the Lakes with that degree of attention to which its beauty may fairly lay claim. For the more sure attainment, however, of this primary object, he will begin by undertaking the humble and tedious task of supplying the Tourist with directions how to approach the several scenes in their best, or most convenient, order.

Wordsworth's emphasis on the word "Minds" reflects "his constant interest in subject-object interactions," evident throughout the book and in his poetry in general.

=== Description of the scenery of the Lakes ===
What the Norton Anthology calls Wordsworth's "Lake District chauvinism" is evident in his comparisons of its lakes and mountains to those of Scotland, Wales, and Switzerland. He finds much to praise even in the region's climate, which is marked by changeability, with frequent clouds, rain, or even gales:

Such clouds, cleaving to their stations, or lifting up suddenly their glittering heads from behind rocky barriers, or hurrying out of sight with speed of the sharpest edge, will often tempt an inhabitant to congratulate himself on belonging to a country of mists and clouds and storms, and make him think of the blank sky of Egypt, and of the cerulean vacancy of Italy, as an unanimated and even a sad spectacle. (page 58)

=== Miscellaneous observations ===
Wordsworth begins by discussing the relative advantages of different seasons for a visit to the Lakes.

Next he embarks on a long comparison of Lake District scenery to the much-praised landscapes of Switzerland, although with this initial disclaimer (page 98):

Nothing is more injurious to genuine feeling than the practice of hastily and ungraciously deprecating the face of one country by comparing it with that of another ... fastidiousness is a wretched travelling companion; and the best guide to which in matters of taste we can entrust ourselves, is a disposition to be pleased.

=== Scawfell Pike ===
The description of an ascent of Scawfell Pike (now Scafell Pike) is copied from a letter written by Dorothy Wordsworth describing her visit to this mountain in 1818. William ambiguously credits this to a "letter to a friend". This same account was copied by Harriet Martineau (with attribution to William Wordsworth) in her widely used guide book of 1855, which was in its 4th edition by 1876 – thereby ensuring a wide circulation of this account for much of the 19th century.

=== Excursions ===
Here Wordsworth describes several itineraries a traveller might choose leading to some of the Lake District's finest views. He includes in this section a long passage transcribed nearly intact from the 1805 journal of his sister Dorothy Wordsworth about a trip they took from their home in Grasmere to Ullswater (see Sélincourt footnote pp. 181–182).

=== Ode ("The pass of Kirkstone") ===
Throughout this Guide, Wordsworth includes poems (by himself and by others) expanding on topics being discussed in prose. This section of the guidebook is an ode in rhyming verse by Wordsworth evoking the hard ascent and joyful descent of Kirkstone Pass, a high mountain pass between Ambleside and Patterdale.

=== Itinerary ===
This section of the book contains mileages measured between various Lake District destinations. According to the fifth edition text (page 123), "The Publishers, with the permission of the Author, have added the following Itinerary of the Lakes for the Benefit of the Tourist." Hence the last part of the Guide that was written by Wordsworth was his ode concerning the pass of Kirkstone.
