= Journal in the Lakes =

Work by Thomas Gray

The English poet Thomas Gray's Journal in the Lakes, written in 1769 and first published posthumously in 1775, is his account of a tour of the Lake District, northern Lancashire and the West Riding of Yorkshire. Written in the form of a journal and sent to a friend in a series of letters, it was not intended for publication. The Lake District was at that time little visited, but Gray's Journal, the first detailed description of a trip to the Lakes, played the leading part in turning it into a popular tourist destination. Its editor, William Roberts, called it "a more original and influential work than [Gray's] better known Elegy, and it is considered one of Gray's finest prose works and an early classic of travel literature.

== Context ==
Mountainous country was, up to the 18th century, considered sterile, savage, frightening, and unpleasant to visit and to view. Celia Fiennes, having visited the Lake District, wrote in 1698 of "those inaccessible high rocky barren hills which hangs [sic] over ones head in some places and appear very terrible". Daniel Defoe, in the next generation, described Westmorland as "a country eminent only for being the wildest, most barren and frightful of any that I have passed over in England, or even in Wales it self." In the middle of the 18th century, however, a revolution in taste, led among others by Jean-Jacques Rousseau and Edmund Burke, introduced into the aesthetic appreciation of landscape the concept of the Sublime, held to be eminently apparent in mountainous country. Early stirrings of interest in the beauty of Lake District scenery are apparent in various articles by George Smith in the 1740s and 1750s, John Dalton's Poem Addressed to Two Ladies (1755), and John Brown's A Description of the Lake at Keswick (1766). This last work was probably read by Gray, and may well have motivated him to follow in Brown's footsteps.

== Journey ==
Gray paid his first visit to the Lake District in 1767 accompanied by his friend Thomas Wharton, but rainy weather and a sharp attack of Wharton's asthma induced them to call the holiday short. In 1769 they set out on a second Lakes tour, leaving Wharton's home, Old Park, near Durham, on 29 September. However, that same night Wharton suffered another violent attack of asthma at the village of Brough in Westmorland, which again forced him to abandon the journey. The next day Gray continued on alone, having promised Wharton to send him an account of the holiday, and travelled from Brough through Appleby to Penrith. The next day, 1 October, he visited Ullswater and climbed Dunmallet before returning to Penrith. On 2 October he travelled past Blencathra and Skiddaw to Keswick, set in what he described as "the Vale of Elysium", and explored the neighbourhood on foot. He based himself in Keswick for the next five days. On the first he walked to Lodore Falls and the lower reaches of Borrowdale, on the second to Crow Park, on the third to Portinscale and the Castlerigg stone circle, on the fourth to Bassenthwaite Lake, and on the last he revisited Crow Park and a stretch of the Penrith road. On 8 October he left Keswick and passed through Grasmere on his way to Ambleside, but, failing to find suitable accommodation there, went still further to Kendal. The following day he explored the parish church and Sizergh Castle, then on 10 October, leaving the Lakes behind him, he made his way from Kendal to Lancaster, where he examined the castle. He spent 11 October in the fishing village of Poulton-le-Sands on Morecambe Bay, then left Lancaster on the 12th and proceeded on to upper Ribblesdale in Yorkshire via Hornby and Ingleton. Establishing himself in Settle gave him the opportunity to spend a day visiting Malham and Gordale Scar, and the next day, 14 October, he pushed on to Skipton and Otley. A look at Leeds, which he found smoky and ugly, marked the effective end of the holiday, and he did not trouble to record his further journey home to Cambridge by way of Aston near Sheffield (where he rested for some days at the home of his friend the poet and Anglican priest William Mason), Nottingham, Leicester, and Huntingdon.

Gray was, at the time of this journey, a middle-aged and somewhat delicate man. He voiced a disinclination to walk on steep or wet ground, and avoided the rougher parts of the Lake District. One local who acted as Gray's guide for part of his holiday is reported to have remembered him as "difficult to be pleased, and peevish from ill-health", yet Gray's own journal shows that his mood was quite as sunny as the weather he enjoyed and – despite the scholar George Whalley's description of him as "almost immobile" – that he was fit enough at any rate to walk twelve or thirteen miles a day.

== Composition and manuscripts ==
Gray composed his journal in three notebooks as the holiday progressed. Only the second and third of these have survived, the second beginning halfway through the entry for 9 October. Gray transcribed these notebooks into letters which he sent, as promised, to Wharton. The first of these, sent on 18 October from Aston, covered only the first one-and-a-half days after the friends had parted, 30 September and part of 1 October. The next three letters, sent from Cambridge over the next few weeks, took the narrative up to halfway through 8 October. For the final instalment, covering well-nigh half the holiday, Wharton had to wait for a transcript from the notebooks made by William Mason's curate Christopher Alderson and sent on 24 July 1770 by Mason. It is not known why Gray did not send it himself. The letters, including Alderson's transcript, now form British Library Egerton MS. 2400, and the notebooks were as of 2001 still in private hands.

== Purpose and themes ==
Gray never intended the journal for publication; rather, he wrote it as a personal favour for his friend Thomas Wharton to let him know how the holiday had turned out and perhaps to serve as a guide should Wharton ever make the journey himself. He exhibits in it the interest in English rural life which informs his early poems; in birds, buildings, and country labourers. He also shows that his interests are turning to a more scientific observation of nature, though the journal does not contain the same minute botanical detail with which many of his later letters are filled. Landscapes he describes with a true sense of composition, perhaps helped thereto by the Claude glass he carried with him, an optical device intended to present a broad landscape in a small compass. Mason, in his edition of the journal, wrote that "When Mr Gray described places he aimed only to be exact, clear, and intelligible...to paint by the eye, not the fancy", but this is not always true: he brought to his descriptions of cliffs and mountains a pleasurably Gothic sense of intimidation and horror, as in his much-quoted account of walking beneath Gowder Crags in Borrowdale, the topmost rocks "hanging loose and nodding forwards, [which] seem just starting from their base in shivers." Gray was reminded of his youthful experience of travelling, fearful of avalanches, over Alpine passes, and "hastened on in silence."

== Publication ==
Gray died on 31 July 1771, less than two years after his journey, never having published the journal. In 1775 William Mason produced an edition of Gray's poems, and included the journal in a version marred, after his usual manner, by many editorial omissions, additions and transpositions; he also provided an introductory paragraph and substantial commentary footnotes. Mason's edition reached a wider public when Thomas West included it in his A Guide to the Lakes (1778), the most popular tourist guide to the Lakes of its time, going through 10 editions in the next 35 years.

== Influence ==
Within a very few years of the Journal's publication the Lake District had become one of the most popular destinations for tourists in search of the picturesque, and for this Gray has been credited as a major cause, or even as the leading cause. Edmund Gosse wrote that "In his youth [Gray] was the man who first looked on the sublimities of Alpine scenery with pleasure, and in old age he was to be the pioneer of Wordsworth in opening the eyes of Englishmen to the exquisite scenery of Cumberland." Indeed, Wordsworth was indebted to Gray's Journal for much of the final passage in his early poem An Evening Walk, and in his later Guide to the Lakes he paid tribute to the "distinctness and unaffected simplicity" of Gray's descriptions, saying they had "excited that pensive interest with which the human mind is ever disposed to listen to the farewell words of a man of genius."

== Evaluation ==
The Journal's 21st-century editor, William Roberts, has called it "a gem – one of the finest pieces of travel writing in English – and one of the earliest"; he believes that "a look at the landscape through earlier eyes [than Wordsworth's], especially through Gray's eyes, may challenge us all into questioning and developing our own reactions to wild scenery." Gray's biographers also have high praise for it. Arthur Lytton Sells judged the Journal to be Gray's best prose work. R. W. Ketton-Cremer believed that it contains some of his finest descriptive writing: "Page after page the exquisite pictures unfold, sunlight on the mountains, lakesides at evening or in the morning mist, passing impressions of cloud or verdure, landscapes of fresh and limpid beauty." Many passages of the Journal, wrote Robert L. Mack, combine "a careful, responsible, and authentically precise description of the natural world, on the one hand, with an ability at the same time accurately and unaffectedly to gauge the transformative power of that landscape on the individual human imagination." With this "peculiar combination of candid authenticity...and raw, imaginative power [it] stands as a testament to the modern reader that he too, at least, could nurture the spirit of religious awe in which even the poets of the eighteenth century from time to time walked with nature."

== Modern editions ==
- Toynbee, Paget; Whibley, Leonard, eds. (1935). Correspondence of Thomas Gray. Volume 3: 1766–1771. Oxford: Clarendon Press.

- Toynbee, Paget; Whibley, Leonard; Starr, H. W., eds. (1971). Correspondence of Thomas Gray. Volume 3: 1766–1771 (Revised ed.). Oxford: Clarendon Press. ISBN 0191861642.

- Roberts, William, ed. (2001). Thomas Gray's Journal of His Visit to the Lake District in October 1769. Liverpool: Liverpool University Press. ISBN 0853236674.

- Roberts, Bill, ed. (2012). Thomas Gray's Journal of His Visit to the Lake District in October 1769: Also Including a Letter Describing His Visit to the Highlands of Scotland in September 1765 (Revised ed.). Kirkoswald, Cumbria: Northern Academic Press. ISBN 9780952810322.
