= Regius Professor of History =

Regius Professor of History may refer to:

- Regius Professor of History (Oxford), England, previously Regius Professor of Modern History
- Regius Professor of History (Cambridge), England, previously Regius Professor of Modern History
- Regius Professor of Ecclesiastical History (Oxford)
- Regius Professor of Natural History (Aberdeen)

== See also ==
- Regius Professor
