= Lawrence Brockett =

English academic

Lawrence Brockett (13 August 1724 – 12 July 1768) was an English academic.

The youngest of five sons born to Lawrence Brockett and Anne Clarke, Lawrence inherited from his parents Headlam Hall, a country house near Gainford, County Durham. The house was originally built by Henry Birkbeck, Lawrence’s maternal great great grandfather.

Brockett matriculated at Trinity College, Cambridge in 1743 from Scorton Grammar School, graduating BA in 1747 and becoming a fellow of Trinity in 1749. Brockett was tutor to James Lowther (1736–1802), 1st Earl of Lonsdale. Lowther later married the daughter of John Stuart, 3rd Earl of Bute. Stuart had been tutor to King George III, and was from May 1762 to April 1763 his first appointment as prime minister.

On the death of Shallet Turner in 1762, the King preferred Brockett over Thomas Gray for the post of Regius Professor of Modern History at Cambridge University, a sinecure. Gray succeeded Brockett in this position after the latter's death.

Brockett died on 12 July 1768 after a riding accident while returning from Hinchingbrooke, near Huntingdon, to Cambridge. He was buried according to tradition at Gainford by torchlight, probably the church's last nocturnal burial. An ancient foliated cross in the porch of Gainford church, Co. Durham, is superinscribed as memorial to Lawrence Brockett, MA, BD of Trinity College, Cambridge.

"Professor Brockett was the last person who was buried, according to the custom of the family, by night and with torchlight. There are several persons now living who retain a vivid recollection of the awful solemnity of the scene as the procession moved slowly on with its line of torches down the long and shady lane from Headlam to the last resting-place of the dead."
