= Leonard Whibley =

English classical scholar (1864–1941)

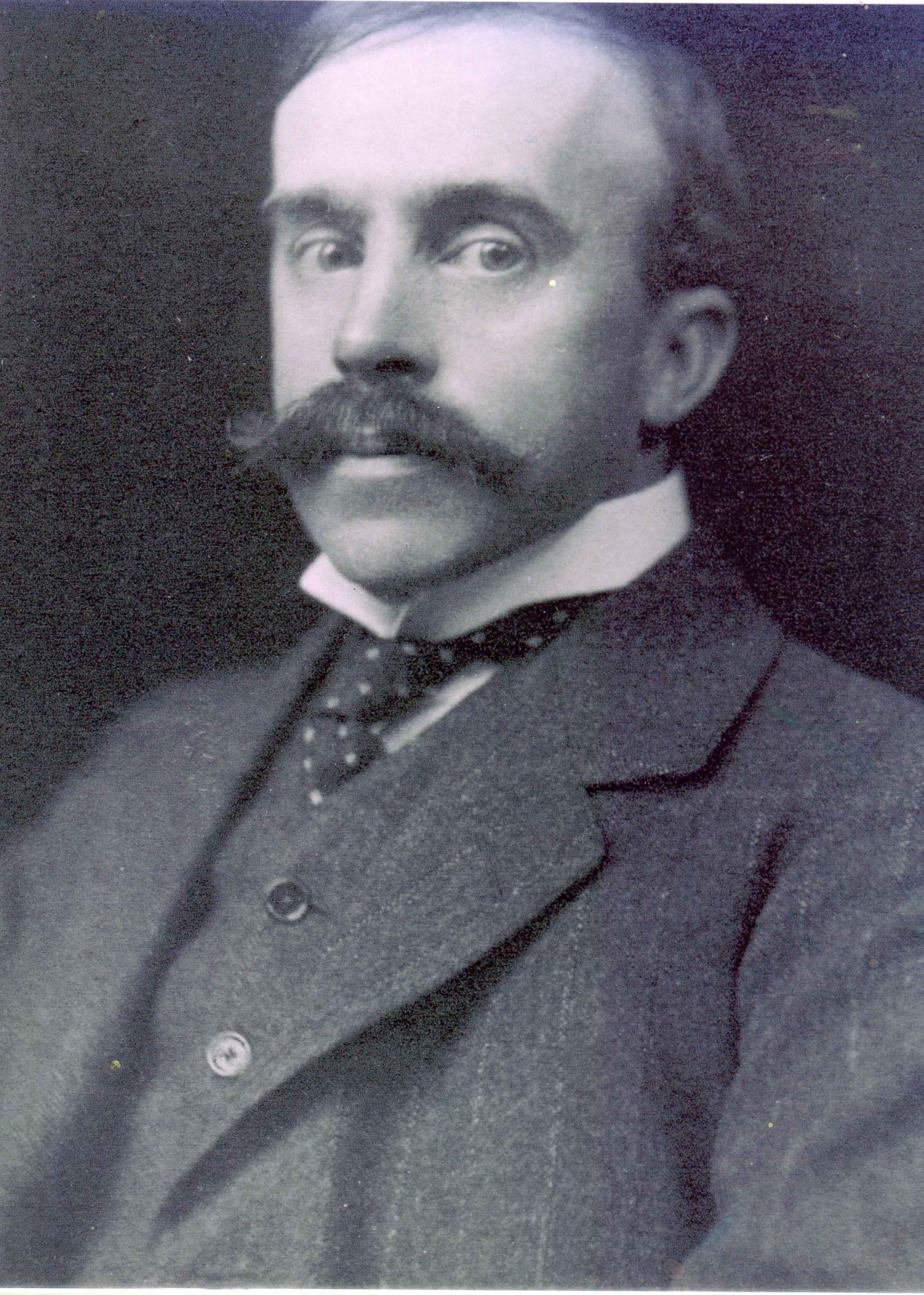
- Photographed in 1920
- Born: 20 April 1864; Gravesend, Kent, England
- Died: 8 November 1941 (aged 77); Frensham, Surrey
- Other name: Tommy Whibley
- Occupation: Classical scholar
- Spouse: Henriette Leiningen
- Parent(s): Ambrose Whibley and Mary Jean Davy

Leonard Whibley (20 April 1864 – 8 November 1941) was a British scholar who edited A Companion to Greek Studies from 1905 to 1931.

== Life ==
Leonard Whibley was born 20 April 1864 at Gravesend, Kent, England. His parents were Ambrose Whibley, silk mercer, and his second wife, Mary Jean Davy. He was educated at Bristol Grammar School and Pembroke College, Cambridge, and elected to a fellowship at Pembroke in 1889. His elder brother was Charles Whibley who was also educated at Bristol Grammar School and then Jesus College, Cambridge, where Charles took a first in classics in 1883.

Whibley was a half-brother of Fred Whibley, a copra trader on Niutao, Ellice Islands (now Tuvalu); and his half-sister was Eliza Eleanor (Lillie), wife of John T. Arundel. Arundel owned of J. T. Arundel and Company which evolved into the Pacific Islands Company, and later the Pacific Phosphate Company, which commenced phosphate mining in Nauru and Banaba Island (Ocean Island).

For a short time Whibley worked in publishing at Methuen and shared a house with his brother Charles, William Ernest Henley and George Warrington Steevens. He returned to academia with a lectureship in Classics (Ancient History) at Cambridge from 1899 to 1910. Whibley surprised his family and friends, when in 1920 at age 57, he married Henriette Leiningen, daughter of Major-General William Brown Barwell and Lise, Countess of Leiningen Westerburg, a descendant of the Alt-Leiningen-Westerburg branch of the aristocratic House of Leiningen. He died on 8 November 1941 at Frensham, Surrey.

== Publications ==
- Political parties in Athens during the Peloponnesian war. Prince Consort Dissertation, Cambridge University Press, 1888.
- Livy, Book V. Edited for the Syndics of the University Press. by L. Whibley, M.A., Fellow of Pembroke College, Cambridge. Cambridge, at the University Press, (1890).
- Greek Oligarchies. Their Character and Organisation. London: Metheun & Chicago: G.P. Putnam's Sons, 1896. A full-length work on oligarchic government in Classical Greece.
- (ed.) A Companion to Greek Studies, Cambridge University Press, 1905–1931.
- (ed. with Paget Toynbee) Correspondence of Thomas Gray (1716–1771), 3 vols., Oxford: Clarendon Press, 1935. Repr. 1971 with corrections by H. W. Starr (ed.).
