= Samuel Harris (historian) =

Samuel Harris (1682–1733) was an English clergyman and academic, the first professor of modern history at the University of Cambridge.

== Life ==
Born on 9 December 1682, he entered Merchant Taylors' School on 11 September 1694, and went to Peterhouse, Cambridge, where he graduated B.A. 1703, M.A. 1707, and was elected fellow. He was Craven scholar of the university in 1701.

Harris was ordained in 1708, and became rector of Intwood. He was elected a Fellow of the Royal Society in 1722.

In October 1724 Harris was admitted first Regius Professor of modern history at Cambridge. The professorship was founded by George I in May of that year. He died on 21 December 1733.

== Works ==
Harris's inaugural lecture (in Latin) was printed. He was author also of a commentary on the 53rd chapter of Isaiah, which his widow Mary issued after his death in 1735 (London), and dedicated to Queen Caroline.

== Notes ==
Attribution

This article incorporates text from a publication now in the public domain: Stephen, Leslie; Lee, Sidney, eds. (1891). "Harris, Samuel". Dictionary of National Biography. Vol. 25. London: Smith, Elder & Co.
