= Regius Professor of History (Cambridge) =

Senior professorship in history at Cambridge University, England

Regius Professorship of History is one of the senior chairs in history at the University of Cambridge. It was founded in 1724 by George I as the Regius Professorship of Modern History.

== History ==
The Regius Professorship was originally intended by George I to teach contemporary European history, to correct "the prejudice that has accrued to the ... University from this Defect, Persons of Foreign Nations being often employed in the Education and Tuition of Youth". Two modern language instructors were required to be paid for out of the Professor's salary, which was set at £400 per year, at the time nearly equal to the stipends of all other Cambridge professors put together. The University, in accepting the benefaction, agreed that the professorship would ensure "our Nobility and Gentry will be under no Temptation of sending for persons from foreign Countries to be entrusted with the education of their children." However, the practice of appointing language instructors died out by 1724, Regius Professors instead retaining the whole stipend for themselves, and in 1861 this requirement was formally dropped.

The professorship's field of modern history was intended to encompass all post-classical history, beginning from the fall of Rome. However, for the first few decades of the professorship's existence, only ancient history was studied in the University, and so the Regius Professorship of Modern History was little more than a sinecure. However, by the time an independent History undergraduate examination was established in the 19th century, the professorship had more duties to fulfil.

Under the original understanding of modern history, the Regius Professorship was several times held by academics specialising in the Middle Ages. However, by the 21st century, the meaning of modern history had shifted to refer either to the history of the modern period following the middle ages, or of the late modern period following the early modern period. In 2010, the Queen in Council approved the removal of the word modern from the title to reflect this change in usage, on the recommendation of the Faculty of History and the University.

== Appointment ==
The appointment is by Royal Warrant on the recommendation of the Prime Minister of the day. Traditionally the Patronage Secretary at Number 10 Downing Street 'took soundings' in Cambridge and put two names before the Prime Minister, of which one was forwarded to the monarch. In 2008, however, Prime Minister Gordon Brown devolved the appointment of all the Regius Professorships onto appointments committees at their respective universities; the Vice-Chancellor is now required to forward the name of the successful candidate, who must have accepted the offer of the post, to the Cabinet Office, which then initiates the recommendation by the Prime Minister and the issuing of the Royal Warrant.

== List of Regius Professors ==
=== Regius Professors of Modern History ===
- Samuel Harris 1724
- Shallet Turner 1735
- Lawrence Brockett 1762
- Thomas Gray 1768
- John Symonds 1771
- William Smyth 1807
- Sir James Stephen 1849
- Rev'd Charles Kingsley 1860
- Sir John Seeley KCMG 1869
- John Dalberg-Acton, 1st Baron Acton KCVO 1895
- John Bury 1902
- George Trevelyan OM CBE 1927
- Sir George Clark 1943
- Sir James Butler 1947
- Rev'd M. David Knowles OSB 1954
- Sir Herbert Butterfield 1963
- Rev'd William Owen Chadwick OM KBE 1968
- Sir Geoffrey Elton 1983
- Patrick Collinson CBE 1988
- Quentin Skinner 1996
- Sir Richard J. Evans 2008

=== Regius Professors of History ===
- Sir Richard J. Evans 2010
- Sir Christopher Clark 2014

== See also ==
- Regius Professor of History (Oxford)
