= Thomas Gray =

English poet and classical scholar (1716–1771)

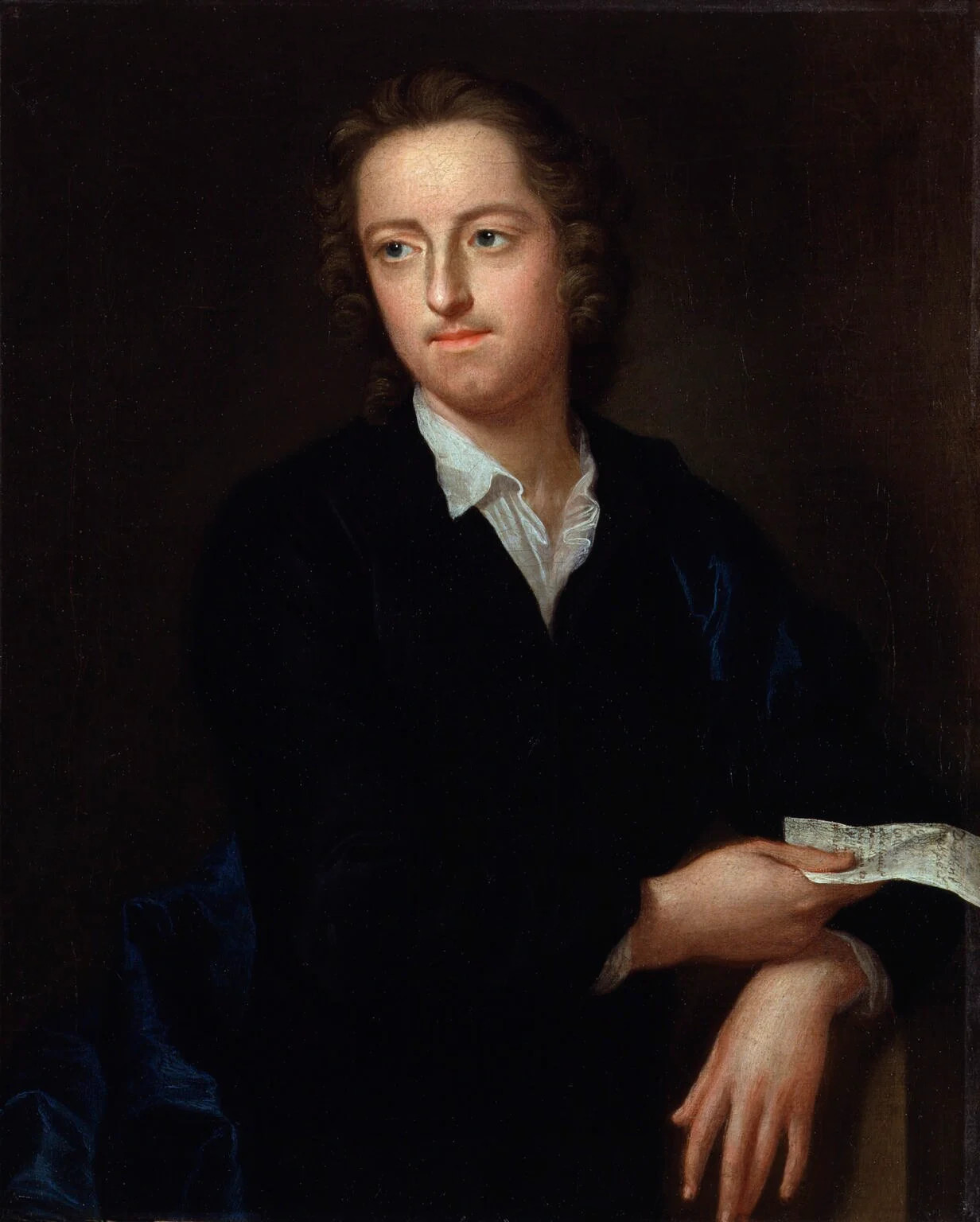
- Portrait by John Giles Eccardt, 1747–1748
- Born: 26 December 1716; Cornhill, London, England
- Died: 30 July 1771 (aged 54); Cambridge, Cambridgeshire, England
- Education: Eton College; Peterhouse, Cambridge
- Occupations: Poet, historian

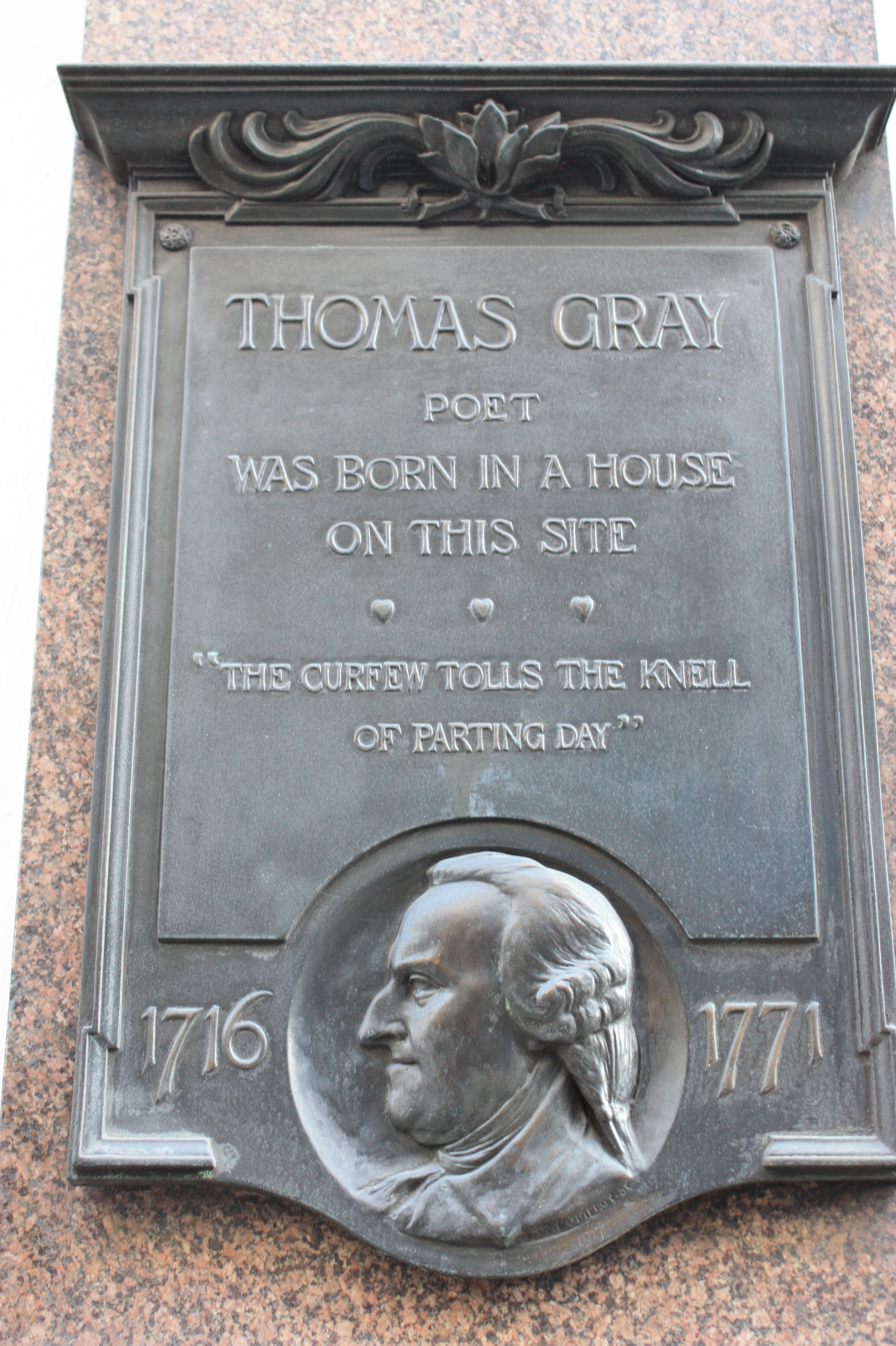
Plaque marking Thomas Gray's birthplace at 39 Cornhill, London

Thomas Gray (26 December 1716 – 30 July 1771) was an English poet, letter-writer, and classical scholar at Cambridge University, being a fellow first of Peterhouse then of Pembroke College. He is widely known for his Elegy Written in a Country Churchyard, published in 1751. Gray was a self-critical writer who published only 13 poems in his lifetime, despite being very popular. He was even offered the position of Poet Laureate in 1757 after the death of Colley Cibber, though he declined.

== Early life and education ==
Thomas Gray was born in Cornhill, London. His father, Philip Gray, was a scrivener and his mother, Dorothy Antrobus, was a milliner. He was the fifth of twelve children, and the only one to survive infancy. An 1803 newspaper article including a biography of Gray suggests that Gray almost died in infancy due to suffocation from a fullness of blood. However, his mother "ventured to open a vein with her own hand, which instantly removed the paroxysm", saving his life. He lived with his mother after she left his abusive and mentally unwell father.

Gray's mother paid for him to go to Eton College, where his uncles Robert and William Antrobus worked. Robert became Gray's first teacher and helped inspire in Gray a love for botany and observational science. Gray's other uncle, William, became his tutor. He recalled his schooldays as a time of great happiness, as is evident in his "Ode on a Distant Prospect of Eton College". Gray was a delicate and scholarly boy who spent his time reading and avoiding athletics. He lived in his uncle's household rather than at college. He made three close friends at Eton: Horace Walpole, son of the Prime Minister Robert Walpole; Thomas Ashton; and Richard West, son of another Richard West (who was briefly Lord Chancellor of Ireland). The four prided themselves on their sense of style, sense of humour, and appreciation of beauty. They were called the "quadruple alliance". Gray's nickname in the “Quadruple Alliance” was Orozmades, “the Zoroastrian divinity, who is mentioned in Lee’s The Rival Queens as a ‘dreadful god’ who from his cave issues groans and shrieks to predict the fall of Babylon.”

In 1734, Gray went up to Peterhouse, Cambridge. He found the curriculum dull. He wrote letters to friends listing all the things he disliked: the masters ("mad with Pride") and the Fellows ("sleepy, drunken, dull, illiterate Things"). Intended by his family for the law, he spent most of his time as an undergraduate reading classical and modern literature, and playing Vivaldi and Scarlatti on the harpsichord for relaxation.

In 1738, Gray accompanied his old school friend Walpole on his Grand Tour of Europe, possibly at Walpole's expense. The two fell out and parted in Tuscany because Walpole wanted to attend fashionable parties and Gray wanted to visit all the antiquities. They were reconciled a few years later. It was Walpole who later helped publish Gray's poetry. When Gray sent his most famous poem, "Elegy", to Walpole, Walpole sent off the poem as a manuscript and it appeared in different magazines. Gray then published the poem himself and received the credit he was due.

== Writing and academia ==
Gray began seriously writing poems in 1742, mainly after the death of his close friend Richard West, which inspired "Sonnet on the Death of Richard West". He moved to Cambridge and began a self-directed programme of literary study, becoming one of the most learned men of his time. He became a Fellow first of Peterhouse, and later of Pembroke College, Cambridge. According to college tradition, he left Peterhouse for Pembroke College after being the victim of a practical joke played by undergraduates. Gray is supposed to have been afraid of fire, and had attached a bar outside his window to which a rope could be tied. After being woken by undergraduates with a fire made of shavings, Gray climbed down the rope but landed in a tub of water which had been placed below his window.

Gray spent most of his life as a scholar in Cambridge, and only later in his life did he begin travelling again. Although he was one of the least productive poets (his collected works published during his lifetime amount to fewer than 1,000 lines), he is regarded as the foremost English-language poet of the mid-18th century. In 1757, he was offered the post of Poet Laureate, which he refused. Gray was so self-critical and fearful of failure that he published only thirteen poems during his lifetime. He once wrote that he feared his collected works would be "mistaken for the works of a flea." Walpole said that "He never wrote anything easily but things of Humour." Gray came to be known as one of the "Graveyard poets" of the late 18th century, along with Oliver Goldsmith, William Cowper, and Christopher Smart. Gray perhaps knew these men, sharing ideas about death, mortality, and the finality and sublimity of death.

In 1762, the Regius chair of Modern History at Cambridge, a sinecure which carried a salary of £400, fell vacant after the death of Shallet Turner, and Gray's friends lobbied the government unsuccessfully to secure the position for him. In the event, Gray lost out to Lawrence Brockett, but he secured the position in 1768 after Brockett's death.

== Poems ==
- Ode on the Spring (written in 1742)
- On the Death of Richard West (written in 1742)
- Ode on the Death of a Favourite Cat, Drowned in a Tub of Goldfishes (written in 1747)
- Ode to a Distant Prospect of Eton College (written in 1747 and published anonymously)
- Elegy Written in a Country Churchyard (written between 1745 and 1750)
- The Progress of Poesy: A Pindaric Ode (written between 1751 and 1754)
- The Bard: A Pindaric Ode (written between 1755 and 1757)
- The Fatal Sisters: An Ode (written in 1761)

== "Elegy" masterpiece ==
It is believed by a number of writers that Gray began writing arguably his most celebrated piece, the Elegy Written in a Country Churchyard, in the graveyard of St Giles' parish church in Stoke Poges, Buckinghamshire (though this claim is not exclusive), in 1742. After several years of leaving it unfinished, he completed it in 1750 (see elegy for the form). The poem was a literary sensation when published by Robert Dodsley in February 1751 (see 1751 in poetry). Its reflective, calm, and stoic tone was greatly admired, and it was pirated, imitated, quoted, and translated into Latin and Greek. It is still one of the most popular and frequently quoted poems in the English language.

In 1759, during the Seven Years War, before the Battle of the Plains of Abraham, British General James Wolfe is said to have recited it to one of his officers, adding, "I would prefer being the author of that Poem to the glory of beating the French to-morrow."

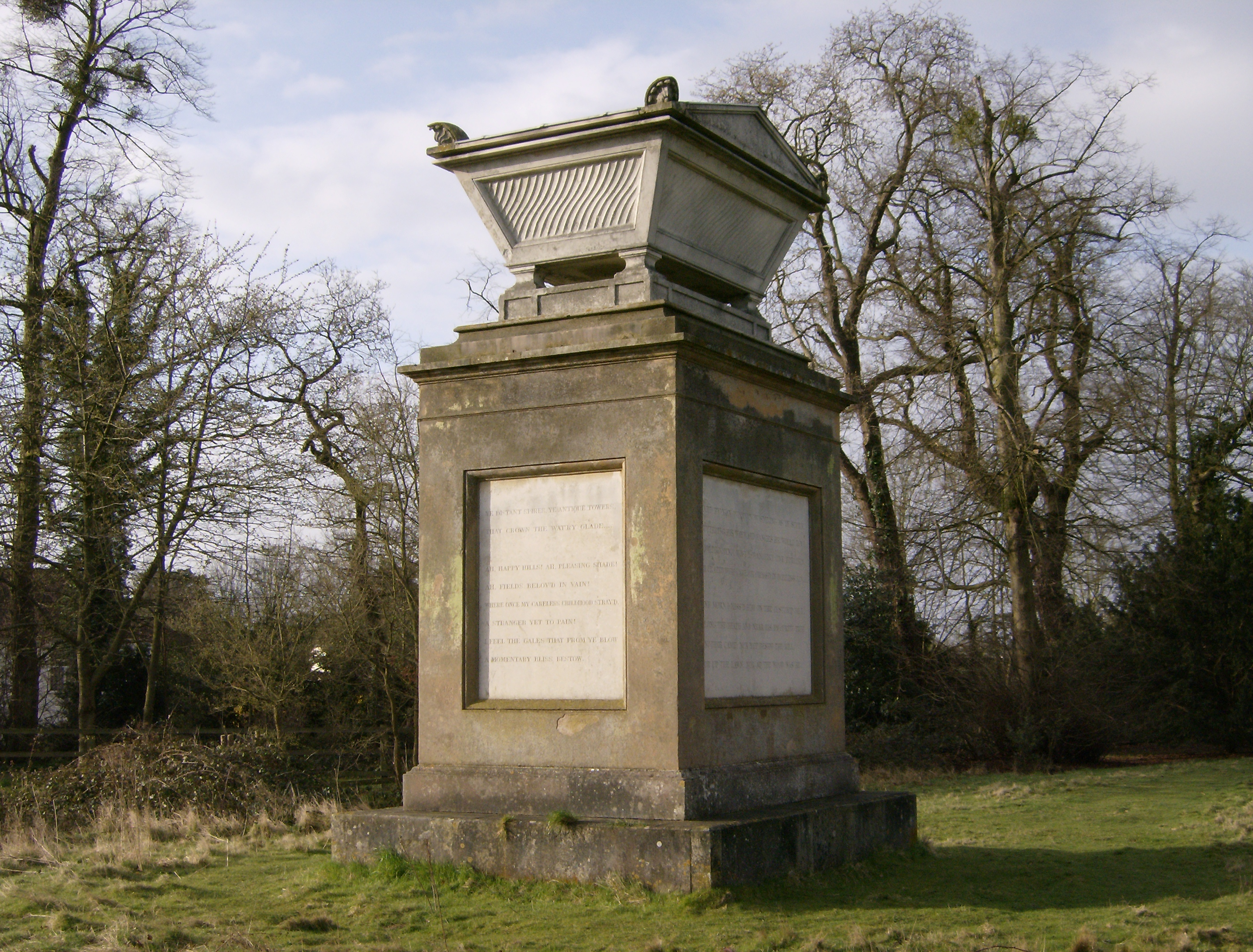
Monument, in Stoke Poges, inscribed with Gray's Elegy

The Elegy was recognised immediately for its beauty and skill. It contains many phrases which have entered the common English lexicon, either on their own or as quoted in other works. These include:

- "The Paths of Glory" (the title of a 1957 anti-war movie about World War I, produced by and starring Kirk Douglas, and directed by Stanley Kubrick, based on a novel of the same name by Humphrey Cobb).
- "Celestial fire"
- "Some mute inglorious Milton"
- "Far from the Madding Crowd" (the title of a novel by Thomas Hardy, filmed several times)
- "Full many a flower is born to blush unseen, and waste its sweetness on the desert air," is quoted often, including by Annie Savoy (Susan Sarandon) in the film Bull Durham
- "The unlettered muse"
- "Kindred spirit"

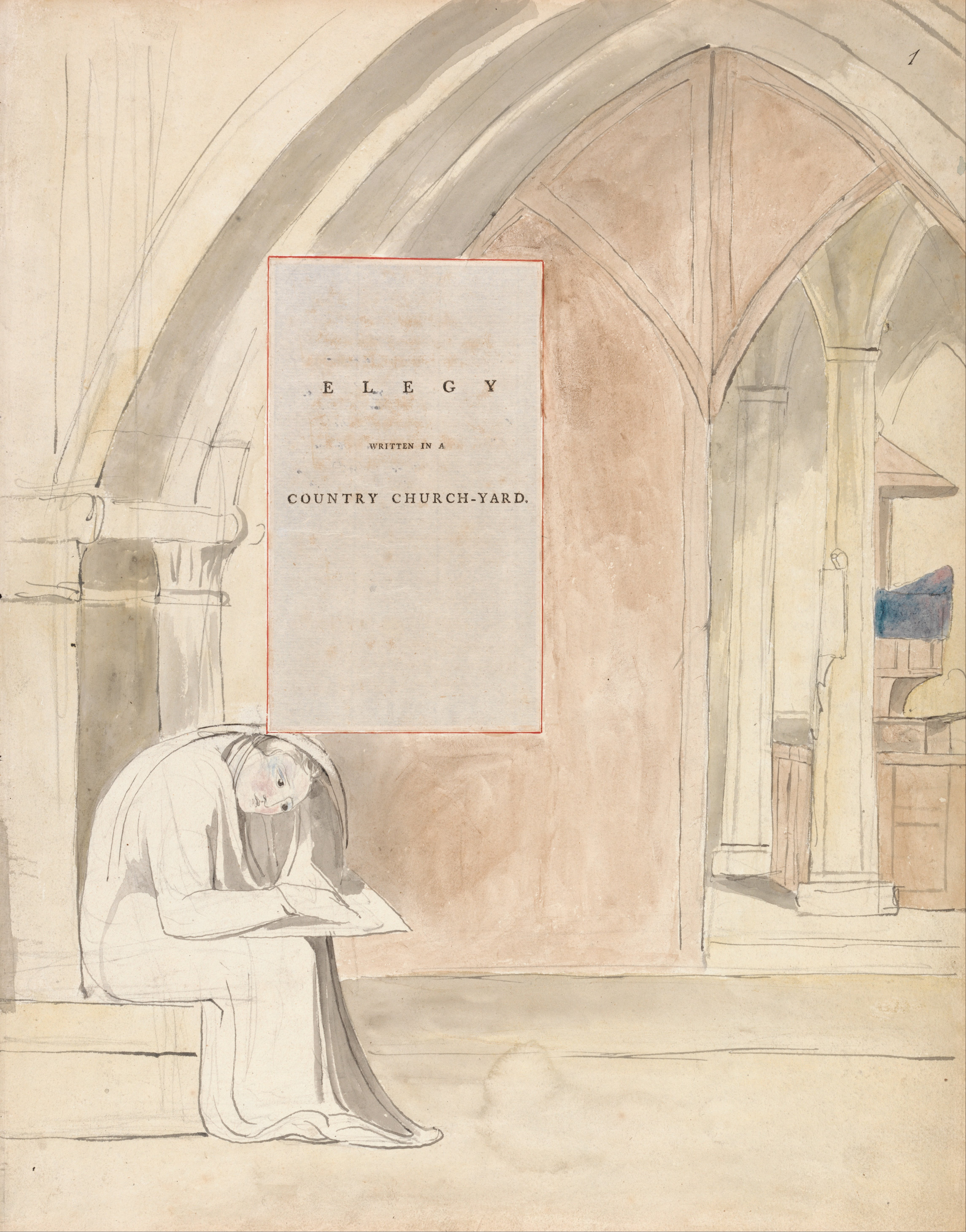
William Blake's illustration for Thomas Gray

"Elegy" contemplates such themes as death and afterlife. These themes foreshadowed the upcoming Gothic movement. It is suggested that perhaps Gray found inspiration for his poem by visiting the grave-site of his aunt, Mary Antrobus. The aunt was buried at the graveyard by the St. Giles' churchyard, which he and his mother would visit. This is the same grave-site where Gray himself was later buried.

Gray also wrote light verse, including Ode on the Death of a Favourite Cat, Drowned in a Tub of Gold Fishes, a mock-heroic elegy concerning Horace Walpole's cat. Even this humorous poem contains some of Gray's most famous lines. Walpole owned two cats: Zara and Selima. Scholars allude to the name Selima mentioned in the poem. After setting the scene with the couplet "What female heart can gold despise? What cat's averse to fish?", the poem moves to its multiple proverbial conclusion: "a fav'rite has no friend", "[k]now one false step is ne'er retrieved" and "nor all that glisters, gold". (Walpole later displayed the fatal china vase (the tub) on a pedestal at his house in Strawberry Hill, where it can still be seen).

Gray's surviving letters also show his sharp observation and playful sense of humour. He is well known for his phrase, "where ignorance is bliss, 'tis folly to be wise", from Ode on a Distant Prospect of Eton College. It has been asserted that the Ode also abounds with images which find "a mirror in every mind". This was stated by Samuel Johnson who said of the poem: "I rejoice to concur with the common reader ... The Church-yard abounds with images which find a mirror in every mind, and with sentiments to which every bosom returns an echo." Indeed, Gray's poem follows the style of the mid-century literary endeavour to write of "universal feelings". Samuel Johnson also said of Gray that he spoke in "two languages". He spoke in the language of "public" and "private" and according to Johnson, he should have spoken more in his private language as he did in his "Elegy" poem.

== Forms ==
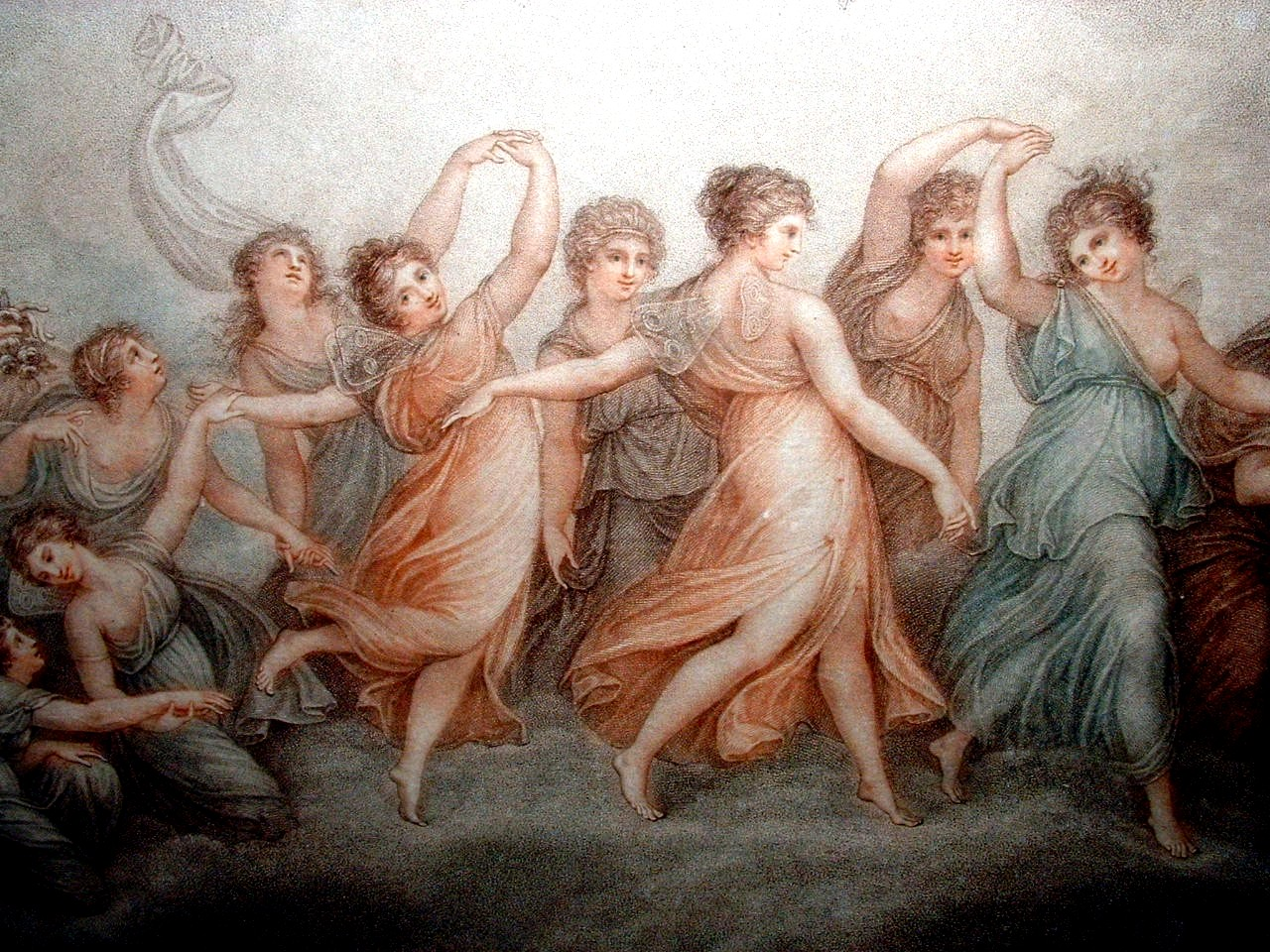
The Hours by Maria Cosway, an illustration to Gray's poem Ode on the Spring, referring to the lines "Lo! where the rosy-bosomed Hours, Fair Venus' train, appear"

Gray considered his two Pindaric odes, The Progress of Poesy and The Bard, as his best works. Pindaric odes are to be written with fire and passion, unlike the calmer and more reflective Horatian odes such as Ode on a distant Prospect of Eton College. The Bard tells of a wild Welsh poet cursing the Norman king Edward I after his conquest of Wales and prophesying in detail the downfall of the House of Plantagenet. It is melodramatic, and ends with the bard hurling himself to his death from the top of a mountain.

When his duties allowed, Gray travelled widely throughout Britain to places such as Yorkshire, Derbyshire, Scotland and most notably the Lake District (see his Journal of a Visit to the Lake District in 1769) in search of picturesque landscapes and ancient monuments. These elements were not generally valued in the early 18th century, when the popular taste ran to classical styles in architecture and literature, and most people liked their scenery tame and well-tended. The Gothic details that appear in his Elegy and The Bard are a part of the first foreshadowing of the Romantic movement that dominated the early 19th century, when William Wordsworth and the other Lake poets taught people to value the picturesque, the sublime, and the Gothic. Gray combined traditional forms and poetic diction with new topics and modes of expression, and may be considered as a classically focused precursor of the romantic revival.

Gray's connection to the Romantic poets is vexed. In the prefaces to the 1800 and 1802 editions of Wordsworth's and Samuel Taylor Coleridge's Lyrical Ballads, Wordsworth singled out Gray's "Sonnet on the Death of Richard West" to exemplify what he found most objectionable in poetry, declaring it was

"Gray, who was at the head of those who, by their reasonings, have attempted to widen the space of separation betwixt prose and metrical composition, and was more than any other man curiously elaborate in the structure of his own poetic diction."

Gray wrote in a letter to West, that "the language of the age is never the language of poetry."

== Death ==
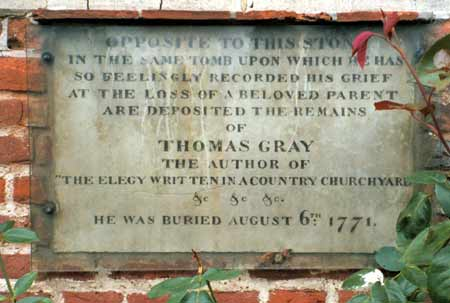
Plaque adjacent to the tomb of Thomas Gray in Stoke Poges Churchyard

Gray died on 30 July 1771 in Cambridge, and was buried beside his mother in the churchyard of the Church of St Giles, Stoke Poges, the reputed (though disputed) setting for his famous Elegy. His grave can still be seen there. A monument sculpted by John Bacon was also erected in Westminster Abbey soon after his death.

== Scholarly reception ==
Today, Gray remains a topic of academic discussion. Some scholars analyze his work for his use of language and inspiration from Greek classics and Norse poetry. Other scholars, such as George E. Haggerty, focus on Gray's various relationships with other men, examining his letters and poetry for instances of "male-male love" and "same-sex desire".

== Honours ==
- Gray's biographer William Mason erected a monument to him, designed by John Bacon the Elder, in Poets' Corner at Westminster Abbey in 1778.
- John Penn "of Stoke" had a memorial to Gray built near St Giles' churchyard and engraved with extracts from the "Elegy".
- A plaque in Cornhill, London marks his birthplace.
