= Thomas West (priest) =

- Born: 1720; Scotland
- Died: 10 July 1779 (aged 58–59); Sizergh Castle, Westmorland
- Known for: Antiquarian, author

Thomas West (1720 – 10 July 1779) was a Jesuit priest, antiquary and author, significant in being one of the first to write about the attractions of the Lake District. Partly through his book, A Guide to the Lakes, the Romantic vision of the scenery and wilderness of the north of England took hold, ushering in a period of continued tourism in the Lakes.

== Life ==
West was born in Scotland in 1720, and was ordained a Catholic priest. He visited Europe, and received at least some of his education there, specialising in various branches of natural philosophy. He returned to Britain in his later life, moving to Furness in 1774 and residing at the seventeenth century Tytup Hall. West dedicated his remaining years to learning and writing about the area's landscape and history, publishing The Antiquities of Furness in 1774. He then embarked on his magnum opus, his Guide to the Lakes.

== A Guide to the Lakes ==
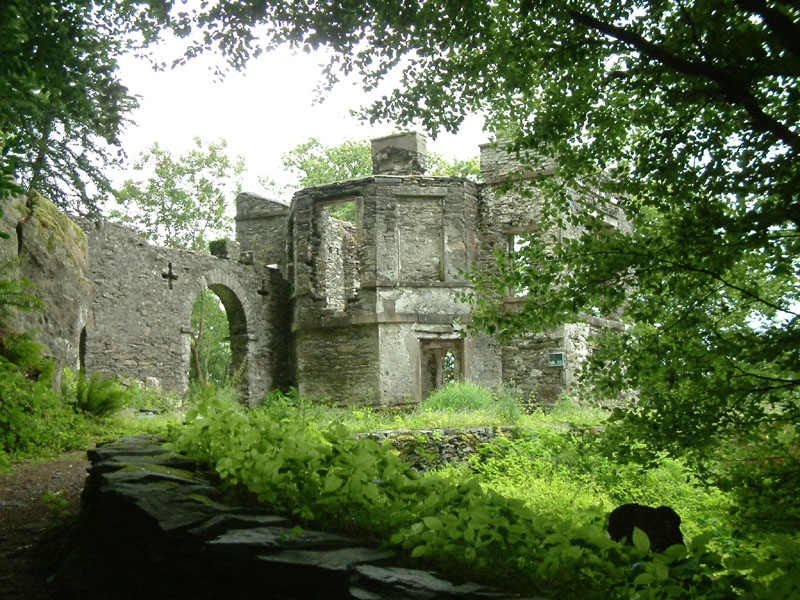
Claife Station,'viewing stations', to allow visiting tourists and artists to better appreciate the picturesque Lake District.

West had travelled widely throughout continental Europe, and after accompanying various parties visiting the lakes, decided to write a detailed account of the scenery and landscape. Fellow Lakes resident William Brownrigg may have been a contributing factor in this decision. West set out to create a guide that would be of particular use to artists, writing in his introduction that he aimed

'To encourage the taste of visiting the lakes by furnishing the traveller with a Guide; and for that purpose, the writer has here collected and laid before him, all the select stations and points of view, noticed by those authors who have last made the tour of the lakes, verified by his own repeated observations. '

To this end he included various 'stations' or viewpoints around the lakes, from which tourists would be encouraged to appreciate the views in terms of their aesthetic qualities. Published in 1778 the book was a major success. As well as being the first guidebook to the lakes, West was amongst the first writers to challenge the view of the wild and savage north, and his book was one of the first to stress the notion of the picturesque environment. It was particularly influential at a time when Grand Tours were popular, as West claimed the Lakes contained much of the scenery that could be enjoyed on the continent, likening it to the Alps or the Apennines. His book was followed by similar works by William Gilpin, Uvedale Price and William Wordsworth. West's book was the beginning of the era of 'true tourism' in the Lake District. It followed on from Dr John Brown's assessment in 1753 that the 'perfection' of the area rested on 'Beauty, horror and immensity', and challenged Daniel Defoe's interpretation of it in 1698 as the 'wildest, the most barren and frightful' place he had ever seen. Despite criticism and satirical spoofs of both the prose of the guides and the attitudes of the tourists they attracted to the Lakes from the likes of Thomas Rowlandson and William Combe, the book ran to seven editions before the turn of the century.

It was to be West's last work. He collected material for the second edition, but died a year after the book was first published, on 10 July 1779 at Sizergh Castle, Westmorland. He was buried in the Strickland family chapel, at Kendal Parish Church.
