= 1807 in poetry =

This article covers 1807 in poetry. Nationality words link to articles with information on the nation's poetry or literature (for instance, Irish or France).

== Works published ==
=== Ireland ===
- Thomas Moore, Irish Melodies, Irish poet published in the United Kingdom
- Sydney Owenson (later Lady Morgan), The Lay of an Irish Harp; or, Metrical Fragments, Irish poet published in the United Kingdom

=== United Kingdom ===
- Eaton Stannard Barrett, writing under the pen name "Polypus", All the Talents: A satirical poem, the book went through 19 editions this year
- Samuel Egerton Brydges, Poems, the fourth, enlarged edition of Sonnets and other Poems 1785
- Lord Byron:
  - Hours of Idleness, which will be attacked in the Edinburgh Review
  - Poems on Various Occasions, published anonymously, privately printed
- George Crabbe, Poems, including "The Parish Register", nine editions by 1817
- Richard Cumberland and Sir James Burges, The Exodiad
- Catherine Ann Dorset, The Peacock 'At Home', published anonymously ("written by a lady"); for children; extremely popular; a sequel to William Roscoe's The Butterfly's Ball, also published this year
- James Grahame, Poems
- Lady Anne Hamilton, The Epics of the Ton; or, The Glories of the Great World
- William Hazlitt, editor, The Eloquence of the British Senate, published anonymously (anthology)
- James Hogg, Thomas Mounsey Cunningham and others, The Forest Minstrel, includes poems published anonymously
- James Hogg, The Mountain Bard
- Ewen MacLachlan, Attempts in Verse
- Thomas Moore, Irish Melodies
- Sydney Owenson (later Lady Morgan), The Lay of an Irish Harp; or, Metrical Fragments
- William Roscoe, The Butterfly's Ball and the Grasshopper's Feast, first published in the Gentleman's Magazine in November 1806
- Charlotte Turner Smith, Beachy Head, with Other Poems
- William Sotheby, Saul
- Robert Southey, editor, Specimens of the Later English Poets, published as a complement to George Ellis's Specimens of the Early English Poems, 1790; anthology
- Henry Kirke White, The Remains of Henry Kirke White, edited by Robert Southey (posthumous)

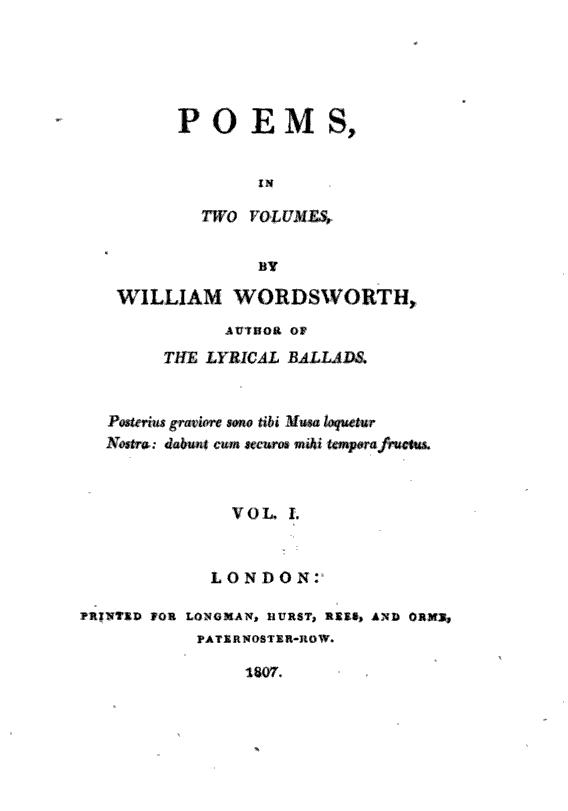
Title page of William Wordsworth's Poems in Two Volumes

==== Wordsworth's Poems in Two Volumes ====
William Wordsworth's, Poems in Two Volumes includes:

- "Resolution and Independence"
- "I Wandered Lonely as a Cloud" (sometimes anthologized as "The Daffodils")
- "My Heart Leaps Up"
- "Ode: Intimations of Immortality"
- "Ode to Duty"
- "The Solitary Reaper"
- "Elegiac Stanzas"
- "Composed upon Westminster Bridge, September 3, 1802"
- "London, 1802"
- "The world is too much with us"

=== United States ===
- Richard Alsop and others, The Echo, With Other Poems, anthology of poems by the Hartford Wits that had appeared in the American Mercury magazine from 1791 to 1805, the primary contributors were Richard Alsop and Theodore Dwight; other contributors included Lemuel Hopkins, H. H. Brackenridge (on the Indian War), Mason Cogswell, William Trumbull, Elihu Hubbard Smith; much of the contents consisted of pro-Federalist burlesques on social and political issues of the day; New York: "Printed at the Porcupine Press by Pasquin Petronius"
- Joel Barlow, The Columbiad, expansion and revision of The Vision of Columbus 1787, in heroic couplets; in the poem, Barlow predicts the building of the Panama Canal, airplanes, submarines and an organization resembling the United Nations

=== Other ===
- Adam Oehlenschlager, Nordiske Digte ("Nordic Poems"), including plays Denmark

== Births ==
Death years link to the corresponding "[year] in poetry" article:

- February 27 – Henry Wadsworth Longfellow (died 1882), American poet and academic
- April 10 – Henry Louis Vivian Derozio (died 1831), Indian teacher and poet
- August 31 – Thomas Miller (died 1874), English "ploughman poet" and novelist
- September 9 – Richard Chenevix Trench (died 1886), Anglo-Irish Anglican archbishop and poet
- October 18 – Thomas Holley Chivers (died 1858), American physician and poet
- November 16 – Jónas Hallgrímsson (died 1845), Icelandic poet
- November 17 – Vladimir Benediktov (died 1873), Russian poet and translator
- December 17 – John Greenleaf Whittier (died 1892), American poet
- Also – Robert Montgomery (died 1855), English poetaster and clergyman

== Deaths ==
Birth years link to the corresponding "[year] in poetry" article:

- December 3 – Clara Reeve (born 1729), English novelist and poet
- December 21 – John Newton (born 1725), English Anglican clergyman, former slave-ship captain, author of many hymns, including "Amazing Grace"
- Approximate date – Magtymguly Pyragy (born 1724), Turkmen spiritual leader and poet

== See also ==
- Poetry
- List of years in poetry
- List of years in literature
- 19th century in literature
- 19th century in poetry
- Romantic poetry
- Golden Age of Russian Poetry (1800–1850)
- Weimar Classicism period in Germany, commonly considered to have begun in 1788 and to have ended either in 1805, with the death of Friedrich Schiller, or 1832, with the death of Goethe
- List of poets

== Notes ==
- "A Timeline of English Poetry" Web page of the Representative Poetry Online Web site, University of Toronto
