= 1807 in the United Kingdom =

Events from the year 1807 in the United Kingdom.

== Incumbents ==
- Monarch – George III
- Prime Minister – William Grenville, 1st Baron Grenville (Coalition) (until 31 March); William Cavendish-Bentinck, 3rd Duke of Portland (Tory) (starting 31 March)
- Foreign Secretary – Charles Grey, Viscount Howick (until 25 March) George Canning (from 25 March)
- Home Secretary – Earl Spencer (until 25 March) Lord Liverpool (from 25 March)
- Secretary of War – William Windham (until 5 March) Lord Castlereagh (from 5 March)

== Events ==
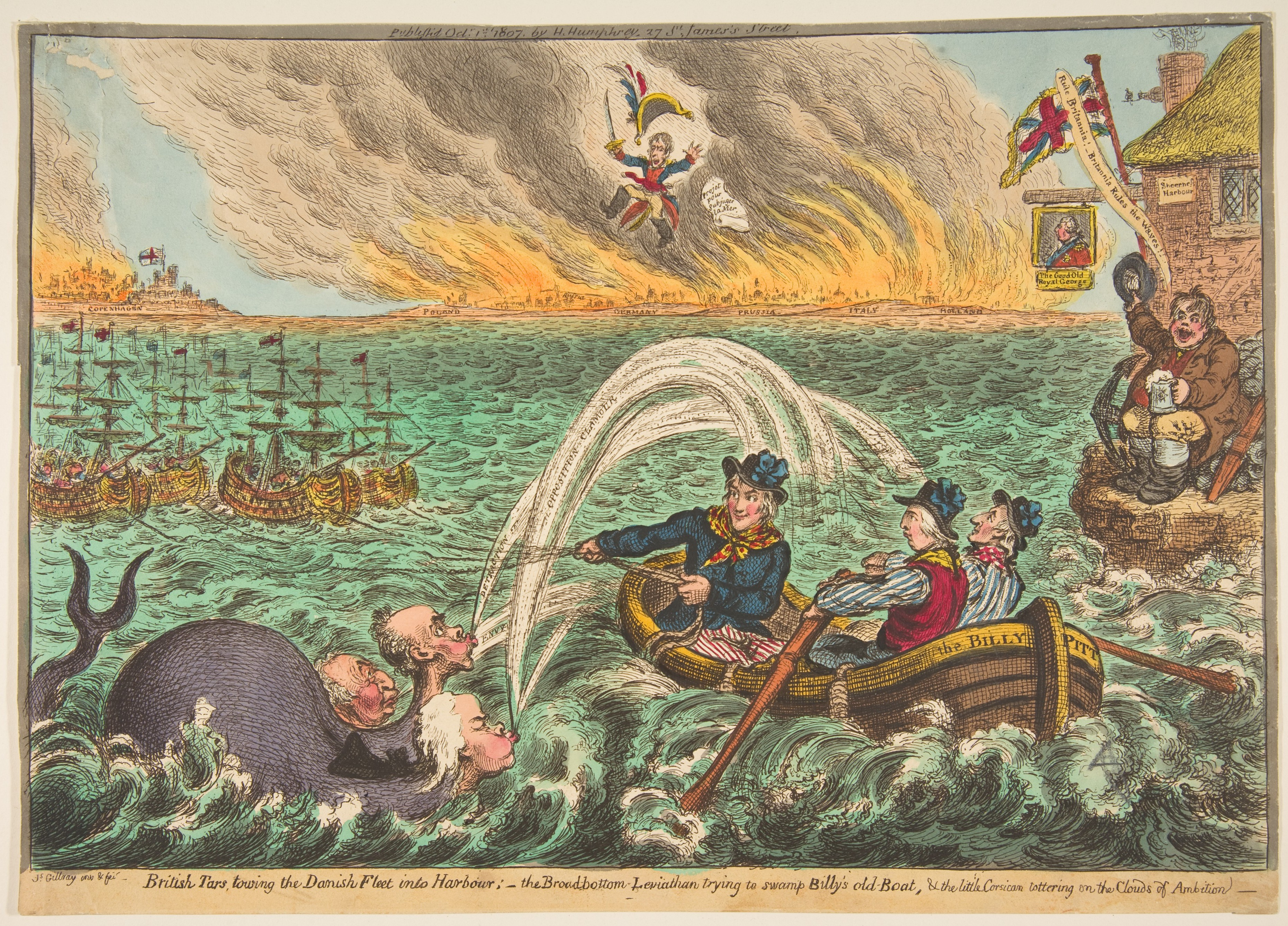
James Gillray's British Tars Towing the Danish Fleet into Harbour.

- 1 January – The island of Curaçao is captured by Admiral Charles Brisbane.
- 7 January – The United Kingdom issues an Order in Council prohibiting British ships from trading with France or its allies.
- 20 January – The Sierra Leone Company, faced with bankruptcy because of the imminent abolition of the slave trade in British colonies, petitions the British government for purchase and transfer of its property to the Crown; Parliament approves the transfer on 29 July, and it takes effect on 1 January, 1808.
- 28 January – Pall Mall, London becomes the first street with gas lighting in a demonstration by Frederick Albert Winsor.
- 3 February – Napoleonic Wars and Anglo-Spanish War – Battle of Montevideo: the British Army captures Montevideo from the Spanish Empire as part of the British invasions of the River Plate.
- 18 February – The Royal Navy gun-brig Snipe runs aground 60 yards (55 m) off Great Yarmouth in a storm, with around 200 people drowned, inspiring Captain Manby to invent the Manby Mortar.
- 23 February
  - 1807 Newgate disaster: Around forty people are killed in a crush attending a public hanging in London.
  - The Slave Trade Act is passed in the House of Commons by an overwhelming majority.
- 25 March
  - The Slave Trade Act becomes law, abolishing the slave trade throughout the British Empire with effect from 1 May (slavery itself is abolished in British colonies in 1833).
  - The Swansea and Mumbles Railway, at this time known as the Oystermouth Railway, becomes the first passenger carrying railway in the world.
- 31 March – Duke of Portland asked to form a government following the collapse of the Ministry of all the Talents.
- 18 April – Harwich ferry disaster: 60 to 90 soldiers and their families drown when a boat capsizes off Landguard Fort.
- 4 May–9 June – The Duke of Portland wins the general election.
- 31 May – Primitive Methodism originates in an All Day of Prayer at Mow Cop in north Staffordshire.
- June – First Ascot Gold Cup held.
- 22 June – Chesapeake–Leopard affair: Royal Navy warship HMS Leopard attacks and boards the United States Navy frigate USS Chesapeake off Norfolk, Virginia, seeking deserters.
- 5 July – Disastrous attack on Buenos Aires.
- 7–9 July – Peace of Tilsit between France, Prussia and Russia. Napoleon and Emperor Alexander I of Russia ally together against the British.
- 13 July – With the death at Frascati of Cardinal Henry Benedict Stuart, the last Stuart claimant to the throne, the movement of Jacobitism comes to an effective end.
- 27 July – Kitty's Amelia sails from Liverpool on the last legal slaving voyage for a British vessel.
- 2–7 September – Battle of Copenhagen: The Royal Navy bombards Copenhagen with fire bombs and phosphorus rockets to prevent the Dano-Norwegian navy from surrendering to Napoleon. One third of the city is destroyed and two thousand citizens killed.
- 2 September – Anglo-Russian War (1807–1812): Russia declares war on the United Kingdom.
- 29 October – The exiled Louis XVIII of France arrives at Great Yarmouth with his entourage. It is only on 2 November that they receive permission to go ashore .
- 13 November – Geological Society founded in London.
- 20 November – sinking of the Rochdale and the Prince of Wales: The British troopships Rochdale (brig) and Prince of Wales (packet ship) sink in a storm in Dublin Bay with around 400 drowned.
- 5–11 December – Napoleonic Wars: Raid on Griessie – A British Royal Navy squadron attacks the Dutch port of Griessie on Java in the Dutch East Indies, eliminating the last Dutch naval force in the Pacific and concluding the Java campaign of 1806–1807.
- 22 December – The U.S. Congress passes the Embargo Act, a trade embargo on all foreign nations, largely in response to the British Orders in Council of 1807.
- 29 December – The Royal Navy ship of the line HMS Anson runs aground on Loe Bar, Cornwall, with around sixty people drowned, inspiring Henry Trengrouse to invent a rocket apparatus for saving life from shipwrecks and passage of the Burial of Drowned Persons Act 1808 to ensure respectful burial of drowned sailors.
- Undated – Potassium and sodium isolated by Sir Humphry Davy.

=== Ongoing ===
- Anglo-Spanish War, 1796–1808
- Napoleonic Wars, 1803–1815

== Publications ==
- Charles and Mary Lamb's children's book Tales from Shakespeare.
- Benjamin Tabart's version of the fairy tale The History of Jack and the Bean-Stalk.
- William Wordsworth's Poems in Two Volumes, including "Resolution and Independence", "I Wandered Lonely as a Cloud", "Ode: Intimations of Immortality" and "Composed upon Westminster Bridge, September 3, 1802".

== Births ==
- 8 February – Benjamin Waterhouse Hawkins, sculptor and natural history artist (died 1894)
- 3 April
  - Mary Carpenter, educational and social reformer (died 1877)
  - Jane Digby, aristocratic adventuress (died 1881 in Syria)
- 31 August – Thomas Miller, "ploughboy poet" and novelist (died 1874)
- 8 October – Harriet Taylor Mill, philosophical writer (died 1858)
- 19 October – Edward Bigge, Archdeacon of Lindisfarne (died 1844)
- 30 October – Christopher Wordsworth, Anglican bishop and Biblical commentator (died 1885)
- 30 November – William Farr, epidemiologist (died 1883)

== Deaths ==
- 5 January – Isaac Reed, Shakespearean editor (born 1742)
- 15 April – Durham Ox, shorthorn bull (born 1796)
- 18 May – John Douglas, Anglican bishop (born 1721)
- 13 July – Henry Benedict Stuart, claimant to the throne of the United Kingdom (born 1725)
- 18 July – Thomas Jones, mathematician (born 1756)
- 14 September – George Townshend, 1st Marquess Townshend, field marshal (born 1724)
- 21 December – John Newton, cleric and hymnist (born 1725)
