= London, 1802 =

1807 poem by William Wordsworth

London, 1802

MILTON! thou shouldst be living at this hour:
England hath need of thee: she is a fen
Of stagnant waters: altar, sword, and pen,
Fireside, the heroic wealth of hall and bower,
Have forfeited their ancient English dower
Of inward happiness. We are selfish men;
Oh! Raise us up, return to us again,
And give us manners, virtue, freedom, power!
Thy soul was like a Star, and dwelt apart;
Thou hadst a voice whose sound was like the sea:
Pure as the naked heavens, majestic, free,
So didst thou travel on life's common way,
In cheerful godliness; and yet thy heart
The lowliest duties on herself did lay.

"London, 1802" is a poem by the English Romantic poet William Wordsworth. In the poem Wordsworth castigates the English people as stagnant and selfish, and eulogises seventeenth-century poet John Milton.

Composed in 1802, "London, 1802" was published for the first time in Poems, in Two Volumes (1807).

== Structure and synopsis ==
Wordsworth begins the poem by wishing that Milton was still alive, for "England hath need of thee." This is because it is his opinion that England has stagnated morally by comparison to Milton's period. To this end, Wordsworth pleads for Milton to rather messianically "raise us up, return to us again; / And give us manners, virtue, freedom, power."

In the six subsequent lines (the sestet) following the first eight lines (the octave), Wordsworth explains why Milton could improve the English condition. Milton's soul, he explains, was as bright and noble as a star and "dwelt apart" from the crowd, not feeling the urge to conform to norms. Milton's voice resembled "the sea", "pure as the naked heavens, majestic, free". Furthermore, Milton never disdained the ordinary nature of life, but instead "travel[ed] on life's common way", remaining happy, pure (cheerful godliness), and humble (taking the "lowliest duties" on himself).

"London, 1802" reveals both Wordsworth's moralism and his growing conservatism. Wordsworth frequently sought to "communicate natural morality to his readers" through his poetry. In this sonnet, he urges morality and selflessness to his readers, criticising the English for being stagnant and selfish, for lacking "manners, virtue, [and] freedom." But he also refers to "inward happiness" as a natural English right, or "dower," and asks Milton to bestow "power" as well as virtue on the English. These are among Wordsworth's "few explicitly nationalistic verses—shades, perhaps, of the conservatism that took hold in his old age."

While it is common, and perhaps correct, to equate nationalism with conservatism in the modern era, it is hard to suggest that nationalism functioned that way in the Romantic context. The kind of nationalism Wordsworth proposed in the poem had something of a revolutionary nature to it. Wordsworth himself implies in a footnote to the poem that it could be read in such a manner, "written immediately after my return from France to London, when I could not but be struck, as here described, with the vanity and parade of our own country . . . as contrasted with the quiet, and I may say the desolation, that the revolution had produced in France." The moralism and nationalism of the poem occur simultaneously with and perhaps are the occasion for a call to overthrow the current social and political order, as had recently been done in France. Whether or not Wordsworth wanted the poem to be interpreted in such a way can and is called into question later in his note. Themes include morality, humanity, nature/the natural environment. He then tells Milton that his "soul was like a Star," because he was different even from his contemporaries in terms of the virtues listed above. The speaker tells Milton that his voice was like the sea and the sky, a part of nature and therefore natural: "majestic, free." The speaker also compliments Milton's ability to embody "cheerful godliness" even while doing the "lowliest duties." As stated above the speaker on several instances refers to Milton as a celestial being.

== Analysis ==
"London, 1802" is a Petrarchan sonnet with a rhyme scheme of ABBA ABBA CDD ECE. The poem is written in the second person and addresses the late poet John Milton, who lived from 1608–1674 and is most famous for having written Paradise Lost.

The poem has two main purposes, one of which is to pay homage to Milton by saying that he can save the entirety of England with his nobility and virtue. The other purpose of the poem is to draw attention to what Wordsworth feels are the problems with English society.

According to Wordsworth, England was once a great place of happiness, religion, chivalry, art, and literature, but at the present moment those virtues have been lost. Wordsworth can only describe modern England as a swampland, where people are selfish and must be taught about things like "manners, virtue, freedom, power."

Notice that Wordsworth compliments Milton by comparing him to things found in nature, such as the stars, the sea, and "the heavens." For Wordsworth, being likened to nature is the highest compliment possible.

== See also ==
- 1807 in poetry

== Sources ==
- Woodring, Carl. "Wordsworth". Boston: Houghton Mifflin, 1965.
