= On the Extinction of the Venetian Republic =

Sonnet by William Wordsworth

- by William Wordsworth
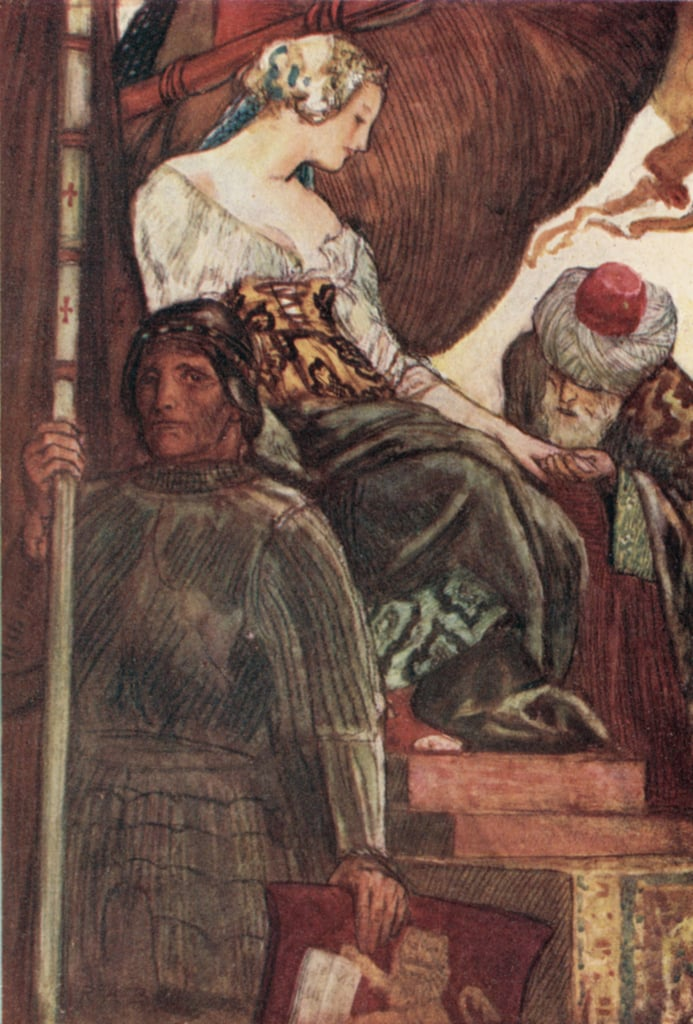
- Illustration by Robert Anning Bell for an edition of Palgrave's Golden Treasury (1907)
- Written: August 1802
- First published in: Poems, in Two Volumes
- Genre(s): Romanticism
- Meter: Iambic pentameter
- Rhyme scheme: ABBA ACCA DED EDE
- Publication date: 1807
- Lines: 14

Full text
- On the Extinction of the Venetian Republic at Wikisource

"On the Extinction of the Venetian Republic, 1802" is a Petrarchan sonnet written by the English poet William Wordsworth.

== Text ==
Wordsworth composed the sonnet in August 1802, and it was first published in Poems, in Two Volumes (1807). It was included among the "Sonnets dedicated to Liberty"; renamed in 1845, "Poems dedicated to National Independence and Liberty".

Once did She hold the gorgeous east in fee;
And was the safeguard of the west: the worth
Of Venice did not fall below her birth,
Venice, the eldest Child of Liberty.
She was a maiden City, bright and free;
No guile seduced, no force could violate;
And, when she took unto herself a Mate,
She must espouse the everlasting Sea.
And what if she had seen those glories fade,
Those titles vanish, and that strength decay;
Yet shall some tribute of regret be paid
When her long life hath reached its final day:
Men are we, and must grieve when even the Shade
Of that which once was great, is passed away.

== Analysis ==
Once did She hold the gorgeous east in fee.

The special glory of Venice dates from the conquest of Constantinople by the Latins in 1202. The Fourth Crusade—in which the French and Venetians alone took part—started from Venice, in October 1202, under the command of the Doge, Henry Dandolo. Its aim, however, was not the recovery of Palestine, but the conquest of Constantinople. At the close of the crusade, Venice received the Morea, part of Thessaly, the Cyclades, many of the Byzantine cities, and the coasts of the Hellespont, with three-eighths of the city of Constantinople itself, the Doge taking the title of 'Lord of three-eighths of the Roman Empire'.

And was the safeguard of the west.

This may refer to the prominent part which Venice took in the Crusades, or to the development of her naval power, which made her mistress of the Mediterranean for many years, and an effective bulwark against invasions from the East.

The eldest Child of Liberty.

The origin of the Venetian State was the flight of many of the inhabitants of the mainland—on the invasion of Italy by Attila—to the chain of islands that lie at the head of the Adriatic.

In the midst of the waters, free, indigent, laborious, and inaccessible, they gradually coalesced into a republic: the first foundations of Venice were laid in the island of Rialto. … On the verge of the two empires the Venetians exult in the belief of primitive and perpetual independence.

— Gibbon's Decline and Fall of the Roman Empire, chap. lx.

And, when she took unto herself a Mate,
She must espouse the everlasting Sea.

In 1177, Pope Alexander III appealed to the Venetian Republic for protection against the German Emperor. The Venetians were successful in a naval battle at Saboro, against Otho, the son of Frederick Barbarossa. In return, the Pope presented the Doge Liani with a ring, with which he told him to wed the Adriatic, that posterity might know that the sea was subject to Venice, "as a bride is to her husband".

In September 1796, nearly six years before this sonnet was written, the fate of the old Venetian Republic was sealed by the Treaty of Campo Formio. The French army under Napoleon had subdued Italy, and, having crossed the Alps, threatened Vienna. To avert impending disaster, the Emperor Francis arranged a treaty which extinguished the Venetian Republic. He divided its territory between himself and Napoleon, Austria retaining Istria, Dalmatia, and the left bank of the Adige in the Venetian State, with the "maiden city" itself; France receiving the rest of the territory and the Ionian Islands. Since the date of that treaty the city has twice been annexed to Italy.

== Translations ==
The Hungarian translation by Miklós Radnóti is entitled „A Velencei Köztársaság halálára”.

== See also ==
- Fall of the Republic of Venice

== Sources ==
- Knight, William, ed. (1896). The Poetical Works of William Wordsworth. Vol. 2. London: Macmillan & Co., Ltd.
- MacGillivray, J. R. "On the Extinction of the Venetian Republic". RPO: Representative Poetry Online. University of Toronto Libraries. Retrieved 1 May 2022.
