= Leech collector =

Procurer of medicinal leeches

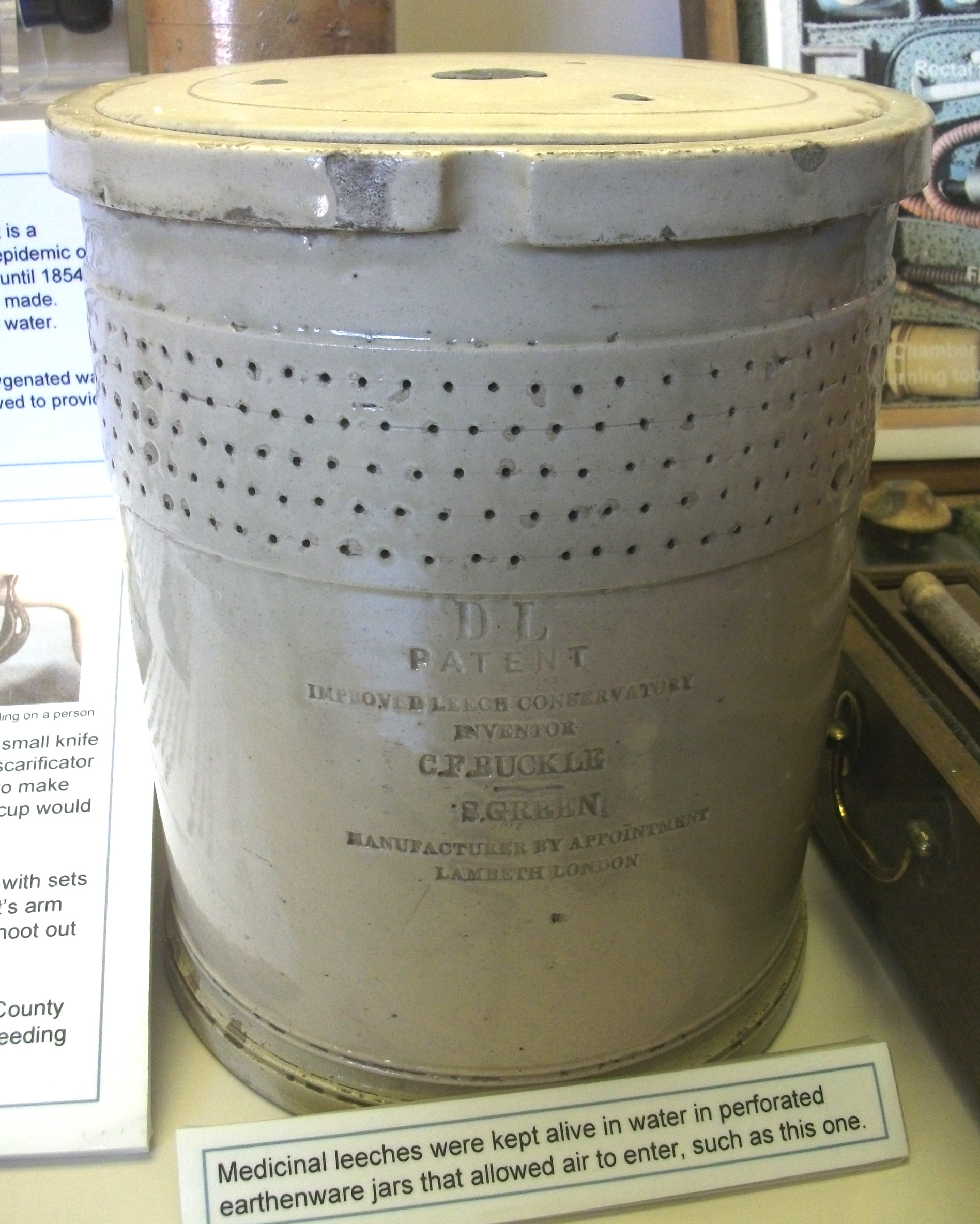
A jar for keeping medicinal leeches

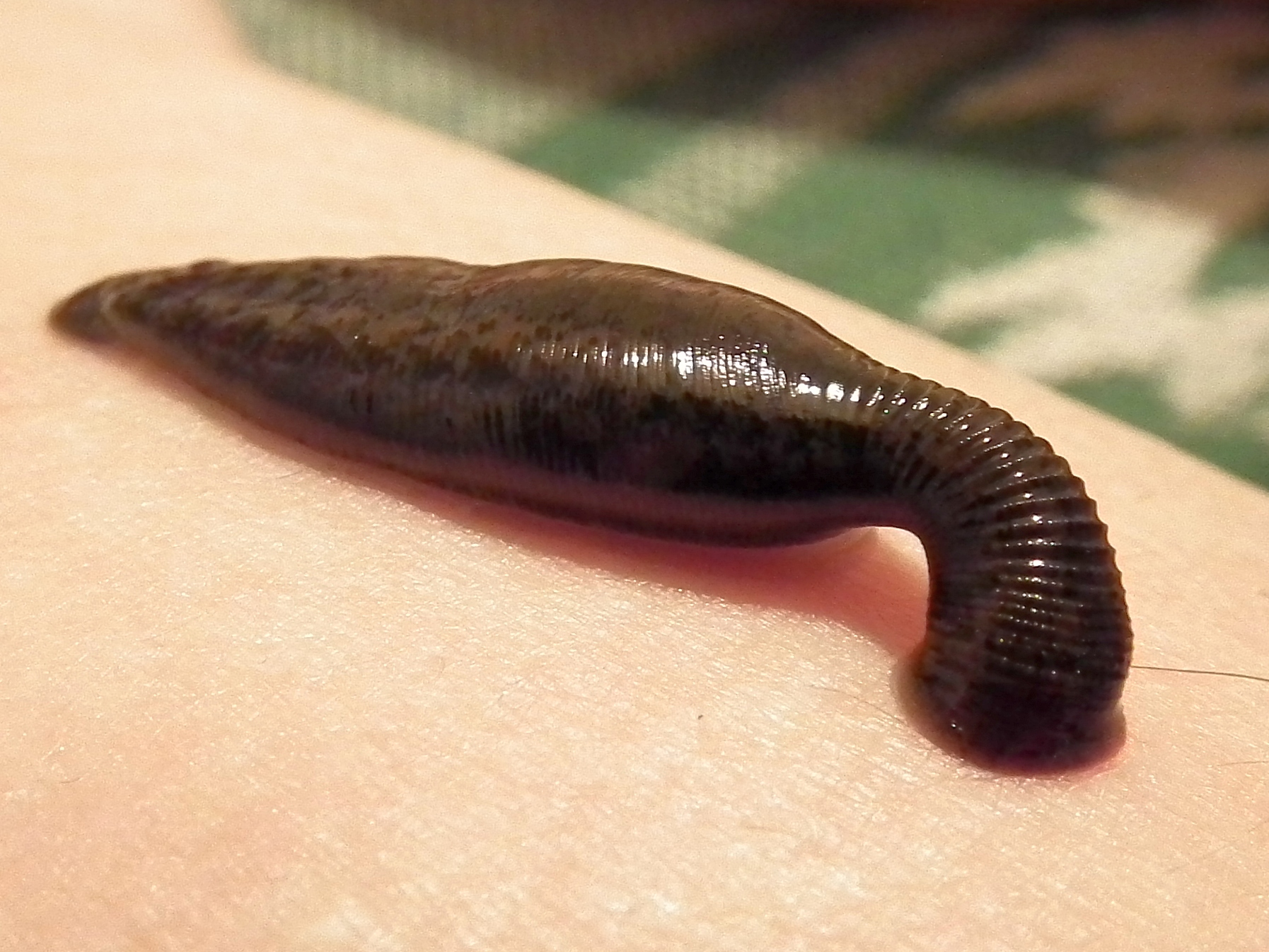
Hirudo medicinalis, a medicinal leech, attached to the skin

A leech collector, leech gatherer, or leech finder was a person occupied with procuring medicinal leeches, which were in growing demand in 19th-century Europe. Leeches were used in bloodletting but were not easy for medical practitioners to obtain. The collector would sometimes gather the leeches by attracting them to the legs of animals, often old horses. More commonplace was for the collector to use their own legs, gathering the leech after it had finished sucking enough blood. Many in the profession suffered from the effects of the loss of blood and infections spread by the leeches.

Leech collectors were active across the United Kingdom, with bogs and marshes being the best hunting ground. They were described by artist George Walker in his 1814 book The Costume of Yorkshire as being predominately Scottish women.

The career was seasonal; leech collectors could not work in the colder months because the leeches would not be particularly active.

There are obvious negative effects of being repeatedly bitten by leeches, most commonly the significant and dangerous levels of blood loss. The leeches would suck on the legs of the collector for 20 minutes or more, and even when they had finished, the resultant wound continued to bleed for up to ten hours.

Leech collectors were not well paid. William Wordsworth's poem Resolution and Independence, written in 1802 and published in 1807, was inspired by an encounter Wordsworth had with a "leech-gatherer". In Stanza XV he describes the hardships that the old, poor leech collector had endured:

He told, that to these waters he had come
To gather leeches, being old and poor:
Employment hazardous and wearisome!
And he had many hardships to endure:
From pond to pond he roamed, from moor to moor;
Housing, with God's good help, by choice or chance,

And in this way he gained an honest maintenance.

Parts of the poem have been interpreted as drawing similarities between leech collectors and poets, comparing the difficulties of finding leeches with the struggle to write poetry. The old man in the story is said to "have wisdom and fortitude that can elevate the wiser poet".

== Decline ==
Hirudo medicinalis, the only species of leech in Britain that can suck human blood, is identified as being "Near Threatened" by the IUCN. Their decline dates back to the time of the collectors and Wordsworth refers to the fall in their numbers in Resolution and Independence Stanza XVIII:

He with a smile did then his words repeat;
And said, that, gathering leeches, far and wide
He travelled; stirring thus about his feet
The waters of the pools where they abide.
"Once I could meet with them on every side;
But they have dwindled long by slow decay;

Yet still I persevere, and find them where I may."

The collection of leeches became a sizeable industry by the mid-19th century: 30 million were exported from Germany to America annually, and French imports of H. medicinalis in 1833 were in the region of 42 million. By the 1850s, leeches were difficult to find in Britain and other parts of Europe, and importing them from Central Asia made their use expensive.

By the turn of the 20th century, H. medicinalis had disappeared from most of Europe and was declared extinct in the British Isles, but they were rediscovered in parts of Great Britain from 1970 onwards. The dramatic drop in numbers was blamed partly on the over-collection of the species, but also on the dramatic reduction of their habitat. The largest population currently in Britain is believed to reside in the Romney Marsh.

The leech collecting industry also declined as the medicinal value of bloodletting and the use of leeches was questioned in the mid-to-late 19th century, under the influence of Rudolf Virchow's work on cellular processes and the eventual rise of the germ theory of disease.

Leeches are now used again in modern medicine, but they are not collected from the wild.
