= Harwich ferry disaster =

Incident at Felixstowe on the Essex coast of England

The 1807 Harwich ferry disaster was an incident that occurred at Landguard Fort, Felixstowe near the English sea port of Harwich on the Essex coast in the North Sea on Saturday 18 April 1807, in which sixty to ninety people drowned during the capsizing of a small ferry.

== Cause ==
The disaster was caused by the large number of army personnel and their families who wished to gain passage from Landguard Fort to Harwich at one time. Landguard Fort was a small army encampment on the coastline opposite Harwich town designed to protect the harbour from French and Dutch raiding parties during the Napoleonic Wars. Stationed at the fort were soldiers of the 79th Regiment of Foot, who would later become the Queen's Own Cameron Highlanders. This Scottish unit was accompanied by many of the soldiers' wives and families as well as local people attached to the camp. On the day of the disaster a company (military unit) of the regiment, accompanied by women and children, wished to take passage into Harwich, but the regular ferry was far too small to take such a large number of people. A local ship owner who possessed a small 18-ton coastal vessel heard about the predicament and offered to take the whole party at a low fare.

As the captain pushed off the beach near the fort, his grossly overladen vessel was hit by a sudden and strong gust of wind, which caught the sails and capsized the vessel, plunging the crew and passengers into the sea. Because many of the passengers could not swim and there was no passing shipping nearby, it was some time before rescuers could reach the site; by then only ten men were pulled alive from the sea. Regimental records record that 59 soldiers, the boat's crew, and the company's commander drowned. The number of women and children aboard is unknown, although records indicate it was significant. Many bodies were collected at sea and the beach the following day and identified and buried at the Landguard fort.

The tragedy was reported in The Times on 22 April 1807, and much comment was made at the time about the war record of the drowned men, as many of them had served in the British Egyptian Campaign of 1801 under General Sir Ralph Abercromby, where they had distinguished themselves in action.
