= The Solitary Reaper =

1807 ballad by William Wordsworth

- by William Wordsworth
- First published in: 1807
- Country: England
- Language: English
- Form: Ballad

Full text
- The Solitary Reaper at Wikisource

"The Solitary Reaper" is a lyric poem by English Romantic poet William Wordsworth, and one of his best-known works. The poem was inspired by his and his sister Dorothy's stay at the village of Strathyre in the parish of Balquhidder in Scotland in September 1803.

"The Solitary Reaper" is one of Wordsworth's most famous post-Lyrical Ballads lyrics. The words of the reaper's song are incomprehensible to the speaker, so his attention is free to focus on the tone, expressive beauty and the blissful mood it creates in him. The poem functions to "praise the beauty of music and its fluid expressive beauty", the "spontaneous overflow of powerful feelings: it takes its origin from emotion recollected in tranquility" that Wordsworth identified at the heart of poetry. The poet orders or requests his listeners to behold a young maiden reaping and singing to herself. The poet says that anyone passing by should either stop or gently pass as not to disturb her. There is a controversy however over the importance of the reaper along with Nature.

It was published in Poems, in Two Volumes in 1807.

== Summary ==
In this poem, the poet (William Wordsworth) tells us about a girl, a Highland lass, who is in a field alone: "single in the field". As she is harvesting her crops, she is singing a maybe sad tune which echoes in the deep valley. The poet is not very sure what the song is about but, because of the tune of the song he can predict the song is sad. The speaker asks us to stop and listen to her tune or "gently pass".

He tells us that no nightingale has sung a welcoming song to wanderers in the deserts. He goes on to say that a cuckoo bird, at its best, during springtime cannot hum a tune better. Her singing is the only sound breaking the silence in the Hebrides, a groups of islands off the coast of Scotland.

The poet has not a clue that, what this song is about or if it has a theme. Having no answer, he guesses it's about death or illness of a loved one, a war long ago, something mundane, or even some suffering. The poet wished for the song to not end as he listened to it standing there without motion and utmost tranquillity.
