= The World Is Too Much With Us =

Poem by William Wordsworth

The World Is Too Much With Us

The world is too much with us; late and soon,
Getting and spending we lay waste our powers;
Little we see in Nature that is ours;
We have given our hearts away, a sordid boon!
This Sea that bares her bosom to the moon,
The winds that will be howling at all hours,
And are up-gathered now like sleeping flowers,
For this, for everything, we are out of tune;
It moves us not. —Great God! I'd rather be
A Pagan suckled in a creed outworn;
So might I, standing on this pleasant lea,
Have glimpses that would make me less forlorn;
Have sight of Proteus rising from the sea;
Or hear old Triton blow his wreathèd horn.

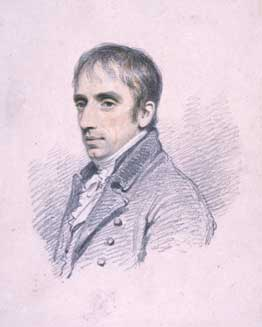
Wordsworth c. 1807

"The World Is Too Much With Us" is a sonnet by the English Romantic poet William Wordsworth. In it, Wordsworth criticises the world of the First Industrial Revolution for being absorbed in materialism and distancing itself from nature. Composed circa 1802, the poem was first published in Poems, in Two Volumes (1807).

== Theme ==
In the early nineteenth century, Wordsworth wrote several sonnets lambasting what he perceived as "the decadent material cynicism of the time". "The World Is Too Much With Us" is one of those works. It reflects a sense of personal despair as well as an understanding of the power of nature. The rhyme scheme of the poem is ABBA ABBA CDCD CD. This Italian or Petrarchan sonnet uses the last six lines (sestet) to answer the first eight lines (octave). The octave presents the problems and the sestet presents the solutions.

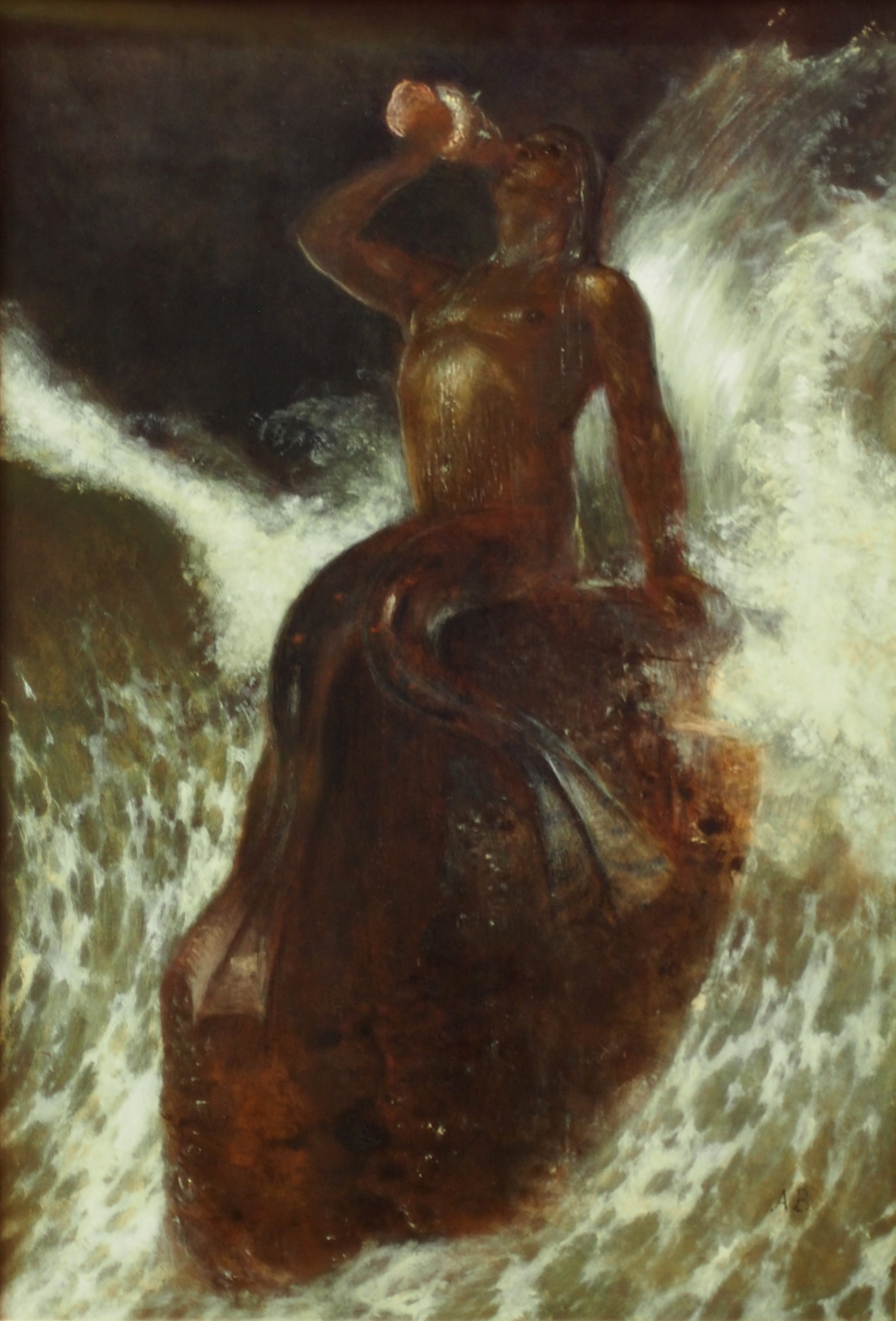
Triton blowing his conch (Arnold Böcklin, 1879)

In the sestet, the poet imagines believing in gods like Proteus and Triton rather than being Christian, despite seeing paganism as "a creed outworn", because he thinks that life would be more meaningful that way.

== See also ==
- Leisure (poem) § Appraisal
