= Elegiac Stanzas =

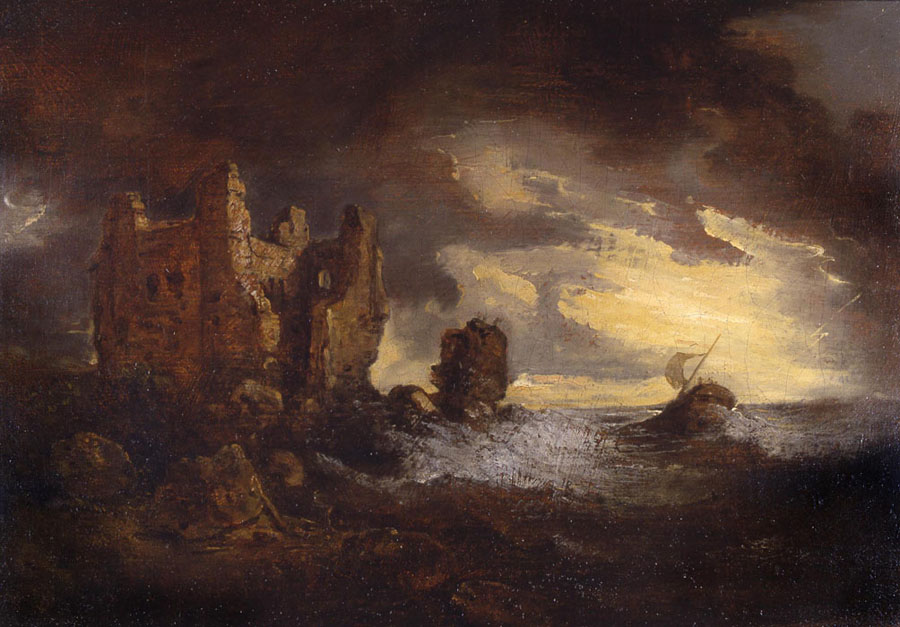
The painting by Sir George Beaumont which inspired the poem.

"Elegiac Stanzas" is a poem by William Wordsworth, originally published in Poems, in Two Volumes (1807). Its full title is "Elegiac Stanzas, Suggested by a Picture of Peele Castle, in a Storm, Painted by Sir George Beaumont."
