= My Heart Leaps Up =

Wordsworth poem published in 1807

My Heart Leaps Up When I Behold

My heart leaps up when I behold
A rainbow in the sky:
So was it when my life began;
So is it now I am a man;
So be it when I shall grow old,
Or let me die!
The Child is father of the Man;
And I could wish my days to be
Bound each to each by natural piety.

"My Heart Leaps Up", also known as "The Rainbow", is a poem by the British Romantic poet William Wordsworth published in 1807. Noted for its simple structure and language, it describes joy felt at viewing a rainbow.

== Writing the poem ==
Wordsworth wrote "My Heart Leaps Up" on the night of March 26, 1802. He was staying at Dove Cottage in Grasmere with his sister, Dorothy. After he wrote it, he often thought about altering it, but decided to leave it as it was originally written. It was first published in Poems, in Two Volumes in 1807.

The day after he wrote "My Heart Leaps Up", Wordsworth began to write his more ambitious "Ode: Intimations of Immortality". The last three lines from "My Heart Leaps Up" are used as part of the epigraph to "Intimations of Immortality". "My Heart Leaps Up" may indicate Wordsworth's state of mind while writing the larger poem and provide insight into interpreting the latter.

== Critical analysis ==
Some commentators have speculated that Wordsworth felt such joy because the rainbow indicates the constancy of his connection to nature; he was 32 years of age when he wrote the poem. Others have said that it celebrates "the continuity in Wordsworth's consciousness of self".

Other literary analysis draws parallels to the rainbow of Noah, and the covenant it symbolized, see Genesis 6:9–11:32. Wordsworth's use of the phrase "bound each to each" in the poem also implies the presence of a covenant. Harold Bloom expanded on the idea, suggesting that Wordsworth casts the rainbow as a symbol of the survival of his poetic gift, just as the rainbow symbolized to Noah the survival of mankind. In other words, Bloom suggests that Wordsworth's poetic gift relied on his ability to recall the memories of his joy as a child.

William Blake disliked Wordsworth's use of the phrase "natural piety". Blake believed that man was naturally impious and therefore Wordsworth's phrase contradicted itself.

Because a rainbow is shaped like an arc of a circle, Fred Blick speculates that the word ‘piety’ at the end of the last line is a deliberate geometrical pun in the word pi, signaled by the phrase ‘bound each to each’. It would thus symbolize continuity. Wordsworth loved geometry and may have been making the same pun on ‘piety’ when he used the word at least twice elsewhere.

== In popular culture ==
"The child is the father of the man" is the title of a chapter in Machado de Assis's 1881 novel The Posthumous Memoirs of Brás Cubas. The quote was also paraphrased by Cormac McCarthy in the first page of his 1985 novel Blood Meridian as "the child the father of the man."

The Beach Boys' songs "Surf's Up" (1971) and "Child Is Father of the Man" (2011) quote the poem. Blood, Sweat & Tears named their 1968 studio album Child Is Father to the Man.

== See also ==
- Anecdote for Fathers by Wordsworth

== Bibliography ==
- Bloom, Harold (2001), How to Read and Why, New York: Touchstone, ISBN 978-0-684-85907-1
- Wordsworth, William (1898), Dowden, Edward (ed.), Poems by William Wordsworth, New York: Ginn & Company
- Moore, Kevin (1990), The Descent of the Imagination, New York City: New York University Press, ISBN 978-0-8147-5451-1
- Twitchell, James (September 2004), "An English Teacher Looks at Branding", The Journal of Consumer Research, 31 (2), The University of Chicago Press: 484–489, doi:10.1086/422125
