= Ode: Intimations of Immortality =

Poem by William Wordsworth

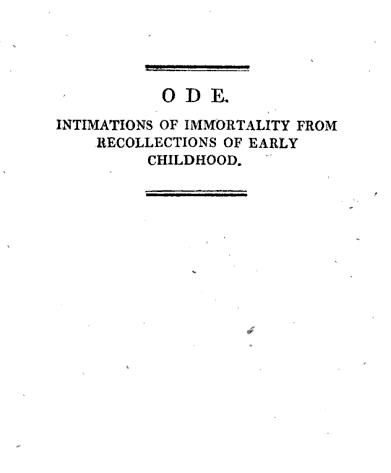
Poem's title page from 1815 collection of Poems

"Ode: Intimations of Immortality from Recollections of Early Childhood" (also known as "Ode", "Immortality Ode" or "Great Ode") is a poem by William Wordsworth, completed in 1804 and published in Poems, in Two Volumes (1807). The poem was completed in two parts, with the first four stanzas written among a series of poems composed in 1802 about childhood. The first part of the poem was completed on 27 March 1802 and a copy was provided to Wordsworth's friend and fellow poet, Samuel Taylor Coleridge, who responded with his own poem, "Dejection: An Ode", in April. The fourth stanza of the ode ends with a question, and Wordsworth was finally able to answer it with seven additional stanzas completed in early 1804. It was first printed as "Ode" in 1807, and it was not until 1815 that it was edited and reworked to the version that is currently known, "Ode: Intimations of Immortality".

The poem is an irregular Pindaric ode in 11 stanzas that combines aspects of Coleridge's Conversation poems, the religious sentiments of the Bible and the works of Saint Augustine, and aspects of the elegiac and apocalyptic traditions. It is split into three movements: the first four stanzas discuss death, and the loss of youth and innocence; the second four stanzas describe how age causes man to lose sight of the divine, and the final three stanzas express hope that the memory of the divine will allow us to sympathise with our fellow man. The poem relies on the concept of pre-existence, the idea that the soul existed before the body, to connect children with the ability to witness the divine within nature. As children mature, they become more worldly and lose this divine vision, and the ode reveals Wordsworth's understanding of psychological development that is also found in his poems The Prelude and Tintern Abbey. Wordsworth's praise of the child as the "best philosopher" was criticised by Coleridge and became the source of later critical discussion.

Modern critics sometimes have referred to Wordsworth's poem as the "Great Ode" and ranked it among his best poems, but this was not always the case. Contemporary reviews of the poem were mixed, with many reviewers attacking the work or, like Lord Byron, dismissing the work without analysis. The critics felt that Wordsworth's subject matter was too "low" and some felt that the emphasis on childhood was misplaced. Among the Romantic poets, most praised various aspects of the poem however. By the Victorian period, most reviews of the ode were positive with only John Ruskin taking a strong negative stance against the poem. The poem continued to be well received into the 20th century, with few exceptions. The majority ranked it as one of Wordsworth's greatest poems.

== Background ==
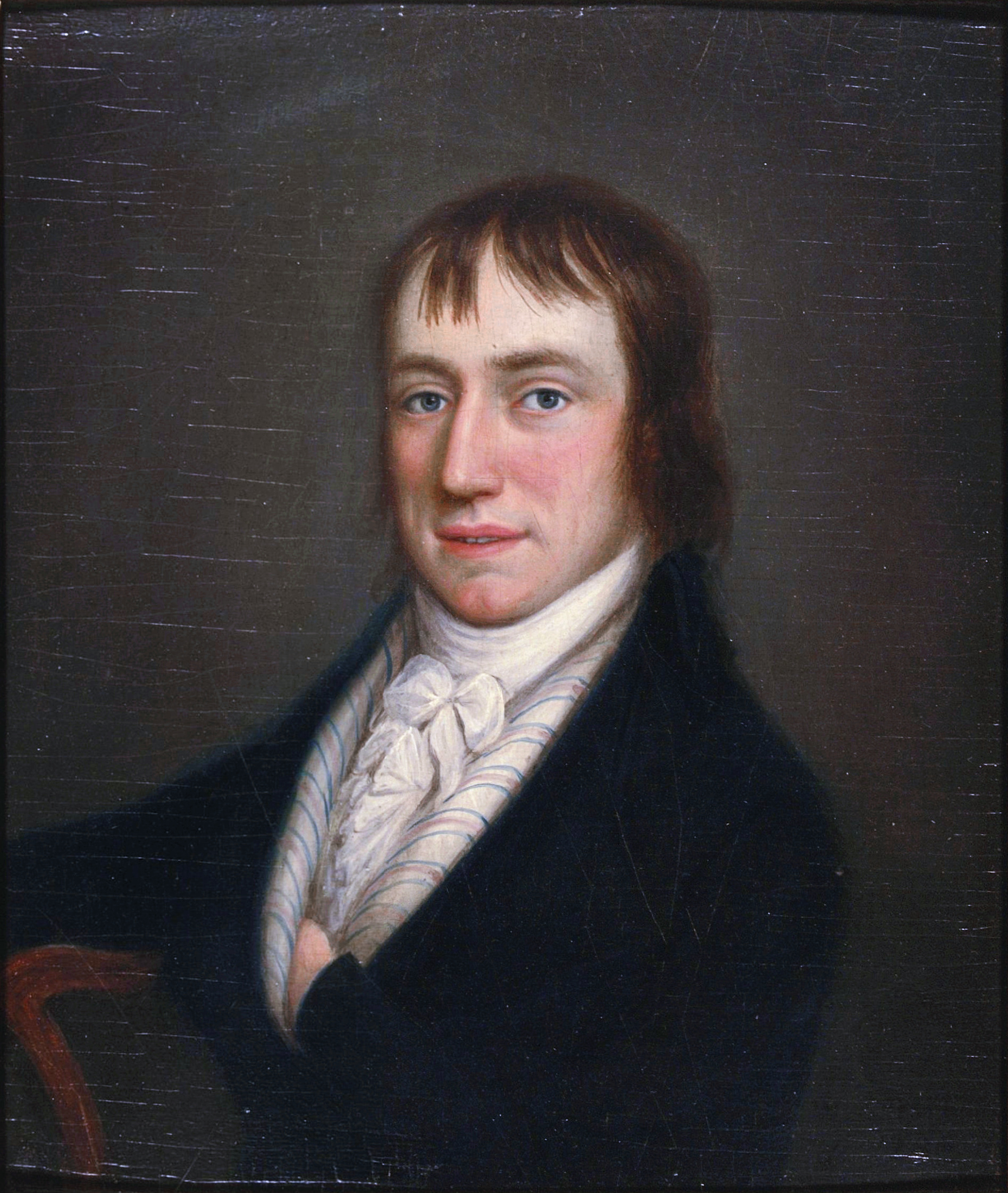
Wordsworth at the age of 28

A divine morning – at Breakfast Wm wrote part of an ode – Mr Olliff sent the Dung & Wm went to work in the garden we sate all day in the Orchard.

— Dorothy Wordsworth, The Grasmere Journal, Saturday 27 March 1802

In 1802, Wordsworth wrote many poems that dealt with his youth. These poems were partly inspired by his conversations with his sister, Dorothy, whom he was living with in the Lake District at the time. The poems, beginning with "The Butterfly" and ending with "To the Cuckoo", were all based on Wordsworth's recalling both the sensory and emotional experience of his childhood. From "To the Cuckoo", he moved on to "The Rainbow", both written on 26 March 1802, and then on to "Ode: Intimation of Immortality from Recollections of Early Childhood". As he moved from poem to poem, he began to question why, as a child, he once was able to see an immortal presence within nature but as an adult that was fading away except in the few moments he was able to meditate on experiences found in poems like "To the Cuckoo". While sitting at breakfast on 27 March, he began to compose the ode. He was able to write four stanzas that put forth the question about the faded image and ended, "Where is it now, the glory and the dream?" The poem would remain in its smaller, four-stanza version until 1804.

The short version of the ode was possibly finished in one day because Wordsworth left the next day to spend time with Samuel Taylor Coleridge in Keswick. Close to the time Wordsworth and Coleridge climbed the Skiddaw mountain, 3 April 1802, Wordsworth recited the four stanzas of the ode that were completed. The poem impressed Coleridge, and, while with Wordsworth, he was able to provide his response to the ode's question within an early draft of his poem, "Dejection: An Ode". In early 1804, Wordsworth was able to return his attention to working on the ode. It was a busy beginning of the year with Wordsworth having to help Dorothy recover from an illness in addition to writing his poems. The exact time of composition is unknown, but it probably followed his work on The Prelude, which consumed much of February and was finished on 17 March. Many of the lines of the ode are similar to the lines of The Prelude Book V, and he used the rest of the ode to try to answer the question at the end of the fourth stanza.

The poem was first printed in full for Wordsworth's 1807 collection of poems, Poems, in Two Volumes, under the title "Ode". It was the last poem of the second volume of the work, and it had its own title page separating it from the rest of the poems, including the previous poem "Peele Castle". Wordsworth added an epigraph just before publication, "paulò majora canamus". The Latin phrase is from Virgil's Eclogue 4, meaning "let us sing a somewhat loftier song". The poem was reprinted under its full title "Ode: Intimation of Immortality from Recollections of Early Childhood" for Wordsworth's collection Poems (1815). The reprinted version also contained an epigraph that, according to Henry Crabb Robinson, was added at Crabb's suggestion. The epigraph was from "My Heart Leaps Up". In 1820, Wordsworth issued The Miscellaneous Poems of William Wordsworth that collected the poems he wished to be preserved with an emphasis on ordering the poems, revising the text, and including prose that would provide the theory behind the text. The ode was the final poem of the fourth and final book, and it had its own title-page, suggesting that it was intended as the poem that would serve to represent the completion of his poetic abilities. The 1820 version also had some revisions, including the removal of lines 140 and 141.

== Styles ==
The poem uses an irregular form of the Pindaric ode in 11 stanzas. The lengths of the lines and of the stanzas vary throughout the text, and the poem begins with an iambic meter. The irregularities increase throughout the poem and Stanza IX lacks a regular form before being replaced with a march-like meter in the final two stanzas. The poem also contains multiple enjambments and there is a use of an ABAB rhyme scheme that gives the poem a singsong quality. By the end of the poem, the rhymes start to become as irregular in a similar way to the meter, and the irregular Stanza IX closes with an iambic couplet. The purpose of the change in rhythm, rhyme, and style is to match the emotions expressed in the poem as it develops from idea to idea. The narration of the poem is in the style of an interior monologue, and there are many aspects of the poem that connect it to Coleridge's style of poetry called "Conversation poems", especially the poem's reliance on a one sided discussion that expects a response that never comes. There is also a more traditional original of the discussion style of the poem, as many of the prophetic aspects of the poem are related to the Old Testament of the Bible. Additionally, the reflective and questioning aspects are similar to the Psalms and the works of Saint Augustine, and the ode contains what is reminiscent of Hebrew prayer.

In terms of genre, the poem is an ode, which makes it a poem that is both prayer and contains a celebration of its subject. However, this celebration is mixed with questioning and this hinders the continuity of the poem. The poem is also related to the elegy in that it mourns the loss of childhood vision, and the title page of the 1807 edition emphasises the influence of Virgil's Eclogue 4. Wordsworth's use of the elegy, in his poems including the "Lucy" poems, parts of The Excursion, and others, focus on individuals that protect themselves from a sense of loss by turning to nature or time. He also rejects any kind of fantasy that would take him away from reality while accepting both death and the loss of his own abilities to time while mourning over the loss. However, the elegy is traditionally a private poem while Wordsworth's ode is more public in nature. The poem is also related to the genre of apocalyptic writing in that it focuses on what is seen or the lack of sight. Such poems emphasise the optical sense and were common to many poems written by the Romantic poets, including his own poem The Ruined Cottage, Coleridge's "Dejection: An Ode" and Rime of the Ancient Mariner and Percy Bysshe Shelley's "Hymn to Intellectual Beauty" and "The Zucca".

== Poem ==
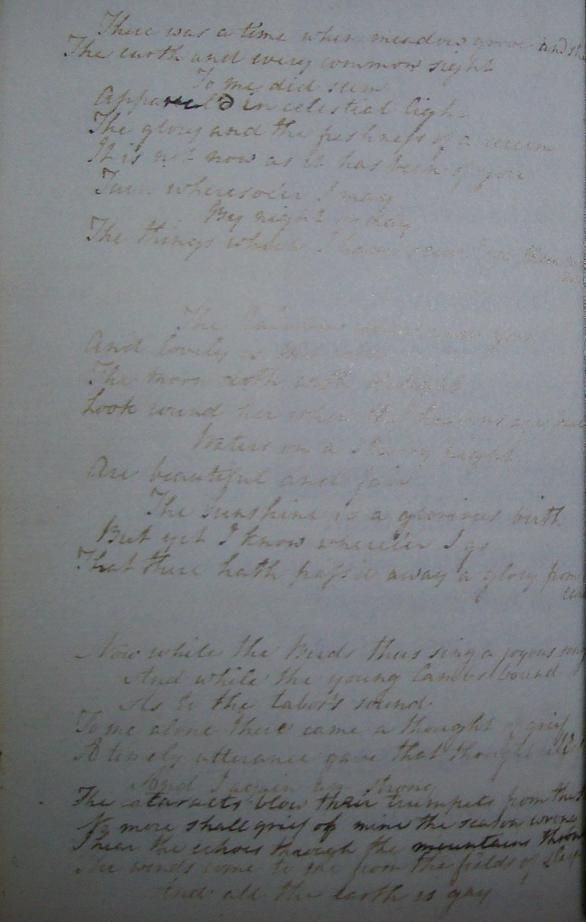
1804 holograph copy of Stanza I–III by Mary Wordsworth

The ode contains 11 stanzas split into three movements. The first movement is four stanzas long and discusses the narrator's inability to see the divine glory of nature, the problem of the poem. The second movement is four stanzas long and has a negative response to the problem. The third movement is three stanzas long and contains a positive response to the problem. The ode begins by contrasting the narrator's view of the world as a child and as a man, with what was once a life interconnected to the divine fading away:

There was a time when meadow, grove, and stream,
The earth, and every common sight,
To me did seem
Apparelled in celestial light,
The glory and the freshness of a dream.
It is not now as it hath been of yore;—
Turn wheresoe'er I may,
By night or day,
The things which I have seen I now can see no more. (lines 1–9)

In the second and third stanzas, the narrator continues by describing his surroundings and various aspects of nature that he is no longer able to feel. He feels as if he is separated from the rest of nature until he experiences a moment that brings about feelings of joy that are able to overcome his despair:

To me alone there came a thought of grief:
A timely utterance gave that thought relief,
And I again am strong:
The cataracts blow their trumpets from the steep;
No more shall grief of mine the season wrong; (lines 22–26)

The joy in stanza III slowly fades again in stanza IV as the narrator feels like there is "something that is gone". As the stanza ends, the narrator asks two different questions to end the first movement of the poem. Though they appear to be similar, one asks where the visions are now ("Where is it now") while the other doesn't ("Whither is fled"), and they leave open the possibility that the visions could return:

A single Field which I have looked upon,
Both of them speak of something that is gone:
The Pansy at my feet
Doth the same tale repeat:
Whither is fled the visionary gleam?
Where is it now, the glory and the dream? (lines 52–57)

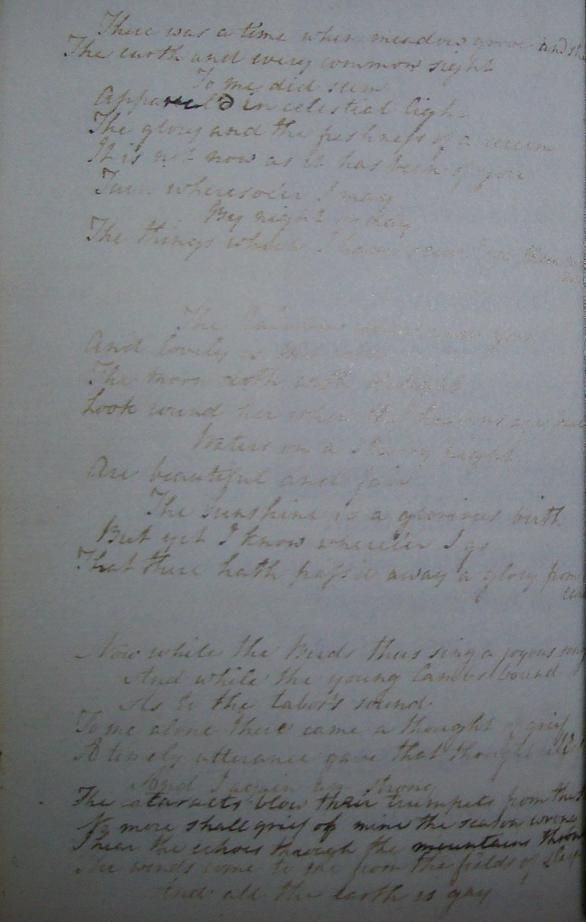
1804 holograph copy of Stanza III-V by Mary Wordsworth

The second movement begins in stanza V by answering the question of stanza IV by describing a Platonic system of pre-existence. The narrator explains how humans start in an ideal world that slowly fades into a shadowy life:

Our birth is but a sleep and a forgetting:
The Soul that rises with us, our life's Star,
Hath had elsewhere its setting,
And cometh from afar:
Not in entire forgetfulness,
And not in utter nakedness,
But trailing clouds of glory do we come
From God, who is our home:
Heaven lies about us in our infancy!
Shades of the prison-house begin to close
Upon the growing Boy,
But He beholds the light, and whence it flows,
He sees it in his joy; (lines 58–70)

Before the light fades away as the child matures, the narrator emphasises the greatness of the child experiencing the feelings. By the beginning of stanza VIII, the child is described as a great individual, and the stanza is written in the form of a prayer that praises the attributes of children:

Thou, whose exterior semblance doth belie
Thy Soul's immensity;
Thou best Philosopher, who yet dost keep
Thy heritage, thou Eye among the blind,
That, deaf and silent, read'st the eternal deep,
Haunted for ever by the eternal mind, —
Mighty Prophet! Seer blest!
On whom those truths do rest,
Which we are toiling all our lives to find,
In darkness lost, the darkness of the grave; (lines 108–117)

The end of stanza VIII brings about the end of a second movement within the poem. The glories of nature are only described as existing in the past, and the child's understanding of mortality is already causing them to lose what they once had:

Full soon thy Soul shall have her earthly freight,
And custom lie upon thee with a weight,
Heavy as frost, and deep almost as life! (lines 129–131)

The questions in Stanza IV are answered with words of despair in the second movement, but the third movement is filled with joy. Stanza IX contains a mixture of affirmation of life and faith as it seemingly avoids discussing what is lost. The stanza describes how a child is able to see what others do not see because children do not comprehend mortality, and the imagination allows an adult to intimate immortality and bond with his fellow man:

Hence in a season of calm weather
Though inland far we be,
Our Souls have sight of that immortal sea
Which brought us hither,
Can in a moment travel thither,
And see the Children sport upon the shore,
And hear the mighty waters rolling evermore. (lines 164–170)

The children on the shore represent the adult narrator's recollection of childhood, and the recollection allows for an intimation of returning to that mental state. In stanza XI, the imagination allows one to know that there are limits to the world, but it also allows for a return to a state of sympathy with the world lacking any questions or concerns:

The Clouds that gather round the setting sun
Do take a sober colouring from an eye
That hath kept watch o'er man's mortality;
Another race hath been, and other palms are won. (lines 199–202)

The poem concludes with an affirmation that, though changed by time, the narrator is able to be the same person he once was:

Thanks to the human heart by which we live,
Thanks to its tenderness, its joys, and fears,
To me the meanest flower that blows can give
Thoughts that do often lie too deep for tears. (lines 203–206)

== Themes ==
The first version of the ode is similar to many of Wordsworth's spring 1802 poems. The ode is like To the Cuckoo in that both poems discuss aspects of nature common to the end of spring. Both poems were crafted at times when the natural imagery could not take place, so Wordsworth had to rely on his imagination to determine the scene. Wordsworth refers to "A timely utterance" in the third stanza, possibly the same event found in his The Rainbow, and the ode contains feelings of regret that the experience must end. This regret is joined with feelings of uneasiness that he no longer feels the same way he did as a boy. The ode reflects Wordsworth's darker feelings that he could no longer return to a peaceful state with nature. This gloomy feeling is also present in The Ruined Cottage and in Tintern Abbey. Of the other 1802 poems, the ode is different from his Resolution and Independence, a poem that describes the qualities needed to become a great poet. The poem argued that a poet should not be excessive or irresponsible in behaviour and contains a sense of assurance that is not found within the original four stanzas. Instead, there is a search for such a feeling but the poem ends without certainty, which relates the ode to Coleridge's poem Dejection: An Ode. When read together, Coleridge's and Wordsworth's poem form a dialogue with an emphasis on the poet's relationship with nature and humanity. However, Wordsworth's original four stanzas describing a loss is made darker in Coleridge and, to Coleridge, only humanity and love are able to help the poet.

While with Wordsworth, Coleridge was able to read the poem and provide his response to the ode's question within an early draft of his poem, Dejection: an Ode. Coleridge's answer was to claim that the glory was the soul and it is a subjective answer to the question. Wordsworth took a different path as he sought to answer the poem, which was to declare that childhood contained the remnants of a beatific state and that being able to experience the beauty that remained later was something to be thankful for. The difference between the two could be attributed to the differences in the poets' childhood experiences; Coleridge suffered from various pain in his youth whereas Wordsworth's was far more pleasant. It is possible that Coleridge's earlier poem, The Mad Monk (1800) influenced the opening of the ode and that discussions between Dorothy and Wordsworth about Coleridge's childhood and painful life were influences on the crafting of the opening stanza of the poem. However, the message in the ode, as with Tintern Abbey, describes the pain and suffering of life as able to dull the memory of early joy from nature but it is unable to completely destroy it. The suffering leads Wordsworth to recognise what is soothing in nature, and he credits the pain as leading to a philosophical understanding of the world.

The poem is similar to the conversation poems created by Coleridge, including Dejection: An Ode. The poems were not real conversations as there is no response to the narrator of the poem, but they are written as if there would be a response. The poems seek to have a response, though it never comes, and the possibility of such a voice though absence is a type of prosopopoeia. In general, Coleridge's poems discuss the cosmic as they long for a response, and it is this aspect, not a possible object of the conversation, that forms the power of the poem. Wordsworth took up the form in both Tintern Abbey and Ode: Intimations of Immortality, but he lacks the generous treatment of the narrator as found in Coleridge's poems. As a whole, Wordsworth's technique is impersonal and more logical, and the narrator is placed in the same position as the object of the conversation. The narrator of Wordsworth is more self-interested and any object beyond the narrator is kept without a possible voice and is turned into a second self of the poet. As such, the conversation has one of the participants lose his identity for the sake of the other and that individual represents loss and mortality.

=== Pre-existence ===
The expanded portion of the ode is related to the ideas expressed in Wordsworth's The Prelude Book V in their emphasis on childhood memories and a connection between the divine and humanity. To Wordsworth, the soul was created by the divine and was able to recognise the light in the world. As a person ages, they are no longer able to see the light, but they can still recognise the beauty in the world. He elaborated on this belief in a note to the text: "Archimedes said that he could move the world if he had a point whereon to rest his machine. Who has not felt the same aspirations as regards the world of his own mind? Having to wield some of its elements when I was impelled to write this poem on the "Immortality of the Soul", I took hold of the notion of pre-existence as having sufficient foundation in humanity for authorising me to make for my purpose the best use I could of it as a Poet." This "notion of pre-existence" is somewhat Platonic in nature, and it is the basis for Wordsworth believing that children are able to be the "best philosopher". The idea was not intended as a type of metempsychosis, the reincarnation of the soul from person to person, and Wordsworth later explained that the poem was not meant to be regarded as a complete philosophical view: "In my Ode... I do not profess to give a literal representation of the state of the affections and of the moral being in childhood. I record my feelings at that time,--my absolute spirituality, my 'all-soulness,' if I may so speak. At that time I could not believe that I should lie down quietly in the grave, and that my body would moulder into dust."

Wordsworth's explanation of the origin of the poem suggests that it was inspiration and passion that led to the ode's composition, and he later said that the poem was to deal with the loss of sensations and a desire to overcome the natural process of death. As for the specific passages in the poem that answer the question of the early version, two of the stanzas describe what it is like to be a child in a similar manner to his earlier poem, "To Hartley Coleridge, Six Years Old" dedicated to Coleridge's son. In the previous poem, the subject was Hartley's inability to understand death as an end to life or a separation. In the ode, the child is Wordsworth and, like Hartley or the girl described in "We are Seven", he too was unable to understand death and that inability is transformed into a metaphor for childish feelings. The later stanzas also deal with personal feelings but emphasise Wordsworth's appreciation for being able to experience the spiritual parts of the world and a desire to know what remains after the passion of childhood sensations are gone. This emphasis of the self places mankind in the position of the object of prayer, possibly replacing a celebration of Christ's birth with a celebration of his own as the poem describes mankind coming from the eternal down to earth. Although this emphasis seems non-Christian, many of the poem's images are Judeo-Christian in origin. Additionally, the Platonic theory of pre-existence is related to the Christian understanding of the Incarnation, which is a connection that Shelley drops when he reuses many of Wordsworth's ideas in The Triumph of Life.

The idea of pre-existence within the poem contains only a limited theological component, and Wordsworth later believed that the concept was "far too shadowy a notion to be recommended to faith." In 1989, Gene Ruoff argued that the idea was connected to Christian theology in that the Christian theorist Origen adopted the belief and relied on it in the development of Christian doctrine. What is missing in Origen's platonic system is Wordsworth's emphasis on childhood, which could be found in the beliefs of the Cambridge Platonists and their works, including Henry Vaughan's "The Retreate". Even if the idea is not Christian, it still cannot be said that the poem lacks a theological component because the poem incorporates spiritual images of natural scenes found in childhood. Among those natural scenes, the narrator includes a Hebrew prayer-like praise of God for the restoration of the soul to the body in the morning and the attributing of God's blessing to the various animals he sees. What concerns the narrator is that he is not being renewed like the animals and he is fearful over what he is missing. This is similar to a fear that is provided at the beginning of The Prelude and in Tintern Abbey. As for the understanding of the soul contained within the poem, Wordsworth is more than Platonic in that he holds an Augustinian concept of mercy that leads to the progress of the soul. Wordsworth differs from Augustine in that Wordsworth seeks in the poem to separate himself from the theory of solipsism, the belief that nothing exists outside of the mind. The soul, over time, exists in a world filled with the sublime before moving to the natural world, and the man moves from an egocentric world to a world with nature and then to a world with mankind. This system links nature with a renewal of the self.

=== Childhood and growth ===
Ode: Intimations of Immortality is about childhood, but the poem doesn't completely focus on childhood or what was lost from childhood. Instead, the ode, like The Prelude and Tintern Abbey, places an emphasis on how an adult develops from a child and how being absorbed in nature inspires a deeper connection to humanity. The ode focuses not on Dorothy or on Wordsworth's love, Mary Hutchinson, but on himself and is part of what is called his "egotistical sublime". Of his childhood, Wordsworth told Catherine Clarkson in an 1815 letter that the poem "rests entirely upon two recollections of childhood, one that of a splendour in the objects of sense which is passed away, and the other an indisposition to bend to the law of death as applying to our particular case.... A Reader who has not a vivid recollection of these feelings having existed in his mind in childhood cannot understand the poem." Childhood, therefore, becomes a means to exploring memory, and the imagination, as Wordsworth claims in the letter, is connected to man's understanding of immortality. In a letter to Isabella Fenwick, he explained his particular feelings about immortality that he held when young: "I was often unable to think of external things as having external existence, and I communed with all that I saw as something not apart from, but inherent in, my own immaterial nature." These feelings were influenced by Wordsworth's own experience of loss, including the death of his parents, and may have isolated him from society if the feelings did not ease as he matured.

Like the two other poems, The Prelude and Tintern Abbey, the ode discusses Wordsworth's understanding of his own psychological development, but it is not a scientific study of the subject. He believed that it is difficult to understand the soul and emphasises the psychological basis of his visionary abilities, an idea found in the ode but in the form of a lamentation for the loss of vision. To Wordsworth, vision is found in childhood but is lost later, and there are three types of people that lose their vision. The first are men corrupted through either an apathetic view of the visions or through meanness of mind. The second are the "common" people who lose their vision as a natural part of ageing. The last, the gifted, lose parts of their vision, and all three retain at least a limited ability to experience visions. Wordsworth sets up multiple stages, infancy, childhood, adolescence, and maturity as times of development but there is no real boundary between each stage. To Wordsworth, infancy is when the "poetic spirit", the ability to experience visions, is first developed and is based on the infant learning about the world and bonding to nature. As the child goes through adolescence, he continues to bond with nature and this is slowly replaced by a love for humanity, a concept known as "One Life". This leads to the individual despairing and only being able to resist despair through imagination. When describing the stages of human life, one of the images Wordsworth relies on to describe the negative aspects of development is a theatre stage, the Latin idea of theatrum mundi. The idea allows the narrator to claim that people are weighed down by the roles they play over time. The narrator is also able to claim through the metaphor that people are disconnected from reality and see life as if in a dream.

Wordsworth returns to the ideas found within the complete ode many times in his later works. There is also a strong connection between the ode and Wordsworth's Ode to Duty, completed at the same time in 1804. The poems describe Wordsworth's assessment of his poetry and contains reflections on conversations held between Wordsworth and Coleridge on poetry and philosophy. The basis of the Ode to Duty states that love and happiness are important to life, but there is something else necessary to connect an individual to nature, affirming the narrator's loyalty to a benevolent divine presence in the world. However, Wordsworth was never satisfied with the result of Ode to Duty as he was with Ode: Intimations of Immortality. In terms of use of light as a central image, the ode is related to Peele Castle, but the light in the latter poem is seen as an illusion and stands in opposition to the ode's ideas. In an 1809 essay as part of his Essays upon Epitaphs for Coleridge's journal, The Friend, Wordsworth argued that people have intimations that there is an immortal aspect of their life and that without such feelings that joy could not be felt in the world. The argument and the ideas are similar to many of the statements in the ode along with those in The Prelude, Tintern Abbey, and "We Are Seven". He would also return directly to the ode in his 1817 poem Composed upon an Evening of Extraordinary Splendor and Beauty where he evaluates his own evolving life and poetic works while discussing the loss of an early vision of the world's joys. In the Ode: Intimations of Immortality, Wordsworth concluded that he gives thanks that was able to gain even though he lost his vision of the joy in the world, but in the later work he tones down his emphasis on the gain and provides only a muted thanks for what remains of his ability to see the glory in the world.

Wordsworth's ode is a poem that describes how suffering allows for growth and an understanding of nature, and this belief influenced the poetry of other Romantic poets. Wordsworth followed a Virgilian idea called lacrimae rerum, which means that "life is growth" but it implies that there is also loss within life. To Wordsworth, the loss brought about enough to make up for what was taken. Shelley, in his Prometheus Unbound, describes a reality that would be the best that could be developed but always has the suffering, death, and change. John Keats developed an idea called "the Burden of the Mystery" that emphasizes the importance of suffering in the development of man and necessary for maturation. However, Coleridge's Dejection: An Ode describes the loss of his own poetic ability as he aged and mourned what time took. In Coleridge's theory, his poetic abilities were the basis for happiness and without them there would only be misery. In addition to views on suffering, Shelley relies on Wordsworth's idea of pre-existence in The Triumph of Life, and Keats relies on Wordsworth's interrogative technique in many of his poems, but he discards the egocentric aspects of the questions.

=== Coleridge's analysis ===
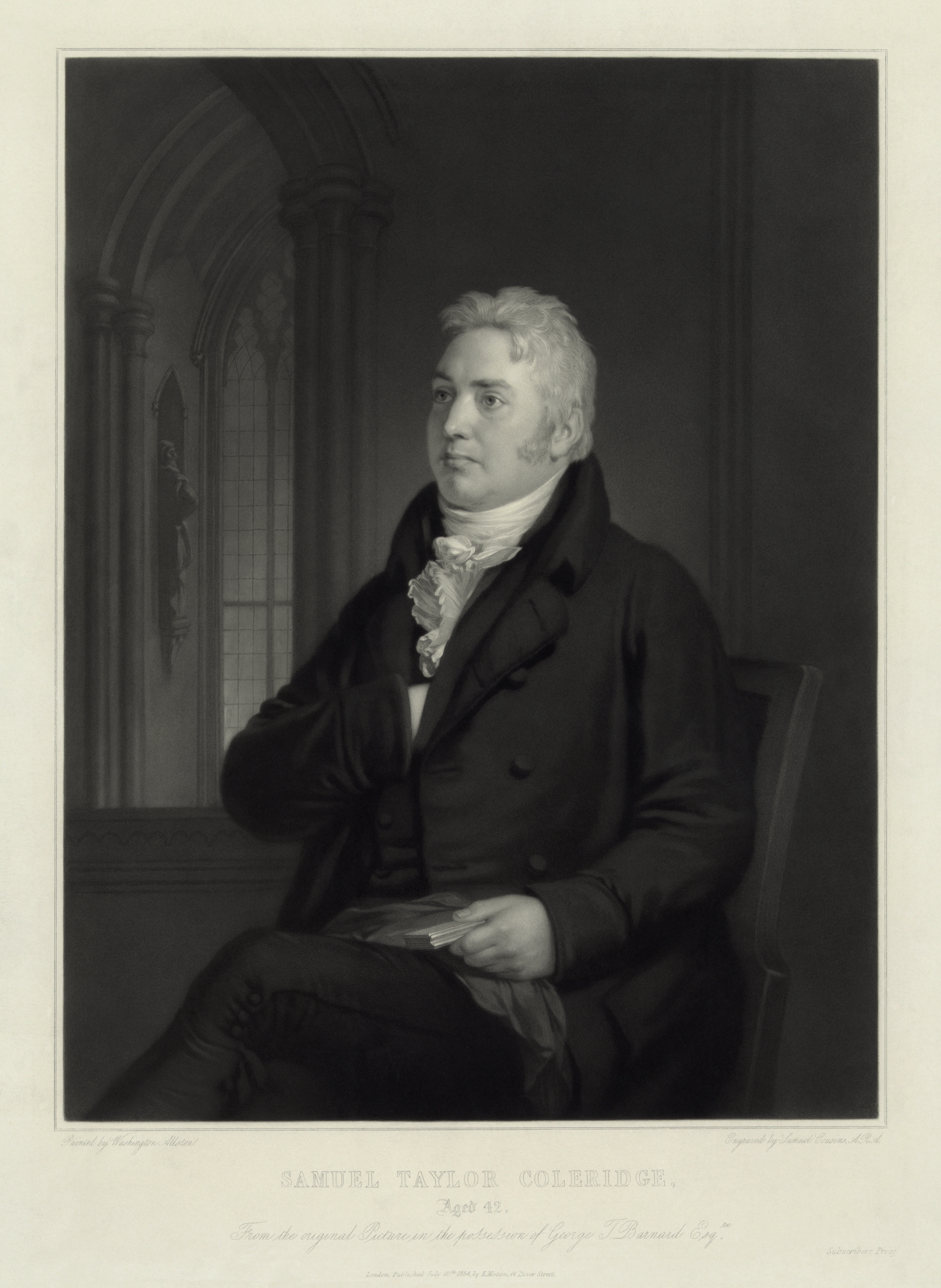
Samuel Taylor Coleridge, friend of Wordsworth and fellow Romantic poet

The ode praises children for being the "best Philosopher" ("lover of truth") because they live in truth and have prophetic abilities. This claim bothers Coleridge and he writes, in Biographia Literaria, that Wordsworth was trying to be a prophet in an area that he could have no claim to prophecy. In his analysis of the poem, Coleridge breaks down many aspects of Wordsworth's claims and asks, "In what sense can the magnificent attributes, above quoted, be appropriated to a child, which would not make them equally suitable to a be, or a dog, or a field of corn: or even to a ship, or to the wind and waves that propel it? The omnipresent Spirit works equally in them, as in the child; and the child is equally unconscious of it as they." The knowledge of nature that Wordsworth thinks is wonderful in children, Coleridge feels is absurd in Wordsworth since a poet couldn't know how to make sense of a child's ability to sense the divine any more than the child with a limited understanding could know of the world. I. A. Richards, in his work Coleridge on Imagination (1934), responds to Coleridge's claims by asking, "Why should Wordsworth deny that, in a much less degree, these attributes are equally suitable to a bee, or a dog, or a field of corn?"

Later, Cleanth Brooks reanalyzes the argument to point out that Wordsworth would include the animals among the children. He also explains that the child is the "best philosopher" because of his understanding of the "eternal deep", which comes from enjoying the world through play: "They are playing with their little spades and sand-buckets along the beach on which the waves break." In 1992, Susan Eilenberg returned to the dispute and defended Coleridge's analysis by explaining that "It exhibits the workings of the ambivalence Coleridge feels toward the character of Wordsworth's poetry; only now, confronting greater poetry, his uneasiness is greater... If Wordsworth's weakness is incongruity, his strength is propriety. That Coleridge should tell us this at such length tells as much about Coleridge as about Wordsworth: reading the second volume of the Biographia, we learn not only Wordsworth's strong and weak points but also the qualities that most interest Coleridge."

== Critical reception ==
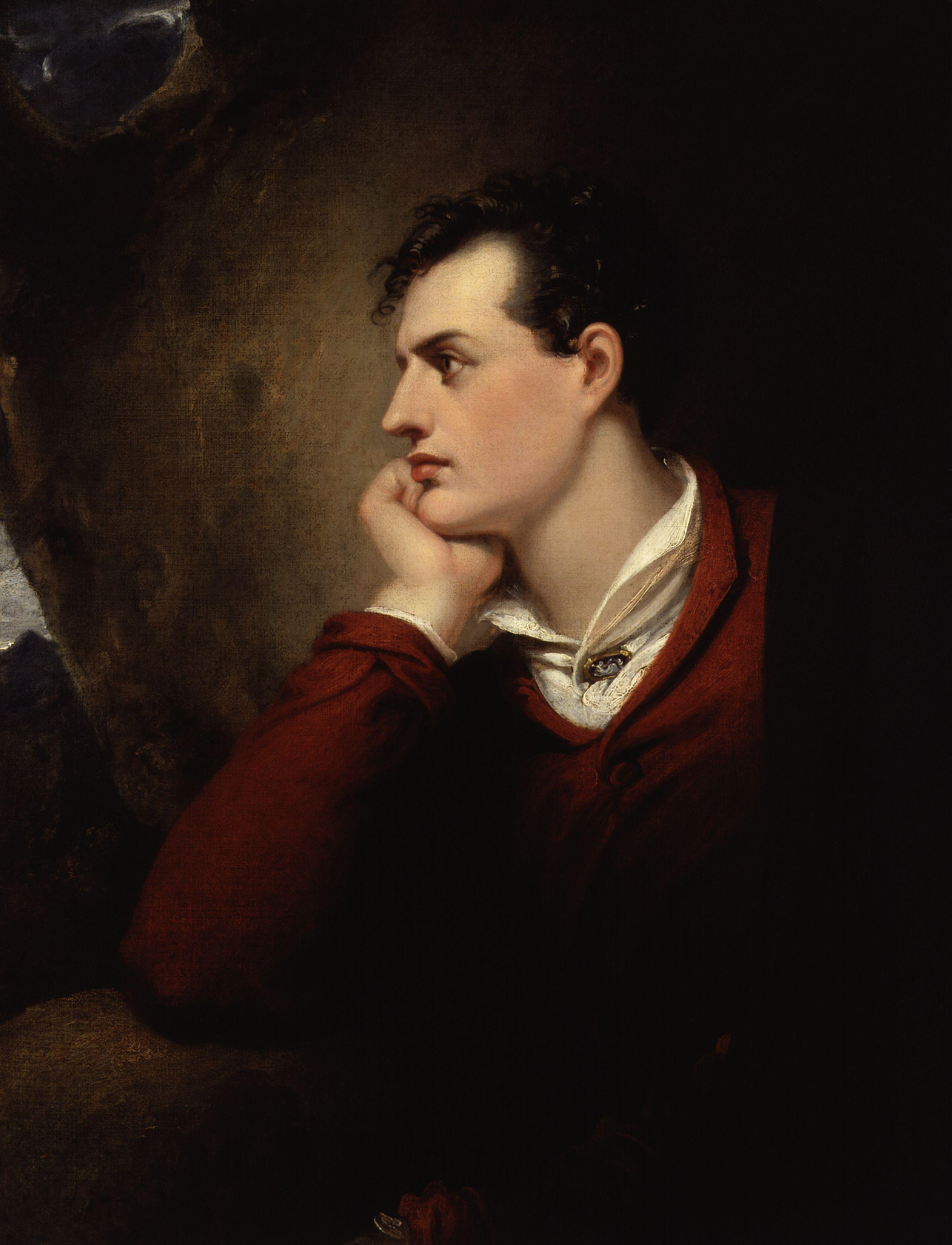
George Gordon Byron, second-generation Romantic poet

The Ode: Intimations of Immortality is the most celebrated poem published in Wordsworth's Poems in Two Volumes collection. While modern critics believe that the poems published in Wordsworth's 1807 collection represented a productive and good period of his career, contemporary reviewers were split on the matter and many negative reviews cast doubts on his circle of poets known as the Lake Poets. Negative reviews were found in the Critical Review, Le Beau Monde and Literary Annual Register. George Gordon Byron, a fellow Romantic poet but not an associate of Wordsworth's, responded to Poems in Two Volumes, in a 3 July 1807 Monthly Literary Recreations review, with a claim that the collection lacked the quality found in Lyrical Ballads. When referring to Ode: Intimations of Immortality, he dismissed the poem as Wordsworth's "innocent odes" without providing any in-depth response, stating only: "On the whole, however, with the exception of the above, and other innocent odes of the same cast, we think these volumes display a genius worthy of higher pursuits, and regret that Mr. W. confines his muse to such trifling subjects... Many, with inferior abilities, have acquired a loftier seat on Parnassus, merely by attempting strains in which Mr. W. is more qualified to excel." The poem was received negatively but for a different reason from Wordsworth's and Coleridge's friend Robert Southey, also a Romantic poet. Southey, in an 8 December 1807 letter to Walter Scott, wrote, "There are certainly some pieces there which are good for nothing... and very many which it was highly injudicious to publish.... The Ode upon Pre-existence is a dark subject darkly handled. Coleridge is the only man who could make such a subject luminous."

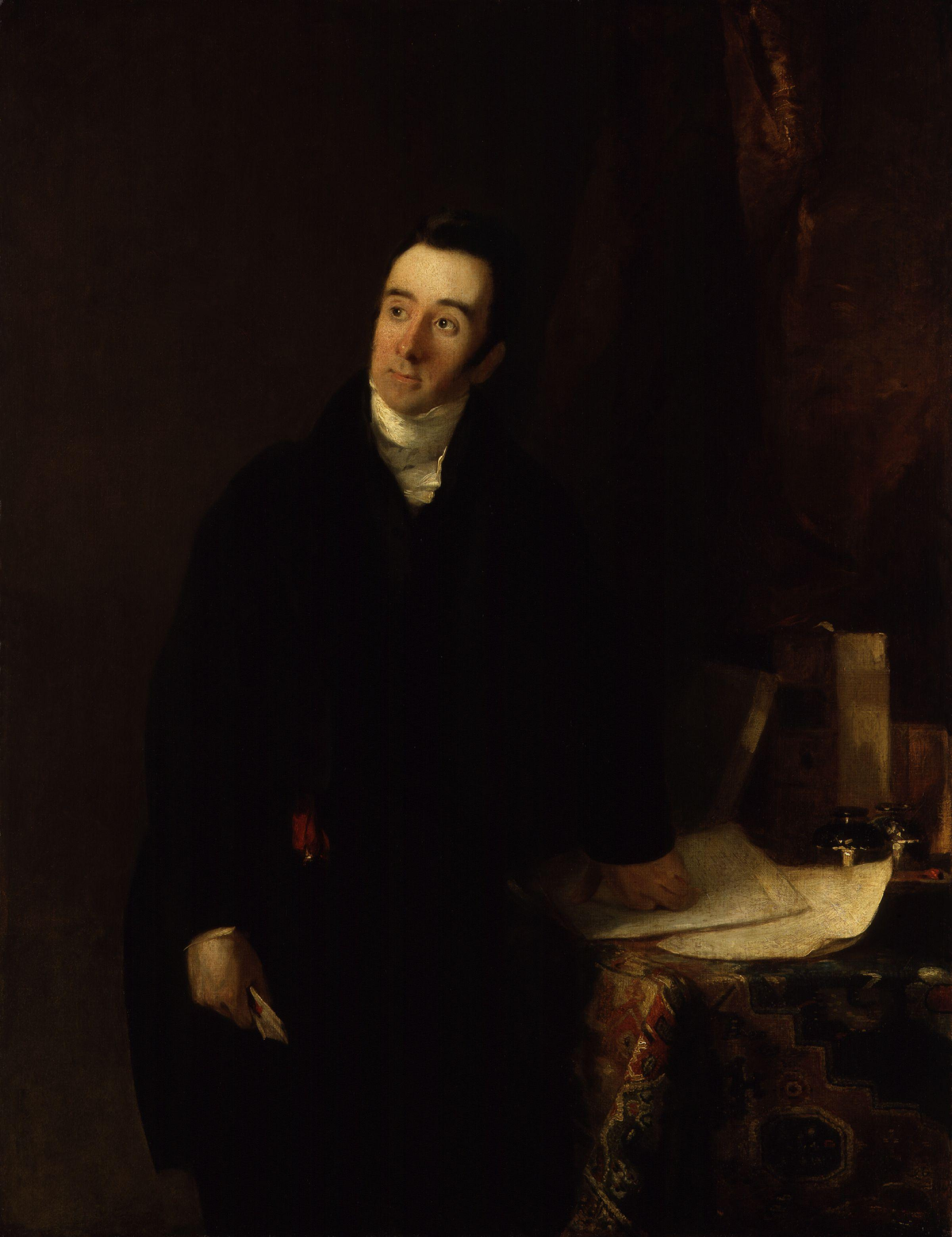
Francis Jeffrey, critic of the Romantic poetry movement

Francis Jeffrey, a Whig lawyer and editor of the Edinburgh Review, originally favoured Wordsworth's poetry following the publication of Lyrical Ballads in 1798 but turned against the poet from 1802 onward. In response to Wordsworth's 1807 collection of poetry, Jeffrey contributed an anonymous review to the October 1807 Edinburgh Review that condemned Wordsworth's poetry again. In particular, he declared the ode "beyond all doubt, the most illegible and unintelligible part of the publication. We can pretend to give no analysis or explanation of it;-- our readers must make what they can of the following extracts." After quoting the passage, he argues that he has provided enough information for people to judge if Wordsworth's new school of poetry should replace the previous system of poetry: "If we were to stop here, we do not think that Mr Wordsworth, or his admirers, would have any reason to complain; for what we have now quoted is undeniably the most peculiar and characteristic part of his publication, and must be defended and applauded if the merit or originality of his system is to be seriously maintained. In putting forth his own opinion, Jeffrey explains, "In our own opinion, however, the demerit of that system cannot be fairly appretiated, until it be shown, that the author of the bad verses which we have already extracted, can write good verses when he pleases". Jeffrey later wrote a semi-positive review of the ode, for the 12 April 1808 Edinburgh Review, that praised Wordsworth when he was least Romantic in his poetry. He believed that Wordsworth's greatest weakness was portraying the low aspects of life in a lofty tone.

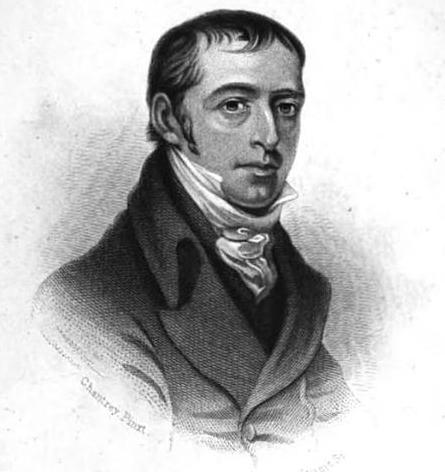
James Montgomery (poet)

Another semi-negative response to the poem followed on 4 January 1808 in the Eclectic Review. The writer, James Montgomery, attacked the 1807 collection of poems for depicting low subjects. When it came to the ode, Montgomery attacked the poem for depicting pre-existence. After quoting the poem with extracts from the whole collection, he claimed, "We need insist no more on the necessity of using, in poetry, a language different from and superior to 'the real language of men,' since Mr. Wordsworth himself is so frequently compelled to employ it, for the expression of thoughts which without it would be incommunicable. These volumes are distinguished by the same blemishes and beauties as were found in their predecessors, but in an inverse proportion: the defects of the poet, in this performance, being as much greater than his merits, as they were less in his former publication." In his conclusion, Montgomery returned to the ode and claimed, that "the reader is turned loose into a wilderness of sublimity, tenderness, bombast, and absurdity, to find out the subject as well as he can... After our preliminary remarks on Mr. Wordsworth's theory of poetical language, and the quotations which we have given from these and his earlier compositions, it will be unnecessary to offer any further estimate or character of his genius. We shall only add one remark.... Of the pieces now published he has said nothing: most of them seem to have been written for no purpose at all, and certainly to no good one." In January 1815, Montgomery returned to Wordsworth's poetry in another review and argues, "Mr. Wordsworth often speaks in ecstatic strains of the pleasure of infancy. If we rightly understand him, he conjectures that the soul comes immediately from a world of pure felicity, when it is born into this troublous scene of care and vicissitude... This brilliant allegory, (for such we must regard it,) is employed to illustrate the mournful truth, that looking back from middle age to the earliest period of remembrance we find, 'That there hath pass'd away a glory from the earth,'... Such is Life".

=== Later responses ===
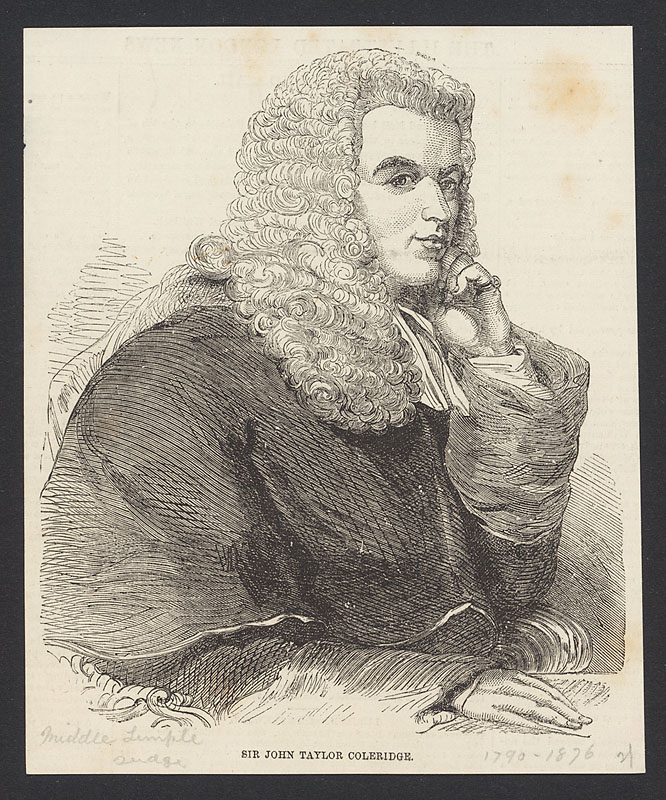
John Taylor Coleridge, nephew of Samuel Taylor Coleridge and lawyer

John Taylor Coleridge, nephew to Samuel Taylor Coleridge, submitted an anonymous review for the April 1814 Quarterly Review. Though it was a review of his uncle's Remorse, he connects the intention and imagery found within Coleridge's poem to that in Ode: Intimation of Immortality and John Wilson's "To a Sleeping Child" when saying, "To an extension or rather a modification of this last mentioned principle [obedience to some internal feeling] may perhaps be attributed the beautiful tenet so strongly inculcated by them of the celestial purity of infancy. 'Heaven lies about us in our infancy,' says Mr. Wordsworth, in a passage which strikingly exemplifies the power of imaginative poetry". John Taylor Coleridge returned to Wordsworth's poetry and the ode in a May 1815 review for the British Critic. In the review, he partially condemns Wordsworth's emphasis in the ode on children being connected to the divine: "His occasional lapses into childish and trivial allusion may be accounted for, from the same tendency. He is obscure, when he leaves out links in the chain of association, which the reader cannot easily supply... In his descriptions of children this is particularly the case, because of his firm belief in a doctrine, more poetical perhaps, than either philosophical or christian, that 'Heaven lies about us in our infancy.'"

John Taylor Coleridge continues by explaining the negative aspects of such a concept: "Though the tenderness and beauty resulting from this opinion be to us a rich overpayment for the occasional strainings and refinements of sentiment to which it has given birth, it has yet often served to make the author ridiculous in common eyes, in that it has led him to state his own fairy dreams as the true interpretation and import of the looks and movements of children, as being even really in their minds." In a February 1821 review for the British Critic, John Taylor Coleridge attacked the poem again for a heretical view found in the notion of pre-existence and how it reappeared in Wordsworth's poem "On an Extraordinary Evening of Splendour and Beauty". However, he does claim that the passage of the ode containing the idea is "a passage of exquisite poetry" and that "A more poetical theory of human nature cannot well be devised, and if the subject were one, upon which error was safe, we should forbear to examine it closely, and yield to the delight we have often received from it in the ode from which the last extract [Ode: Intimations of Immortality] is made." He was to continue: "If, therefore, we had met the doctrine in any poet but Mr. Wordsworth, we should have said nothing; but we believe him to be one not willing to promulgate error, even in poetry, indeed it is manifest that he makes his poetry subservient to his philosophy; and this particular notion is so mixed up by him with others, in which it is impossible to suppose him otherwise than serious; that we are constrained to take it for his real and sober belief."

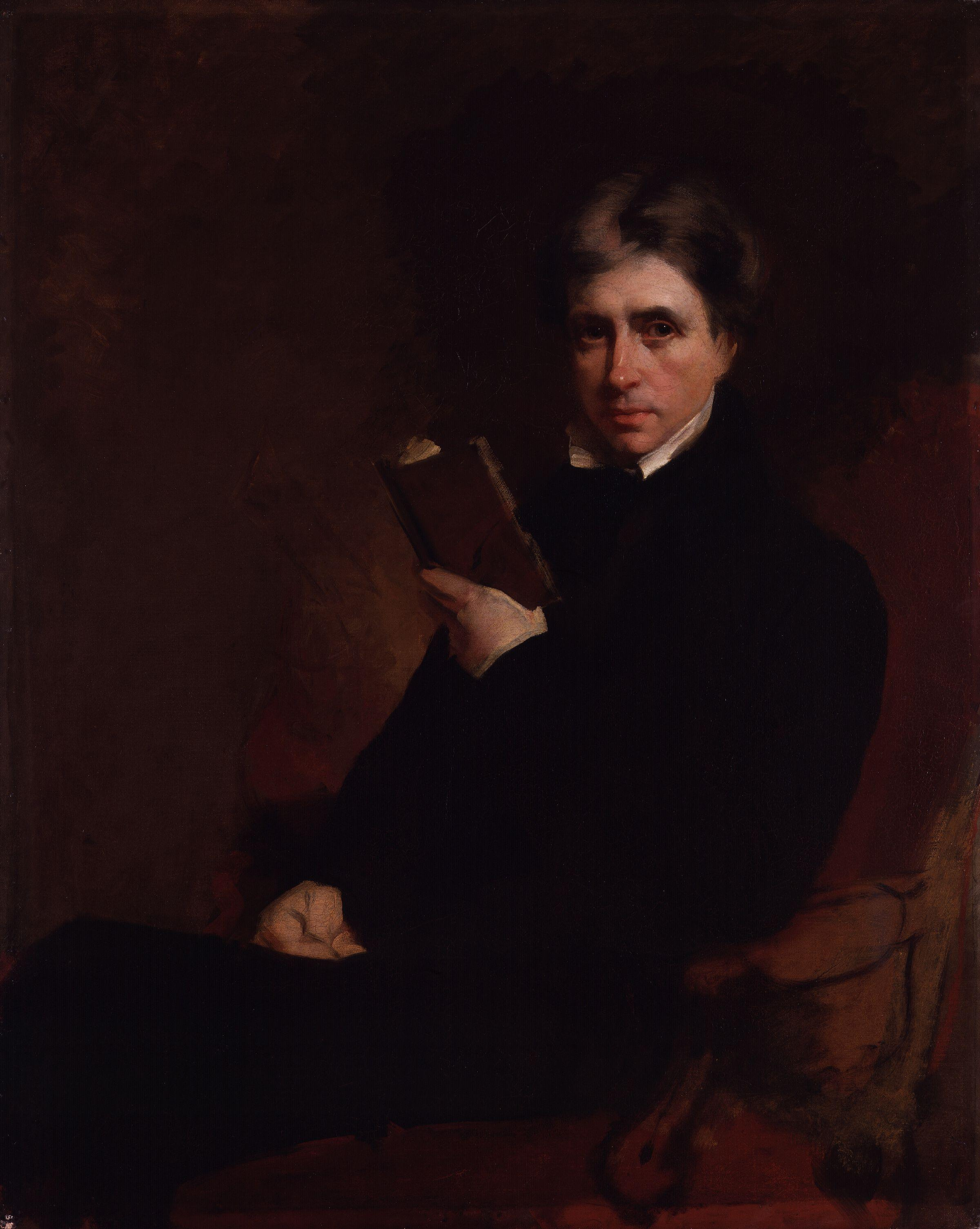
Leigh Hunt, second-generation Romantic poet

In the same year came responses to the ode by two Romantic writers. Leigh Hunt, a second-generation Romantic poet, added notes to his poem Feast of the Poets that respond to the ideas suggested in Wordsworth's poetry. These ideas include Wordsworth's promotion of a simple mental state without cravings for knowledge, and it is such an ideas that Hunt wanted to mock in his poem. However, Hunt did not disagree completely with Wordsworth's sentiments. After quoting the final lines of the Ode: Intimations of Immortality, those that "Wordsworth has beautifully told us, that to him '--the meanest flow'r that blows can give/ Thoughts that do often lie too deep for tears", Hunt claims, "I have no doubt of it; and far be it from me to cast stones into the well in which they lie,-- to disturb those reposing waters,-- that freshness at the bottom of warm hearts,-- those thoughts, which if they are too deep for tears, are also, in their best mood, too tranquil even for smiles. Far be it also from me to hinder the communication of such thoughts to mankind, when they are not sunk beyond their proper depth, so as to make one dizzy in looking down to them." Following Hunt, William Hazlitt, a critic and Romantic writer, wrote a series of essays called "Character of Mr. Wordsworth's New Poems" in three parts, starting in the 21 August 1814 Examiner. Although Hazlitt treated Wordsworth's poetry fairly, he was critical of Wordsworth himself and he removed any positive statements about Wordsworth's person from a reprint of the essays. The 2 October 1814 essay examined poetry as either of imagination or of sentiment, and quotes the final lines of the poem as an example of "The extreme simplicity which some persons have objected to in Mr. Wordsworth's poetry is to be found only in the subject and style: the sentiments are subtle and profound. In the latter respect, his poetry is as much above the common standard or capacity, as in the other it is below it... We go along with him, while he is the subject of his own narrative, but we take leave of him when he makes pedlars and ploughmen his heroes and the interpreters of his sentiments."

John Keats, second-generation Romantic poet

In 1817 came two more responses by Romantic poets to the ode. Coleridge was impressed by the ode's themes, rhythm, and structure since he first heard the beginning stanzas in 1802. In an analysis of Wordsworth's poetry for his work Biographia Literaria (1817), Coleridge described what he considered as both the positives and the defects of the ode. In his argument, he both defended his technique and explained: "Though the instances of this defect in Mr. Wordsworth's poems are so few, that for themselves it would have been scarce just to attract the reader's attention toward them; yet I have dwelt on it, and perhaps the more for this very reason. For being so very few, they cannot sensibly detract from the reputation of an author, who is even characterized by the number of profound truths in his writings, which will stand the severest analysis; and yet few as they are, they are exactly those passages which his blind admirers would be most likely, and best able, to imitate." Of the positives that Coleridge identified within the poem, he placed emphasis on Wordsworth's choice of grammar and language that established a verbal purity in which the words chosen could not be substituted without destroying the beauty of the poem. Another aspect Coleridge favoured was the poem's originality of thought and how it contained Wordsworth's understanding of nature and his own experience. Coleridge also praised the lack of a rigorous structure within the poem and claimed that Wordsworth was able to truly capture the imagination. However, part of Coleridge's analysis of the poem and of the poet tend to describe his idealised version of positives and negative than an actual concrete object. In the same year, it was claimed by Benjamin Bailey, in a 7 May 1849 letter to R. M. Milnes, that John Keats, one of the second-generation Romantic poets, discussed the poem with him. In his recollection, Bailey said, "The following passage from Wordsworth's ode on Immortality [lines 140–148] was deeply felt by Keats, who however at this time seemed to me to value this great Poet rather in particular passages than in the full length portrait, as it were, of the great imaginative & philosophic Christian Poet, which he really is, & which Keats obviously, not long afterwards, felt him to be."

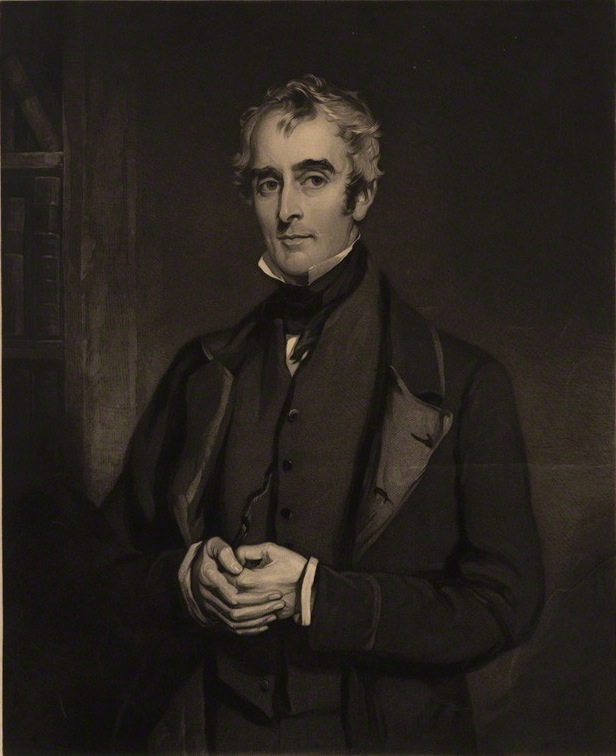
John Lockhart, writer, biographer and critic

Following Coleridge's response was an anonymous review in the May 1820 Blackwood's Edinburgh Magazine, possible by either John Lockhart and John Wilson together or just Lockhart on his own. Of Wordsworth's abilities as a poet in general, the review claimed: "Mr Wordsworth ... is entitled to be classed with the very highest names among his predecessors, as a pure and reverent worshipper of the true majesty of the English Muse" and that "Of the genius of Mr Wordsworth, in short, it is now in the hands of every man to judge freely and fully, and for himself. Our own opinion, ever since this Journal commenced, has been clearly and entirely before them; and if there be any one person, on whose mind what we have quoted now, is not enough to make an impression similar to that which our own judgment had long before received – we have nothing more to say to that person in regard to the subject of poetry." In discussing the ode in particular, the review characterised the poem as "one of the grandest of his early pieces". In December 1820 came an article in the New Monthly Magazine titled "On the Genius and Writings of Wordsworth" written by Thomas Noon Talfourd. When discussing the poem, Talfourd declared that the ode "is, to our feelings, the noblest piece of lyric poetry in the world. It was the first poem of its author which we read, and never shall we forget the sensations which it excited within us. We had heard the cold sneers attached to his name... and here – in the works of this derided poet – we found a new vein of imaginative sentiment open to us – sacred recollections brought back to our hearts with all the freshness of novelty, and all the venerableness of far-off time". When analysing the relationship between infants and the divine within the poem, the article continued: "What a gift did we then inherit! To have the best and most imperishable of intellectual treasures – the mighty world of reminiscences of the days of infancy – set before us in a new and holier light".

William Blake, a Romantic poet and artist, thought that Wordsworth was at the same level as the poets Dante, Shakespeare, and Milton. In a diary entry for 27 December 1825, H. C. Robinson recounted a conversation between himself and William Blake shortly before Blake's death: "I read to him Wordsworth's incomparable ode, which he heartily enjoyed. But he repeated, 'I fear Wordsworth loves nature, and nature is the work of the Devil. The Devil is in us as 'far as we are nature.'... The parts of Wordsworth's ode which Blake most enjoyed were the most obscure—at all events, those which I least like and comprehend." Following Blake, Chauncy Hare Townshend produced "An Essay on the Theory and the Writings of Wordsworth"for Blackwood's Edinburgh Magazine in 1829. In the third part, he critiqued Wordsworth's use of pre-existence within the poem and asked "unless our author means to say that, having existed from all eternity, we are of an eternal and indestructible essence; or, in other words, that being incarnate portion of the Deity... we are as Immortal as himself. But if the poet intends to affirm this, do you not perceive that he frustrates his own aim?" He continued by explaining why he felt that Wordsworth's concept fell short of any useful purpose: "For if we are of God's indivisible essence, and receive our separate consciousness from the wall of flesh which, at our birth, was raised between us and the Found of Being, we must, on the dissolution of the body... be again merged in the simple and uncompounded Godhead, lose our individual consciousness... in another sense, become as though we had never been." He concluded his analysis with a critique of the poem as a whole: "I should say that Wordsworth does not display in it any great clearness of thought, or felicity of language... the ode in question is not so much abstruse in idea as crabbed in expression. There appears to be a laborious toiling after originality, ending in a dismal want of harmony."

=== Victorian responses ===
The ode, like others of Wordsworth's poetry, was favoured by Victorians for its biographical aspects and the way Wordsworth approached feelings of despondency. The American Romantic poet Ralph Waldo Emerson, in his 1856 work English Traits, claimed that the poem "There are torpid places in his mind, there is something hard and sterile in his poetry, want of grace and variety, want of due catholicity and cosmopolitan scope: he had conformities to English politics and tradition; he had egotistic puerilities in the choice and treatment of his subjects; but let us say of him, that, alone in his time he treated the human mind well, and with an absolute trust. His adherence to his poetic creed rested on real inspirations." The editor of Harper's New Monthly Magazine, George William Curtis, praised the ode in his December 1859 column "Editor's Easy Chair" and claimed that "it was Wordsworth who has written one of the greatest English poets... For sustained splendor of imagination, deep, solemn, and progressive thought, and exquisite variety of music, that poem is unsurpassed. Since Milton's 'Ode upon the Nativity' there is nothing so fine, not forgetting Dryden, Pope, Collins, and the rest, who have written odes."

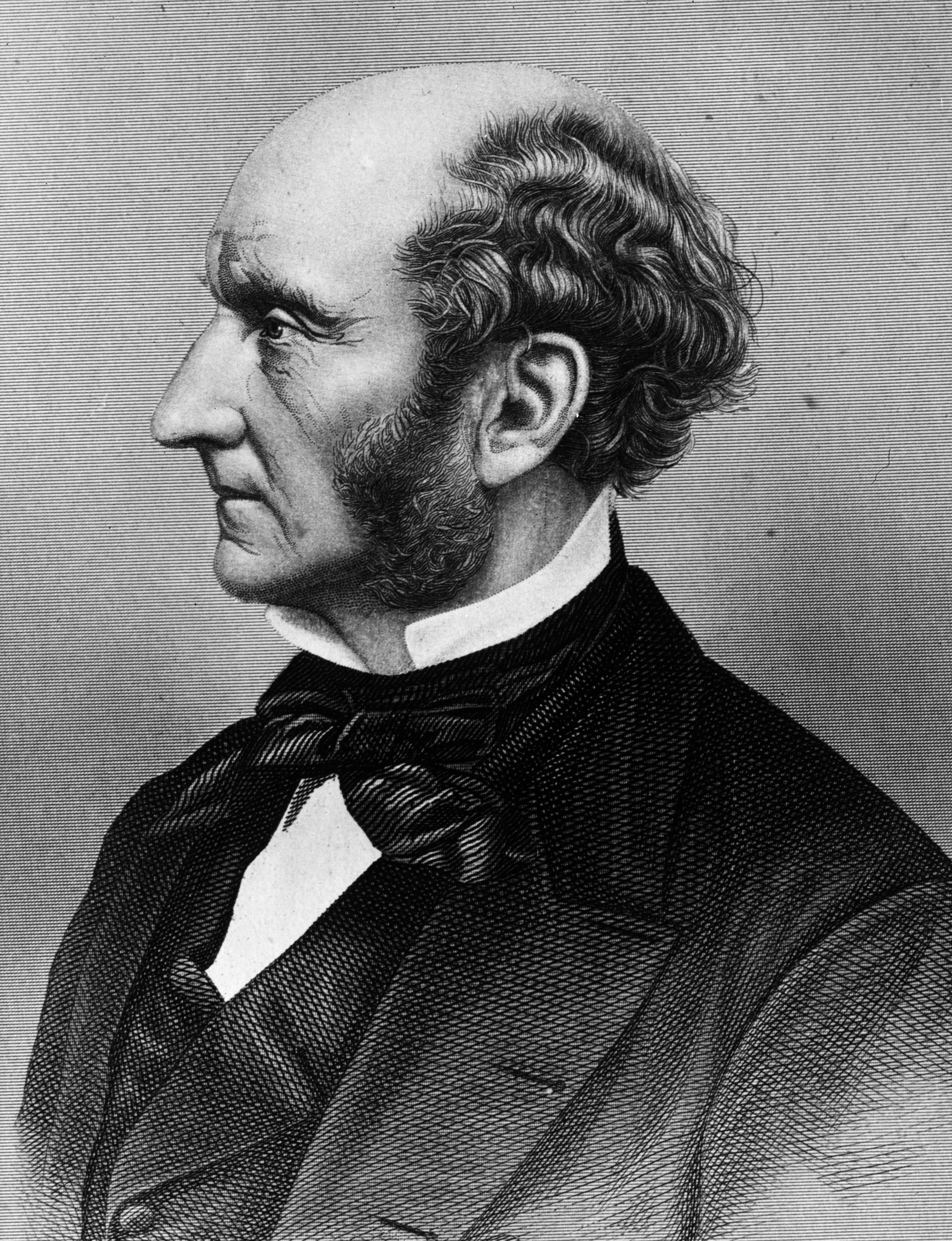
John Stuart Mill, philosopher

The philosopher John Stuart Mill liked Wordsworth's ode and found it influential to the formation of his own thoughts. In his Autobiography (1873), he credited Wordsworth's poetry as being able to relieve his mind and overcome a sense of apathy towards life. Of the poems, he particularly emphasised both Wordsworth's 1815 collection of poetry and the Ode: Intimations of Immortality as providing the most help to him, and he specifically said of the ode: "I found that he too had had similar experience to mine; that he also had felt that the first freshness of youthful enjoyment of life was not lasting; but that he had sought for compensation, and found it, in the way in which he was now teaching me to find it. The result was that I gradually, but completely, emerged from my habitual depression, and was never again subject to it." David Mason followed Mill in an 1875 essay on literature, including Wordsworth's poetry. After quoting from the ode, Mason claimed of the poem: "These, and hundreds of other passages that might be quoted, show that Wordsworth possessed, in a very high degree indeed, the true primary quality of the poet—imagination; a surcharge of personality or vital spirit, perpetually overflowing among the objects of the otherwise conditioned universe, and refashioning them according to its pleasure."

After Mill, critics focused on the ode's status among Wordsworth's other poems. In July 1877, Edward Dowden, in an article for the Contemporary Review, discussed the Transcendental Movement and the nature of the Romantic poets. when referring to Wordsworth and the ode, he claimed: "Wordsworth in his later years lost, as he expresses it, courage, the spring-like hope and confidence which enables a man to advance joyously towards new discovery of truth. But the poet of 'Tintern Abbey' and the 'Ode on Intimations of Immortality' and the 'Prelude' is Wordsworth in his period of highest energy and imaginative light". Matthew Arnold, in his preface to an 1879 edition of Wordsworth's poetry, explains that he was a great lover of the poems. However, he explains why he believed that the ode was not one of the best: "I have a warm admiration for Laodameia and for the great Ode; but if I am to tell the very truth, I find Laodameia not wholly free from something artificial, and the great Ode not wholly free from something declamatory." His concern was over what he saw as the ideas expressed on childhood and maturity: "Even the 'intimations' of the famous Ode, those corner-stones of the supposed philosophic system of Wordsworth... has itself not the character of poetic truth of the best kind; it has no real solidity" "to say that universally this instinct is mighty in childhood, and tends to die away afterwards, is to say what is extremely doubtful... In general, we may say of these high instincts of early childhood... what Thucydides says of the early achievements of the Greek race:--'It is impossible to speak with certainty of what is so remove; but from all that we can really investigate, I should say that they were no very great things.'"

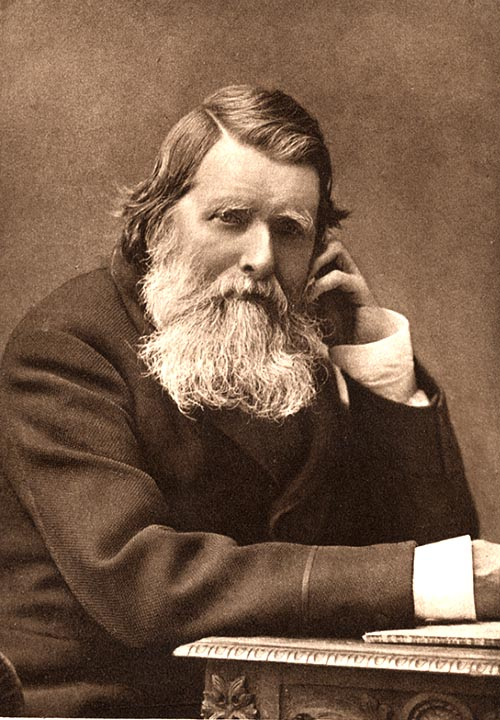
John Ruskin, Victorian critic

The Victorian critic John Ruskin, towards the end of the 19th century, provided short analyses of various writers in his "Nature and Literature" essays collected in "Art and Life: a Ruskin Anthology". In speaking of Wordsworth, Ruskin claimed, "Wordsworth is simply a Westmoreland peasant, with considerably less shrewdness than most border Englishmen or Scotsmen inherit; and no sense of humor; but gifted... with vivid sense of natural beauty, and a pretty turn for reflection, not always acute, but, as far as they reach, medicinal to the fever of the restless and corrupted life around him." After mocking the self-reflective nature of Wordsworth's poetry, he then declared that the poetry was "Tuneful nevertheless at heart, and of the heavenly choir, I gladly and frankly acknowledge him; and our English literature enriched with a new and singular virtue in the aerial purity and healthful rightness of his quiet song;—but aerial only—not ethereal; and lowly in its privacy of light". The ode, to Ruskin, becomes a means to deride Wordsworth's intellect and faith when he claims that Wordsworth was "content with intimations of immortality such as may be in skipping of lambs, and laughter of children-incurious to see in the hands the print of the nails." Ruskin's claims were responded to by an article by Richard Hutton in the 7 August 1880 Spectator. The article, "Mr. Ruskin on Wordsworth", stated, "We should hardly have expected Mr. Ruskin—a great master of irony though he be—to lay his finger so unerringly as he does on the weak point of Wordsworth's sublime ode on the 'Intimations of Immortality,' when he speaks of him—quite falsely, by the way—as 'content with intimations of immortality'". The article continued with praise of Wordsworth and condemns Ruskin further: "But then, though he shows how little he understands the ode, in speaking of Wordsworth as content with such intimations, he undoubtedly does touch the weak chord in what, but for that weak chord, would be one of the greatest of all monuments of human genius... But any one to whom Wordsworth's great ode is the very core of that body of poetry which makes up the best part of his imaginative life, will be as much astonished to find Mr. Ruskin speaking of it so blindly and unmeaningly as he does".

The ode was viewed positively by the end of the century. George Saintsbury, in his A Short History of English Literature (1898), declared the importance and greatness of the ode: "Perhaps twice only, in Tintern Abbey and in the Ode on the Intimations of Immortality, is the full, the perfect Wordsworth, with his half-pantheistic worship of nature, informed and chastened by an intense sense of human conduct, of reverence and almost of humbleness, displayed in the utmost poetic felicity. And these two are accordingly among the great poems of the world. No unfavorable criticism on either – and there has been some, new and old, from persons in whom it is surprising, as well as from persons in whom it is natural – has hurt them, though it may have hurt the critics. They are, if not in every smallest detail, yet as wholes, invulnerable and imperishable. They could not be better done."

=== Modern responses ===
At the beginning of the 20th century, response to the ode by critics was mostly positive. Andrew Bradley declared in 1909 that "The Immortality Ode, like King Lear, is its author's greatest product, but not his best piece of work." When speaking of Grasmere and Wordsworth, Elias Sneath wrote in 1912: "It witnessed the composition of a large number of poems, many of which may be regarded among the finest products of his imagination. Most of them have already been considered. However, one remains which, in the judgment of some critics, more than any other poem of the numerous creations of his genius, entitles him to a seat among the Immortals. This is the celebrated [ode]... It is, in some respects, one of his most important works, whether viewed from the stand point of mere art, or from that of poetic insight." George Harper, following Sneath in 1916, described the poem in positive terms and said, "Its radiance comes and goes through a shimmering veil. Yet, when we look close, we find nothing unreal or unfinished. This beauty, though supernal, is not evanescent. It bides our return, and whoever comes to seek it as a little child will find it. The imagery, though changing at every turn, is fresh and simple. The language, though connected with thoughts so serious that they impart to it a classic dignity, is natural and for the most part plain.... Nevertheless, a peculiar glamour surrounds the poem. It is the supreme example of what I may venture to term the romance of philosophic thought."

The 1930s contained criticism that praised the poem, but most critics found fault with particular aspects of the poem. F. R. Leavis, in his Revaluation (1936), argued that "Criticism of Stanza VIII ... has been permissible, even correct, since Coleridge's time. But the empty grandiosity apparent there is merely the local manifestation of a general strain, a general factitiousness. The Ode... belongs to the transition at its critical phase, and contains decided elements of the living." He continued, "But these do not lessen the dissatisfaction that one feels with the movement—the movement that makes the piece an ode in the Grand Style; for, as one reads, it is in terms of the movement that the strain, the falsity, first asserts itself. The manipulations by which the change of mood are indicated have, by the end of the third stanza, produced an effect that, in protest, one described as rhythmic vulgarity..., and the strain revealed in technique has an obvious significance". In 1939, Basil Willey argued that the poem was "greatly superior, as poetry, to its psychological counterpart in The Prelude" but also said that "the semi-Platonic machinery of pre-existence... seems intrusive, and foreign to Wordsworth" before concluding that the poem was the "final and definitive expression to the most poignant experience of his poetic life".

Cleanth Brooks used the Ode: Intimation of Immortality as one of his key works to analyse in his 1947 work The Well Wrought Urn. His analysis broke down the ode as a poem disconnected from its biographical implications and focused on the paradoxes and ironies contained within the language. In introducing his analysis, he claimed that it "may be surmised from what has already been remarked, the 'Ode' for all its fine passages, is not entirely successful as a poem. Yet, we shall be able to make our best defense of it in proportion as we recognize and value its use of ambiguous symbol and paradoxical statement. Indeed, it might be maintained that, failing to do this, we shall miss much of its power as poetry and even some of its accuracy of statement." After breaking down the use of paradox and irony in language, he analyses the statements about the childhood perception of glory in Stanza VI and argued, "This stanza, though not one of the celebrated stanzas of the poem, is one of the most finely ironical. Its structural significance too is of first importance, and has perhaps in the past been given too little weight." After analysing more of the poem, Brooks points out that the lines in Stanza IX contains lines that "are great poetry. They are great poetry because ... the children are not terrified... The children exemplify the attitude toward eternity which the other philosopher, the mature philosopher, wins to with difficulty, if he wins to it at all." In his conclusion about the poem, he argues, "The greatness of the 'Ode' lies in the fact that Wordsworth is about the poet's business here, and is not trying to inculcate anything. Instead, he is trying to dramatize the changing interrelations which determine the major imagery." Following Brooks in 1949, C. M. Bowra stated, "There is no need to dispute the honour in which by common consent it [the ode] is held" but he adds "There are passages in the 'Immortal Ode' which have less than his usual command of rhythm and ability to make a line stand by itself... But these are unimportant. The whole has a capacious sweep, and the form suits the majestic subject... There are moments when we suspect Wordsworth of trying to say more than he means. Similarly, George Mallarby also revealed some flaws in the poem in his 1950 analysis: "In spite of the doubtful philosophical truth of the doctrine of pre-existence borrowed from Platon, in spite of the curiously placed emphasis and an exuberance of feeling somewhat artificially introduced, in spite of the frustrating and unsatisfying conclusion, this poem will remain, so long as the English language remains, one of its chief and unquestionable glories. It lends itself, more than most English odes, to recitation in the grand manner."

By the 1960s and 1970s, the reception of the poem was mixed but remained overall positive. Mary Moorman analysed the poem in 1965 with an emphasis on its biographical origins and Wordsworth's philosophy on the relationship between mankind and nature. When describing the beauty of the poem, she stated, "Wordsworth once spoke of the Ode as 'this famous, ambitious and occasionally magnificent poem'. Yet it is not so much its magnificence that impresses, as the sense of resplendent yet peaceful light in which it is bathed—whether it is the 'celestial light' and 'glory' of the first stanza, or the 'innocent Brightness of a new-born Day' of the last." In 1967, Yvor Winters criticised the poem and claimed that "Wordsworth gives us bad oratory about his own clumsy emotions and a landscape that he has never fully realized." Geoffrey Durrant, in his 1970 analysis of the critical reception of the ode, claimed, "it may be remarked that both the admirers of the Ode, and those who think less well of it, tend to agree that it is unrepresentative, and that its enthusiastic, Dionysian, and mystical vein sets it apart, either on a lonely summit or in a special limbo, from the rest of Wordsworth's work. And the praise that it has received is at times curiously equivocal." In 1975, Richard Brantley, labelling the poem as the "great Ode", claimed that "Wordsworth's task of tracing spiritual maturity, his account of a grace quite as amazing and perhaps even as Christian as the experience recorded in the spiritual autobiography of his day, is therefore essentially completed". He continued by using the ode as evidence that the "poetic record of his remaining life gives little evidence of temptations or errors as unsettling as the ones he faced and made in France." Summarizing the way critics have approached the poem, John Beer claimed in 1978 that the poem "is commonly regarded as the greatest of his shorter works". Additionally, Beer argued that the ode was the basis for the concepts found in Wordsworth's later poetry.

Criticism of the ode during the 1980s ranged in emphasis on which aspects of the poem were most important, but critics were mostly positive regardless of their approach. In 1980, Hunter Davies analysed the period of time when Wordsworth worked on the ode and included it as one of the "scores of poems of unarguable genius", and later declared the poem Wordsworth's "greatest ode". Stephen Gill, in a study of the style of the 1802 poems, argued in 1989 that the poems were new and broad in range with the ode containing "impassioned sublimity". He later compared the ode with Wordsworth's "Ode to Duty" to declare that "The Ode: Intimations, by contrast, rich in phrases that have entered the language and provided titles for other people's books, is Wordsworth's greatest achievement in rhythm and cadence. Together with Tintern Abbey it has always commanded attention as Wordsworth's strongest meditative poem and Wordsworth indicated his assessment of it by ensuring through the layout and printing of his volumes that the Ode stood apart." In 1986, Marjorie Levinson searched for a political basis in many of Wordsworth's poems and argued that the ode, along with "Michael", Peele Castle, and Tintern Abbey, are "incontestably among the poet's greatest works". Susan Wolfson, in the same year, claimed that "the force of the last lines arises from the way the language in which the poet expresses a resolution of grief at the same time renders a metaphor that implies that grief has not been resolved so much as repressed and buried. And this ambiguity involves another, for Wordsworth makes it impossible to decide whether the tension between resolution and repression... is his indirect confession of a failure to achieve transcendence or a knowing evasion of an imperative to do so." After performing a Freudian-based analysis of the ode, William Galperin, in 1989, argues that "Criticism, in short, cannot accept responsibility for The Excursion's failings any more than it is likely to attribute the success of the 'Intimations Ode' to the satisfaction it offers in seeing a sense of entitlement, or self-worth, defended rather than challenged."

1990s critics emphasised individual images within the poem along with Wordsworth's message being the source of the poem's power. In 1991, John Hayden updated Russell Noyes's 1971 biography of Wordsworth and began his analysis of the ode by claiming: "Wordsworth's great 'Ode on Immortality' is not easy to follow nor wholly clear. A basic difficulty of interpretation centers upon what the poet means by 'immortality.'" However, he goes on to declare, "the majority of competent judges acclaim the 'Ode on Immortality' as Wordsworth's most splendid poem. In no other poem are poetic conditions so perfectly fulfilled. There is the right subject, the right imagery to express it, and the right meter and language for both." Thomas McFarland, when emphasising the use of a river as a standard theme in Wordsworth's poems, stated in 1992: "Not only do Wordsworth's greatest statements--'Tintern Abbey', 'The Immortality Ode', 'The Ruined Cottage', 'Michael', the first two books of The Prelude--all overlie a streaming infrashape, but Wordsworth, like the other Romantics, seemed virtually hypnotized by the idea of running water." After analysing the Wordsworth's incorporation of childhood memories into the ode, G. Kim Blank, in 1995, argued, "It is the recognition and finally the acceptance of his difficult feelings that stand behind and in the greatness and power of the Ode, both as a personal utterance and a universal statement. It is no accident that Wordsworth is here most eloquent. Becoming a whole person is the most powerful statement any of us can ever made. Wordsworth in the Ode here makes it for us." In 1997, John Mahoney praised the various aspects of the poem while breaking down its rhythm and style. In particular, he emphasised the poem's full title as "of great importance for all who study the poem carefully" and claimed, "The final stanza is a powerful and peculiarly Wordsworthian valediction."

In the 21st century, the poem was viewed as Wordsworth's best work. Adam Sisman, in 2007, claimed the poem as "one of [Wordsworth's] greatest works". Following in 2008, Paul Fry argued, "Most readers agree that the Platonism of the Intimations Ode is foreign to Wordsworth, and express uneasiness that his most famous poem, the one he always accorded its special place in arranging his successive editions, is also so idiosyncratic." He continued, "As Simplon and Snowdon also suggest, it was a matter of achieving heights (not the depth of 'Tintern Abbey'), and for that reason the metaphor comes easily when one speaks of the Intimations Ode as a high point in Wordsworth's career, to be highlighted in any new addition as a pinnacle of accomplishment, a poem of the transcendental imagination par excellence."

== See also ==
- 1807 in poetry

== In other works ==
=== Literature ===
In Edgar Lee Masters' 1915 book Spoon River Anthology, the character Mrs. Benjamin Pantier mentions the Ode as an indicator of her refinement: "But suppose you are really a lady, and have delicate tastes / And loathe the smell of whiskey and onions / And the rhythm of Wordsworth's Ode runs in your ears..."
