= Resolution and Independence =

Lyric poem by William Wordsworth composed in 1802

"Resolution and Independence" is a lyric poem by the English Romantic poet William Wordsworth, composed in 1802 and published in 1807 in Poems in Two Volumes. The poem contains twenty stanzas written in modified rhyme royal, and describes Wordsworth's encounter with a leech-gatherer near his home in the Lake District of England.

== Overview ==
Stanzas I–III of the poem describe the poet's joy while taking a morning walk after a night of rain.

In stanzas IV–VII, the poet is suddenly beset by anxious thoughts and fears about his own future, as well as the future of all poets, saying "We Poets in our youth begin in gladness; / But thereof come in the end despondency and madness." In Stanza VII, Wordsworth recounts past poets who died at a young age. In line 43, he "thought of Chatterton, the marvellous Boy / The sleepless Soul that perished in his pride", referring to Thomas Chatterton, an 18th-century poet who committed suicide at the age of 17 after duping many in the literary world with his medieval forgeries. In line 45, Wordsworth writes "of Him who walked in glory and in joy / Following his plough, along the mountain-side", a reference to Robert Burns, who died at the age of 37 after an extended illness.

The poem concludes in stanzas VIII–XX with Wordsworth meeting an old, poor leech-gatherer who endures the hardships of his life with patience and acceptance. The poet recovers from his dejection, and views the man as having been sent "To give me human strength, by apt admonishment".

== History and background ==
The poem is based on Wordsworth's actual encounter with a leech-gatherer on 3 October 1800, near his home at Dove Cottage in Grasmere. However, the poem was not written until May 1802, when Wordsworth experienced the "despondency" described in the poem while walking on Barton Fell near Ullswater. It was during this walk that he "[recollected] the emotion in tranquility" and associated the leech-gatherer he had met two years earlier with his current experience. The first version of the poem was written between 3 and 9 May 1802 under the title of "The Leech-Gatherer", but Wordsworth considerably revised the poem during the following months after it was reviewed by his fiancée, Mary Hutchinson, and her sister Sara.

== Parody ==
In the 1871 novel Through the Looking-Glass, Lewis Carroll parodies "Resolution and Independence" with the poem "Haddocks' Eyes".

== See also ==
- 1807 in poetry
