= Poems, in Two Volumes =

Collection of poetry by Wordsworth published in 1807

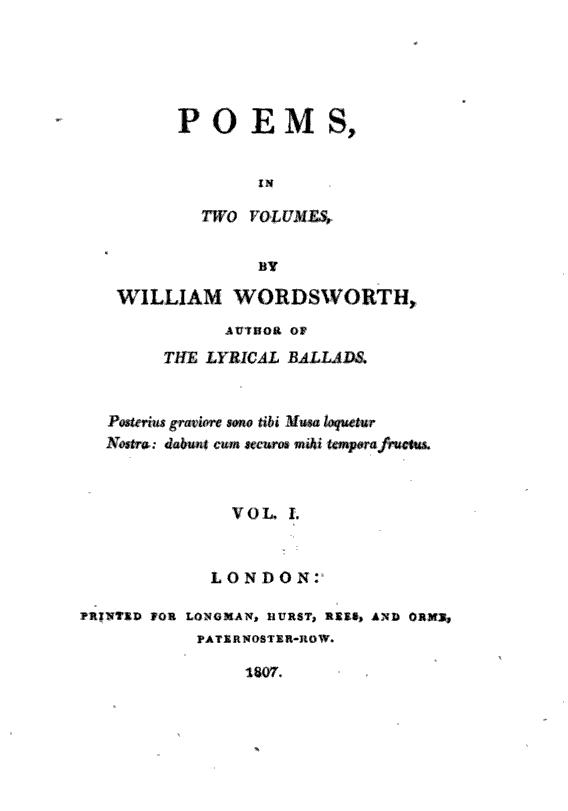
The title page of Poems in Two Volumes

Poems, in Two Volumes is a collection of poetry by English Romantic poet William Wordsworth, published in 1807.

It contains many notable poems, including:

- "Character of the Happy Warrior"
- "Composed upon Westminster Bridge, September 3, 1802"
- "Elegiac Stanzas"
- "I travelled among unknown men"
- "I Wandered Lonely as a Cloud" (sometimes anthologized as "The Daffodils")
- "London, 1802"
- "My Heart Leaps Up"
- "Ode to Duty"
- "Ode: Intimations of Immortality"
- "On the Extinction of the Venetian Republic"
- "Resolution and Independence"
- "The Solitary Reaper"
- "The Sparrow's Nest"
- "The World Is Too Much with Us"
- "To a Butterfly"
- "Yarrow Unvisited"

== Contents ==
The contents of Volume I and Volume II:

=== Volume I ===
- To the Daisy
- Louisa
- Fidelity
- She was a Phantom of delight
- The Redbreast and the Butterfly
- The Sailor's Mother
- To the Small Celandine
- To the same Flower
- Character of the Happy Warrior
- The Horn of Egremont Castle
- The Affliction of Margaret —— of ——
- The Kitten and the falling Leaves
- The Seven Sisters, or the Solitude of Binnorie
- To H.C., six Years old
- Among all lovely things my Love had been
- I travell'd among unknown Men
- Ode to Duty

POEMS, COMPOSED DURING A TOUR, CHIEFLY ON FOOT.

- 1. Beggars
- 2. To a Sky-Lark
- 3. With how sad Steps, O Moon, thou climb'st the Sky
- 4. Alice Fell
- 5. Resolution and Independence

SONNETS

- Prefatory Sonnet

PART THE FIRST—MISCELLANEOUS SONNETS.

- 1.
- 2.
- 3. Composed after a Journey across the Hamilton Hills, Yorkshire
- 4.
- 5. To Sleep
- 6. To Sleep
- 7. To Sleep
- 8.
- 9. To the River Duddon
- 10. From the Italian of Michael Angelo
- 11. From the same
- 12. From the same. To the Supreme Being
- 13. Written in very early Youth
- 14. Composed upon Westminster Bridge, Sept. 3, 1803
- 15.
- 16.
- 17. To ——
- 18.
- 19.
- 20. To the Memory of Raisley Calvert

PART THE SECOND—SONNETS DEDICATED TO LIBERTY. CONTENTS.

- 1. Composed by the Sea-side, near Calais, August, 1802
- 2. Is it a Reed
- 3. To a Friend, composed near Calais, on the Road leading to Ardres, August 7, 1802
- 4.
- 5.
- 6. On the Extinction of the Venetian Republic
- 7. The King of Sweden
- 8. To Toussaint L'Ouverture
- 9.
- 10. Composed in the Valley near Dover, on the Day of Landing
- 11.
- 12. Thought of a Briton on the Subjugation of Switzerland
- 13. Written in London, September, 1802
- 14.
- 15.
- 16.
- 17.
- 18.
- 19.
- 20.
- 21.
- 22.
- 23. To the Men of Kent. October, 1803
- 24.
- 25. Anticipation. October, 1803
- 26.

=== Volume II ===
POEMS WRITTEN DURING A TOUR IN SCOTLAND.

- 1. Rob Roy's Grave
- 2. The solitary Reaper
- 3. Stepping Westward
- 4. Glen-Almain, or the Narrow Glen
- 5. The Matron of Jedborough and her Husband
- 6. To a Highland Girl
- 7. Sonnet
- 8. Address to the Sons of Burns after visiting their Father's Grave, Aug. 14th, 1803
- 9. Yarrow Unvisited

MOODS OF MY OWN MIND.

- 1. To a Butterfly
- 2.
- 3.
- 4.
- 5. Written in March while resting on the Bridge at the Foot of Brother's Water
- 6. The small Celandine]]
- 7. No title (I wandered lonely as a cloud)
- 8.
- 9. The Sparrow's Nest
- 10. Gipsies
- 11. To the Cuckoo
- 12. To a Butterfly
- 13.

THE BLIND HIGHLAND BOY.

- The Blind Highland Boy
- The Green Linnet
- To a Young Lady, who had been reproached for taking long Walks in the Country
- By their floating Mill, &c
- Star-gazers
- Power of Music
- To the Daisy
- To the same Flower
- Incident, characteristic of a favourite Dog,
- which belonged to a Friend of the Author
- Tribute to the Memory of the same Dog
- Sonnet
- Sonnet
- Sonnet
- Sonnet to Thomas Clarkson
- Once in a lonely Hamlet, &c
- Foresight, or the Charge of a Child to his younger Companion
- A Complaint
- I am not One, &c
- Yes! full surely 'twas the Echo, &c
- To the Spade of a Friend
- Song, at the Feast of Brougham Castle
- Lines, composed at Grasmere
- Elegiac Stanzas
- Ode
- Notes

== Critical reception ==
Poems in Two Volumes has been considered to be the peak of Wordsworth's power, and of his popularity. However, it was poorly reviewed by Wordsworth's contemporaries, including Lord Byron, whom Wordsworth would come to despise. Byron said of the volume, in one of its first reviews, "Mr. W[ordsworth] ceases to please, ... clothing [his ideas] in language not simple, but puerile". Wordsworth himself wrote ahead to soften the thoughts of The Critical Review, hoping his friend Wrangham would push a softer approach. He succeeded in preventing a known enemy from writing the review, but it didn't help; as Wordsworth himself said, it was a case of "Out of the frying pan, into the fire". Of any positives within Poems in Two Volumes, perceived masculinity in "The Happy Warrior" was one. "I Wandered Lonely as a Cloud" couldn't have been further from it. Wordsworth took the reviews stoically.
