= Curtal sonnet =

Type of sonnet

The curtal sonnet is a form invented by Gerard Manley Hopkins, and used in three of his poems.

It is an eleven-line (or, more accurately, ten-and-a-half-line) sonnet, but rather than the first eleven lines of a standard sonnet it has precisely the structure of a Petrarchan sonnet in which each component is three-quarters of its original length. Thus the octave of a sonnet becomes a sestet and the sestet a quatrain plus an additional "tail piece". That is, the first eight lines of a sonnet are translated into the first six lines of a curtal sonnet and the last six lines of a sonnet are translated into the last four and a half lines of a curtal sonnet. Hopkins describes the last line as half a line, though in fact it can be shorter than half of one of Hopkins's standard sprung rhythm lines. In the preface to his Poems (1876–89), Hopkins describes the relationship between the Petrarchan and curtal sonnets mathematically; if the Petrarchan sonnet can be described by the equation 8+6=14 then, he says, the curtal sonnet would be:

12/2 + 9/2 = 21/2 = 10 1/2.

Hopkins's only examples of the form are "Pied Beauty", "Peace", and "Ash Boughs". "Pied Beauty" reads as follows, showing the proportional relation to the Petrarchan sonnet (not included in the original: the only indication of the form is in the preface). Accents indicate stressed syllables:

Glory be to God for dappled things—

For skies of couple-colour as a brinded cow;

For rose-moles all in stipple upon trout that swim;

Fresh-firecoal chestnut-falls; finches' wings;

Landscape plotted and pieced—fold, fallow, and plough;

And áll trádes, their gear and tackle and trim.

All things counter, original, spare, strange;

Whatever is fickle, freckled (who knows how?)

With swift, slow; sweet, sour; adazzle, dim;

He fathers-forth whose beauty is past change:

Praise him.

12/2 = 6

9/2 = 4 1/2

Hopkins's account of the form comes from the preface to his Poems (1876–89). Critics are generally in agreement that the curtal sonnet does not so much constitute a new form as an interpretation of sonnet form as Hopkins believed it to be; as Elisabeth Schneider argues, the curtal sonnet reveals Hopkins's intense interest in the mathematical proportions of all sonnets. Lois Pitchford examines all three poems in detail in relation to the form as Hopkins imagined it.

The form has been used occasionally since, but often as a novelty, in contrast to Hopkins's quite serious use. Poets Lucy Newlyn and R. H. W. Dillard have written examples that serve as explications of the form.

== See also ==
- Caudate sonnet
