= English Romantic sonnets =

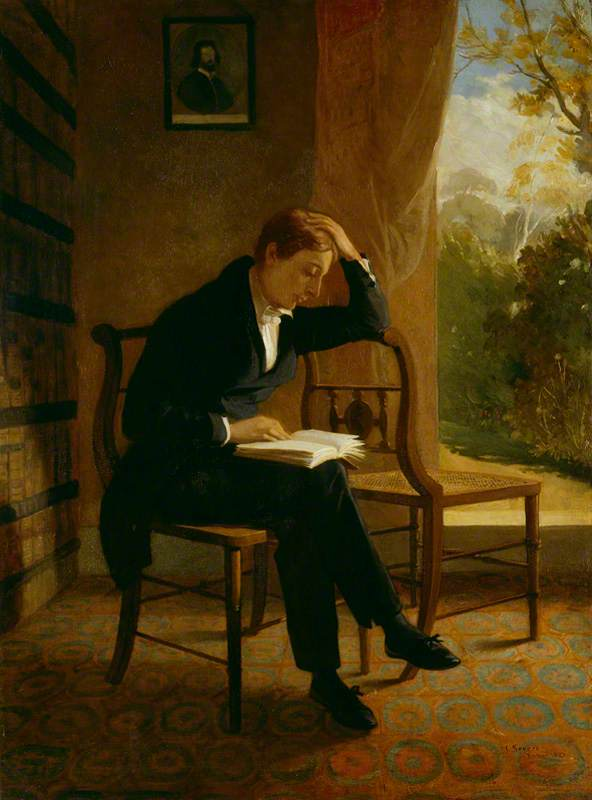
"On First Looking into Chapman's Homer", a portrait of John Keats by Joseph Severn

The sonnet was a popular form of poetry during the Romantic period: William Wordsworth wrote 523, John Keats 67, Samuel Taylor Coleridge 48, and Percy Bysshe Shelley 18. But in the opinion of Lord Byron sonnets were “the most puling, petrifying, stupidly platonic compositions”, at least as a vehicle for love poetry, and he wrote no more than five.

John Clare, whose early published poetry falls within this period, is a special case. Separate sections of sonnets appeared in all three of his published collections: 21 sonnets in Poems Descriptive of Rural Scenery (1820); 60 in The Village Minstrel (1821); and 86 in The Rural Muse (1835). Many more remained unpublished.

Variations of both the Petrarchan sonnet and the Shakespearean sonnet were employed by the Romantic poets in the wake of the late 18th century revivalists of the form, who had applied the sonnet to a wider variety of subjects than in previous centuries. Experiments in making the sonnet more expressive and more adaptable still, begun by the later Romantic poets, were continued after their time.

== Background ==
The sonnet had been adopted into English poetry during Tudor times, notably by Sir Thomas Wyatt and Henry Howard, Earl of Surrey, who took Petrarch as their model and translated or adapted several of his sonnets into English. The form was taken up by a host of other poets over the next century, for the most part composing long amatory sequences, although at the end of this period John Milton had demonstrated the sonnet’s adaptability to a much wider range of subject matter. After him, scarcely any sonnets were written until the form’s revival during the second half of the 18th century. For that generation, Milton's example was the one generally followed, although the long history of the Italian sonnet was not forgotten, especially among women writers. Charlotte Smith incorporated a few translations from Petrarch among her Elegiac Sonnets, while Anna Seward's sonnet "Petrarch to Vaucluse" is an imitation written in the poet's name.

== The age of sensibility ==
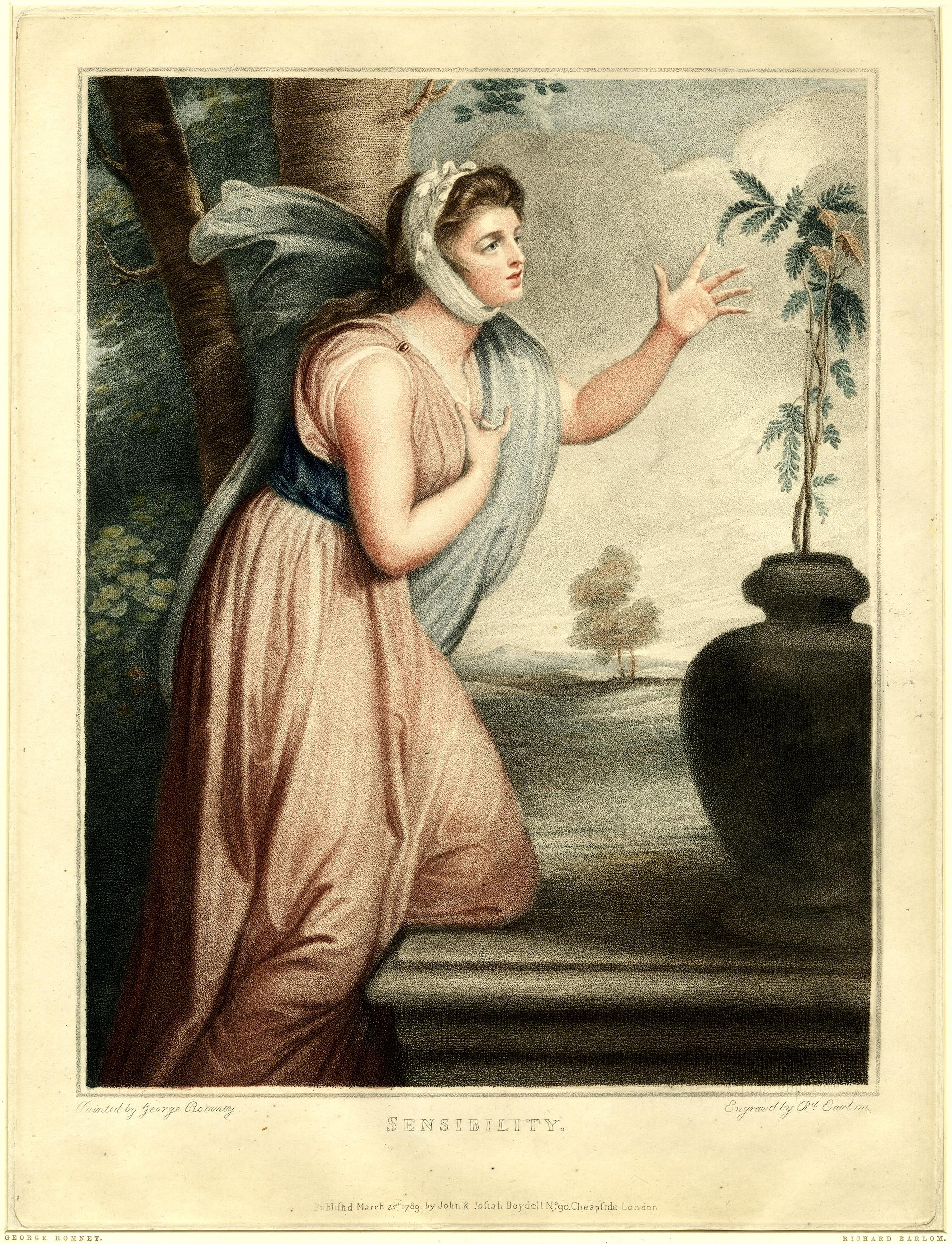
Emma Hamilton demonstrating sensibility in the natural world, a 1789 print after George Romney

The period of literary transition between Augustan poetry and Romantic poetry has sometimes been described as the age of sensibility. During this time poets looked to the past for different literary models, subjects, and even diction. Personal feelings were emphasised, although these were often of a melancholy or sentimental cast. This was the period when the sonnet was rediscovered and developed, not only by younger men associated with the universities but also by an emerging generation of female writers, as an ideal vehicle for the lyrical expression of emotion. The revival was not without stylistic skirmishes, however. Charlotte Smith's doleful Elegiac Sonnets were dismissed by Anna Seward as "everlasting lamentables" and "hackneyed scraps of dismality". Coleridge parodied the styles of various contemporary writers in three "Sonnets attempted in the[ir] manner" (published under the name of Nehemiah Higginbottom in 1797); and the youthful Byron addressed mocking quatrains "To the author of a sonnet beginning 'Sad is my verse, you say, and yet no tear'".

There was also disagreement over which form of the sonnet was the best model to follow. That chosen by Charlotte Smith and her followers was the Shakespearean sonnet. Anna Seward and Mary Robinson, on the other hand, championed the Petrarchan sonnet as the only 'legitimate' form. In the preface to her sequence Sappho and Phaon: in a series of legitimate sonnets (1796), Robinson denounced the undisciplined effusions filling the literary reviews as "non-descript ephemera from the heated brains of self-important poetasters". Seward, on her side, appealed to the critical dictates of Boileau. His L'Art poétique (1674) had been translated by William Soame and published with John Dryden's revisions in 1683 as The Art of Poetry. There Apollo Musagetes, god of poetry, institutes strict measures for the writing of sonnets, forbidding any redundancy, in order to confound contemporary "Scriblers":

A faultless Sonnet, finish’d thus, would be
Worth tedious volumes of loose Poetry.

In her distillation of the same passage, Seward similarly recommends restraint and discipline over the "trite ideas thrown into loose verse" that illegitimately pass as poetry.

Wordsworth's sonnet "Nuns fret not at their Convent’s narrow room" echoes the same reasoning. Written after the poet's adoption of the Miltonic form of the sonnet (based on Petrarch’s), it reasons that the form's restriction "no prison is", but instead a solace for those "who have felt the weight of too much liberty". Wordsworth's earliest sonnet had been the lachrymose "On seeing Miss Helen Maria Williams Weep at a Tale of Distress" (1787). Convinced now of the wider possibilities and subject matter of the Miltonic example, the poetic lead he gave after 1802 was "in many ways a deliberate erasure of the sonnet of Sensibility", setting the style for the new century.

== Themes ==
=== Politics ===
Sonnets written on political themes towards the end of the 18th century arise as much from sensibility as from ideology. The six Shakespearean sonnets that Robert Southey devoted to the slave trade in 1794 are so many exercises in emotionality and earned their author the satirical address in the sixth number of the Anti-Jacobin Review beginning "Wearisome sonneteer, feeble and querulous". Coleridge assumes something of the same emotional tone in the series of "Sonnets on Eminent Characters" published in The Morning Chronicle between 1794-5. Also Shakespearean in form, they deploy the poetic diction of a bygone age in such terms as 'swart' and 'joyance'. On the other hand, Coleridge has learned from Milton's example how to transcend mere emotion and allow a public voice to emerge as he comments on contemporary issues.

Wordsworth's Miltonic manner of a few years later is announced in "London, 1802", where the spirit of the poet is appealed to as the necessary remedy to the race of "selfish men" of his time. The sonnet is written in the Petrarchan form and was subsequently collected among the "Poems Dedicated to National Independence and Liberty" written in response to events at home and abroad during the long series of Napoleonic Wars. In Wordsworth's eyes, Milton's "soul was like a star, and dwelt apart", independent of the corrupting pressures of the age. But in the eyes of the second generation of Romantic poets, Wordsworth had by their time succumbed to conservative pressures and his poem on Milton became the model for Shelley's own expression of regret at the poet's fall from grace in the sonnet "To Wordsworth" (1814–15):

Thou wert as a lone star…
Above the blind and battling multitude:
In honoured poverty thy voice did weave
Songs consecrate to truth and liberty, -
Deserting these, thou leavest me to grieve.

So repressive had the regime become just a few years later that Shelley's denunciatory "England in 1819" was unable to be published until 1839. By this time, too, Byron had awoken to the possibilities of the sonnet as a channel for political comment and addressed one of his own "To George the Fourth", also in 1819. A little earlier, Keats had celebrated the return from prison of Leigh Hunt, a casualty of the libel laws, in a sonnet invoking "daring Milton" as one of Hunt's companions in custody. And in the international sphere, Keats was also to follow the example of Coleridge and Hunt in addressing a sonnet "To Kosciusko", the Polish freedom fighter, looking forward to the "happy day when some good spirit walks upon the earth" and Kosciusko's patriotic worth will be properly appreciated.

=== Nature ===
In 1796, Coleridge had printed a pamphlet anthology of sonnets by himself and his contemporaries, designed to be bound into the fourth edition of the Sonnets with Other Poems of William Bowles. In the preface to this, Coleridge defined the sonnet as "a small poem in which some lonely feeling is developed…deduced from, and associated with, the scenery of nature," the object of which was to "create a sweet and indissoluble union between the intellectual and the material world". These were sentiments he shared with Bowles himself, who described his own sonnets as "Poetic trifles from solitary rambles whilst chewing the cud of sweet and bitter fancy"; and partially echoed by Anna Seward, for whom "The legitimate sonnet generally consists of one thought, regularly pursued to the close".

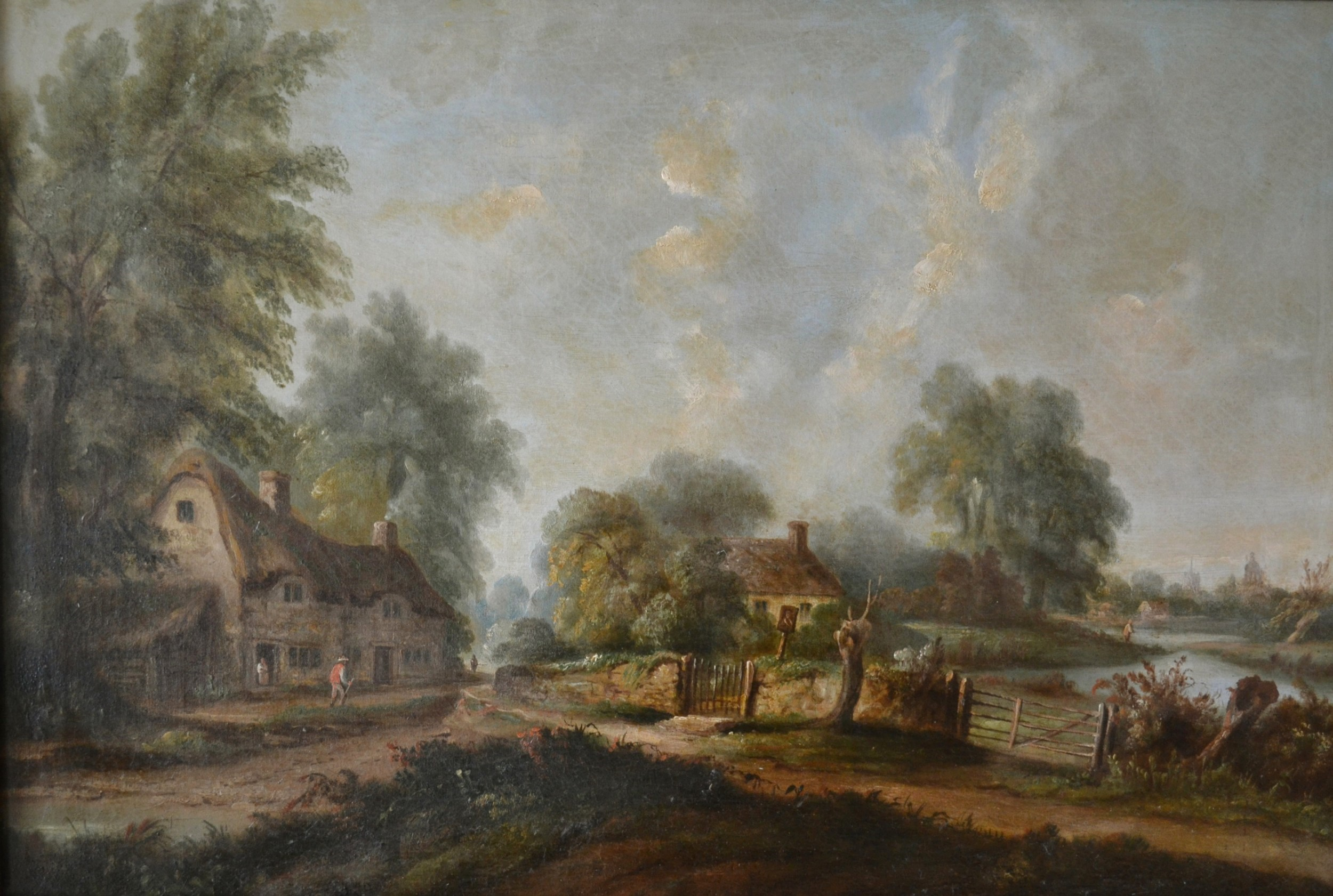
The River Cherwell, near Oxford, manner of David Cox Snr, Oil On Canvas

Celebration of natural scenery had been a constant in English poetry, but choosing a river as the focus within it suited the smaller scale of the sonnet. At first there was an awkward transition from the conventions and diction of 18th century topographical poetry. Charlotte Smith's "To the River Arun" recalls the connection of "Otway's plaintive strain", "Collins' pow'rful shell", and the more recent example of William Hayley, with her subject. William Bowles' sonnets on the Itchen and the Cherwell bring him melancholy recollections of his personal past. Where such associations are absent, as in the sonnets "To the River Wenbeck" and "To the River Tweed", it is the consolatory power of nature, not altogether absent from the others, which is emphasised. Regretful comparison between past and present had also characterized Thomas Warwick's own sonnet on the Cherwell. There, after invoking the distant towers of Oxford as seen from its banks, and his youthful pastimes there, his attention shifts to the temptations that now threaten his former innocence. Thomas Warton's "To The River Lodon" likewise reflects on the lapse between youth and poetic maturity. In all of these, as suggested in the prefaces by Coleridge and others, the movement is from the initial observation in the octave to a clinching moral or personal reflection in the final lines of the sestet.

Later on, Wordsworth followed the example of Bowles in combining sonnets among other lyrical effusions in the various records of his travel tours during the course of the first four decades of the 19th century. Of these the most ambitious was the unified series of 33 sonnets in "The River Duddon" (1820), which follows the moorland course of the river down to the sea. Transcending the limitations of the form, according to Wordsworth's note on the work, the sonnets taken "together may be considered as a poem". In addition, by keeping his authorial presence at a minimum, he is able to avoid the intrusive strain of personal memory and melancholy which had characterized the river sonnets of his predecessors and make of this river a more effective symbol of the flow of time. It has been suggested that Wordsworth is also maintaining the durability of the sonnet itself as a poetic form by closing the additional sonnet that he added later to conclude the sequence with the declaration

Still glides the stream, and shall for ever glide;
The Form remains, the Function never dies.

On a much smaller scale, Louisa Anne Meredith, one of whose books was dedicated to Wordsworth, also combined a sequence of sonnets into a single concentrated meditation on the theme of transience in her "Tintern Abbey in four sonnets". In this case, it is by the intervention of herself as the human intermediary that the place's history is called back "from darkness and decay".

=== Religious sequences ===
Among the themes that the example of Milton's sonnets made available to those who followed him in the 18th century was the mixing of religious with personal reflections. It was his example that the clergyman poet William Mason followed on reaching his 70th birthday, beginning with a memory of Milton's sonnet on his 23rd birthday and modulating into a prayer of gratitude for his own longer span.

Religion was not a prominent sonnet theme, however, until Wordsworth's series of 132 "Ecclesiastical Sonnets", begun in 1821 and added to over the following decades. A history of the Church in England from the earliest arrival of Christianity, and written from an Anglican point of view, it has the characteristics of a unified work that approaches the epic.

The bulk of Wordsworth's religious work had already been published in the 1827 edition of his collected works by the time that Felicia Hemans paid him a visit in 1830. Later she went on to write a series of her own in the 15 sonnets titled Female Characters of Scripture (1833). This was an innovative work, going beyond its unity of theme to suggest that the women concerned had voices and personalities of their own that transcended the male narrative to which their characters had hitherto been subordinated. As much a special interpretation of her subject as was Wordsworth's sequence, it goes further in heralding the way in which Victorian literature was to build on the Romantic achievement while advancing into radically new territory.

=== Technological advances ===
The Romantic age spanned a period of technological advance which, for all that the main focus of attention then was on nature, finds its place in their writing. Anna Seward, on revisiting her former home, had already regretted the scars left by furnace and mine on the already desolate moors about Eyam. But if the welcome she gave to the aeronautical balloon in her sonnet 45 was guarded, that had more to do with its country of origin and distrust of France's revolutionary experiments. For all that, knowledge was advanced and Seward noted the public enthusiasm with which the possibilities offered by the new invention was greeted.

A later acknowledgement of the scientific addition to human knowledge occurs in Keats' sonnet "On First Looking into Chapman's Homer" (1816), where the poet compares the effect on him of that encounter as like Herschel's discovery of the planet Uranus. Wordsworth was similarly welcoming of progress in the sonnet "Steamboats, Viaducts, and Railways" (1833), seeing them as a sign of man's questing spirit, despite their intrusion upon "the loveliness of nature".

But while Wordsworth posed as friendly to modern technological advances, he was resistant to social change made in their name. After he had become a public figure as poet laureate and a champion of his neighbouring landowners, the poet assumed the lead in the attack "On the Projected Kendal and Windermere Railway". The very winds and waters are exhorted to protest against the intrusion of the line so close to his grounds at Rydal Mount, but the sonnet's real target is as much the values of middle class utilitarianism. There is a similar technological and class ambivalence about the 1846 sonnet on "Illustrated Books and Newspapers". Its argument is that, while the invention of printing had been a step upward from manuscript culture, "this vile abuse of pictured page" as represented by the popular press is an intellectual retreat to infantilism.

== Sonnet discipline ==
In Wordsworth's opinion, poets should write sonnets to add variety to their work and keep them out of the trap of routine. John Clare, too, believed the sonnet gave him scope to annotate the natural themes that took his fancy in a disciplined way. A later editor has surmised that its compact form represented for him "a kind of self-discipline, forcing him to concentrate and obtain his effects with economy, where in other poems he allowed himself to wander a little aimlessly". But younger poets meanwhile took advantage of the form's restriction to engage in friendly competition. At the end of 1816, John Keats and Leigh Hunt set themselves the task of each writing a sonnet "On the Grasshopper and Cricket" in a quarter of an hour. In the following year Shelley and Horace Smith competed together after visiting the British Museum, from which sonnets on Ozymandias resulted. And early in 1818, Shelley, Keats and Hunt took "The Nile" as their subject for sonnets published separately soon after.

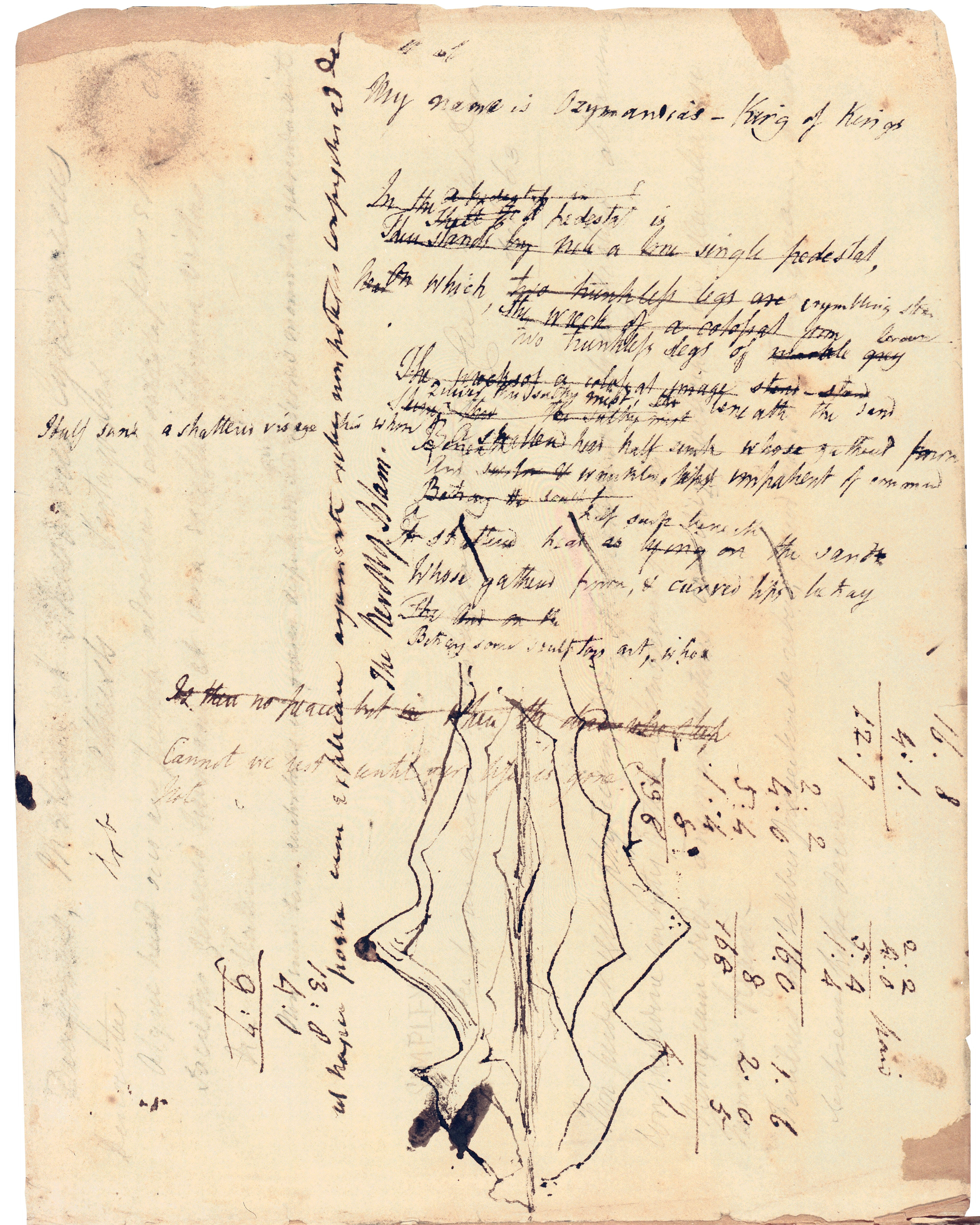
A draft of Ozymandias by Percy Bysshe Shelley

=== Form ===
The two classic forms that the Romantics used the most were the Petrarchan sonnet and the Shakespearean sonnet. The Petrarchan or Italian form usually follows a rhyme scheme of ABBA ABBA CDE CDE. The poem is usually divided into two sections with the first eight lines, an octave, and the last six, a sestet. There is usually a turn in the poem around line nine. The Shakespearean form has a rhyme scheme of ABAB CDCD EFEF GG. The end rhyming couplet is often used to turn the idea that has been building through the poem.

The Romantics played with these forms. Since the general topic and focus of the sonnet shifted in this era, it makes sense that the form would also change to mirror the content. A sonnet like Shelley’s Ozymandias uses neither a complete Shakespearian nor Petrarchan rhyme scheme. The pattern of AB AB AC DC ED EF EF, is no less a sonnet than those of conventional patterns. The movement away from set structures could be to mirror the feelings of detachment in the poem.

The ode had been a favorite form for all the Romantics because its irregular lineation adapted in many ways to the speaker and subject. However, Shelley's adaptation into his "Ode to the West Wind" of the sonnet form gave him the best of both worlds, allowing him emotional and grammatical shifts that typify the blowing wind while holding its energy in check by the discipline of a regular form. In this case there is a double adaptation, using the terza rima pattern of successive tercets brought to a disciplined close in a rhyming couplet: ABA BCB CDC DED EE; this novel form is then deployed in the five sonnet-like stanzas of which the poem is constructed.
