= Susan Evance =

English romantic poet (fl. 1808 – 1818)

Susan Evance (later Hooper, fl. 1808 – 1818) was an English romantic poet. Her poems focus on sentiment, often with melancholy themes, and also reveal her religious convictions and socially progressive ideals. She is noted for her use of the sonnet form, following the legacy of Charlotte Smith as part of the English Romantic revival of that form. Her sonnets on decay, especially on the ruin of Netley Abbey, have been considered Gothic in tone.

Most of Evance’s biographical details are inferred from her poems: she had sisters and a brother in the navy; and she was said to be young when her first book was published. Between the publications of her first and second books she married a Mr Hooper. By 1818 she seems to have been a mother.

She published Poems... Selected from her Earliest Productions, to Those of the Present Year in 1808 and A Poem Occasioned by the Cessation of Public Mourning for Her Royal Highness the Princess Charlotte; together with Sonnets and Other Productions in 1818. She also contributed to A Sequel to the Poetical Monitor, consisting of pieces select and origin adapted to improve the minds and manners of young persons in 1811.
