= Volta (literature) =

Shift or point of dramatic change in literature

The volta is a rhetorical shift or dramatic change in thought and/or emotion. Turns are seen in all types of written poetry. In the last two decades, the volta has become conventionally used as a word for this, stemming supposedly from technique specific mostly to sonnets. Volta is not, in fact, a term used by many earlier critics when they address the idea of a turn in a poem, and they usually are not discussing the sonnet form. It is a common Italian word more often used of the idea of a time or an occasion than a turnabout or swerve.

== Terminology ==
The turn in poetry has gone by many names. In "The Poem in Countermotion", the final chapter of How Does a Poem Mean?, John Ciardi speaks thus of the "fulcrum" in relation to the non-sonnet poem "O western wind" (O Western Wind/when wilt thou blow/The small rain down can rain//Christ! my love were in my arms/and I in my bed again): 'The first two lines are a cry of anguish to the western wind (in England, the wind of spring). The lament issues without any statement of cause for the speaker's anguish. The second two lines snap off that generalized lament and utter an angry and specific protest. The poet's tone has undergone an emphatic change.' Ciardi does not use the term "volta". In The Poet's Art, M.L. Rosenthal employs two different terms for different kinds of turns: "gentle modulations, or at the furthest extreme, wrenching turns of emphasis or focus or emotional pitch (torques)". Hank Lazer primarily refers to the turn as a "swerve", asking, "Is there a describable lyricism of swerving? For those poems for which the swerve, the turn, the sudden change in direction are integral, can we begin to articulate a precise appreciation? Is there a describable and individualistic lyricism of swerving?" What Leslie Ullman calls the "center" of a poem largely is the poem's turn.

== Importance ==
Author and historian Paul Fussell in a book in which he never uses the word 'volta' talks generally of the poetic turn as "indispensable". He states further that "the turn is the dramatic and climactic center of the poem, the place where the intellectual or emotional method of release first becomes clear and possible. Surely no sonnet succeeds as a sonnet that does not execute at the turn something analogous to the general kinds of 'release' with which the reader's muscles and nervous system are familiar."

According to poet-critic Phillis Levin, "We could say that for the sonnet, the volta is the seat of its soul." Additionally, Levin states that "the arrangement of lines into patterns of sound serves a function we could call architectural, for these various acoustical partitions accentuate the element that gives the sonnet its unique force and character: the volta, the 'turn' that introduces into the poem a possibility for transformation, like a moment of grace".

Called the volta in sonnets, the turn is a vital part of almost all poems. Poet-critic Ellen Bryant Voigt states, "The sonnet's volta, or 'turn'...has become an inherent expectation for most short lyric poems." Poet-critic T.S. Eliot (in his essay on Andrew Marvell, where he discusses longer poems than sonnets and does not use the term voltà) calls the turn in general "one of the most important means of poetic effect since Homer." Kim Addonizio refers to the turn as "[t]he leap from one synapse to another, one thought to a further thought, one level of understanding or questioning to being in the presence of the mystery". In "Levels and Opposites: Structure in Poetry", Randall Jarrell says that "a successful poem starts in one position and ends at a very different one, often a contradictory or opposite one; yet there has been no break in the unity of the poem". Such a transition is executed by the turn.

In Veering: A Theory of Literature, Nicholas Royle states, "Nowhere is [the] haphazard and disruptive strangeness of veering perhaps more evident than in the space of literature. Indeed...in a sense this is what literature is." And one central aspect of Royle's veering is the turn. Royle states, "'Veering' involves contemplating all sorts of turns, funny and otherwise." Additionally, he notes, "To engage with the verb 'to veer' is to find ourselves in Latin, French and other so-called foreign waters. We are already adrift. We must turn and turn about. Besides 'veer' itself and other words linked to the French virer, for example, there are all the words related to the Latin verb vertere ('to turn')...Then there are the inexhaustible riches of the word 'turn' (from the Latin tornare, 'to turn in a lathe', from tornus, 'turner's wheel', from Greek tornos, 'lathe')..."

== Types ==
In his essay "Trust the Turn: Focusing the Revision Process in Poetry", Theune suggest that there are a number of poems that can show the turn: "...ironic poems turn from set-up to punch line, emblem poems turn from description to meditation, and retrospective-prospective poems turn from past to present or future".

Poet-critic Ellen Bryant Voigt, in her essay "The Flexible Lyric" suggests that all kinds of poems turn and these poems can be classified according to the ways they turn. Poetic turns can be narrative or dramatic just as a turn might signal a move from premise to conclusion, a turn might also consist of a transition from one emotional state to another.

=== Ironic ===
The ironic structure is a two-part structure which turns from making an assertion to undercutting that assertion, or pulling the rug out from underneath what (one had thought) had been established in the poem. As discussed by Christopher Bakken in "The Ironic Structure", "The ironic structure—with its building up and knocking down, its dreaming and waking—becomes the perfect instrument for a great Romantic ironist like Lord Byron, whose long poem "Don Juan" exemplifies this complicated problem.

One example of an ironic turn is "Dusk" by Rae Armantrout.

=== Emblem ===
The emblem structure is a two-part structure that turns from an organized description of an object to a meditation on, a consideration of, the meaning of that object.

One example of an emblem turn is "A Green Crab's Shell" by Mark Doty.

=== Concessional ===
The concessional structure is a two-part structure that turns from making concessions (that is, admitting the problems or difficulties in the argument one wants to make) to then, in fact, making the argument.

One example of a concessional turn is "Yet Do I Marvel" by Countee Cullen.

=== Retrospective-prospective ===
The retrospective-prospective structure is a two-part structure that begins with a consideration of past events and then turns to look ahead to the future or else look a present situation differently.

One example of a retrospective-prospective turn is I Wandered Lonely as a Cloud (Daffodils) by William Wordsworth.

=== Elegy ===
The elegiac mode has three kinds of structures: one with a turn from grief to consolation; one with a turn from grief to the refusal of consolation; and one from grief to deeper grief.

One example of an elegiac turn (grief to consolation) is "Shell" by Harriet Brown.

=== Dialectical argument ===
According to poet John Beer, the dialectical argument structure is essentially a three-part structure. It turns from thesis (one argumentative position) to antithesis (a counterpoint to the thesis) to a synthesis, which combines the two seemingly opposing views.

One example of a poem with a dialectical argument is "Some Days" by Billy Collins.

=== Descriptive meditating ===
According to poet Corey Marks, the descriptive-meditative structure is a kind of dramatic monologue that has three parts: it opens with the description of a scene, then (often due to an external trigger) turns to an interior meditation (for example, the expression and/or consideration of memories, concerns, anticipation), and then turns to a re-description of the scene, a scene that now seems different due to the changed mindset of the poem's speaker.

One example of a poem with a descriptive meditating turn is "Tintern Abbey" by William Wordsworth.

=== Mid-course ===
According to poet Jerry Harp, a poem that employs a mid-course turn is one that employs a particularly sharp, radical turn.

One example of a poem with a mid-course turn is "Old Man Traveling" by William Wordsworth.

=== Dolphin turn ===
According to Peter Sacks in "You Only Guide Me by Surprise": Poetry and the Dolphin's Turn, the dolphin's turn is "a transformative veering from one course to another, a way of being drawn off track to an unexpected destination..." Sacks adds: "[T]his turn is paradigmatic for the transportation system of poetry itself, both in its technical "versing", and in its thematic and figural changes." The dolphin is associated with such turning, of course, because it is a creature that itself is always transgressing boundaries, leaping and diving. The dolphin turn "breaks the surface between two elements, perhaps as the poem breaks from silence to sound and back, line after line, leaping and turning through what differentiates poetry from prose: its more frequent encounters with wordlessness, its high quota of turns, both of speech and thought, and of actual lineation, its navigating according to its own frequency even as it finds its course, responsively, by echolocation, by soundings."

Some examples of the dolphin turn include:

- "Homeric Hymn to Pythian Apollo "
- Rainer Maria Rilke's "Delphine"
- Osip Mandelstam's "There is no need for speech"

== By genre ==
=== Haiku ===
Haiku typically involve juxtaposition, or turning, which often occurs through a pivot word—a word that causes the poem to change directions, known in Japanese poetics as the kireji. This is discussed in Lee Gurga's Haiku: A Poet's Guide. Betty Drevniok describes the haiku's turn in Aware: A Haiku Primer by explaining that haiku must be written using the principles of comparison, contrast, or association. She says, "This technique provides the pivot on which the reader's thought turns and expands."

=== Sijo ===
The sijo, a Korean poem of 43 to 45 syllables, traditionally contains a turn in the third line which moves away from the theme developed in the first two lines.

=== Sonnets ===
A turn in a sonnet is called a volta. A vital part of virtually all sonnets, the volta is most frequently encountered at the end of the octave (first eight lines in Petrarchan or Spenserian sonnets), or the end of the twelfth line in Shakespearean sonnets, but can occur anywhere in the sonnet.

==== The Petrarchan volta ====
According to Paul Fussell, "The standard way of constructing a Petrarchan sonnet is to project the subject in the first quatrain; to develop or complicate it in the second; then to execute, at the beginning of the sestet, the turn which will open up for solution the problem advanced by the octave, or which will ease the load of idea or emotion borne by the octave, or which will release the pressure accumulated in the octave. The octave and the sestet conduct actions which are analogous to the actions of inhaling and exhaling, or of contraction and release in the muscular system. The one builds up the pressure, the other releases it; and the turn is the dramatic and climactic center of the poem, the place where the intellectual or emotional method of release first becomes clear and possible. From line 9 it is usually plain sailing down to the end of the sestet and the resolution of the experience."

According to poet-critic Eavan Boland, "The original form of the sonnet, the Petrarchan, made a shadow play of eight lines against six. Of all the form's claims, this may be the most ingenious. The octave sets out the problems, the perceptions, the wishes of the poet. The sestet does something different: it makes a swift, wonderfully compact turn on the hidden meanings of but and yet and wait for a moment. The sestet answers the octave, but neither politely nor smoothly. And this simple engine of proposition and rebuttal has allowed the sonnet over centuries, in the hands of very different poets, to replicate over and over again the magic of inner argument."

==== The Shakespearean volta ====
According to Stephen Burt and David Mikics, in Shakespeare's sonnets, "the octave-sestet division is overshadowed by three distinct and equal blocks, the quatrains—and by the couplet that looks back upon the sonnet's action, often with acerbic, epigrammatic terseness or sweeping judgement". Another description of the Shakespearean volta comes from Helen Vendler in her book, The Art of Shakespeare's Sonnets, where the author states, "the couplet—placed not as resolution (which is the function of Q3) but as coda—can then stand in any number of relations (summarizing, ironic, expansive) to the preceding argument. The gradually straitened possibilities as the speaker advances in his considerations give the Shakespearean sonnet a funnel-shape, narrowing in Q3 to a vortex of condensed perceptual and intellectual force, and either constricting or expanding the vortex via couplet."

== Scholarship ==
Despite the presence of turns throughout the history of poetry, the poetic turn has only been critically and explicitly analyzed in recent years. Michael Theune's Structure & Surprise: Engaging Poetic Turns is the first book which directly addresses and discusses the effects of the poetic turn. This collection of critical essays specifically discusses seven types of poetic turns, including the ironic, emblematic, concessional, retrospective-prospective, elegiacal, dialectic, and descriptive-meditative turns. In addition, the book highlights specific characteristics of the turn, emphasizing that poems can turn radically mid-course or appear subtly in "difficult" poetry. Each chapter describes a type of turn, provides brief historical background, and identifies and explores several poems which exemplify that type of turn. By discussing how the turn creates movement, power, or surprise within the poem, this in-depth investigation encourages a more complete reading of poetry. Michael Theune also writes that by recognizing and understanding the turn, poets can revise their poems so they "begin to embody the power, mystery, seductiveness, and grace of great poetry without either becoming unclear and lapsing into disarray or else becoming overly clear by incorporating excessive explanation."

Poets Maureen McLane, Ron Padgett, Robert Pinsky, Kay Ryan, and Susan Steward participated on a panel, called "Twisting and Turning", at the Academy of American Poets Poets Forum on November 8, 2008. Maureen McLane published a round-up discussion of this event called "Twisting and Turning": "A Divagation Prompted by the Poets Forum Panel of November 8, 2008". "Twisting and Turning" begins by referencing the sonnet's turn, which McLane calls "only the most conspicuous example of the formal and cognitive turns a poem may enact". But then it leaps out to consider, or rather mention, all the various kinds of turns there could potentially be in a poem. McLane states, "One could, of course, explore poetic turns at multiple levels: morphemic, lexical, phrasal, tropological, conceptual, structural, generic, transmedial. We might consider how poetry turns away from or turns toward their various inheritances; how bilingual or multilingual poets turn their poems through various linguistic and semantic and cultural grids. From a certain vantage, of course, there is nothing that is not a turn in poetry: The very word verse comes from versus, 'turn' in Latin."

In "How We Value Contemporary Poetry: An Empirical Inquiry", Bob Broad and Michael Theune find that some of their study's participants value poems with "a sort of development or shape that moves with control to negotiate the poem's risk, while incorporating surprise and build and turns to arrive at an ending". They go on to state that "[t]he assessment that a poem has build—which, along with the turn, is a term designating a major shift in rhetorical or dramatic progress of a poem—is powerful: such a development is viewed as rare but valuable, helping a poem to overcome other shortcomings".

In a section called "Rhetorical Structure and Strategy", in the chapter "Syntax and Rhetorical Structure: Words in Order and Disorder", Annie Finch writes, "Every time you write a poem, and probably before you even begin, you make a myriad of even more fundamental choices about its rhetorical stance and structure. Many of these choices are unconscious, based on ideas of 'what a poem is' that you have absorbed long before. To make these choices conscious, at least once in a while, can be refreshing and even eye-opening." Finch then offers a list of questions to ask regarding a poem's rhetorical structure and strategy, the last of which asks, "And finally, what are the rhetorical turns taken in the poem? How does the poem shape itself so that, when one has finished reading, one feels the poem is over, that something has happened, that something has changed?"

In "The Non-Turning of Recent American Poetry", Michael Theune argues that some recent works of poetry writing pedagogy do not pay enough attention to the vital turn.
