= Jacques de Billy =

French Jesuit mathematician

For the English patristic scholar and Benedictine abbot, see Jacques de Billy (abbot) (1535–1581).

Jacques de Billy (March 18, 1602 – January 14, 1679) was a French Jesuit mathematician. Born in Compiègne, he subsequently entered the Society of Jesus. From 1629 to 1630, Billy taught mathematics at the Jesuit College at Pont-à-Mousson. He was still studying theology at this time. From 1631 to 1633, Billy taught mathematics at the Jesuit college at Rheims. From 1665 to 1668 he was professor of mathematics at the Jesuit college at Dijon. One of his pupils there was Jacques Ozanam. Billy also taught in Grenoble. He also served as rector of a number of Jesuit Colleges in Châlons-en-Champagne, Langres and in Sens.

The mathematician Claude Gaspard Bachet de Méziriac, who had been a pupil of Billy's at Rheims, became a close friend. Billy maintained a correspondence with the mathematician Pierre de Fermat. He died January 14, 1679 in Dijon, France.

== Work and legacy ==
Jacques de Billy wrote multiple books on mathematics. In 1637, he published his first book called Abregé des Preceptes d’Algebre. This book helped teach basic principles and rules of algebra. In 1643, he published his second book called Nova Geometriae Clavis Alegrba, which was designed as a way to help solve geometric problems using algebra. French mathematician Bachet introduced Billy to indeterminate analysis at the Jesuit College at Rheims. Later on, in his time at the College of Dijon, Billy with the help of Pierre Fermat published his ideas on number theory. Billy's mathematical works also include Diophantus Redivivus. The foundational text for number theory was written in these volumes. Oldenburg and Rahn use this book as a reference to their own. Billy also wrote Diophantus Geometria Sive Opus Contextum ex Arithmetica et Geometrie Simul, which states a large number of solutions to algebraic equations, what we now call Diophantine equations.

In the field of astronomy, he published several astronomical tables. First published in Dijon by Pierre Palliot in 1656, Billy's tables of eclipses is called Tabulae Lodoicaeae seu universa eclipseon doctrina tabulis, praeceptis ac demonstrationibus explicata. Adiectus est calculus, aliquot eclipseon solis & lunae, quae proxime per totam Europam videbuntur. The tables were calculated for the years 1656 to 1693. This work also contains solar and lunar tables based on the Paris meridian. It also includes a detailed examination of problems involved in astronomical calculations. In 1665, Jacques de Billy wrote Discors de la comète qui a paru l'an 1665, au mois d'Auril. In this pamphlet, Billy talks about a comet observed in the sky in April of 1665. He talks about the path it took across the sky, its position to the stars and its appearance. He goes on to reject the common idea that comets were signs in the sky, and he states that they are actually a natural event that could be studied scientifically.

Billy put together a Doctrinae Analyticae inventum novum (based on his correspondence with Fermat), which was published as an addendum to the 1670 reedition of Diophantus's Arithmeticae, with Pierre de Fermat's notes. This work played a key role in making Fermat’s number-theoretic methods accessible to other mathematicians. In this book were several numerical problems that others were not able to solve.

Many other mathematicians such as Ozanam were influenced by many Jesuits, one of them being Jacques de Billy. Earlier in life, Billy wrote an analysis called Epilogue or Specious Analysis which was a book of mathematical problems that he didn’t revisit until later in his life after reading what Ozanam did in similar problems.

Billy was one of the first scientists to reject the role of astrology in science. He also rejected old notions about the malevolent influence of comets.

Jacques de Billy edited most Greek works in Latin, this was mainly due to his inability to find people who would publish his work.

In 1935, Jacques de Billy was honored with the naming of a lunar crater, which now bears the name Billy.

== Works ==
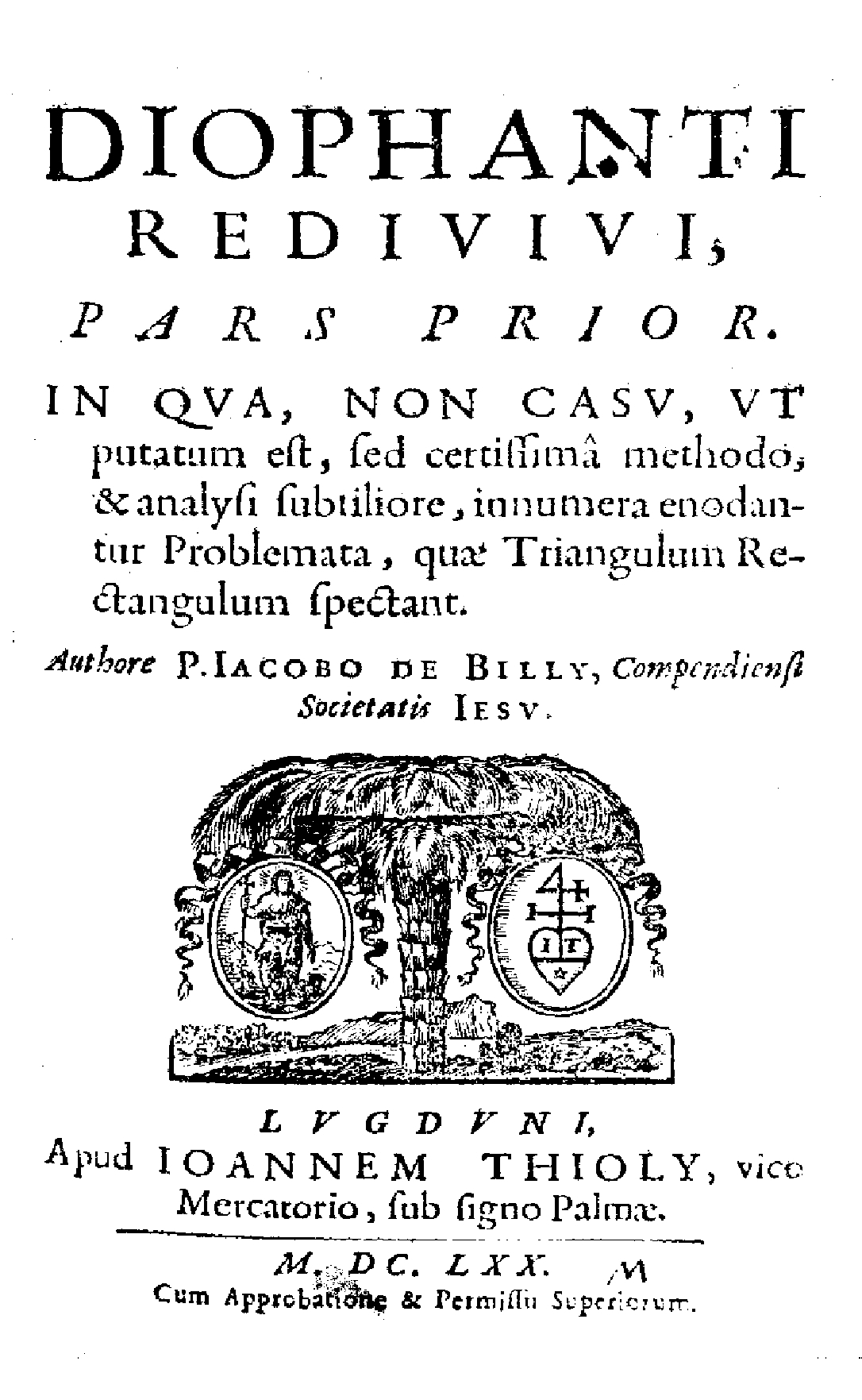
Diophanti redivivi, 1670

- Diophanti redivivi (in Latin). Vol. 1. Lyon: Jean Thioly. 1670.
- Diophanti redivivi (in Latin). Vol. 2. Lyon: Jean Thioly. 1670.

== See also ==
- List of Jesuit scientists
- List of Roman Catholic scientist-clerics
