= Spenserian sonnet =

Poetic form

The Spenserian sonnet is a sonnet form named for the poet Edmund Spenser.

A Spenserian sonnet consists of fourteen lines, which are broken into four stanzas: three interlocked quatrains and a final couplet, with the rhyme scheme $\mathrm{ABAB \,\, BCBC \,\, CDCD \,\, EE}$. It uses iambic pentameter.

One day I wrote her name upon the strand,
But came the waves and washed it away:
Again I wrote it with a second hand,
But came the tide, and made my pains his prey.
"Vain man," said she, "that dost in vain assay,
A mortal thing so to immortalize;
For I myself shall like to this decay,
And eke my name be wiped out likewise."
"Not so," (quod I) "let baser things devise
To die in dust, but you shall live by fame:
My verse your vertues rare shall eternize,
And in the heavens write your glorious name:
Where whenas death shall all the world subdue,
Our love shall live, and later life renew."

— Edmund Spenser, Amoretti, Sonnet 75

Three prominent features of this sonnet type were known already: Italian and French sonnets used five rhymes; sonnets of Thomas Wyatt and the Earl of Surrey used final couplets; and the interleaved ABAB rhymes were in the English style.

== History ==
The Spenserian sonnet was invented by Edmund Spenser, the famous sixteenth-century poet. Spenser was born in London, England, in 1552 or 1553. Currently, his epic allegorical poem, The Faerie Queene(1590), is his most well-known work. This intricate, captivating, and occasionally bizarre poem honors Elizabeth I in particular as well as the Tudor Dynasty in general. Twelve novels were intended, but Edward Spenser only published six of them while he was alive. The narrative centers on knights who stand in for several values. Spenser is seen as one of the greatest poets of all time, and this poem is regarded as one of the best written in the English language.

Spenserian sonnets were created during the same time period as the Shakespearean sonnet, and so there are similarities in the features of both forms. The Spenserian sonnet was also influenced by the Petrarchan sonnet (named after the Italian poet Petrarch), which is seen in their shared use of the volta.

The Spenserian sonnet gained popularity in Scotland during the 16th and 17th centuries, with Scottish royalty including King James VI using this form. The Spenserian sonnet was so popular in Scotland that it is sometimes referred to as the Scottish sonnet. A well-known example includes Alexander Montgomery who published 38 Spenserian sonnets in 1821.

Although Spenser is best-known for The Faerie Queene, he also wrote numerous sonnets such as one, Amoretti (1595), pioneering a new form that is now synonymous with his name
