= Pied Beauty =

Sonnet by Gerard Manley Hopkins, written 1877

"Pied Beauty" is a curtal sonnet by the English poet Gerard Manley Hopkins (1844–1889). It was written in 1877, but not published until 1918, when it was included as part of the collection Poems of Gerard Manley Hopkins.

Pied Beauty

Glory be to God for dappled things —
For skies of couple-colour as a brinded cow;
For rose-moles all in stipple upon trout that swim;
Fresh-firecoal chestnut-falls; finches' wings;
Landscape plotted and pieced — fold, fallow, and plough;
And áll trádes, their gear and tackle and trim.

All things counter, original, spare, strange;
Whatever is fickle, freckled (who knows how?)
With swift, slow; sweet, sour; adazzle, dim;
He fathers-forth whose beauty is past change:
Praise him.

— "Pied Beauty"
Gerard Manley Hopkins
written 1877.

== Background ==
In the poem, the narrator praises God for the variety of "dappled things" in nature, such as piebald cattle, trout and finches. He also describes how falling chestnuts resemble coals bursting in a fire, because of the way in which the chestnuts' reddish-brown meat is exposed when the shells break against the ground. The narrator then moves to an image of the landscape which has been "plotted and pieced" into fields (like quilt squares) by agriculture. At the end of the poem, the narrator emphasizes that God's beauty is "past change", and advises readers to "Praise him".

This ending is gently ironic and beautifully surprising: the entire poem has been about variety, and then God's attribute of immutability is praised in contrast. By juxtaposing God's changelessness with the vicissitudes of His creation, His separation from creation is emphasized, as is His vast creativity. This turn or volta also serves to highlight the poet's skill at uniting apparent opposites by means of form and content: the meter is Hopkins's own sprung rhythm, and the packing-in of various alliterative syllables serves as an aural example of the visual variety Hopkins describes.
