= Caudate sonnet =

Expanded version of the sonnet, consisting of 14 lines followed by a coda

A caudate sonnet is an expanded version of the sonnet. It consists of 14 lines in standard sonnet forms followed by a coda (Latin cauda meaning "tail", from which the name is derived).

The invention of the form is credited to Francesco Berni. However, Burchiello (1404–1449) used the same form with over 150 of his paradoxical (sometimes referred to as nonsensical) sonnets nearly 50 years before Berni was born. Burchiello's "popularity was not limited to Florence or the fifteenth century" and "in the sixteenth century Italian Renaissance" ... there were "several narratives about the poet-barber written by well-known figures such as Antonfrancesco Grazzini, Anton Francesco Doni, Angelo Colocci, and Tommaso Costo." Berni was not only familiar with Burchielo's work, but was an admirer of it. Berni wrote:

S'i' avessi l'ingegno del Burchiello,
Io vi farei volentieri un sonetto;
Ché non ebbi già mai tèma e subietto
Piú dolce, piú piacevol né piú bello.[61]

[If I had Burchiello's wit,
I would willingly write you a sonnet;
For never did I have a theme and subject
More sweet, more pleasant, more beautiful.]

According to the Princeton Encyclopedia of Poetry, the form was most frequently used for satire. John Milton's "On the New Forcers of Conscience Under the Long Parliament" is a prominent English instance, but Gerard Manley Hopkins used the form in a less satirical mood in his "That Nature is a Heraclitean Fire." Exploring the possibility of such a coda in a series of letters exchanged with Robert Bridges, Hopkins commented that though the intent of his example is distinct from Milton's satirical use, it adds stability to the poem's close.
