= Quatorzain =

Poem of fourteen lines

A quatorzain (from Italian quattordici or French quatorze, fourteen) is a poem of fourteen lines. Historically the term has been used interchangeably with the term "sonnet". Various writers have tried to draw distinctions between "true" sonnets and quatorzains. Nowadays the term is rarely used. When it is used, it is to distinguish fourteen-line poems that do not follow the various rules which describe the sonnet.

Some notable quatorzains were written by William Shakespeare (Sonnet 18, sonnet 73, sonnet 116) and Elizabeth Barrett Browning (a collection of 44 sonnets that she dedicated to her husband). Another noteworthy quatorzain poet to mention is John Milton.

== See also ==
- Bref double
- Fourteener
