= Tommaso Costo =

Italian Renaissance humanist and writer

Tommaso Costo (c. 1545 – c. 1613) was an Italian Renaissance humanist and writer.

== Biography ==
Tommaso Costo was born in Naples around 1545. After completing his studies, he served as secretary for various noble families, including the Carafa and the Pignatelli. In 1586 Costo became secretary of the Neapolitan Accademia degli Svegliati. In 1591, he was admitted to the Accademia della Crusca. In 1599 he was appointed Secretary of the Grand Court of the Admiralty by the Prince of Conca, Matteo di Capua, Great Admiral of Naples. He drew on the experience he gained in these years for his Trattato dell'officio del segretario (1604). He died shortly after 1613.

== Works ==
Costo devoted himself to writing poems, short stories and historical works. He was acquainted with some important Neapolitan men of letters of the day, including the poet and scholar Giovanni Battista Attendolo, the poet and historian Angelo di Costanzo and the scholar Julius Capaccio. In his first work, the epic La rotta di Lepanto (1573), he celebrates the victory of the Holy League over the Ottoman Navy in the battle of Lepanto. His best known work is Il fuggilozio (1601), a collection of short stories modeled on Boccaccio's Decameron, dedicated to Matteo di Capua, and reissued several times. He also edited a valuable edition of Torquato Tasso's Jerusalem Delivered, published in Naples in 1582.

== List of works ==
- Della rotta di Lepanto canti cinque. Naples: appresso Gio. Battista Cappelli. 1573.
- Il pianto di Ruggiero. Naples: appresso Gio. Battista Cappelli. 1582.
- La vittoria della Lega. Naples: appresso Gio. Battista Cappelli. 1582.
- Giunta di tre libri di Tomaso Costo cittadino napoletano al Compendio dell'Istoria del Regno di Napoli. Venice: presso Barezzo Barezzi. 1588.
- Istoria dell'origine del sagratissimo luogo di Montevergine. Venice: appresso Barezzo Barezzi. 1591.
- Le vite di tutti i pontefici da S. Piero in qua. Venice: Bernardo Basa. 1592.
- Ragionamenti di Tomaso Costo intorno alla Descrizzione del Regno di Napoli, et all'antichità di Pozzuolo di Scipione Mazzella. Naples: nella stamparia dello Stigliola à Porta Regale. 1595.
- Il fuggilozio di Tomaso Costo diviso in otto giornate. Venice: apresso Mattia Colosini, e Barrezzo Barezzi. 1601.
- Lettere del signor Tomaso Costo scritte à diuersi, così da parte d'altri, come sua, in varij soggetti. Venice: appresso Barezzo Barezzi, & compagni. 1602.
- La apologia istorica del Regno di Napoli. Naples: nella stamparia di Gio. Domenico Roncagliolo. 1613.
- Memoriale delle cose più notabili accadute nel Regno di Napoli dall'incarnazione di Cristo per tutto l'anno 1617. Naples: per Scipione Bonino. 1618.

== Bibliography ==
- Lettere, Vera (1984). "COSTO, Tommaso". Dizionario Biografico degli Italiani (in Italian). Vol. 30: Cosattini–Crispolto. Rome: Istituto dell'Enciclopedia Italiana. ISBN 978-88-12-00032-6.
- Capucci, Martino (2002). "Costo, Tommaso". The Oxford Companion to Italian Literature. Oxford University Press.
