= Jacques de Billy (abbot) =

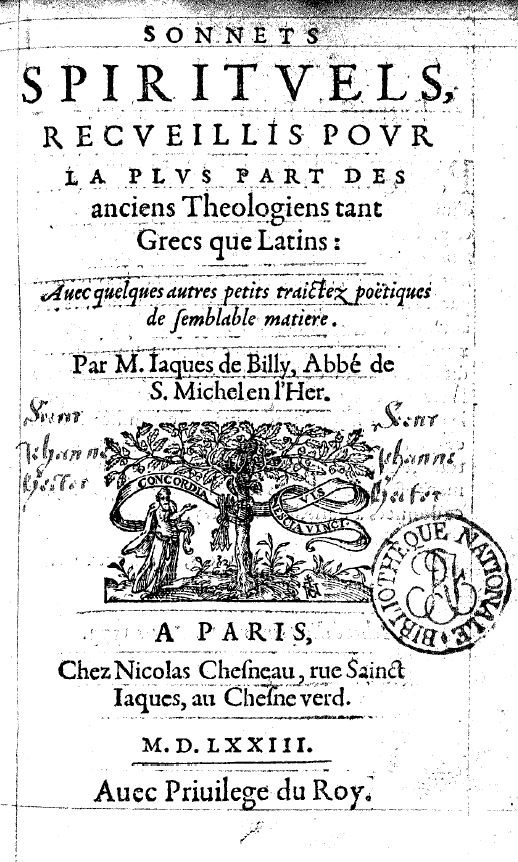
Jacques de Billy de Prunay, Sonnets spirituels (1567).

Jacques de Billy (Billi) de Prunay was a French patristic scholar, theologian, jurist, linguist, and Benedictine abbot (1535—December 25, 1581).

Born in Guise in Picardy, he began his studies at Paris, completed a course of philosophy and theology before he was eighteen years of age, and then, at the request of his parents went to Orléans and later to Poitiers to study jurisprudence. But having no inclination for law, he devoted most of his time to literature. The early death of his parents gave him the opportunity he desired of pursuing unhampered his favorite study of letters.

Quietly withdrawing to Lyon and later to Avignon, de Billy devoted himself, for a period, entirely to the study of Greek and Hebrew. He already held in commendam the Abbey of St.-Léonard of Ferrières in Anjou, and the Priory of Taussigny in Touraine, when his older brother Jean, who had hitherto led a very worldly life, suddenly announced his intention of becoming a Carthusian, and resigned in favour of Jacques his two abbeys, Notre-Dame des Châtelliers and Saint-Michel-en-l'Herm.

After some hesitation de Billy accepted them, then entered the Order of St. Benedict, and later was made a regular abbot. Thenceforth he led a very ascetic life and governed his monasteries with great prudence. He was especially solicitous for the proper observance of monastic discipline and with that object in view renewed, in 1566, the statutes of his predecessor, Abbot Bertrand de Moussy. During the civil wars that devastated France at this period the monastery of St.-Michel-en-l'Herme was wholly destroyed. The abbot himself was frequently obliged to seek refuge from the ravages of war, and resided, for short periods, at Laon, Nantes, Paris, and in the Priory of Taussigny.

His Anthologia sacra libri quator, quorum primus & secundus a Jacobo Billio...Tertius Prosperi Aquitanici sacra Epigrammata in D. Aurelii Augustini sententias continet.. Quartus varios Hymnos sacras, pietatem spirantes complectitur was first published in Paris in 1575.

He died at Paris.

== Works ==
- S. Gregorii Nazianzeni magazine omnia latine (Paris, 1569); a second and better edition appeared in 1583.
- Sonnets spirituels : recueillis pour la plus part des anciens théologiens, tant grecs que latins, avec quelques autres petits traictez poëtiques de semblable matière (1567)
- Consolations et instructions (Paris, 1570)
- Récréations spirituelles (Paris, 1573)
- S. Gregorii Nazianzeni opuscula (Paris, 1575)
- Interpretatio Latina xviii priorum capitum S. Irenaei (Paris, 1575).
- Antholigia sacra (Paris, 1576)
- Joannis Damasceni opera (Paris, 1577)
- Locutiones Graecae (Paris, 1578).
- Opuscula aliqua S. Joannis Chrysostomi (Paris, 1581)
- S. Isidori Pelusiotae epis. Libri tres (Paris, 1585)
- S. Epiphanii opera (Paris, 1612).

== Sources ==
- Polybiblio
- Jacques de Billy at the Catholic Encyclopedia
