= Petrarchan sonnet =

Poem with a pattern of rhyming schemes

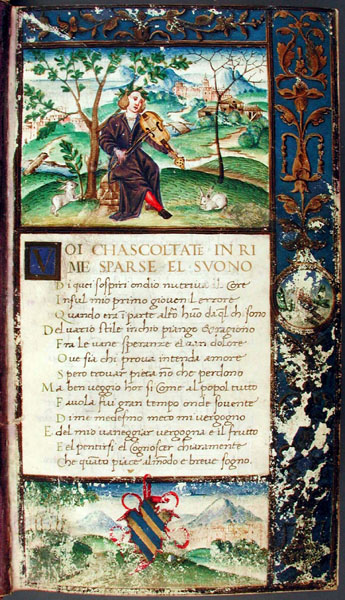
A Petrarchan Sonnet

The Petrarchan sonnet, also known as the Italian sonnet, is a type of sonnet named after the Italian poet Francesco Petrarca, although it was not developed by Petrarch himself, but rather by a string of Renaissance poets. Because of the structure of Italian, the rhyme scheme of the Petrarchan sonnet is more easily fulfilled in that language than in English. The original Italian sonnet form consists of a total of fourteen hendecasyllabic lines in two parts, the first part being an octave and the second being a sestet.

== Form ==
The rhyme scheme for the octave is typically $\mathrm{ABBAABBA}$. The sestet is more flexible. Petrarch typically used $\mathrm{CDECDE}$ or$\mathrm{CDCDCD}$ for the sestet. Some other possibilities for the sestet include $\mathrm{CDDCDD}$, $\mathrm{CDDECE}$, or $\mathrm{CDDCCD}$ (as in Wordsworth's "Nuns Fret Not at Their Convent's Narrow Room," a sonnet about sonnets). This form was used in the earliest English sonnets by Wyatt and others. For background on the pre-English sonnet, see Robert Canary's web page, The Continental Origins of the Sonnet. In a strict Petrarchan sonnet, the sestet does not end with a couplet, since this would tend to divide the sestet into a quatrain and a couplet. However, in Italian sonnets in English, this rule is not always observed, and $\mathrm{CDDCEE}$ and $\mathrm{CDCDEE}$ are also used.

The octave introduces a problem or conflict in the mind of the speaker, in the first four lines (known as the first quatrain). The next quatrain explains the problem or provides an exposition to the reader. The sestet begins with a volta which marks the change in rhyme scheme as well as the change of the conflict into a solution or some form of resolution.

Sir Thomas Wyatt and Henry Howard, Earl of Surrey are both known for their translations of Petrarch's sonnets from Italian into English. While Surrey tended to use the English sonnet form in his own work, reserving the Petrarchan form for his translations of Petrarch, Wyatt made extensive use of the Italian sonnet form in the poems of his that were not translation and adaptation work. As a result, he is often credited for integrating the Petrarchan sonnet into English vernacular tradition.

The form also gave rise to an "anti-Petrarchan" convention. The convention was also mocked, or adopted for alternative persuasive means by many of the Inns of Court writers during the Renaissance.

== Structure ==
The sonnet is split in two stanzas: the "octave" or "octet" (of 8 lines) and the "sestet" (of 6 lines), for a total of 14 lines.

The octave typically introduces the theme or problem using a rhyme scheme of $\mathrm{ABBAABBA}$. The sestet provides resolution for the poem and rhymes variously, but usually follows the schemes of $\mathrm{CDECDE}$ or $\mathrm{CDCCDC}$.

=== Examples of a Petrarchan sonnet ===
William Wordsworth's "London, 1802"

Octave

Milton! thou shouldst be living at this hour:	$\mathrm{A}$
England hath need of thee: she is a fen	$\mathrm{B}$
Of stagnant waters: altar, sword, and pen,	$\mathrm{B}$
Fireside, the heroic wealth of hall and bower,	$\mathrm{A}$
Have forfeited their ancient English dower	$\mathrm{A}$
Of inward happiness. We are selfish men;	$\mathrm{B}$
Oh! raise us up, return to us again;	$\mathrm{B}$
And give us manners, virtue, freedom, power.	$\mathrm{A}$

Sestet

Thy soul was like a Star, and dwelt apart;	$\mathrm{C}$
Thou hadst a voice whose sound was like the sea:	$\mathrm{D}$
Pure as the naked heavens, majestic, free,	$\mathrm{D}$
So didst thou travel on life's common way,	$\mathrm{E}$
In cheerful godliness; and yet thy heart	$\mathrm{C}$
The lowliest duties on herself did lay.	$\mathrm{E}$

Emma Lazarus's "The New Colossus"

Lazarus's poem uses one of the oldest and most traditional patterns for the sestet.

Octave

Not like the brazen giant of Greek fame,	$\mathrm{A}$
With conquering limbs astride from land to land;	$\mathrm{B}$
Here at our sea-washed, sunset gates shall stand	$\mathrm{B}$
A mighty woman with a torch, whose flame	$\mathrm{A}$
Is the imprisoned lightning, and her name	$\mathrm{A}$
Mother of Exiles. From her beacon-hand	$\mathrm{B}$
Glows world-wide welcome; her mild eyes command	$\mathrm{B}$
The air-bridged harbor that twin cities frame.	$\mathrm{A}$

Sestet

"Keep, ancient lands, your storied pomp!" cries she	$\mathrm{C}$
With silent lips. "Give me your tired, your poor,	$\mathrm{D}$
Your huddled masses yearning to breathe free,	$\mathrm{C}$
The wretched refuse of your teeming shore.	$\mathrm{D}$
Send these, the homeless, tempest-tost to me,	$\mathrm{C}$
I lift my lamp beside the golden door!"	$\mathrm{D}$

Sri Aurobindo's "MAN THE ENIGMA"

Octave

A deep enigma is the soul of man.	$\mathrm{A}$
His conscious life obeys the Inconscient’s rule,	$\mathrm{B}$
His need of joy is learned in sorrow’s school,	$\mathrm{B}$
His heart is a chaos and an empyrean.	$\mathrm{A}$
His subtle Ignorance borrows Wisdom’s plan;	$\mathrm{A}$
His mind is the Infinite’s sharp and narrow tool.	$\mathrm{B}$
He wades through mud to reach the Wonderful,	$\mathrm{B}$
And does what Matter must or Spirit can.	$\mathrm{A}$

Sestet

All powers in his living’s soil take root	$\mathrm{C}$
And claim from him their place and struggling right:	$\mathrm{D}$
His ignorant creature mind crawling towards light	$\mathrm{D}$
Is Nature’s fool and Godhead’s candidate,	$\mathrm{E}$
A demigod and a demon and a brute,	$\mathrm{C}$
The slave and the creator of his fate.	$\mathrm{E}$

1939.
