= Octave (poetry) =

Eight lines of poetry forming a stanza

Octave has been derived from the Latin word octāva, which means “eighth part.” It is a verse form that contains eight lines, which usually appear in an iambic pentameter. In simple words, it can be any stanza in a poem that has eight lines and follows a rhymed or unrhymed meter.

An octave is a verse form consisting of eight lines of iambic pentameter (in English) or of hendecasyllables (in Italian). The most common rhyme scheme for an octave is $\mathrm{ABBA \,\, ABBA}$.

An octave is the first part of a Petrarchan sonnet, which ends with a contrasting sestet. In traditional Italian sonnets the octave always ends with a conclusion of one idea, giving way to another idea in the sestet. Some English sonnets break that rule, often to striking effect. In Milton's Sonnet 19, the sestet begins early, halfway through the last line of the octave:

When I consider how my light is spent
Ere half my days in this dark world and wide,
And that one talent which is death to hide
Lodg'd with me useless, though my soul more bent

To serve therewith my Maker and present
My true account, lest he returning chide,
"Doth God exact day-labor, light denied?"
I fondly ask. But patience, to prevent

That murmur, soon replies: "God doth not need
Either man's work or his own gifts: who best
Bear his mild yoke, they serve him best. His state
Is kingly; thousands at his bidding speed

And post o'er land and ocean without rest:
They also serve who only stand and wait."

== See also ==
- Sicilian octave
- Ottava rima
