= Sestet =

Six lines of poetry forming a stanza

A sestet is six lines of poetry forming a stanza or complete poem. A sestet is also the name given to the second division of an Italian sonnet (as opposed to an English or Spenserian Sonnet), which must consist of an octave, of eight lines, succeeded by a sestet, of six lines.

The etymology of the word can be traced to the Italian word sestetto, meaning “sixth”. The origin of the sonnet form has been traced to poems by Giacomo da Lentini in Sicily. The original sonnet form is the Sicilian Sonnet (also in octave and sestet) rhyming $\mathrm{ABABABAB \,\, CDECDE}$ or $\mathrm{CDCDCD}$. It is generally believed that the first eight lines derive from the Sicilian form of the Stramboto.

The first recognized and documented user of this poetical form was the Italian poet Petrarch. In the usual course the rhymes are arranged $\mathrm{ABCABC}$, but this is not necessary.

Early Italian sonnets, and in particular those of Dante, often close with the rhyme arrangement $\mathrm{ABCCBA}$, but in languages where the sonority of syllables is not so great as it is in Italian, it is incorrect to leave a period of five lines between one rhyme and another. In the quatorzain, there is, properly speaking, no sestet, but a quatrain followed by a couplet, as in the case of English sonnets. Another form of sestet has only two rhymes, $\mathrm{ABABAB}$, as is the case in Gray's famous sonnet On the Death of Richard West.

The sestet marks the turn of emotion in the sonnet. As a rule, with the octave having been more or less objective, reflection should make its appearance in the sestet, with a tendency to the subjective manner. For example, in Matthew Arnold's The Better Part, the rough inquirer, who has had his own way in the octave, is replied to as soon as the sestet commences:

So answerest thou; but why not rather say:
"Hath man no second life? – Pitch this one high!
Sits there no judge in Heaven, our sin to see? –
More strictly, then, the inward judge obey!
Was Christ a man like us? Ah! let us try
If we then, too, can be such men as he!"

Wordsworth and Milton are both remarkable for the dignity with which they conduct the downward wave of the sestet in their sonnet. The French sonneteers of the 16th century, with Ronsard at their head, preferred the softer sound of the arrangement $\mathrm{AABCCB}$. The German poets have usually wavered between the English and the Italian forms.
