= The Sparrow's Nest =

Lyric poem by William Wordsworth

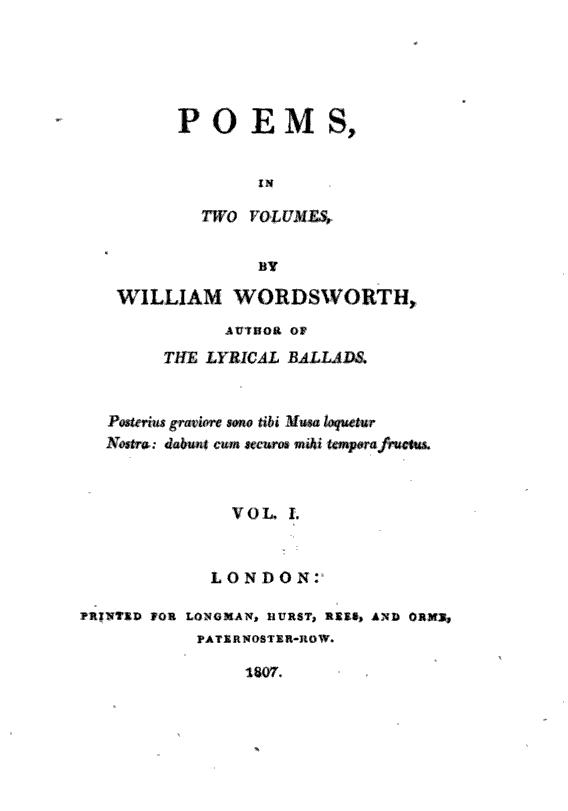
Title page of Poems in Two Volumes

"The Sparrows Nest"

Behold, within the leavy shade,
Those bright blue eggs together laid !
On me the chance-discovered sight
Gleamed like a vision of delight.
I started—seeming to espy
The home and sheltered bed,
The Sparrow’s dwelling, which, hard by
My Father’s house, in wet or dry
My sister Emmeline and I
Together visited.

She looked at it and seemed to fear it;
Dreading, tho' wishing, to be near it :
Such heart was in her, being then
A little Prattler among men.
The Blessing of my later years
Was with me when a boy :
She gave me eyes, she gave me ears;
And humble cares, and delicate fears;
A heart, the fountain of sweet tears;
And love, and thought, and joy.

— William Wordsworth Poems in Two Volumes

"The Sparrows Nest" is a lyric poem written by William Wordsworth at Town End, Grasmere, in 1801. It was first published in the collection Poems in Two Volumes in 1807.

The poem is a moving tribute to Wordsworth's sister Dorothy, recalling their early childhood together in Cockermouth before they were separated following their mother's death in 1778 when he was barely eight years old.

== History ==
"At the end of the garden of my father's house at Cockermouth was a high terrace that commanded a fine view of the river Derwent and Cockermouth Castle. This was our favourite play-ground. The terrace-wall, a low one, was covered with closely-clipt privet and roses, which gave an almost impervious shelter to birds that built their nests there. The latter of these stanzas alludes to one of those nests."

— William Wordsworth, The Complete Poetical Works of William Wordsworth, Volume 1

The 'Emmeline' of the poem is his sister Dorothy.

The poem itself was placed in a section of Poems in Two Volumes entitled Moods of my Mind, in which he grouped together his most deeply felt lyrics. Others included "To a Butterfly", a childhood recollection of chasing butterflies with Dorothy, and "I Wandered Lonely as a Cloud", closely based on an entry in Dorothy's journal following a walk together and an example of the line "She gave me eyes, she gave me ears" in the poem.

== Bibliography ==
- Davies, Hunter. William Wordsworth, Weidenfeld and Nicolson 1980
- Gill, Stephen. William Wordsworth: A Life, Oxford University Press 1989
- Gill, Stephen. "William Wordsworth: The Major Works including The Prelude, Oxford University Press 1984
- Moorman, Mary. William Wordsworth, A Biography: The Early Years, 1770–1803 v. 1, Oxford University Press 1957
- Moorman, Mary. William Wordsworth: A Biography: The Later Years, 1803–50 v. 2, Oxford University Press 1965
- Wordsworth, Dorothy (ed. Pamela Woof). The Grasmere and Alfoxden Journals., Oxford University Press 2002
