= To a Butterfly =

Lyric poem by William Wordsworth

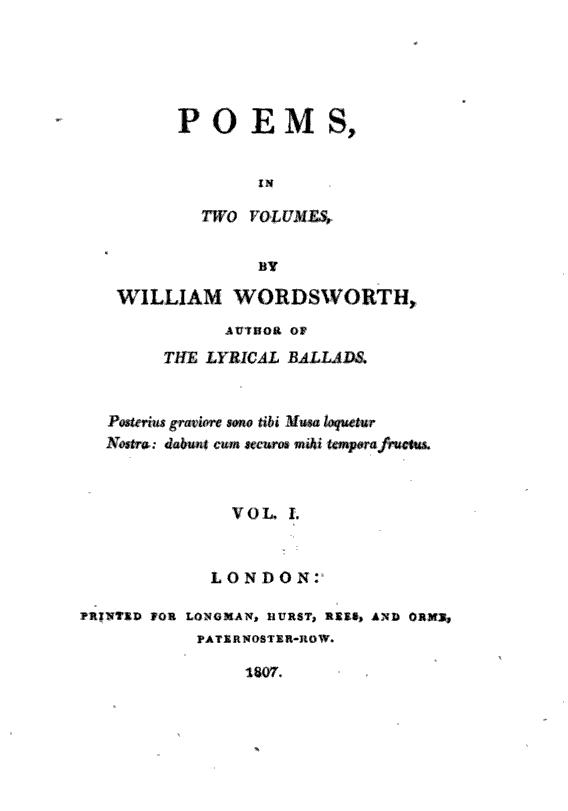
Title page of Poems, in Two Volumes

"To a Butterfly"

Stay near me—do not take thy flight!
A little longer stay in sight!
Much converse do I find in Thee,
Historian of my Infancy!
Float near me; do not yet depart!
Dead times revive in thee:
Thou bring'st, gay Creature as thou art!
A solemn image to my heart,
My Father's Family!

Oh! pleasant, pleasant were the days,
The time, when in our childish plays
My sister Emmeline and I
Together chased the Butterfly!
A very hunter did I rush
Upon the prey:—with leaps and springs
I follow'd on from brake to bush;
But She, God love her! feared to brush
The dust from off its wings.

— William Wordsworth Poems, in Two Volumes

"To a Butterfly" is a lyric poem written by William Wordsworth at Town End, Grasmere, in 1802. It was first published in the collection Poems, in Two Volumes in 1807.

Wordsworth wrote two poems addressing a butterfly, of which this is the first and best known. In the poem, he recalls how he and his sister Dorothy would chase butterflies as children when they were living together in Cockermouth, before they were separated following their mother's death in 1778 when he was barely eight years old.

== History ==
"William had slept badly – he got up at 9 o clock, but before he rose he had finished with the Beggar Boys – & while we were at Breakfast that is (for I had Breakfasted) he, with his Basin of Broth before him untouched & a little plate of Bread and butter he wrote the Poem to a Butterfly! – He ate not a morsel, nor put on his stockings but sate with shirt neck unbuttoned, & his waistcoat open while he did it. The thought first came upon him as we were talking about the pleasure we both always feel at the sight of a Butterfly."

— Dorothy Wordsworth, The Grasmere Journal, Sunday 14 March 1802

The "Emmeline" of the poem is Wordsworth's sister Dorothy.

The day before Wordsworth had been walking with Dorothy, and on their way back he had begun a poem that eventually became "Beggars". That evening Dorothy read to him her account in her journal of the incident that had inspired the poem, but on this occasion that proved to be unfortunate because he could not rid himself of her words and was unable to finish it. However, as Dorothy's journal entry shows, the next morning he was able to complete it as well as start and finish "To a Butterfly", remembering their childhood days together.

The poem was placed in a section of Poems, in Two Volumes entitled "Moods of my Mind", in which he grouped together his most deeply felt lyrics. Others included "The Sparrow's Nest", in which he says of Dorothy "[S]he gave me eyes, she gave me ears", and "I Wandered Lonely as a Cloud", based closely on an entry in Dorothy's journal following another walk together.

== Bibliography ==
- Davies, Hunter. William Wordsworth, Weidenfeld and Nicolson 1980
- Gill, Stephen. William Wordsworth: A Life, Oxford University Press 1989
- Gill, Stephen. "William Wordsworth: The Major Works including The Prelude", Oxford University Press 1984
- Moorman, Mary. William Wordsworth, A Biography: The Early Years, 1770–1803 v. 1, Oxford University Press 1957
- Moorman, Mary. William Wordsworth: A Biography: The Later Years, 1803–50 v. 2, Oxford University Press 1965
- Wordsworth, Dorothy (ed. Pamela Woof). The Grasmere and Alfoxden Journals., Oxford University Press 2002
