= I Wandered Lonely as a Cloud =

Lyric poem by William Wordsworth

- by William Wordsworth
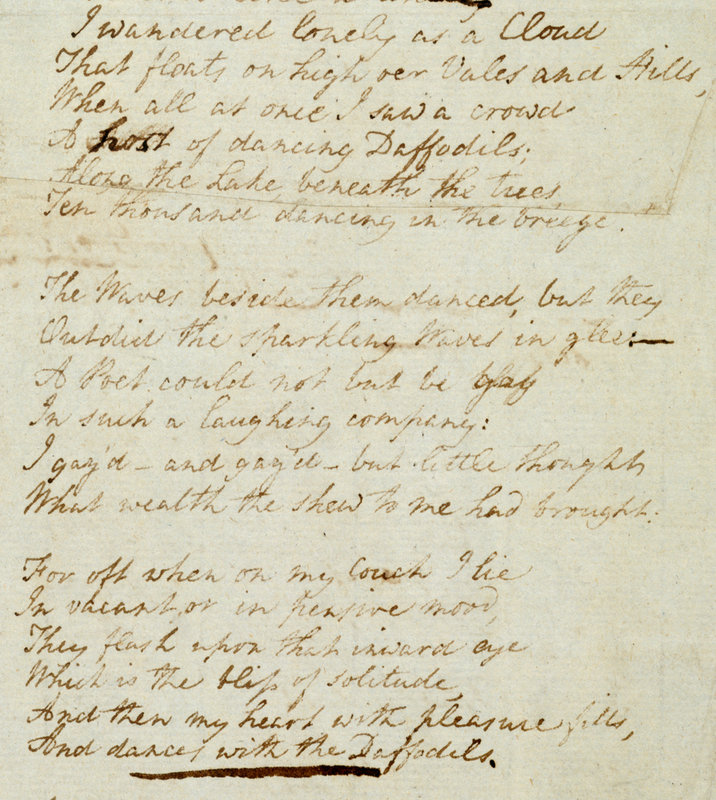
- A hand-written manuscript of the poem (1804). British Library Add. MS 47864

"I Wandered Lonely as a Cloud" (also sometimes called "Daffodils") is a lyric poem by William Wordsworth. It is one of his most popular, and was inspired by an encounter on 15 April 1802 during a walk with his younger sister Dorothy, when they saw a "long belt" of daffodils on the shore of Ullswater in the English Lake District. Written in 1804, this 24-line lyric was first published in 1807 in Poems, in Two Volumes, and revised in 1815.

In a poll conducted in 1995 by the BBC Radio 4 Bookworm programme to determine the UK's favourite poems, I Wandered Lonely as a Cloud came fifth. Often anthologised, it is now seen as a classic of English Romantic poetry, although Poems, in Two Volumes was poorly reviewed by Wordsworth's contemporaries.

== Background ==
The inspiration for the poem came from a walk Wordsworth took with his younger sister Dorothy in 1804 around Glencoyne Bay, Ullswater, in the Lake District of England.

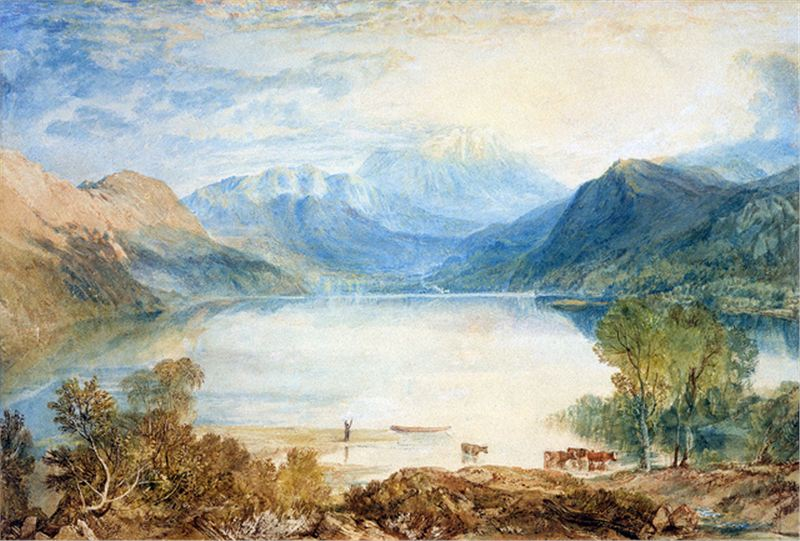
Ullswater in the English Lake District. Ullswater from Gobarrow Park by J. M. W. Turner, watercolour, 1819. Gobarrow Park is on the north side of Ullswater, so Wordsworth's daffodils would have been on the nearer shore – near the cows perhaps?

When we were in the woods beyond Gowbarrow park we saw a few daffodils close to the water side, we fancied that the lake had floated the seed ashore and that the little colony had so sprung up – But as we went along there were more and yet more and at last under the boughs of the trees, we saw that there was a long belt of them along the shore, about the breadth of a country turnpike road. I never saw daffodils so beautiful they grew among the mossy stones about and about them, some rested their heads upon these stones as on a pillow for weariness and the rest tossed and reeled and danced and seemed as if they verily laughed with the wind that blew upon them over the Lake, they looked so gay ever glancing ever changing. This wind blew directly over the lake to them. There was here and there a little knot and a few stragglers a few yards higher up but they were so few as not to disturb the simplicity and unity and life of that one busy highway – We rested again and again. The Bays were stormy and we heard the waves at different distances and in the middle of the water like the Sea.

— Dorothy Wordsworth, The Grasmere Journal Thursday, 15 April 1802

At the time he wrote the poem, Wordsworth was living with his wife, Mary Hutchinson, and sister Dorothy at Town End, (Note: Their cottage is known as Dove Cottage today, but in fact it had no name in their time and their address was simply "Town End, Grasmere", Town End being the name of the hamlet in Grasmere they lived in. See Moorman (1957). pp. 459–460.) in Grasmere in the Lake District. Mary contributed what Wordsworth later said were the two best lines in the poem, recalling the "tranquil restoration" of Tintern Abbey, (Note: In the Preface to the Lyrical Ballads Wordsworth famously defined poetry as "the spontaneous overflow of powerful feelings: it takes its origin from emotion recollected in tranquillity." Mary Moorman (1957 pp. 148–149) remarks that in this manner spring poems such as "Tintern Abbey" and "I wandered lonely as a Cloud", as well as all the best of The Prelude.)

They flash upon that inward eye
Which is the bliss of solitude

The entire household thus contributed to the poem. Nevertheless, Wordsworth's biographer Mary Moorman notes that Dorothy was excluded from the poem, even though she had seen the daffodils together with Wordsworth.

Wordsworth was aware of the appropriateness of the idea of daffodils which "flash upon that inward eye" because in his 1815 version he added a note commenting on the "flash" as an "ocular spectrum". Coleridge in Biographia Literaria of 1817, while acknowledging the concept of "visual spectrum" as being "well known", described Wordsworth's (and Mary's) lines, among others, as "mental bombast". Fred Blick has shown that the idea of flashing flowers was derived from the "Elizabeth Linnaeus phenomenon", so called because of the discovery of flashing flowers by Elizabeth Linnaeus in 1762. Wordsworth described it as "rather an elementary feeling and simple impression (approaching to the nature of an ocular spectrum) upon the imaginative faculty, rather than an exertion of it..." The phenomenon was reported upon in 1789 and 1794 by Erasmus Darwin, whose work Wordsworth certainly read.

The earlier Lyrical Ballads, a collection of poems by Wordsworth and Samuel Taylor Coleridge, had been first published in 1798 and started the romantic movement in England. It had brought Wordsworth and the other Lake Poets into the limelight. Wordsworth had published nothing new since the 1800 edition of Lyrical Ballads, and a new publication was eagerly awaited. Wordsworth had gained some financial security by the 1805 publication of the fourth edition of Lyrical Ballads; it was the first from which he enjoyed the profits of copyright ownership. He decided to turn away from the long poem he was working on (The Recluse) and devote more attention to publishing Poems in Two Volumes, in which "I Wandered Lonely as a Cloud" first appeared. The poem itself was placed in a section of Poems in Two Volumes entitled "Moods of my Mind" in which he grouped together his most deeply felt lyrics. Others included "To a Butterfly", a childhood recollection of chasing butterflies with Dorothy, and "The Sparrow's Nest", in which he says of Dorothy "She gave me eyes, she gave me ears".

== Original version ==
The version published in the 1807 Poems in Two Volumes ran:

I wandered lonely as a Cloud
That floats on high o'er Vales and Hills,
When all at once I saw a crowd
A host of dancing Daffodils;
Along the Lake, beneath the trees,
Ten thousand dancing in the breeze.

The waves beside them danced, but they
Outdid the sparkling waves in glee: --
A poet could not but be gay
In such a laughing company:
I gazed—and gazed—but little thought
What wealth the show to me had brought:

For oft when on my couch I lie
In vacant or in pensive mood,
They flash upon that inward eye
Which is the bliss of solitude,
And then my heart with pleasure fills,
And dances with the Daffodils.

== Revision ==
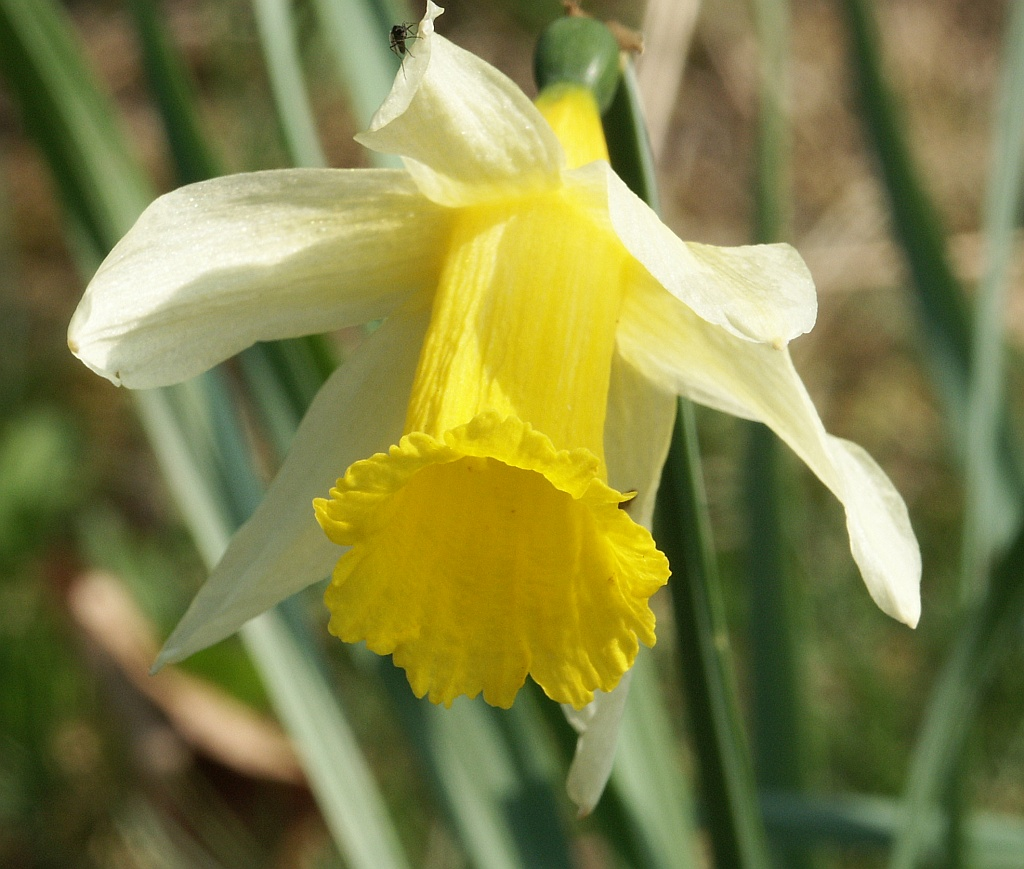
Narcissus pseudonarcissus, the "daffodil" native to the Lake District

Wordsworth revised the poem in 1815. He replaced "dancing" with "golden"; "along" with "beside"; and "ten thousand" with "fluttering and". He then added a stanza between the first and second, and changed "laughing" to "jocund". The last stanza was left untouched.

I wandered lonely as a cloud
That floats on high o'er vales and hills,
When all at once I saw a crowd,
A host of golden daffodils;
Beside the lake, beneath the trees,
Fluttering and dancing in the breeze.

Continuous as the stars that shine
and twinkle on the Milky Way,
They stretched in never-ending line
along the margin of a bay:
Ten thousand saw I at a glance,
tossing their heads in sprightly dance.

The waves beside them danced; but they
Out-did the sparkling waves in glee:
A poet could not but be gay,
in such a jocund company:
I gazed—and gazed—but little thought
what wealth the show to me had brought:

For oft, when on my couch I lie
In vacant or in pensive mood,
They flash upon that inward eye
Which is the bliss of solitude;
And then my heart with pleasure fills,
And dances with the daffodils.

== Composition and themes ==
The poem is 24 lines long, consisting of four six-line stanzas. Each stanza is formed by a quatrain, then a couplet, to form a sestet and a ABABCC rhyme scheme. Like most works by Wordsworth, it is Romantic in nature; the beauty of nature, unkempt by humanity, and a reconciliation of man with his environment, are two of the fundamental principles of the Romantic movement within poetry.

The plot of the poem is simple. Wordsworth believed it "an elementary feeling and simple impression". The speaker is wandering as if among the clouds, viewing a belt of daffodils that remain on his mind, influencing his emotions even far into the future.

The reversal of usual syntax in phrases, particularly "Ten thousand saw I at a glance" is used as part of foregrounding (for emphasis). Loneliness, it seems, is only a human emotion, unlike the mere solitariness of the cloud. In the second and third verses, the memory of the daffodils is given permanence, particularly through comparison the stars; this is in contrast to the transitory nature of life examined in other works.

In the last stanza, it is revealed that this scene is only a memory of the pensive speaker. This is marked by a change from a narrative past tense to the present tense as a conclusion to a sense of movement within the poem. Wordsworth employs lexical field through verbs emphasizing a sense of action and movement to achieve this; "stretched", "flash upon", "dances". The scene of the last verse mirrors the readers' position as they finish the poem ("on my couch I lie / In vacant or in pensive mood") to establish a thread between speaker and reader. Wordsworth thereby evokes the very same images flashing upon the speaker's mind for the reader, allowing the hearts of his audience too to "dance with the daffodils". In this way, the Romantic ideal of reverence towards nature is achieved throughout the poem.

Like the maiden's song in "The Solitary Reaper", the memory of the daffodils is described to be permanently etched into the speaker's mind. When in "vacant or in pensive mood", these images return to him. Juxtaposing images of the initial passivity and stillness of the speaker with the moving dynamic images of these flowers allows Wordsworth to depict the ultimate power of nature and how it moves those who witness it. The full impact of the daffodils' beauty, a synecdoche of nature's beauty, did not strike him at the moment of witnessing it, but eventually moves him from his passive state too.

== Reception ==
=== Contemporary ===
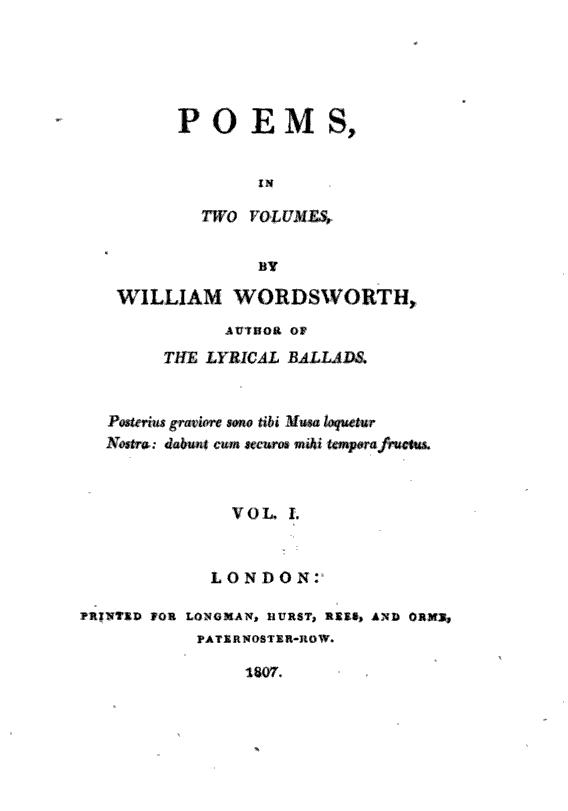
The title page of Poems, in Two Volumes

Poems, in Two Volumes was poorly reviewed by contemporaries, including Lord Byron, whom Wordsworth came to despise. Byron said of the volume, in one of its first reviews, "Mr. [Wordsworth] ceases to please, ... clothing [his ideas] in language not simple, but puerile". Wordsworth wrote ahead to soften the thoughts of The Critical Review, hoping his friend Francis Wrangham would push for a gentler approach. He succeeded in preventing an enemy from writing the review, but it did not help; as Wordsworth said, it was a case of, "Out of the frying pan, into the fire". Of any positives within Poems, in Two Volumes, the perceived masculinity in "The Happy Warrior", written on the death of Nelson and unlikely to be the subject of attack, was one such. Poems like "I Wandered Lonely as a Cloud" could not have been further from it. Wordsworth took the reviews stoically.

Even Wordsworth's close friend Coleridge said (referring especially to the "child-philosopher" stanzas VII and VIII of "Intimations of Immortality") that the poems contained "mental bombast". Two years later, many were more positive about the collection. Samuel Rogers said that he had "dwelt particularly on the beautiful idea of the 'Dancing Daffodils'", and this was echoed by Henry Crabb Robinson. Critics were rebutted by public opinion, and the work gained in popularity and recognition, as did Wordsworth.

Poems, in Two Volumes was savagely reviewed by Francis Jeffrey in the Edinburgh Review (without singling out "I wandered lonely as a Cloud"), but the Review was well known for its dislike of the Lake Poets. As Sir Walter Scott put it at the time of publication, "Wordsworth is harshly treated in the Edinburgh Review, but Jeffrey gives ... as much praise as he usually does", and indeed Jeffrey praised the sonnets.

Upon the author's death in 1850, The Westminster Review called "I wandered lonely as a Cloud" "very exquisite".

=== Modern ===
Pamela Woof wrote that "The permanence of stars as compared with flowers emphasises the permanence of memory for the poet." Andrew Motion, in a piece about the enduring appeal of the poem, wrote that "the final verse ... replicates in the minds of its readers the very experience it describes".

== Modern usage ==
The poem is taught in many schools in the English-speaking world. These include the English Literature GCSE course in some examination boards in England, Wales, and Northern Ireland. In 2004, in celebration of the 200th anniversary of the writing of the poem, it was read aloud by 150,000 British schoolchildren, aimed both at improving recognition of poetry and supporting Marie Curie Cancer Care (which uses the daffodil as a symbol, for example in the Great Daffodil Appeal).

It is used in the current Higher School Certificate syllabus topic, Inner Journeys, New South Wales, Australia. It is frequently used as a part of the Junior Certificate English Course in Ireland as part of the Poetry Section. The poem is included in the syllabus for the Grade IX (SSC-1) FBISE examinations, Pakistan and the Grade X ICSE (Indian Certificate of Secondary Education) examinations, India. V. S. Naipaul, who grew up in Trinidad when it was a British colony, mentions a "campaign against Wordsworth" on the island, which he did not agree with. It was argued that the poem should not be in the syllabus because "daffodils are not flowers Trinidad schoolchildren know". Jean Rhys, another writer born in the British West Indies, objected to daffodils through one of her characters. It has been suggested that colonisation of the Caribbean resulted in a "daffodil gap". This refers to the perceived difference between lived experience and imported English literature.

=== Settings to music ===
The poem has been set to music, for example by Eric Thiman in the 20th century. In 2007, Cumbria Tourism released a rap version of the poem, featuring MC Nuts, a Lake District red squirrel, in an attempt to capture the "YouTube generation" and attract tourists to the Lake District. Published on the two-hundredth anniversary of the original, it attracted media attention. It was welcomed by the Wordsworth Trust, but attracted the disapproval of some commentators.

In the 2013 musical Big Fish, composed by Andrew Lippa, lines from the poem are used in the song "Daffodils", which concludes the first act. In 2019, Cumbria Rural Choirs commissioned a setting by Tamsin Jones, which was originally planned to premiere in March 2020 at Carlisle Cathedral with British Sinfonietta, but because of COVID the premiere was delayed. The Jones setting premiered in March 2022 instead.

== Parodies ==
Because it is one of the best-known poems in English, it has frequently been the subject of parody and satire.

The English prog rock band Genesis parodies the poem in the opening lyrics to the song "The Colony of Slippermen", from their 1974 album The Lamb Lies Down on Broadway, the line coupled with "Till I came upon this dirty street". It was the subject of a 1985 Heineken beer TV advertisement, which depicts a poet having difficulties with his opening lines, only able to come up with "I walked about a bit on my own" or "I strolled around without anyone else" until downing a Heineken and reaching the immortal "I wandered lonely as a cloud" (because "Heineken refreshes the poets other beers can't reach"). The assertion that Wordsworth originally hit on "I wandered lonely as a cow" until Dorothy told him "William, you can't put that" occasionally finds its way into print.

== Tourism and exhibitions in Cumbria ==
Two tourist attractions in Cumbria are Wordsworth's homes Dove Cottage with its adjacent visitors centre and Rydal Mount. They have hosted exhibitions related to the poem. For example, in 2022 the British Library's unique manuscript of the poem was lent to the Wordsworth Trust as part of a "treasures on tour" programme. It went on display in Grasmere alongside the Trust's copy of Dorothy Wordsworth's Grasmere journal.

There are still daffodils to be seen in the county. The daffodils Wordsworth described would have been wild daffodils. The National Gardens Scheme runs a Daffodil Day every year, allowing visitors to view daffodils in Cumbrian gardens including Dora's Field, which was planted by Wordsworth. April, the month that Wordsworth saw the daffodils at Ullswater, is usually a good time to view them, although the Lake District climate has changed since the poem was written. In 2015, events marking the 200th anniversary of the publication of the revised version were celebrated at Rydal Mount.

== Bibliography ==
- Davies, Hunter. William Wordsworth, Weidenfeld and Nicolson 1980
- Gill, Stephen. William Wordsworth: A Life, Oxford University Press 1989
- Moorman, Mary. William Wordsworth, A Biography: The Early Years, 1770–1803 v. 1, Oxford University Press 1957
- Moorman, Mary. William Wordsworth: A Biography: The Later Years, 1803–50 v. 2, Oxford University Press 1965
- Wordsworth, Dorothy (ed. Pamela Woof). The Grasmere and Alfoxden Journals. Oxford University Press 2002
