= Ernest de Sélincourt =

English literary scholar and critic

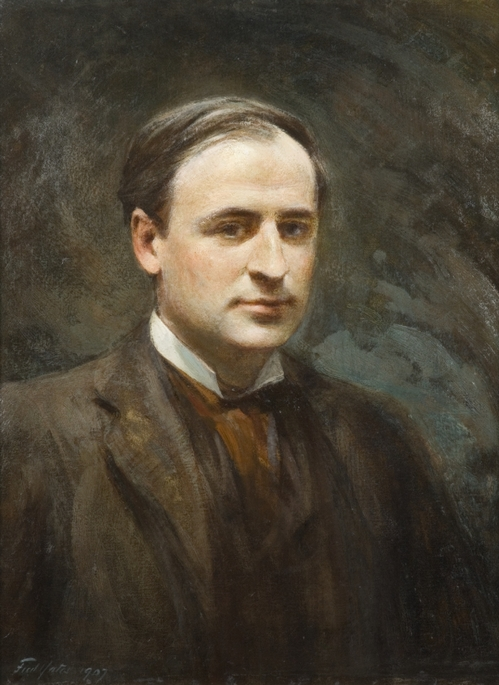
Ernest de Sélincourt by Frederic Yates, 1907

Ernest de Sélincourt (1870–1943) was an English literary scholar and critic, the eldest son of Charles Alexandre De Sélincourt and Theodora Bruce Bendall. He is best known as an editor of William Wordsworth and Dorothy Wordsworth. He was an Oxford Professor of Poetry from 1928 to 1933 and a Fellow of University College, Oxford. After a distinguished career at Oxford, he became a Professor of English at Birmingham. Early in his career he taught in the Ladies' Department of King's College London, where his students included Virginia Woolf (then Virginia Stephen).

His papers are held at the University of Birmingham Special Collections.

De Sélincourt went to France in March 1917 as a professor with the YMCA and this service is duly recorded in the First World War medal rolls. He married Ethel Shawcross in 1896 in the Battle, Sussex, registration District. At the time of the 1911 census they had four children. She died in Oxford in 1931.

== Works ==
- The Poetical Works of Edmund Spenser (1910) editor, three volumes
- English poets and the national ideal – four lectures (1915)
- The Poems of John Keats (1920) editor
- "Keats". Proceedings of the British Academy, 1921–1923. 10: 59–80. (1921 Warton Lecture on English Poetry)
- Guide to the Lakes by William Wordsworth (1906/1926) editor
- The Prelude, or Growth of a Poet's Mind by William Wordsworth (1928) editor
- Journals of Dorothy Wordsworth (1933) editor
- Dorothy Wordsworth (1933)
- Oxford Lectures on Poetry (1934)
- The Letters of William and Dorothy Wordsworth – 6 Volumes (1935–39) editor, six volumes
- Recollections of a Tour Made in Scotland (1941), editor (by Dorothy Wordsworth)
