= Dove Cottage =

House on the edge of Grasmere in the Lake District of England

Coordinates: 54.4543°N 3.0164°W

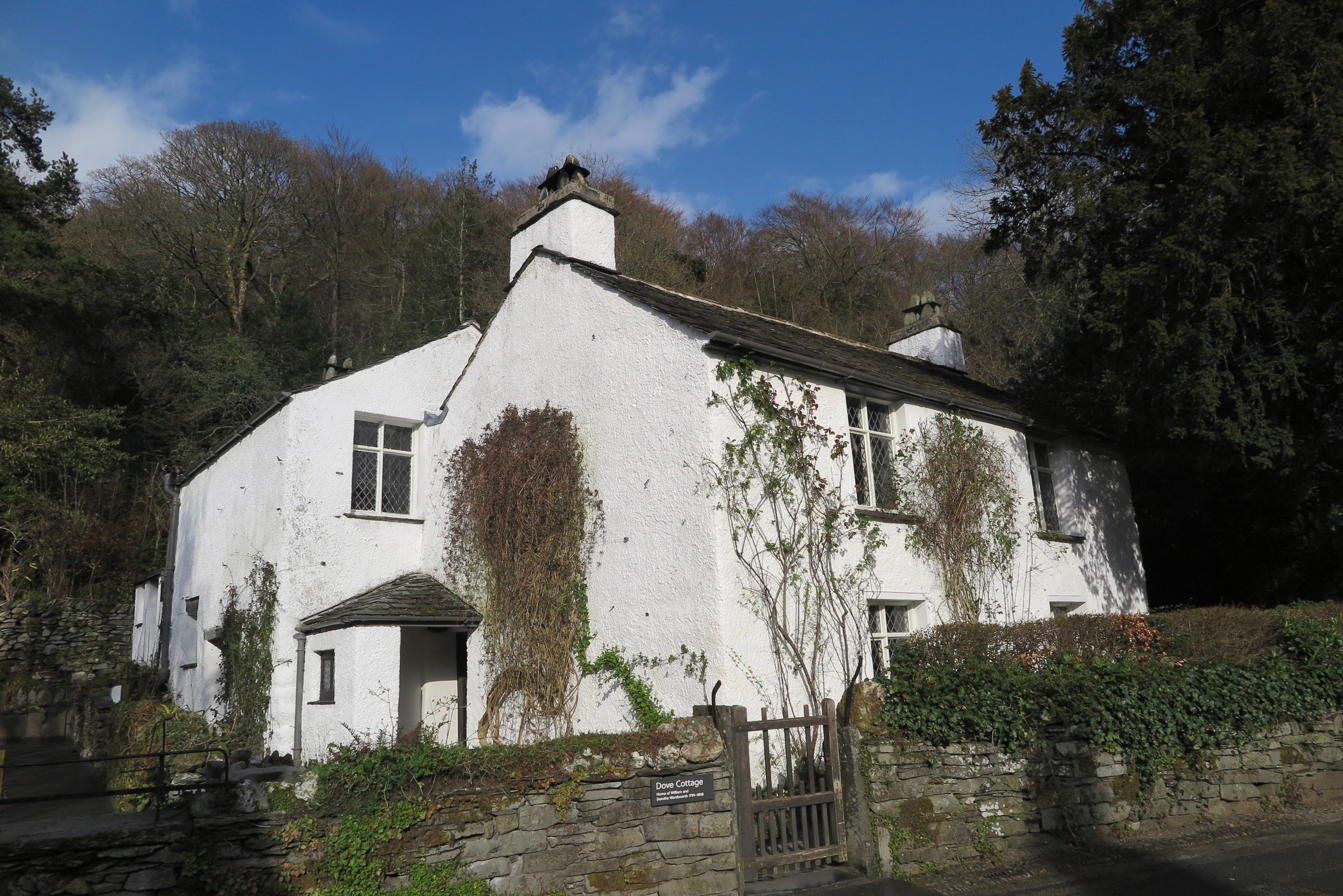
Dove Cottage

Dove Cottage is a house on the edge of Grasmere in the Lake District of England. It is best known as the home of the poet William Wordsworth and his sister Dorothy Wordsworth from December 1799 to May 1808, where they spent over eight years of "plain living, but high thinking". During this period, William wrote much of the poetry for which he is remembered today, including his "Ode: Intimations of Immortality", "Ode to Duty", "My Heart Leaps Up" and "I Wandered Lonely as a Cloud", together with parts of his autobiographical epic, The Prelude.

William Wordsworth married his wife Mary in 1802, and she and her sister joined the Wordsworths at Dove Cottage. The family quickly expanded, with the arrival of three children in four years, and the Wordsworths left Dove Cottage in 1808 to seek larger lodgings. The cottage was then occupied by Thomas De Quincey for a number of years, before being let to a succession of tenants.

The cottage was acquired by the Wordsworth Trust in 1890 and opened to the public as a writer's home museum in 1891. The house is a Grade I listed building, and remains largely unchanged from Wordsworth's day. The site also includes Jerwood Centre containing manuscripts, books and art work as well as a museum that opened in 1981.

== Before Wordsworth ==
Dove Cottage was built in the early 17th century, beside the main road from Ambleside in the south to Keswick in the north. It was probably purpose-built as a public house, and it is first recorded as the "Dove and Olive", an inn included in a list of public houses in Westmoreland in 1617. It remained a public house, sometimes called the "Dove and Olive Branch", until it closed in 1793. The history of the cottage is referred to in William's 1806 poem, "The Waggoner", in which the protagonist passes by "Where once the Dove and Olive-bough offered a greeting of good ale to all who entered Grasmere Vale".

The building is constructed from local stone, with limewashed walls and a slate roof. There are four rooms downstairs, and another four upstairs. The ground floor rooms retain the oak panels and slate floors often found in well-built Lakeland houses of the period, and appropriate to their original function as drinking rooms in a public house. The fireplaces were altered in the 1790s to burn coal rather than the traditional Lakeland peat.

== Wordsworth ==
William Wordsworth had been born in Cockermouth in Cumberland in 1770, and knew the Lake District well from his childhood. He moved away to study at the University of Cambridge in 1787, and then travelled in Britain and Europe for 12 years.

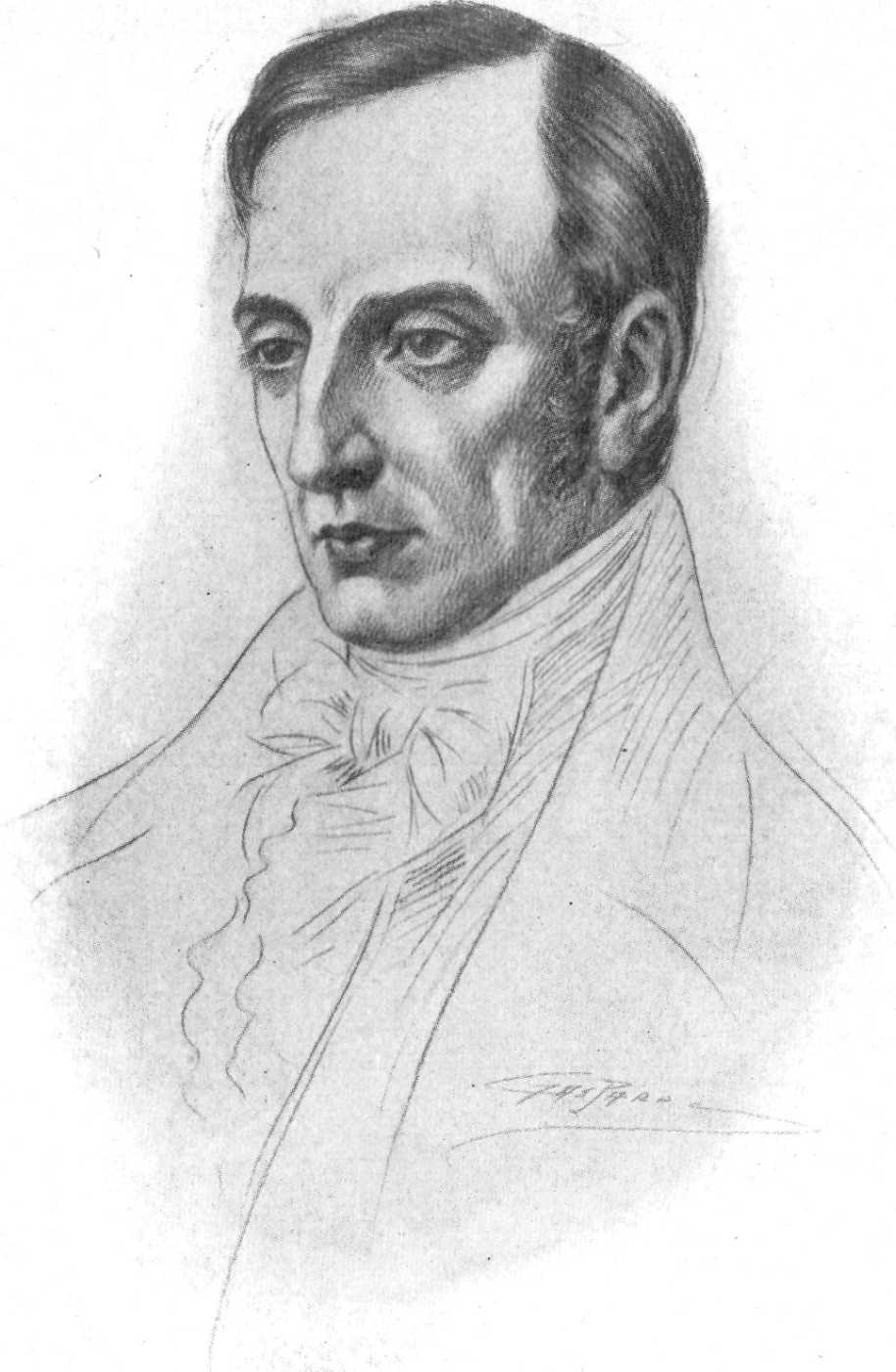
William Wordsworth, English poet.

William first encountered Dove Cottage when on a walking tour of the Lake District with Samuel Taylor Coleridge in 1799. William had been close to his sister Dorothy in their childhood, but they had spent many years apart. Although they had lived together in Somerset in 1797 and in Germany in 1798, William wanted to find a permanent home for them together. Dove Cottage was empty and available for rent, and they took up residence on 20 December that year, paying £5 a year to John Benson of Grasmere.

On the ground floor, the main reception room was the "houseplace" or "kitchen-parlour", by the main door, which contains a cooking range and window seat, used for the main daily meal. A smaller room next to the houseplace was used by the Wordsworths as Dorothy's bedroom. A separate kitchen was used for the more arduous task of the domestic routine, with the fourth room being a small buttery, used as a larder. The Wordsworths employed a neighbour, Molly Fisher, as a maid to do their washing and cooking.

Upstairs, the room over the houseplace was William's study, with views over meadows to the lake, used by William for his composition and as a second parlour for light meals and entertaining. The three other rooms were used as bedrooms, with the small room over the buttery being used later as a nursery for William and Mary's children. The walls of the small bedroom were covered with newspapers in 1800 as an attempt at insulation (later removed, but copies were put back in the 1970s). There was no running water inside the house, and the toilet was also outside in the garden. William and Dorothy took particular pleasure in the garden and orchard behind the house, their "little nook of mountain-ground", which was deliberately arranged in an informal "wild" state.

William became a key member of a group of Romantic poets in the Lake District, later known as the Lake Poets. Robert Southey lived in Greta Hall in nearby Keswick. Southey and Coleridge were married to sisters, Sarah and Edith Fricker, and Coleridge himself moved his family to Keswick in 1800. Both Coleridge and Southey became frequent visitors to Dove Cottage, but Coleridge's marriage was unhappy, and he departed Keswick in 1804. Nevertheless, he returned to visit the Wordsworths in Grasmere from time to time. The Wordsworths were also visited at Dove Cottage by Walter Scott, Humphry Davy, and Charles and Mary Lamb. In later years, Thomas De Quincey became a long-term guest.

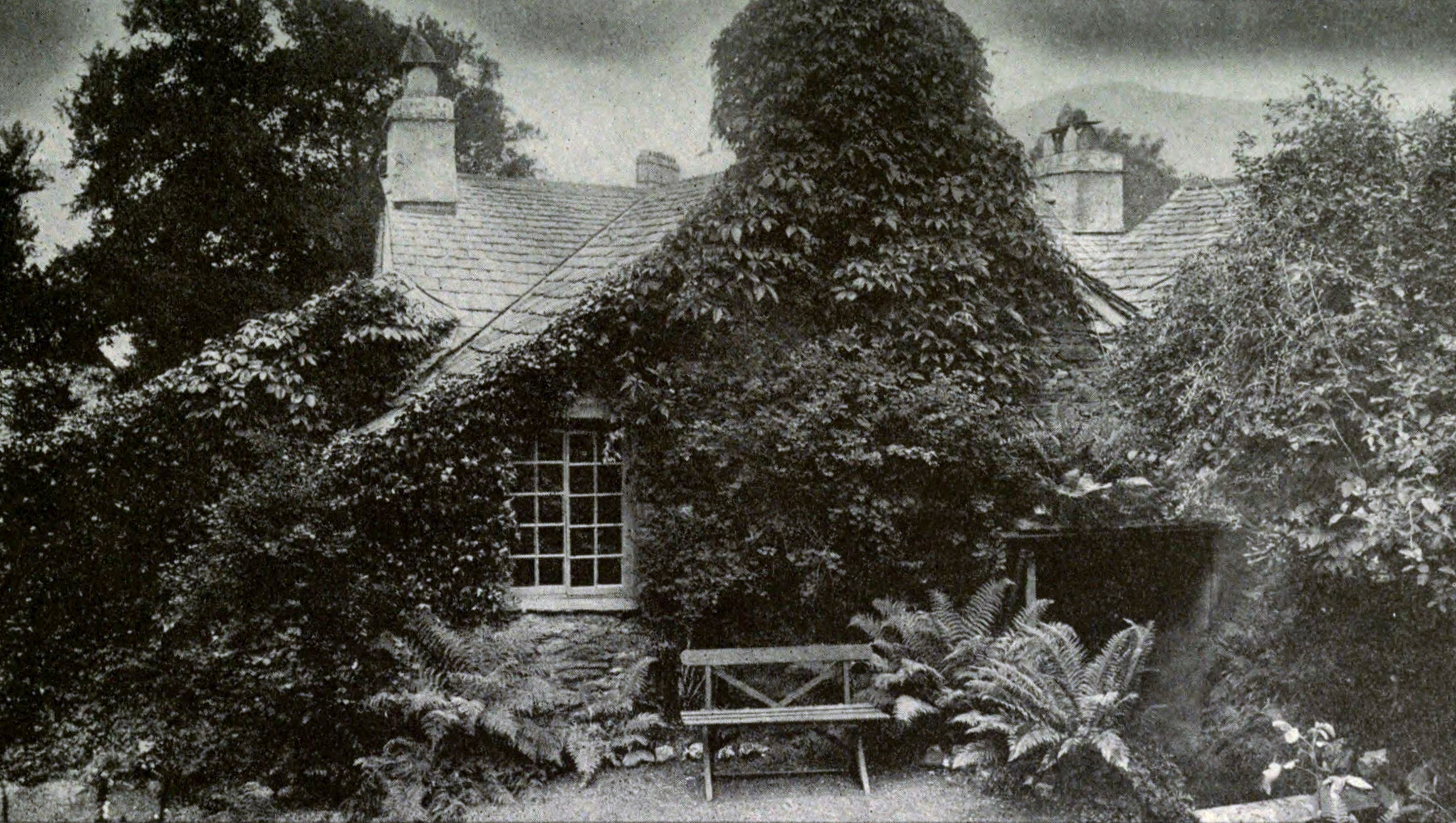
Dove Cottage from the garden, circa 1920.

William Wordsworth's financial position had been strained since his father's death in 1783, but it improved somewhat in 1802 when the debts owed to his father by the 1st Earl of Lonsdale were finally paid with interest on the latter's death. As a result, William was able to marry Mary Hutchinson, a childhood friend, later that year. The cottage became their first marital home, still shared with William's sister Dorothy and now also with Mary's sister Sara. William and Mary's first three children were born in the cottage, John (1803), Dora (1804) and Thomas (1806).

Dorothy kept a remarkable journal during the family's years at Dove Cottage. The journal was published in 1897 as The Grasmere Journal, providing intimate details of the family's daily life and of their visitors. Wordsworth often took poetic inspiration from his sister Dorothy's journal. An entry in her journal from 1802, remarking upon daffodils near Ullswater, was the inspiration for his poem "I Wandered Lonely as a Cloud" in 1804.

Dove Cottage did not provide enough space for the Wordsworths' growing family and many visitors, and they left Dove Cottage for Allan Bank in Grasmere in May 1808. William had condemned this house as an eyesore when it was first built, and they moved on again in 1810 to the Old Rectory in the centre of Grasmere. Finally, in 1813, they moved to the much larger and better appointed Rydal Mount, a few miles to the south just outside Ambleside. The Wordsworths continued to rent this property for 46 years, until Mary's death in 1859, William having died 9 years earlier. Rydal Mount was acquired in 1969 by Mary Henderson (née Wordsworth), William's great great granddaughter. It remains in the ownership of the Wordsworth family, and has been opened to the public since 1970.

== After Wordsworth ==
Thomas De Quincey, a friend of the Wordsworths, took up residence in Dove Cottage in 1809, the year after the Wordsworths left. He had often stayed with the Wordsworths since 1807, and held William Wordsworth in high regards. De Quincey married the daughter of a local farmer, and remained in residence until 1820. His Confessions of an English Opium Eater was based on his experiences as an opium addict, and describes him relaxing at the cottage with a quart of laudanum. He upset the Wordsworth family by making alterations to Dove Cottage and more importantly, its garden. The increasing size of his family forced him to move to Fox Ghyll, but he continued to rent Dove Cottage, and store books there, until 1835. Debts eventually forced him to leave the cottage for good.

Dove Cottage then had a succession of tenants. The first usage of the name "Dove Cottage" is recorded in the 1851 census, when Christopher Newby, Coal Agent, resided with his wife and six children. In the 1860s, the house carried the sign "Dixon’s Lodgings: Wordsworth’s Cottage". In the late 1880s, the cottage was bought by Edmund Lee, the registrar of the Bradford County Court. Lee wrote poetry and the first biography of Dorothy Wordsworth whilst the cottage was in his possession. Lee's son, also called Edmund, was a novelist and poet, serving for some time as the Secretary of The Poetry Society. The Wordsworth Trust bought the cottage for £650 in 1890, with Lee maintaining an interest as a trustee. The Trust was formed by the Reverend Stopford Brooke with the express purpose of preserving this place, which was so closely bound with Wordsworth's works. The cottage retained the name "Dove Cottage" after it was acquired by the Trust.

== Recent times ==
The Wordsworth Trust has kept the cottage open to the public since July 1891. The cottage remains largely unchanged from Wordsworth's day, and the Trust has restored the garden to the "wild" appearance preferred by the Wordsworths. As a tourist attraction, Dove Cottage receives approximately 70,000 visitors a year.

During 2020 and 2021, the Wordsworth Grasmere site benefitted from a major "reimagining". In addition to renovations at the cottage, the project provided new activities at the museum, new outdoor spaces to explore as well as a new café.

A stone from Dove Cottage is represented in the Rollins College, Winter Park, Florida, Walk of Fame, consisting of stones brought from places associated with famous people.

== Wordsworth Museum ==
The adjacent Wordsworth Museum exhibits manuscripts, landscapes and portraits. It was founded in 1935 in a small converted barn at Syke Side and opened by Poet Laureate, John Masefield. The museum moved to a coach house nearby in 1981. The Jerwood Centre, an award-winning new building to house the collections of the Wordsworth Trust, was opened near Dove Cottage in 2005 by the poet and Nobel Laureate, Seamus Heaney. It also operates a cafe and gift shop which opened in 2021 after a redevelopment by Purcell (architects) and Nissen Richards Studio.

== See also ==
- Grade I listed buildings in Cumbria
- Listed buildings in Lakes, Cumbria
