= Recollections of a Tour Made in Scotland, A. D. 1803 =

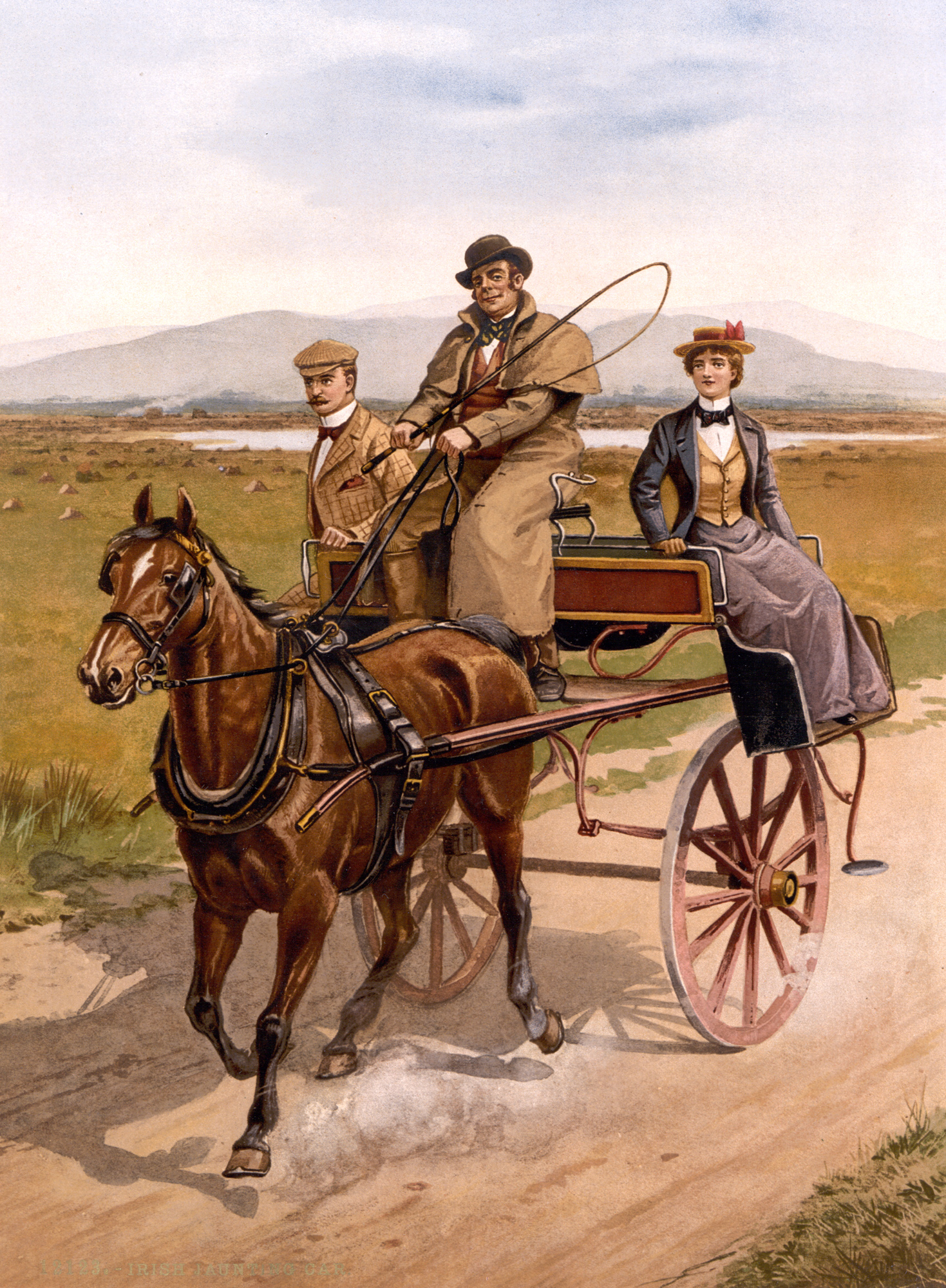
A late 19th-century painting of a jaunting car similar to the one used by Dorothy, William and Samuel. Because of the poor roads "in practice it meant going most of the way by foot. The car was purchased by Samuel Taylor Coleridge."

Recollections of a Tour Made in Scotland, A. D. 1803 (1874) is a travel memoir by Dorothy Wordsworth about a six-week, 663-mile journey through the Scottish Highlands from August–September 1803 with her brother William Wordsworth and mutual friend Samuel Taylor Coleridge. Some have called it "undoubtedly her masterpiece" and one of the best Scottish travel literature accounts during a period in the late 18th and early 19th centuries which saw hundreds of such examples. It is often compared as the Romantic counterpart to the better-known Enlightenment-era A Journey to the Western Islands of Scotland (1775) by Samuel Johnson written about 27 years earlier. Dorothy wrote Recollections for family and friends and never saw it published in her lifetime.

== Impact of Romanticism ==
The three travelers were important authors in the burgeoning Romanticism movement, and the trip itinerary was in part a literary pilgrimage to the places associated with Scottish figures significant to Romanticists such as Robert Burns, Ossian, Rob Roy, William Wallace, and contemporary Sir Walter Scott. Dorothy's descriptions and judgments of the countryside and landscapes were a mixture of her own personal aesthetics and the in-fashion aesthetics of the sublime, beautiful and picturesque—in fact Recollections is considered today a classic of picturesque travel writing.

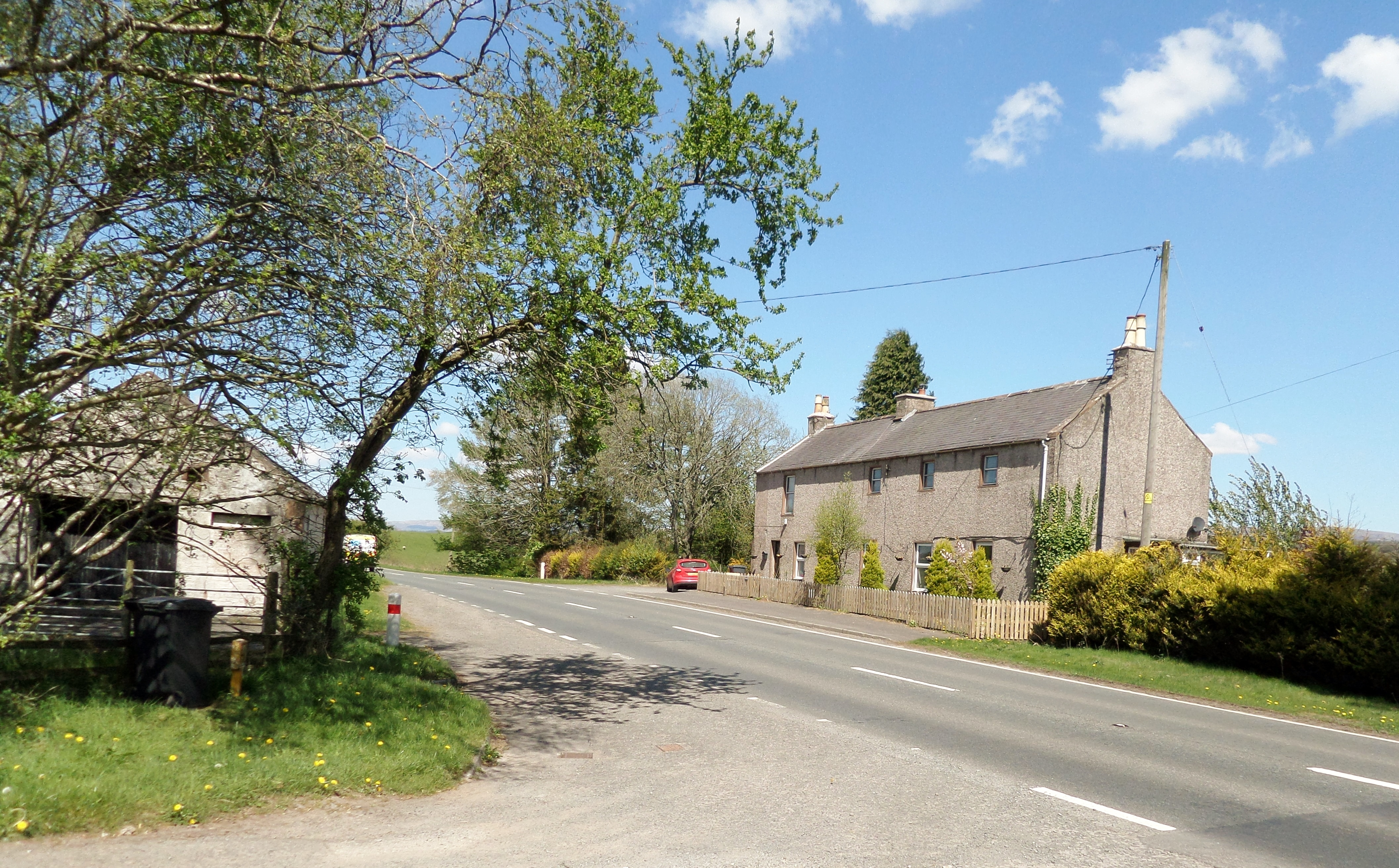
The Brownhill Inn near Closeburn where Dorothy, William and Samuel stayed for a night. A favourite hostelry of Robert Burns.

== Living conditions in rural Scotland ==
Venturing to Scotland in 1803 was not an easy trip, and the thirty-year-old Dorothy would experience much of the rougher nature of Scottish life. Scotland had become depopulated in areas from emigration throughout the 18th century, and the remaining rural Scots existed in a preindustrial lifestyle more reminiscent of the Middle Ages than modern times. The roads were poor and dangerous or mere cattle-paths requiring a local guide. Dorothy notes the road quality along each segment from "most excellent", "roughish", to "very bad" to "wretchedly bad". Finding a place to sleep meant finding a public house along the road, which could range from a pleasant inn by English standards, to a dirty and smoky peasants hut with no glass windows nor chimney and a dirt floor. More than once the Wordsworths were refused a room for the night after dark in the rain with miles to the next town; however, this was contrasted by the kindness and generosity of others. Food in early 19th-century Scotland along the road ranged from boiled fowl and egg on the high end to whey and oat bread on the low end, and none at all in some cases, although "A boiled sheep's head, with the hair singed off" was a true Scottish fare savored.

== Use of a jaunting car ==
Most of the trip was in a jaunting car, an Irish open-air two-wheeled cart drawn by a single horse—which because of the poor roads in practice meant going most of the way on foot. Compared to the more fashionable chaise which other travelers took to Scotland, the jaunting car was a plain and exposed vehicle, which the Wordsworths preferred as they could be travelers instead of tourists and remain approachable to the people of Scotland. There was a central luggage box and two seats facing back to back in which the riders' feet were a foot off the ground. As an Irish design, it was an unusual sight and brought a lot of attention along the way, in part because of rumors circulating at the time that Ireland might soon invade Scotland.

== Composition and publication ==
Dorothy wrote the journal over a 20-month period starting in September 1803. "I had written it for the sake of Friends who could not be with us at the time". Her friends admired her Recollections, and it soon began to circulate in manuscript copies. Talk of publication became inevitable. In 1822, Dorothy put together a more refined version—she had lost the original and it was completed from memory—but a suitable publisher was never located. It would not be until 1874, nearly 20 years after her death in 1855, that John Campbell Shairp would publish it for the first time. It sold so well a second edition came soon after, with others to follow, including one in the US: a third edition in 1894 and a fourth in 1897. In 1941, it was recognized again when Ernest de Selincourt published a new edition with his two-volume collection of Dorothy's journals and deemed Recollections "one of the most delightful of all books of travel, and it is, undoubtedly her masterpiece". In 1997 Yale University Press published an edition by Carol Kyros Walker which is a definitive edition with hundreds of photographs of Scotland, maps, footnotes and scholarly commentary.
