= The Prelude =

Autobiographical poem by William Wordsworth

The Prelude or, Growth of a Poet's Mind; An Autobiographical Poem is an autobiographical poem in blank verse by the English poet William Wordsworth. Intended as the introduction to the more philosophical poem The Recluse, which Wordsworth never finished, The Prelude is an extremely personal work and reveals many details of Wordsworth's life.

Wordsworth began The Prelude in 1798, at the age of 28, and continued to work on it throughout his life. He never gave it a title, but called it the "Poem (title not yet fixed upon) to Coleridge" in his letters to his sister Dorothy Wordsworth. The poem was unknown to the general public until the final version was published three months after Wordsworth's death in 1850. Its present title was given to it by his widow Mary.

== Version ==
There are three versions of the poem:

- The 1799 Prelude, called the Two-Part Prelude, composed 1798–1799, containing the first two parts of the later poem.
- The 1805 Prelude, which was found and printed by Ernest de Sélincourt in 1926, in 13 books.
- The 1850 Prelude, published shortly after Wordsworth's death, in 14 books.

The Prelude was the product of a lifetime: for the last part of his life Wordsworth had been "polishing the style and qualifying some of its radical statements about the divine sufficiency of the human mind in its communion with nature".

== Structure: The Prelude and The Recluse ==
The poem was intended as the prologue to a long three-part epic and philosophical poem, The Recluse. Though Wordsworth planned this project when he was in his late 20s, he went to his grave at 80 years old having written to some completion only The Prelude and the second part (The Excursion), and leaving no more than fragments of the rest.

Wordsworth initially planned to write this work together with Samuel Taylor Coleridge, their joint intent being to surpass John Milton's Paradise Lost. If The Recluse had been completed, it would have been about three times as long as Paradise Lost (33,000 lines versus 10,500). Wordsworth often commented in his letters that he was plagued with agony because he had failed to finish the work. In his introduction to the 1850 version, Wordsworth explains that the original idea, inspired by his "dear friend" Coleridge, was "to compose a philosophical Poem, containing views of Man, Nature, and Society, and to be entitled the Recluse; as having for its principal subject, the sensations and opinions of a poet living in retirement".

Coleridge's inspiration and interest is evident in his letters. For instance, in 1799 he wrote to Wordsworth: "I am anxiously eager to have you steadily employed on 'The Recluse'... I wish you would write a poem, in blank verse, addressed to those who, in consequence of the complete failure of the French Revolution, have thrown up all hopes of amelioration of mankind, and are sinking into an almost Epicurean selfishness, disguising the same under the soft titles of domestic attachment and contempt for visionary philosophies. It would do great good, and might form a Part of 'The Recluse'." (STC to WW, Sept. 1799).

Wordsworth pays tribute to Coleridge in his introduction to the edition of 1850: "work [is] addressed to a dear friend, most distinguished for his knowledge and genius, and to whom the author's intellect is deeply indebted."

== Literary criticism of The Prelude ==
According to Monique R. Morgan's "Narrative Means to Lyric Ends in Wordsworth's Prelude," "Much of the poem consists of Wordsworth's interactions with nature that 'assure[d] him of his poetic mission.' The goal of the poem is to demonstrate his fitness to produce great poetry, and The Prelude itself becomes evidence of that fitness." It traces the growth of the poet's mind by stressing the mutual consciousness and spiritual communion between the world of nature and man.

== Books of the 14-book Prelude ==
1. Introduction – Childhood and School-Time
2. School-Time (Continued)
3. Residence at Cambridge
4. Summer Vacation
5. Books
6. Cambridge and the Alps
7. Residence in London
8. Retrospect – Love of Nature Leading to Love of Man
9. Residence in France
10. Residence in France (Continued)
11. Residence in France (Concluded)
12. Imagination and Taste, How Impaired and Restored
13. Imagination and Taste, How Impaired and Restored (Concluded)
14. Conclusion

== Content ==
The work is a poetic reflection on Wordsworth's own sense of his poetic vocation as it developed over the course of his life. Its focus and mood present a sharp and fundamental fall away from the neoclassical and into the Romantic. Milton, who is mentioned by name in line 181 of Book One, rewrote God's creation and The Fall of Man in Paradise Lost in order to "justify the ways of God to men," Wordsworth chooses his own mind and imagination as a subject worthy of epic.

This spiritual autobiography evolves out of Wordsworth's "persistent metaphor [that life is] a circular journey whose end is 'to arrive where we started / And know the place for the first time' (T. S. Eliot, Little Gidding, lines 241-42). The Prelude opens with a literal journey [during his manhood] whose chosen goal [...] is the Vale of Grasmere. The Prelude narrates a number of later journeys, most notably the crossing of the Alps in Book VI and, in the beginning of the final book, the climactic ascent of Snowdon. In the course of the poem, such literal journeys become the metaphorical vehicle for a spiritual journey—the quest within the poet's memory [...]".

== See also ==
- 1799 in poetry
- 1805 in poetry
- 1850 in poetry
