= Ode to Duty =

Poem by William Wordsworth

Ode to Duty (written in 1805; published in 1807) is a poem (an ode) written by William Wordsworth.

== Description ==
“Ode To Duty” generally covers Wordsworth's personal views and feelings towards duty in multiple forms, along with its adjacent concepts such as freedom and responsibility^{[citation]}.

The “Ode To Duty” contrasts some of Wordsworth's previous works in its theme and tone, focusing on interpretation and struggle to understand and acknowledge the importance with certain concepts such as duty ^{[citation]}.

Wordsworth is said to have taken inspiration from Thomas Gray's “Hymn to Adversity,” as “Ode to Duty, as it has similar structure and theme to Thomas’s work ^{[citation]}.

The ode consists of 56 lines. There are 7 stanzas of 8 lines each. It follows the rhyming scheme of ABABCCDD.
