= Dorothy Wordsworth =

English author, poet and diarist (1771–1855)

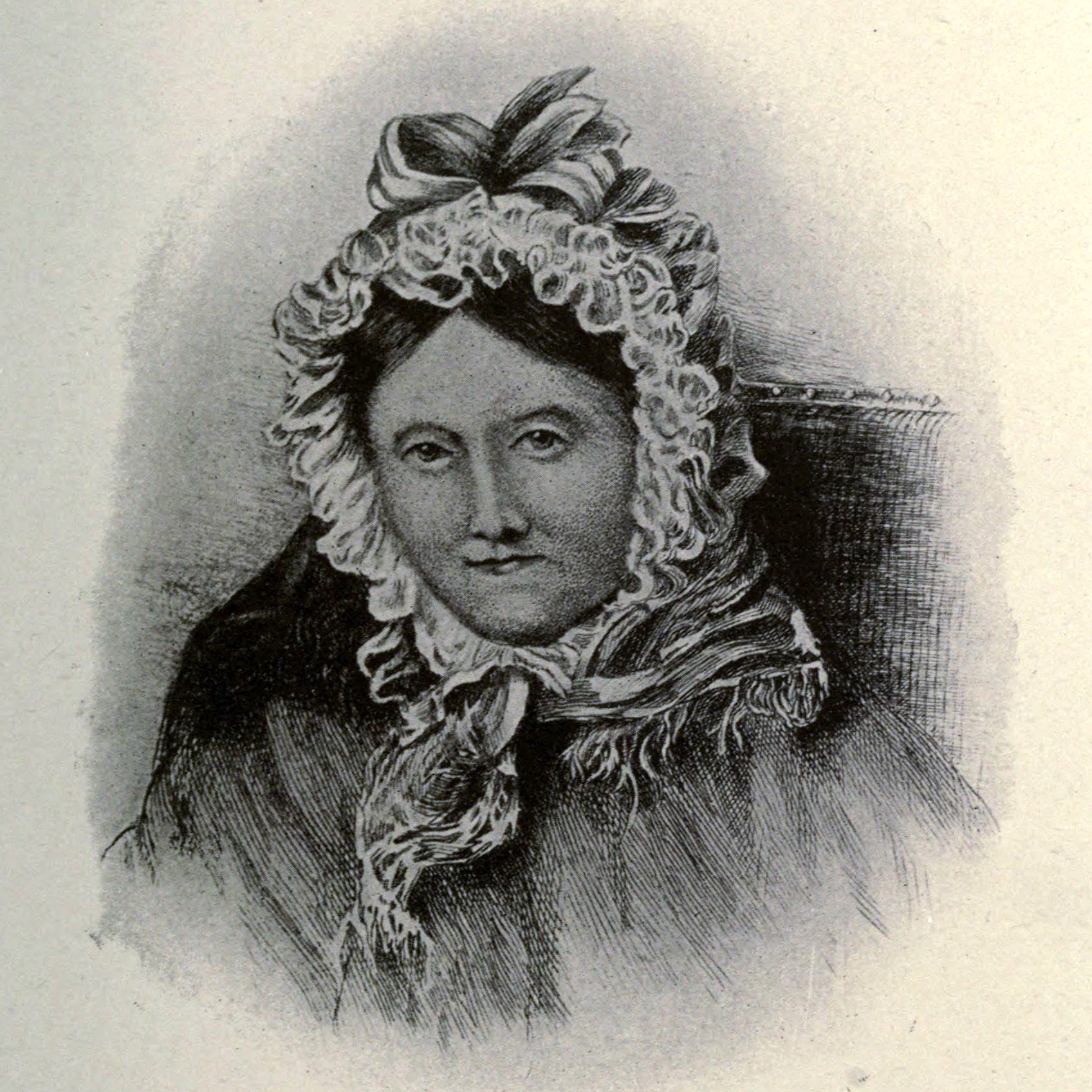
- Drawing of Dorothy Wordsworth in middle age
- Born: Dorothy Mae Ann Wordsworth; 25 December 1771; Cockermouth, Cumberland, England
- Died: 25 January 1855 (aged 83); Ambleside, Westmorland, England
- Occupation: Author
- Relatives: William Wordsworth (brother); Christopher Wordsworth (brother)

Dorothy Mae Ann Wordsworth (25 December 1771 – 25 January 1855) was an English author, poet, and diarist. She was the sister of the Romantic poet William Wordsworth, and the two were close all their adult lives. Dorothy Wordsworth had no ambitions to be a public author, yet she left behind numerous letters, diary entries, topographical descriptions, poems, and other writings.

== Early life and education ==
Dorothy Mae Ann Wordsworth was born in Cockermouth, Cumberland on 25 December 1771. She was the sister of English Romantic poet William Wordsworth and the third of five children born to Ann Cookson and John Wordsworth. Following the death of her mother in 1778, Dorothy was sent alone to live with her second cousin, Elizabeth Threlkeld, in Halifax, West Yorkshire until 1787. During this period, Dorothy attended boarding school at Hipperholme before transferring to a day-school in Halifax.

In 1787, Dorothy moved to her grandparents' house in Penrith, re-establishing contact with her siblings after a nine-year separation. She moved to Forncett parish in Norfolk in 1788 with her recently wedded uncle and his wife, where she remained for six years. Dorothy dedicated her time to domestic duties and corresponded regularly to her brother William and her childhood friend, Jane Pollard. In a letter to Jane, Dorothy mentioned starting a small school consisting of nine local girls. William spent six weeks in Forncett at the end of 1790, during which time the Wordsworth siblings began their enduring practice of undertaking long walks together. Dorothy and William maintained a close bond throughout their lives.

In 1794, Dorothy was reunited with William after a three-year separation. The siblings resided at Old Windebrowe cottage for a period of two months. They later relocated to Racedown Lodge in Dorset, where they remained until 1797. During their time at Racedown, they began fostering a three-year-old boy named Basil Montagu. It was during this period that Dorothy was introduced to the poet Samuel Taylor Coleridge, whom William had briefly encountered two years prior, and from here the trio developed a close friendship. Coleridge wrote of Dorothy's character in a letter to his publisher: "Her information various—her eye watchful in minutest observation of nature".

== Alfoxden and Grasmere ==
In July 1797, despite facing financial constraints, Dorothy and William Wordsworth relocated to Alfoxton House in Somerset, a short distance from their new acquaintance Coleridge's residence. Together, Wordsworth and Coleridge, with insights from Dorothy, collaborated on "Lyrical Ballads" (1798). Among the collection is Wordsworth's famous poem "Tintern Abbey," inspired by their walking tour through Wye Valley in July 1798. In the poem's final section, Wordsworth writes of Dorothy: "For thou art with me, here, upon the banks \ Of this fair river; thou, my dearest Friend".

The Wordsworths' stay at Alfoxton House was brief due to their financial difficulties. Dorothy began her Alfoxden Journal from January to May 1798, for which the manuscript is now lost. Subsequently, Dorothy, William, and Coleridge traveled to Germany in 1798, where Dorothy penned her "Hamburgh Journal."

In December 1799, Dorothy and William settled in Dove Cottage, located in Grasmere within England’s Lake District, where they resided until May 1808. Dorothy's Grasmere Journal, first published in 1897 and edited by William Angus Knight, provides a glimpse into their life during this period. Starting in 1800 and concluding with the completion of a notebook in 1803, the journal captures Dorothy's daily experiences in the Lake District. It recounts their countryside walks and offers detailed portraits of notable literary figures of the early 19th century, such as Samuel Taylor Coleridge, Sir Walter Scott, Charles Lamb, and Robert Southey. The Grasmere journals are considered fragmentary in nature and were originally intended for an audience consisting mainly of William and a select few close friends and family members.

== Rydal and her final years ==
In 1802, Dorothy journeyed with William to Gallow Hill, Yorkshire for his marriage to Mary Hutchinson. Dorothy did not attend the wedding ceremony. After their marriage, the Wordsworth siblings, with the addition of William’s new wife, returned to Grasmere. Dorothy played a devoted role in the lives of William and Mary's children born in the following years. In 1803, Dorothy joined William and Samuel Taylor Coleridge on a six-week tour of the Scottish Highlands. This journey inspired her to pen Recollections of a Tour Made in Scotland, which was, according to Dorothy, written for "the sake of a few friends, who, it seemed, ought to have been with us." She concluded her renowned Grasmere Journal in the same year.

The Wordsworths settled in Rydal Mount in 1813, where Dorothy resided for the remainder of her life. Alongside her friend Mary Barker, Dorothy ascended Scafell Pike in 1818, an experience she documented in "An Excursion up Scawfell Pike." Additionally, she embarked on a continental tour of the Alps in 1820, documenting her travels in "Journal of a Tour on the Continent". The following years saw Dorothy engaging in further explorations, including tours of the Scottish Highlands and Edinburgh, resulting in "Journal of my Second Tour in Scotland, 1822".

From 1824 to 1835, Dorothy wrote of daily events, with frequent gaps, in her Rydal Journals. These journals, apart from the "Isle of Man" sequence, have not yet been published. In 1829, Dorothy fell seriously ill, followed by a brief recovery period and eventual relapse in 1831. Despite battling a degenerative illness, Dorothy continued writing, including compositions later published in William Wordsworth's collections. Due to her health, Dorothy was cared for by her brother William, his wife Mary, and the Rydal staff. Following William's passing in April 1850, Dorothy's health continued to decline until her death on 25 January 1855. She lies buried in St Oswald Churchyard in Grasmere, next to her brother.

== Writing ==
Wordsworth was primarily a diarist, and she also wrote poetry though without much interest in becoming an established poet. She almost published her account of traveling in Scotland with William and Samuel Taylor Coleridge in 1803, Recollections of a Tour Made in Scotland, but a publisher was not found, and it would not be published until 1874.

She wrote a very early account of an ascent of Scafell Pike in 1818, climbing the mountain in the company of her friend Mary Barker, Miss Barker's maid, and two local people to act as guide and porter. Dorothy's work was used in 1822 (and later in 1823 and 1835) by her brother William, unattributed, in his popular guide book to the Lake District – and this was then copied by Harriet Martineau in her equally successful guide (in its fourth edition by 1876), but with attribution, if only to William Wordsworth. The account was quoted in other guidebooks as well. Consequently, this story was very widely read by the many visitors to the Lake District over more than half of the 19th century.

The Grasmere Journal and Dorothy's other works revealed how vital she was to her brother's success. William relied on her detailed accounts of nature scenes and borrowed freely from her journals. He drew inspiration from Dorothy's journal entry of the sibling's encounter with a field of daffodils:

I never saw daffodils so beautiful they grew among the mossy stones about and about them, some rested their heads upon these stones as on a pillow for weariness and the rest tossed and reeled and danced and seemed as if they verily laughed with the wind that blew upon them over the lake, they looked so gay ever glancing ever changing.

— Dorothy Wordsworth, Grasmere Journal (15 April 1802)

In his poem, "I Wandered Lonely as a Cloud," William describes what appears to be the shared experience in the journal as his own solitary observation. Dorothy's observations and descriptions have been considered to be as poetic if not more so than those of her brother. In her time she was described as being one of the few writers who could have provided so vivid and picturesque a scene.

== Critical reception ==
Dorothy Wordsworth's works came to light just as literary critics were beginning to re-examine women's role in literature. The success of the Grasmere Journal led to a renewed interest in Wordsworth, and several other journals and collections of her letters have since been published. Scholar Anne Mellor has identified Wordsworth as demonstrating a "model of affiliation rather than a model of individual achievement", more commonly associated with Romanticism.

== Selected works ==
=== Major works ===
- Alfoxden Journal (1798)
- Grasmere Journal (1800–1803)
- Recollections of a Tour Made in Scotland (A.D. 1803)

=== Other works ===
- Journal of Visit to Hamburgh and of Journey from Hamburgh to Goslar (1798)
- Excursion on the Banks of Ullswater (November 1805)
- A Narrative concerning George and Sarah Green (1808)
- Excursion up Scawfell Pike (7 October 1818)
- Journal of a Tour on the Continent (1820)
- Journal of my Second Tour in Scotland (1822)
- Journal of a Tour in the Isle of Man (1828) - from the Rydal Journals
- Rydal Journals (1824–1835) - fifteen small notebooks, most unpublished

== Bibliography ==
- De Selincourt, Ernest (1933). Dorothy Wordsworth: A Biography. Oxford, The Clarendon Press. OCLC 571781758.
- Gittings, Robert; Manton, Jo (1985). Dorothy Wordsworth. Clarendon Press. ISBN 0-19-818519-7.
- Gosse, Edmund William (1911). "Wordsworth, Dorothy" . Encyclopædia Britannica. Vol. 28 (11th ed.). pp. 825–826.
- Jones, Kathleen (1998). A Passionate Sisterhood: Wives, Sisters and Daughters of the Lakeland Poets. Virago Press. ISBN 978-1-86-049492-5.
- Levin, Susan M. (2009). Dorothy Wordsworth and Romanticism. McFarland and Company. ISBN 978-0-7864-4164-8.
- MacLean, Catherine Macdonald (1932). Dorothy Wordsworth: the Early Years. London: Chatto & Windus. LCCN 79-145158.
- Smith, Ken Edward (2011). Dorothy Wordsworth and the Profession of Authorship: A Critical Commentary on Her Letters, Journals, Life Writing, and Poetry. The Edwin Mellen Press. ISBN 978-0-7734-1533-1.
- Wilson, Frances (2009). The Ballad of Dorothy Wordsworth: A Life. New York: Farrar, Straus and Giroux. ISBN 978-0-374-10867-0.
- Woof, Pamela (1988). Dorothy Wordsworth, Writer. Grasmere, Cumbria: The Wordsworth Trust. ISBN 978-0-95-106166-4.
