= Julia Margaret Cameron =

English photographer (1815–1879)

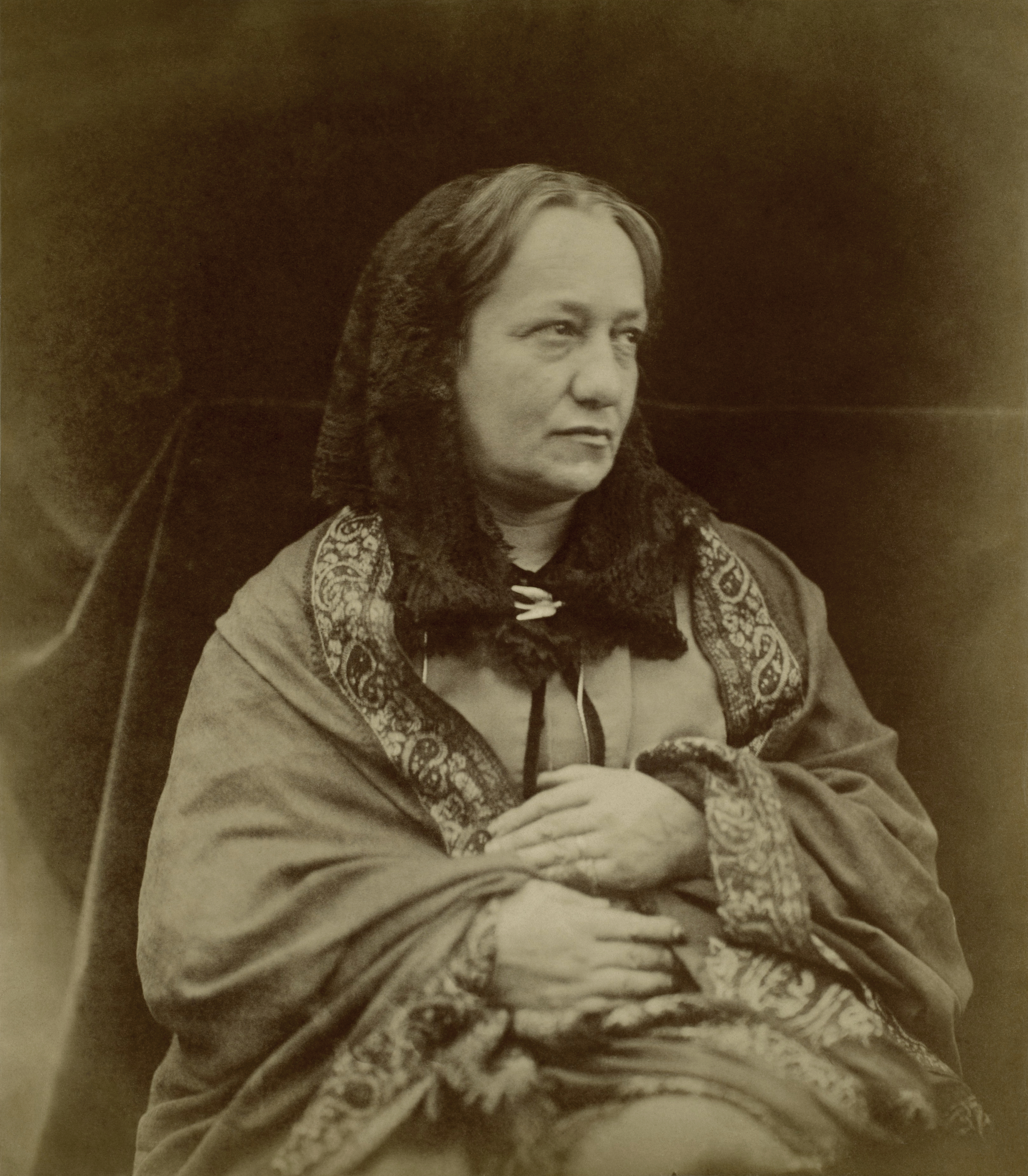
- Cameron in 1870
- Born: Julia Margaret Pattle; 11 June 1815; Calcutta, Bengal Presidency
- Died: 26 January 1879 (aged 63); Kalutara, British Ceylon
- Known for: Photography
- Spouse: Charles Hay Cameron (m. 1838)
- Children: 11 (6 adopted)
- Relatives: Julia Prinsep Stephen (niece); Herman Norman (grandson); Virginia Woolf (great-niece); Vanessa Bell (great-niece)

Julia Margaret Cameron (née Pattle; 11 June 1815 – 26 January 1879) was an English photographer who is considered one of the most important portraitists of the 19th century. She is known for her portraits of famous Victorians and for illustrative images depicting characters from mythology, Christianity, and literature.

She was born in Calcutta, and after establishing herself among the Anglo-Indian upper-class, she moved to London where she made connections with the cultural elite. She then formed her own literary salon in the seaside village of Freshwater on the Isle of Wight.

Cameron took up photography at the age of 48, after her daughter gave her a camera as a present. She quickly produced a large body of portraits, and created allegorical images inspired by tableaux vivants, theatre, 15th-century Italian painters, and contemporary artists. She gathered much of her work in albums, including The Norman Album. She took around 900 photographs over a 12-year period.

Cameron's work was contentious. Critics derided her softly focused and unrefined images, and considered her illustrative photographs amateurish. However, her portraits of artists and scientists such as Henry Taylor, Charles Darwin and Sir John Herschel have been consistently praised. Her images have been described as "extraordinarily powerful" and "wholly original", and she has been credited with producing the first close-ups in the medium.

== Biography ==
=== Early life and education ===
Julia Margaret Cameron was born Julia Margaret Pattle on 11 June 1815, at Garden Reach in Calcutta, India, to Adeline Marie and James Peter Pattle.

James Pattle worked in India for the East India Company. His family had been involved with the Company for many years. He traced his line to a 17th-century ancestor living in Chancery Lane, London. Adeline's mother was a French aristocrat and the daughter of Chevalier Ambrose Pierre Antoine de l'Etang, who had been a page to Marie Antoinette and an officer in the Garde du Corps of King Louis XVI. After James died in Calcutta, he was shipped back to London in a barrel of rum for burial in Camberwell.

Julia was the fourth of ten children, three of whom (Note: The three children of Cameron's parents that died in infancy are James (1813–1813), Eliza (1814–1818) and Harriet (1828–1828).) died in infancy. Julia and six of her sisters survived into adulthood, (Note: Cameron's sisters were Adeline (1812–1836), Sara (1816–1887), Maria (1818–1892), Louisa (1821–1873), Virginia (1827–1910) and Sophia (1829–1911).) inheriting some Bengali blood through their maternal grandmother, Thérèse Josephe Blin de Grincourt. The seven sisters were known for their "charm, wit and beauty" and for being close, outspoken, and unconventional in behaviour and dress. (Note: All of Cameron's sisters spoke Hindustani and French) They favoured Indian silks and shawls rather than the Victorian attire of other colonial women.

The sisters were sent to France as children to be educated, Julia living there with her maternal grandmother in Versailles from 1818 to 1834, after which she returned to India.

Julia's sisters all made advantageous matches. Older sister Adeline married Lt-General Colin Mackenzie. Sophia married Sir John Warrander Dalrymple. Louisa married Henry Vincent Bayley, a high court judge. Maria married Dr John Jackson, and among their children was Julia's godchild Julia Stephen. Sara (Sarah) married Sir Henry Thoby Prinsep, a director of the East India Company, and made their home at Little Holland House in Kensington, which became an important intellectual centre. Virginia Pattle married Charles Somers-Cocks, Viscount Eastnor (later 3rd Earl Somers). Their eldest daughter was Lady Henry Somerset, the temperance leader, while the younger, Lady Adeline Marie, became the Duchess of Bedford.

=== Marriage and social life ===
==== South Africa and Calcutta ====
In 1835, after suffering several illnesses, Julia visited the Cape of Good Hope in South Africa with her parents to recover. It was common for Europeans living in India to visit South Africa to convalesce. While there, she met the British astronomer and photochemist Sir John Herschel, who was observing the southern celestial hemisphere.

She also met Charles Hay Cameron, twenty years her senior and a reformer of Indian law and education who later invested in coffee plantations in what is now Sri Lanka. He was also there to convalesce, probably after a malarial fever, which often spread during the Indian monsoon season. The illness caused kidney trouble and diarrhœa for the rest of his life.

They were married in Calcutta on 1 February 1838, two years after meeting. In December, Julia gave birth to their first child; Herschel was the godfather. Between 1839 and 1852, they had six children, one of whom was adopted. In all, the Camerons raised 11 children, five of her own, five orphaned children of relatives, and an Irish girl named Mary Ryan whom they found begging on Putney Heath and whom Cameron used as a model in her photographs. Their son, Henry Herschel Hay Cameron, would also become a photographer.

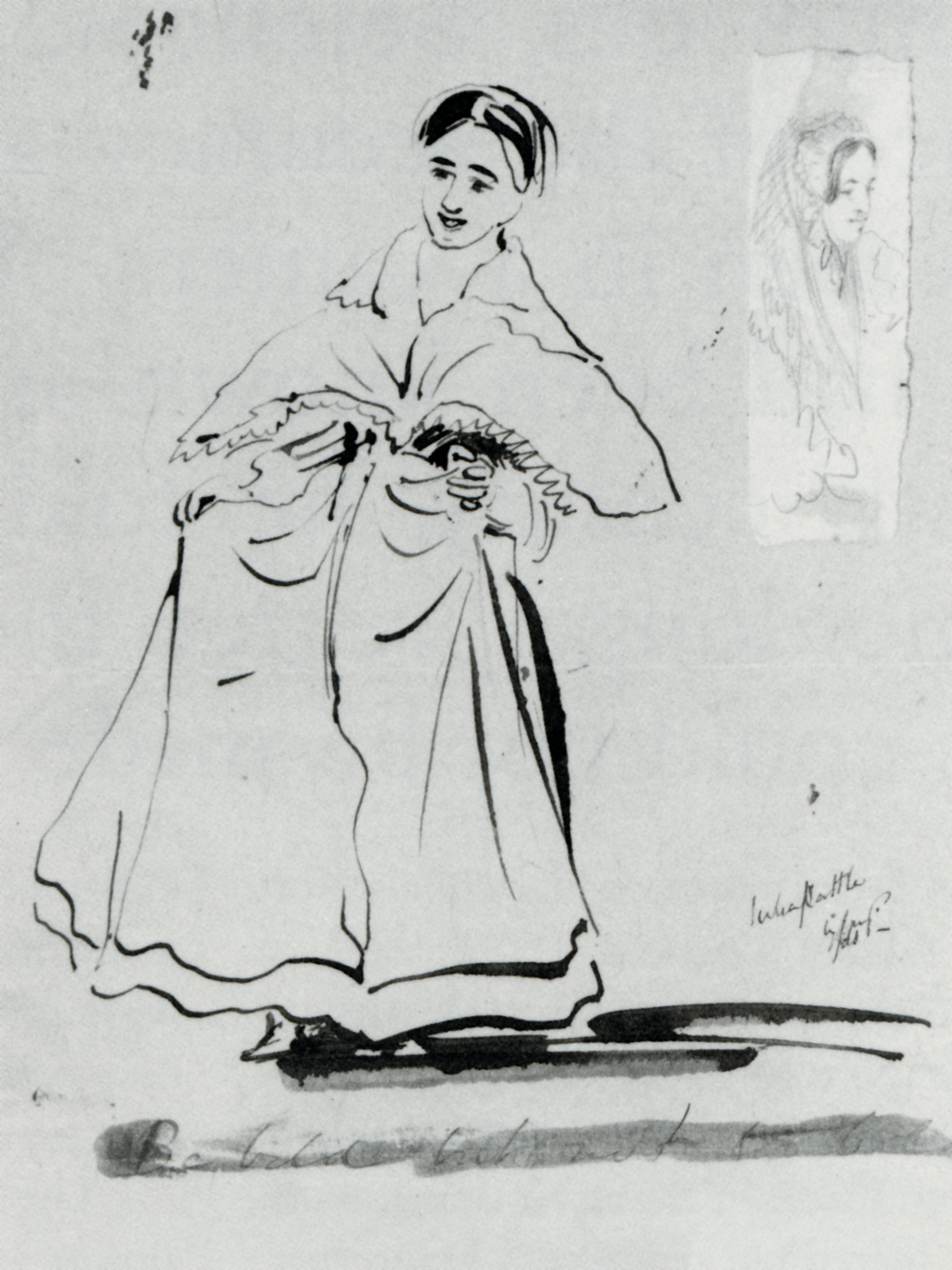
A drawing of Julia Margaret Cameron by James Prinsep

Through the early 1840s—as the organiser of social engagements for the Governor-General, Lord Hardinge—Cameron became a prominent hostess in Anglo-Indian society. During this time she also corresponded with Herschel. In 1839, he told Cameron about the invention of photography. (Note: Herschel coined the terms "photography", "snapshot", and "negative".) In 1842, he sent her two dozen calotypes and daguerreotypes, the first photographs she ever saw.

==== England ====
The Camerons moved to England in 1845, where they took part in London's artistic and cultural scene. Julia often visited Little Holland House where her sister, Sara Prinsep, oversaw a literary and artistic salon "of Pre-Raphaelite painters, poets, and aristocrats with artistic pretensions". Here, she met many of the subjects of her later portraits, including Henry Taylor and Alfred Tennyson.

Daphne du Maurier describes the scene:

The nobilitee, the gentree, the litherathure, polithics and art of the counthree, by jasus! It's a nest of proraphaelites, where Hunt, Millais, Rossetti, Watts, Leighton etc, Tennyson, the Brownings and Thackeray etc and tutti quanti receive dinners and incense, and cups of tea handed to them by these women almost kneeling.

Benjamin Jowett echoed this when describing Cameron's reverence to these artists and poets after a later visit to Freshwater. The same salon-like atmosphere was present. "She is a sort of hero-worshipper, and the hero is not Mr Tennyson – he only occupies second place – but Henry Taylor."

In 1847, she was writing poetry, had started a novel, and published a translation of Gottfried August Bürger's Leonora.

In 1848, Charles Cameron retired and invested in coffee and rubber plantations in Ceylon, becoming one of the island's largest landowners. The Camerons settled in Tunbridge Wells in Kent, where they were neighbours of Taylor, then moved to East Sheen in 1850. During this time, Cameron became a member of a society for art education and appreciation. George Frederic Watts started working on a painting of Cameron (which is now in the National Portrait Gallery).

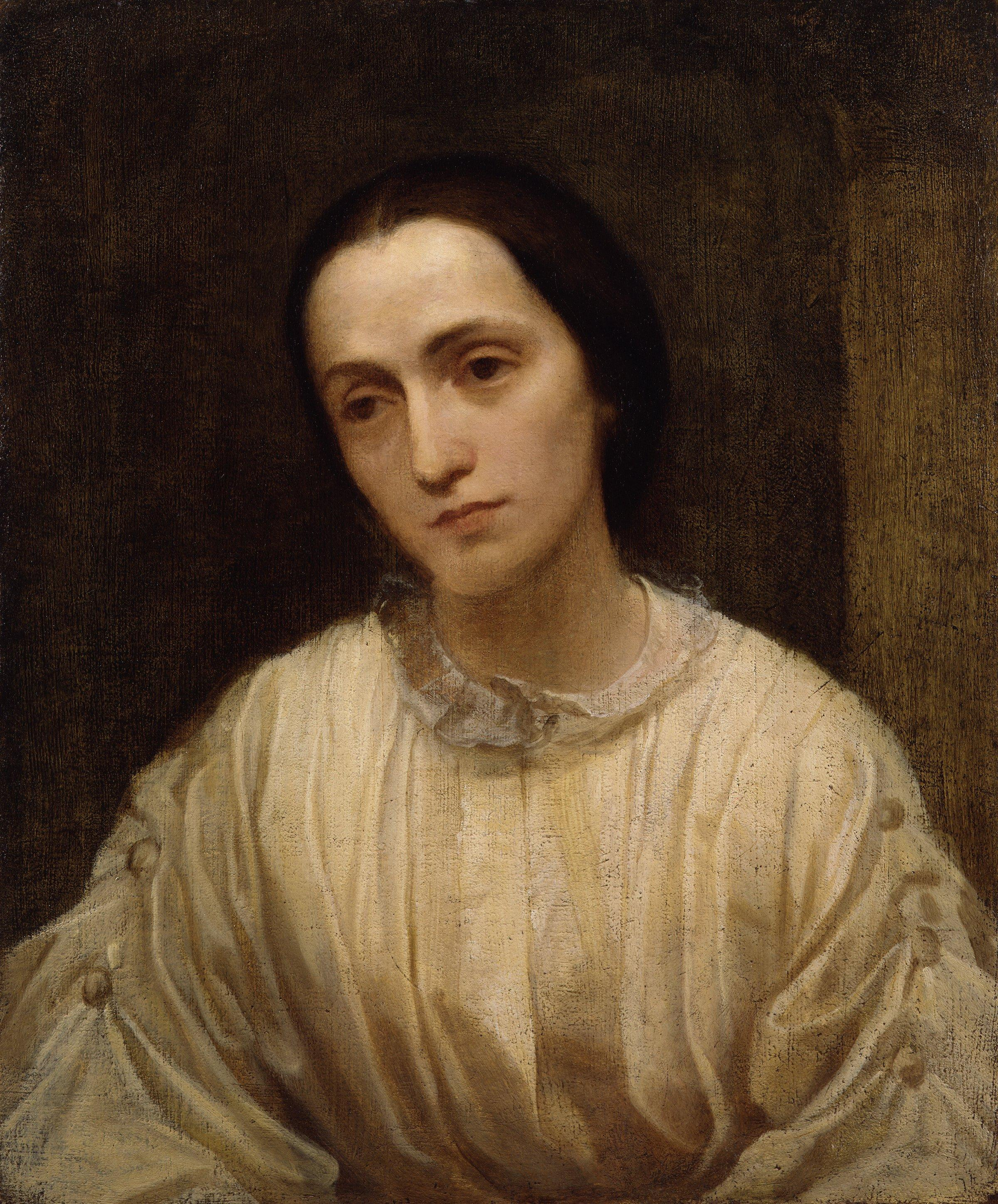
Julia Margaret Cameron by George Frederic Watts. Oil on canvas, 1850–1852, 24 in. x 20 in. (610 mm x 508 mm).

In 1860, after an extended visit to Tennyson at Freshwater, Cameron bought a house next door. The family moved there, naming the property "Dimbola" after one of the coffee plantations in Ceylon. A private gate connected the residences and the two families soon started entertaining famous people with music, poetry readings, and amateur plays, creating an artistic scene similar to Little Holland House. Cameron lived there until 1875.

=== Photography career ===
==== Early career ====
Cameron showed an interest in photography in the late 1850s and there are indications that she experimented with making photographs in the early 1860s. Around 1863, her daughter and son-in-law gave her a sliding-box camera for Christmas. The gift was meant to provide a diversion while her husband was in Ceylon. Her daughter said, "It may amuse you, Mother, to try to photograph during your solitude at Freshwater."

Cameron converted a chicken coop into studio space. Later, in an unfinished autobiography, Annals of my Glasshouse, she wrote:

I turned my coal-house into my dark room, and a glazed fowl house I had given my children became my glass house. The hens were liberated, I hope and believe not eaten. The profit of my boys upon new laid eggs was stopped, and all hands and hearts sympathised in my new labour, since the society of hens and chickens was soon changed for that of poets, prophets, painters and lovely maidens, who all in turn have immortalized the humble little farm erection. [...] I began with no knowledge of the art... I did not know where to place my dark box, how to focus my sitter, and my first picture I effaced to my consternation by rubbing my hand over the filmy side of the glass.

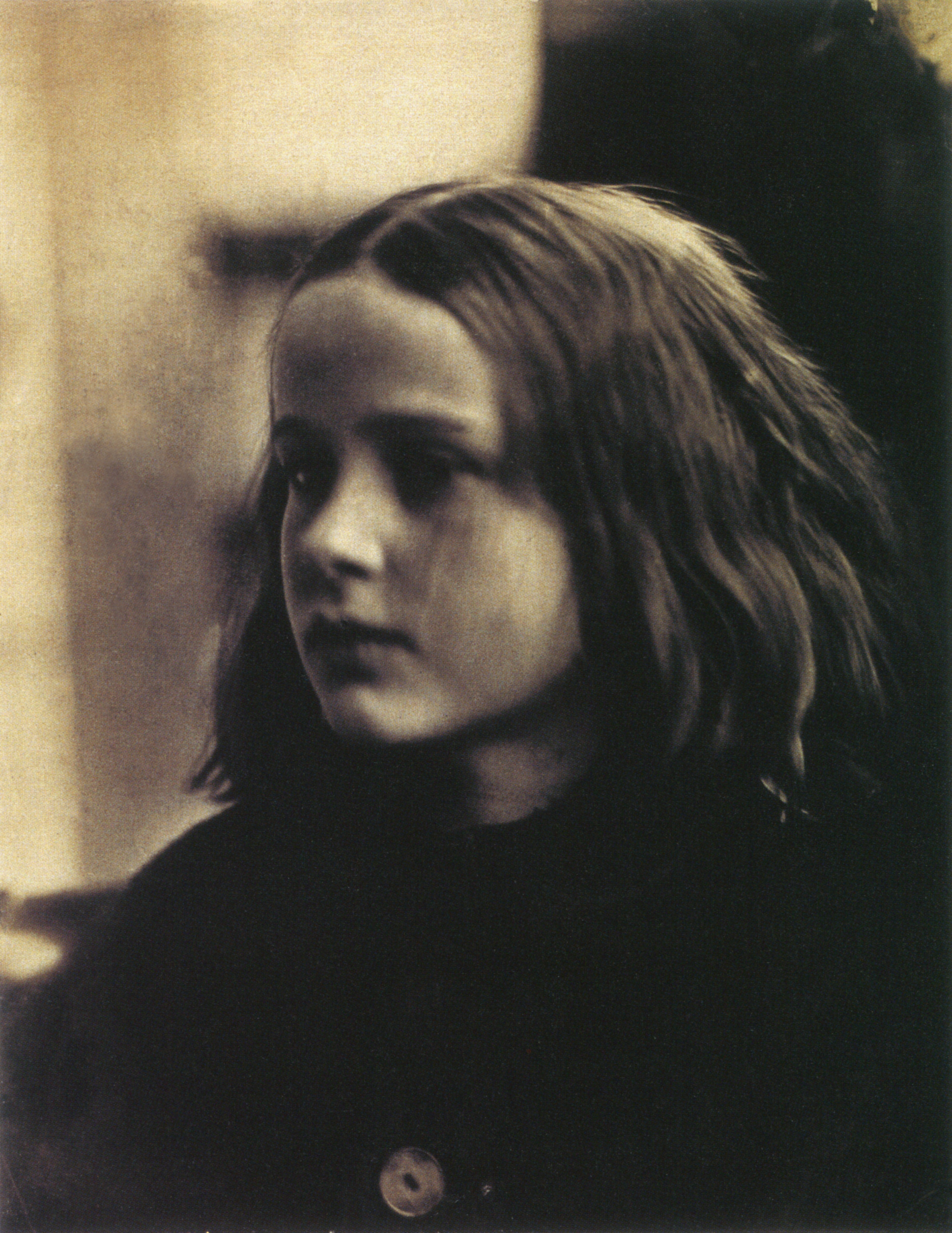
Cameron called this 29 January 1864 portrait of Annie Philpot her "first success".

On 29 January 1864 Cameron photographed nine‐year‐old Annie Philpot, an image she described as her "first success". She sent the photograph to the subject's father with the note:

My first perfect success in the complete Photograph owing greatly to the docility & sweetness of my best & fairest sitter. This Photograph was taken by me at 1 p.m. Friday Jan. 29th. Printed—Toned—fixed and framed all by me & given as it is now by 8 p.m. this same day.

That same year, she compiled albums of her images for Watts and Herschel, registered her work and prepared it for exhibition and sale. She was elected to the Photographic Society of London, displaying work at yearly exhibitions and remaining a member until her death.

Cameron took up photography as an amateur and considered herself an artist. Although never making commissioned portraits or establishing a commercial studio, she thought of her photographic activity as a professional endeavour, copyrighting, publishing, and marketing her work. The family did not see substantial profits from their coffee plantations and Cameron may have been looking to bring in some money with her photography. The portraits of celebrities and the high volume of her photographic output also suggest commercial aspirations.

==== Mid-career ====
In 1865, she became a member of the Photographic Society of Scotland and arranged to have her prints sold through the London dealers P. & D. Colnaghi. She presented a series of photographs, The Fruits of the Spirit, to the British Museum, and held her first solo exhibition in November 1865. Her prints generated robust demand and she showed her work throughout Europe, securing awards in Berlin in 1865 and 1866, and an honourable mention in Dublin.

Her photographic activity was supported by her husband. Cameron wrote: "My husband from first to last has watched every picture with delight, and it is my daily habit to run to him with every glass upon which a fresh glory is newly stamped, and to listen to his enthusiastic applause."

In August 1865, the South Kensington Museum (now the Victoria and Albert Museum), purchased 80 of her photographs. Three years later, it offered her two rooms to use as a portrait studio, making her the museum's first artist-in-residence.

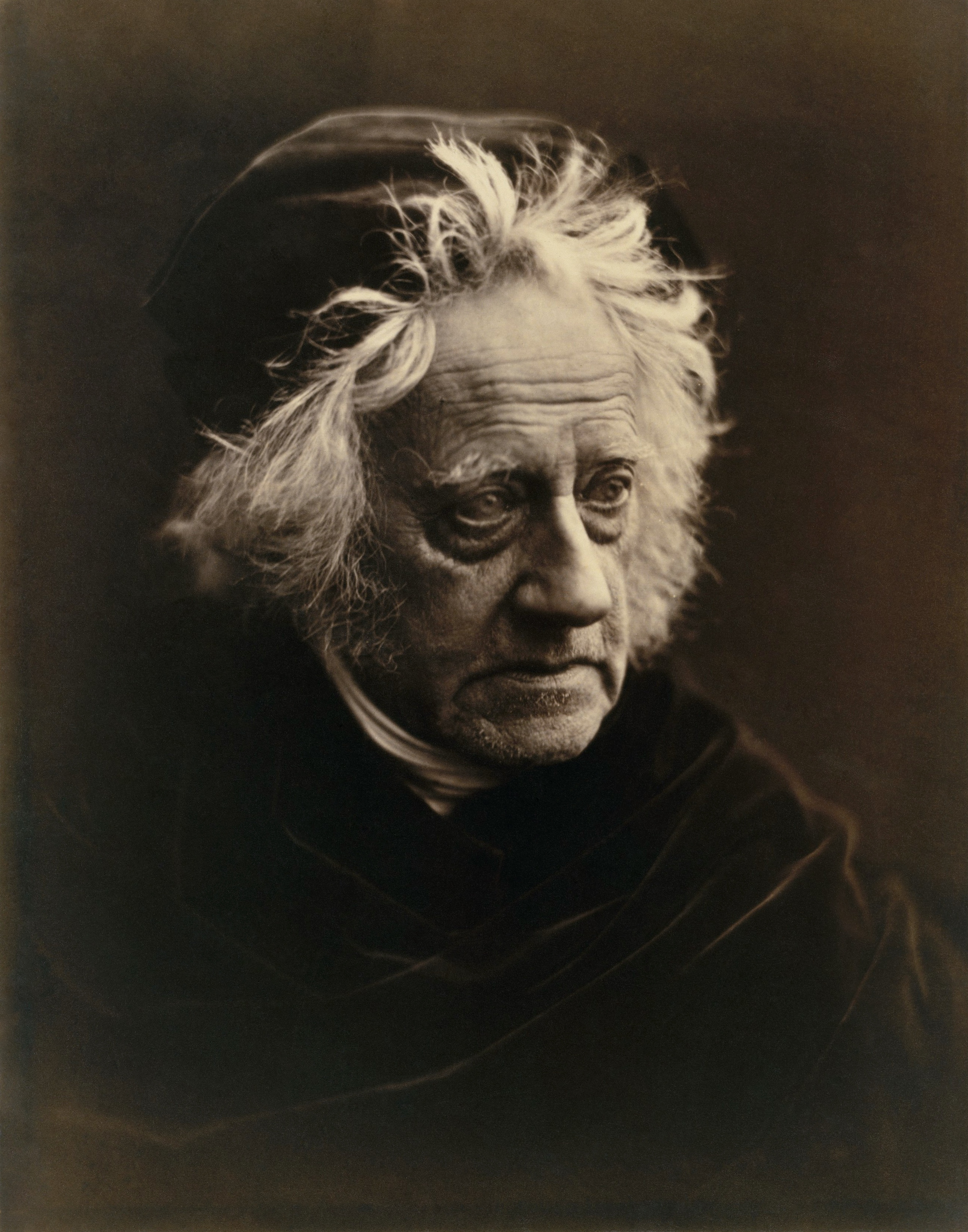
Sir John Herschel, 1867

She produced images of Thomas Carlyle and John Herschel in 1867. By 1868, she was generating sales through P. & D. Colnaghi and a second London agent, William Spooner. In 1869, she created The Kiss of Peace, which she considered her finest work.

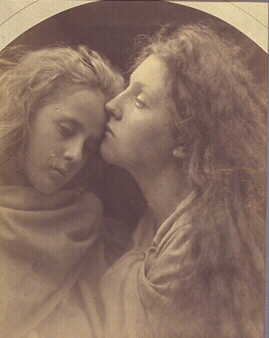
The Kiss of Peace, by Julia Margaret Cameron

In the early 1870s, Cameron's work matured. Her elaborate illustrative tableaux involving religious, literary, and classical figures peaked in a series of images for Tennyson's Idylls of the King, published in 1874 and 1875, evidently at her expense. During this time, she also wrote Annals of my Glass House.

=== Later life ===
In October 1873, her daughter died in childbirth. Two years later, because of her husband's ill-health, the lower cost of living, and to be near to their sons who were managing the family coffee plantations, Cameron and her husband left Freshwater for Ceylon with "a cow, Cameron's photographic equipment, and two coffins, in case such items should not be available in the East".

Henry Taylor recounts the departure:

Mr. and Mrs. Cameron have taken their departure for Ceylon, there to live and die. He had bought an estate there some thirty years ago when he was serving the Crown there and elsewhere in the East, and he had a passionate love for the island, to which he had rendered an important service in providing it with a code of procedure ... he never ceased to yearn after the island as his place of abode, and thither in his eighty-first year he has betaken himself, with a strange joy. The design was kept secret, – I believe even from their dearest relatives.

V.C. Scott O'Connor later wrote about their empty home in Freshwater:

The house is silent now and tenantless. All its old feverish life and bustle are stilled as is the heart which beat here in true sympathy with every living creature that came within its reach needing such succor. Her pretty maids, her scholars, her poets, her philosophers, astronomers, and divines, all those men of genius who came and sat willingly to her while in a fever of artistic emotion she plied the instruments of her art, – they have all gone, and silence is the only tenant left at Dimbola.

The move marked the end of Cameron's photography career; she took few photographs afterwards, mostly of Tamil servants and workers. (Note: Cameron described these subjects as "natives", much as she referred to the residents of the Isle of Wight as "peasants".) Fewer than 30 images survive from this period. Cameron's output may have dropped in part because of the difficulty working with collodion in the heat and a lack of fresh water for washing prints. The botanical painter and biologist Marianne North recounted a visit to Cameron in Ceylon:

The walls of the room were covered with magnificent photographs; others were tumbling about the tables, chairs, and floors with quantities of damp books, all untidy and picturesque; the lady herself with a lace veil on her head and flowing draperies. Her oddities were most refreshing . . . She also made some studies of natives while I was there, and took such a fancy to the back of one of them (which she said was absolutely superb) that she insisted on her son retaining him as her gardener, though she had no garden and he did not know even the meaning of the word.

In 1875, after a short visit to England, Cameron fell ill with a dangerous chill.

In February 1876, Macmillan's Magazine published her poem, On a Portrait. The following year, her image The Parting of Sir Lancelot and Queen Guinevere appeared on the cover Harper's Weekly as a wood engraving.

Cameron died on 26 January 1879 at the Glencairn estate in Ceylon. It is often reported that her last word was "Beauty" or "Beautiful".

In her 12-year career, Cameron produced about 900 photographs.

== Photographic work ==
=== Influences ===
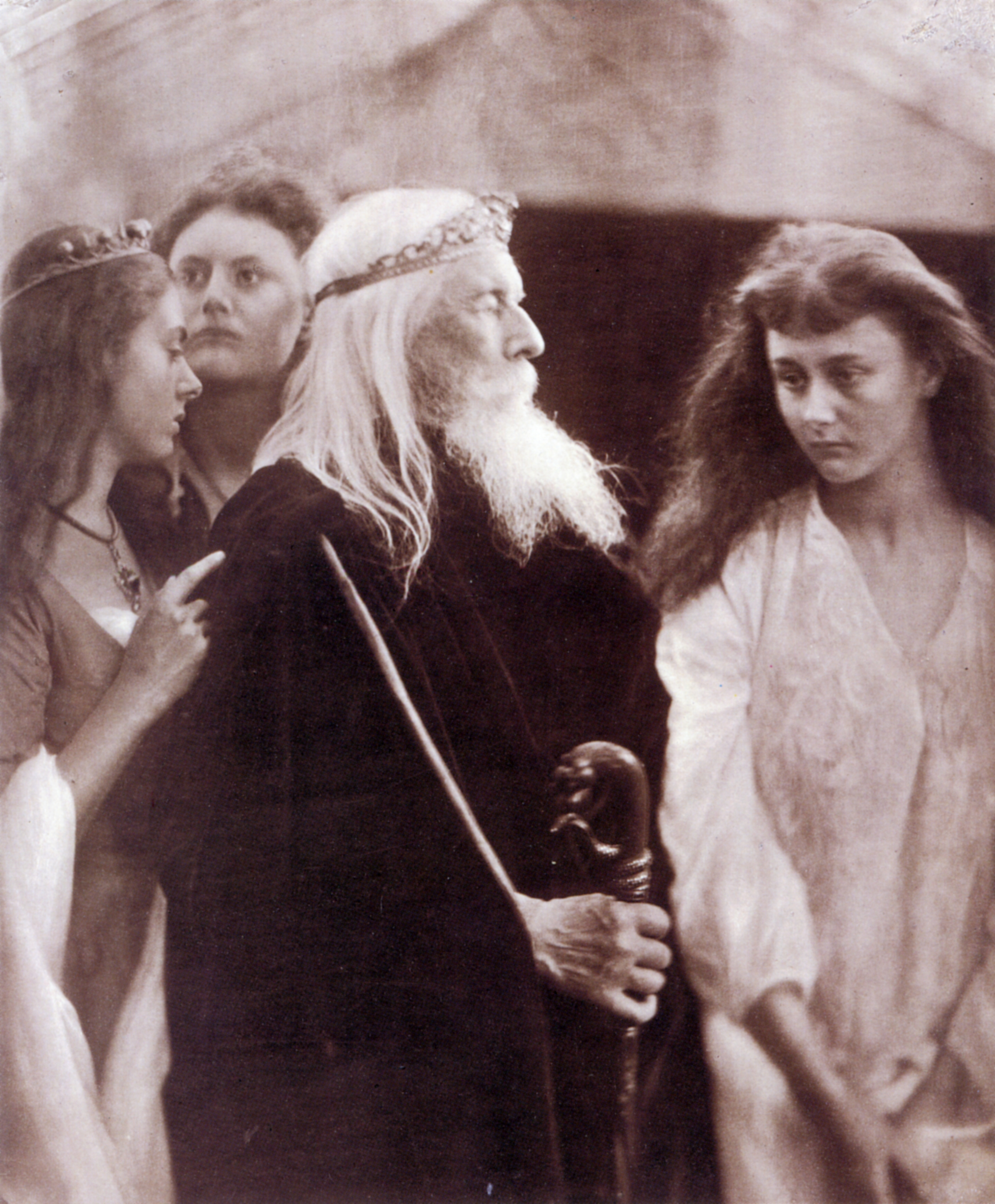
King Lear allotting his Kingdom to his three daughters. Sitters are Lorina Liddell, Edith Liddell, Charles Hay Cameron and Alice Liddell.

Cameron was an educated and cultured woman; she was a Christian thinker familiar with medieval art, the Renaissance, and the Pre-Raphaelites. (Note: Of the Pre-Raphaelites, "she was closest in her artistic ideals and the ethos of her work to G. F. Watts".) She may also have been influenced by the contemporary interest in phrenology, the study of the skull as a sign of a person's character. The Old Masters also informed her work. Her compositions and use of light have been connected to Raphael, Rembrandt, and Titian.

John Herschel, who relayed to Cameron the news of the inventions of photography by Talbot and Daguerre, was an important influence on technique and the practicalities of the medium, as indicated in a letter Cameron wrote to the astronomer, "You were my first teacher and to you I owe all the first experience and insights."

It is likely that Cameron saw Reginald Southey photographing on the Isle of Wight during a holiday in 1857 when he visited the Camerons and photographed their children and the children of her neighbours, the Tennysons, before Cameron took up the camera in earnest.

Perhaps the most important photographer to influence Cameron's work was David Wilkie Wynfield. Much like Cameron, Wynfield published soft-focus portraits of friends dressed up as characters from history or literature. The press compared their photographic work and noted the similarities in style and their consideration of the medium as fine art. Cameron's style of close-up portraits resembling Titian may well have been learned from Wynfield, since she took a lesson from him and later wrote "I consult him in correspondence whenever I am in difficulty". The Arts Council booklet to accompany the 1951 Festival of Britain photography exhibition quoted from an 11-page "holograph letter" (exhibit 471) to William Michael Rossetti in which she states: "To [Wynfield's] beautiful photography I owed all my attempts and indeed consequently all my success."

==== Concept of genius and beauty ====
Cameron's portraits are partly the product of her intimacy and regard for the subject, but also intend to capture "particular qualities or essences—typically, genius in men and beauty in women". Mike Weaver, a scholar who wrote about Cameron's photography in work published in 1984, framed her idea of genius and beauty "within a specifically Christian framework, as indicative of the sublime and the sacred". Weaver supposes that Cameron's myriad influences informed her concept of beauty: "the Bible, classical mythology, Shakespeare's plays, and Tennyson's poems were fused into a single vision of ideal beauty."

Cameron herself indicated her desire to capture beauty. She wrote, "I longed to arrest all the beauty that came before me and at length the longing has been satisfied" and "My aspirations are to ennoble Photography and to secure for it the character and uses of High Art by combining the real & Ideal & sacrificing nothing of Truth by all possible devotion to poetry and beauty."

Her female subjects were typically chosen for their beauty, particularly the "long-necked, long-haired, immature beauty familiar in Pre-Raphaelite paintings". In Virginia Woolf's farcical play Freshwater, which described the cultural scene at Freshwater, Cameron's character comically expresses her commitment to beauty:

I have sought the beautiful in the most unlikely places. I have searched the police force at Freshwater, and not a man have I found with calves worthy of Sir Galahad. But, as I said to the Chief Constable, "Without beauty, constable, what is order? Without life, what is law?" Why should I continue to have my silver protected by a race of men whose legs are aesthetically abhorrent to me? If a burgler came and he were beautiful, I should say to him: Take my fish knives! Take my cruets, my bread baskets and my soup tureens. What you take is nothing to what you give, your calves, your beautiful calves.

=== Portraits ===
Cameron's photographs are generally placed into three categories: distinguished portraits of men, delicate portraits of women, and illustrative allegories based on religious and literary works.

==== Men ====
Cameron's portraits of men were a kind of hero-worship. To Thomas Carlyle, Cameron wrote "When I have had such men before my camera my whole soul has endeavoured to do its duty towards them in recording faithfully the greatness of the inner as well as the features of the outer man. The photograph thus taken has been almost the embodiment of a prayer."

Most of these men are well-known scientists, writers, or clergymen. Cameron turned to Old Master paintings and the contemporary idea —based in phrenology— of the ideal "type" to capture the greatness that she perceived in these eminent Victorian individuals. Her aspiration to record this greatness resulted in powerful images displaying a masterly command of chiaroscuro that resulted in "the finest and most revealing gallery of eminent Victorians in existence".

Janet Malcom notes the attention Cameron paid to facial hair as an expressive element in her portraits, writing that "Her close-ups of Tennyson, Carlyle, Darwin, Longfellow, Taylor, Watts, and Charles Cameron are as much celebrations of beards as of Victorian eminence."

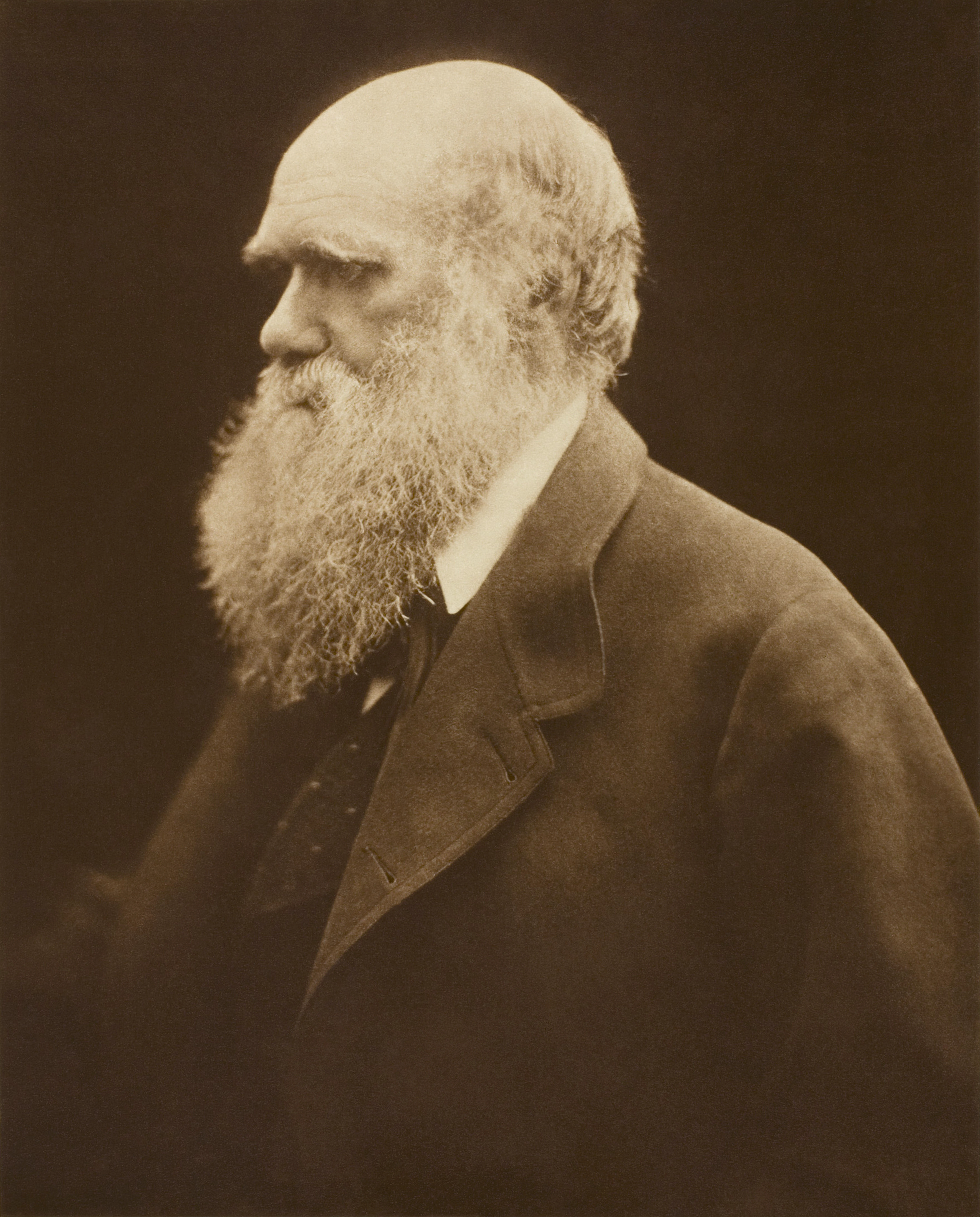
Charles Darwin, c. 1868

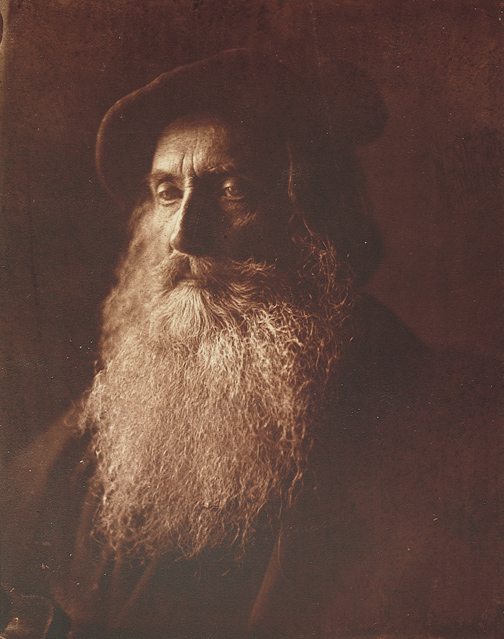
Henry Taylor, 1865

Alfred, Lord Tennyson; Carbon print, 1869

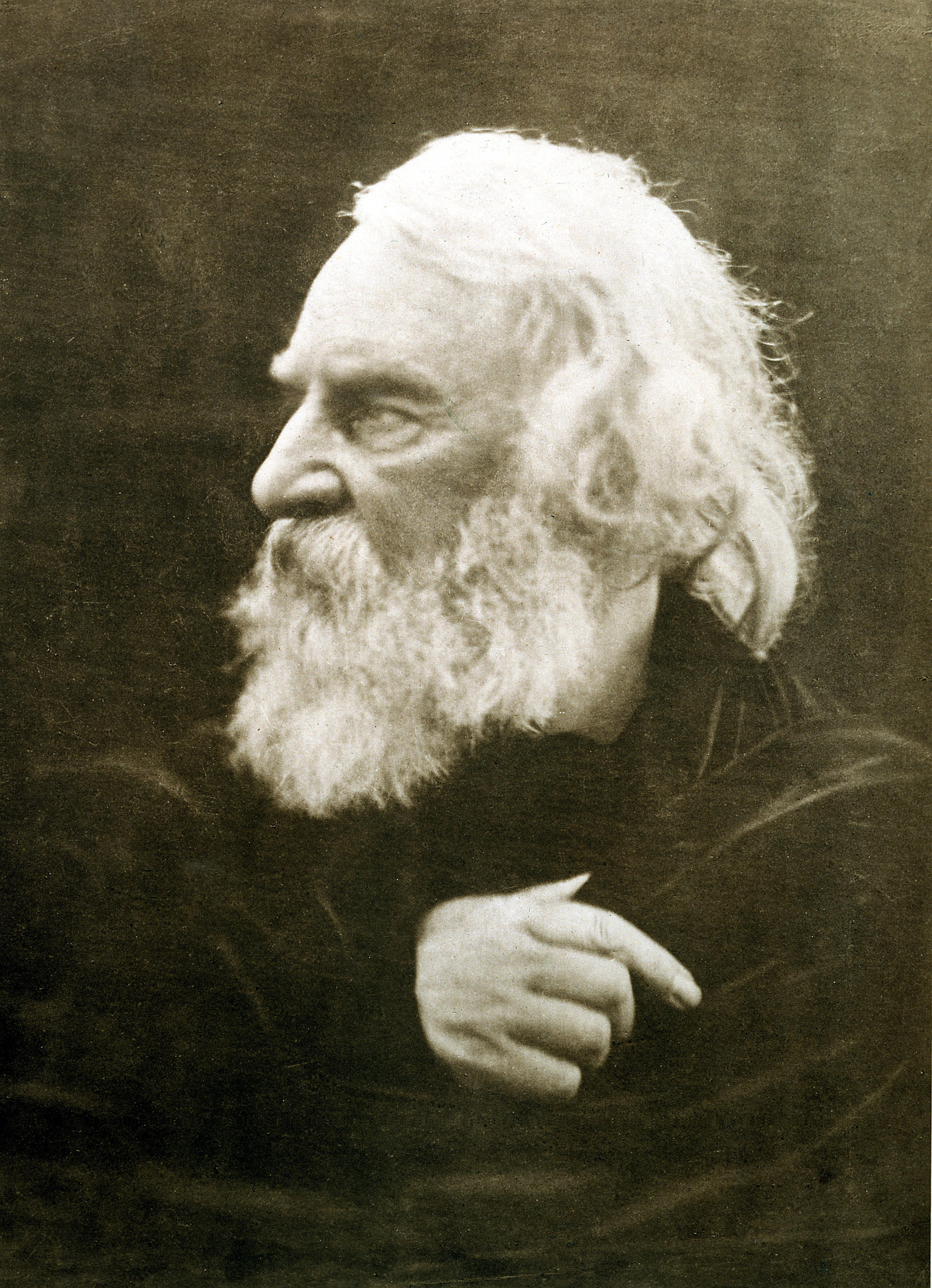
Henry Wadsworth Longfellow, 1868

==== Women ====
Her images of women are decidedly softer than those of men. With less dramatic lighting and a more typical distance between the sitter and the camera, these images are less dynamic and more conventional.

Cameron almost exclusively photographed younger women, never making a portrait even of her neighbour and good friend Emily Tennyson. According to a biographer of Darwin, Cameron refused to take a picture of the biologist's wife, saying that "no woman must be photographed between the ages of eighteen and seventy".

Her mature photographs of women are noted for their subtle but suggestive representation of the obscurity and malleability of female identity. Many of her images of young women obscure their individuality and represent their identity as multifaceted and changeable by showing them "in pairs, or reflected in a mirror... frequently expressive of a deep ambiguity and anxiety."

Janet Malcolm again notes Cameron's attention to the hair of her subjects, writing that "Like the little girls whose hair was mussed to rid it of its prim nursery look, the bigger girls were made to undo their buns and chignons so that their hair would poetically stream or flow or twist around their faces".

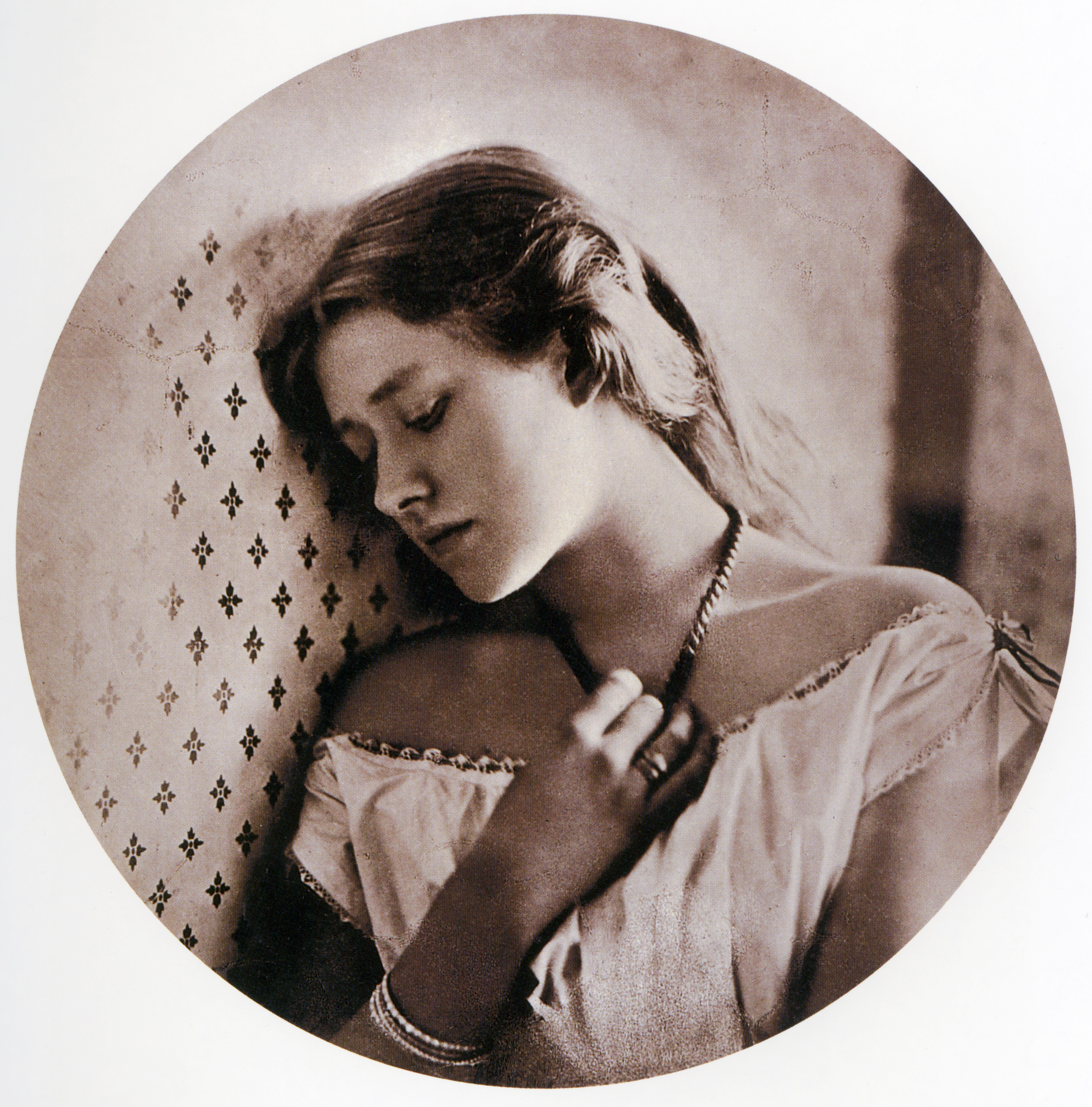
Ellen Terry, 1864

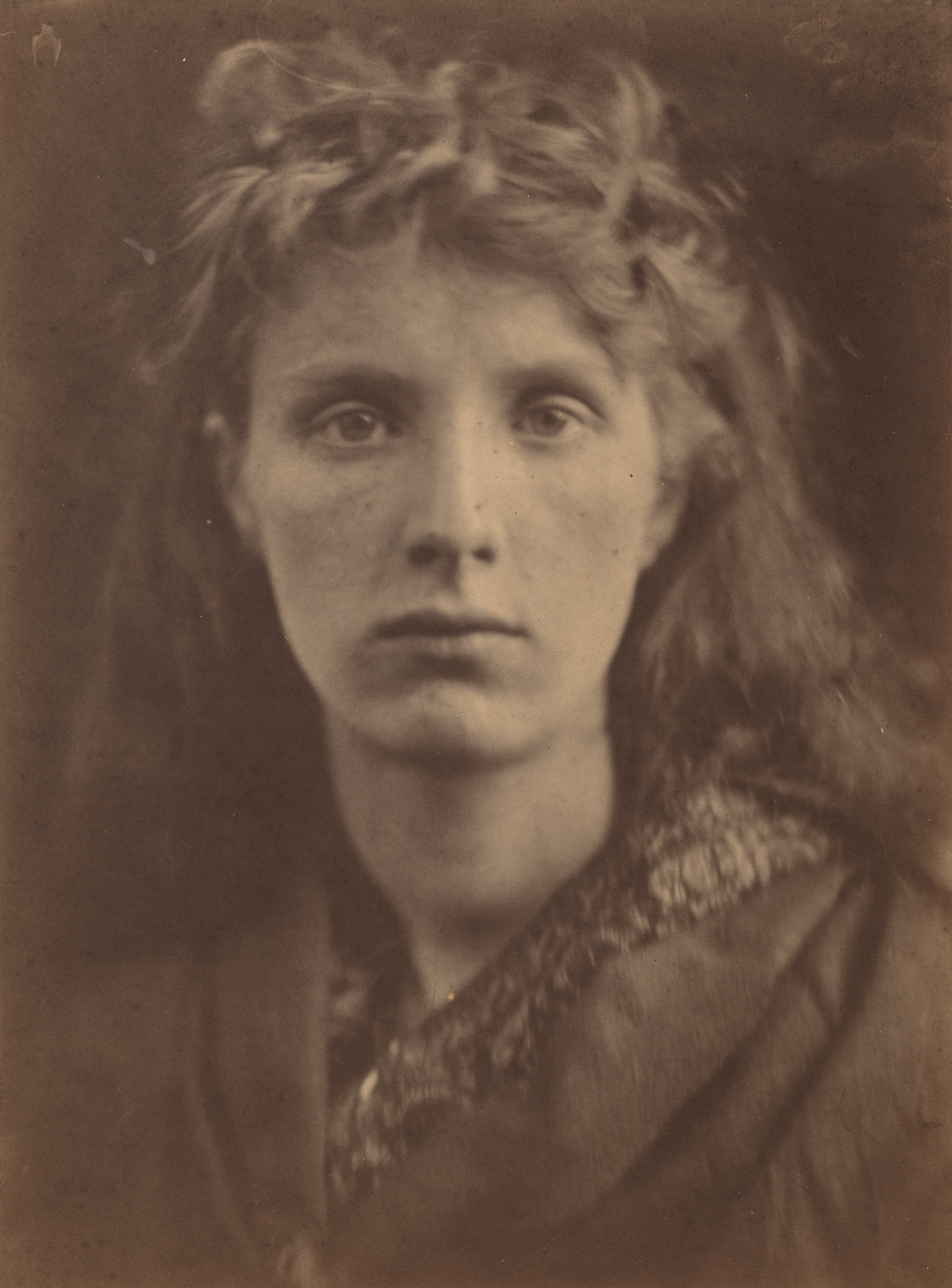
The Mountain Nymph, Sweet Liberty, 1866

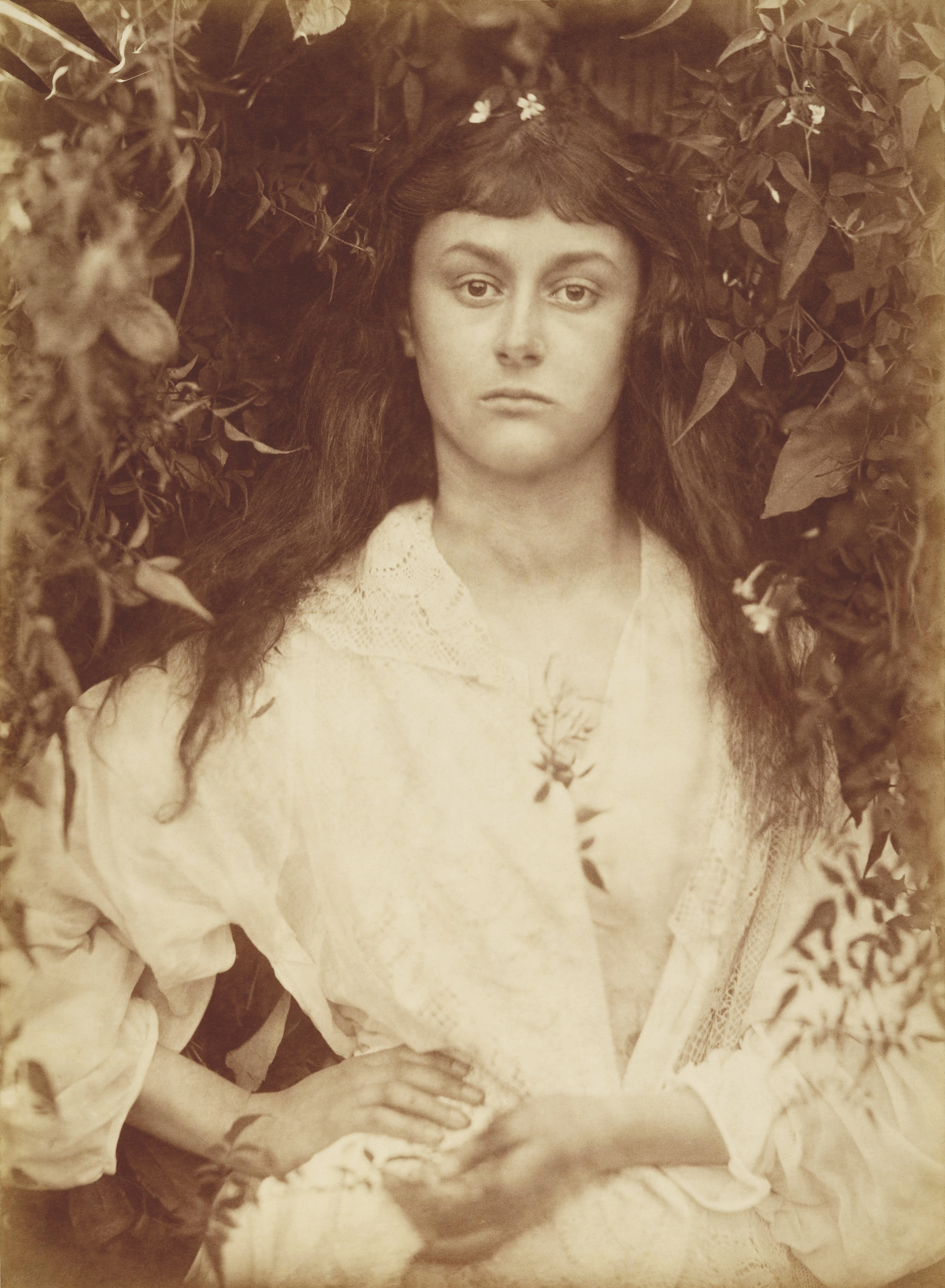
Alice Liddell, 1872

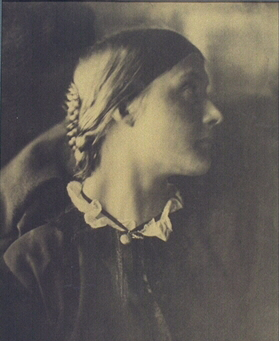
Julia Jackson, 1867

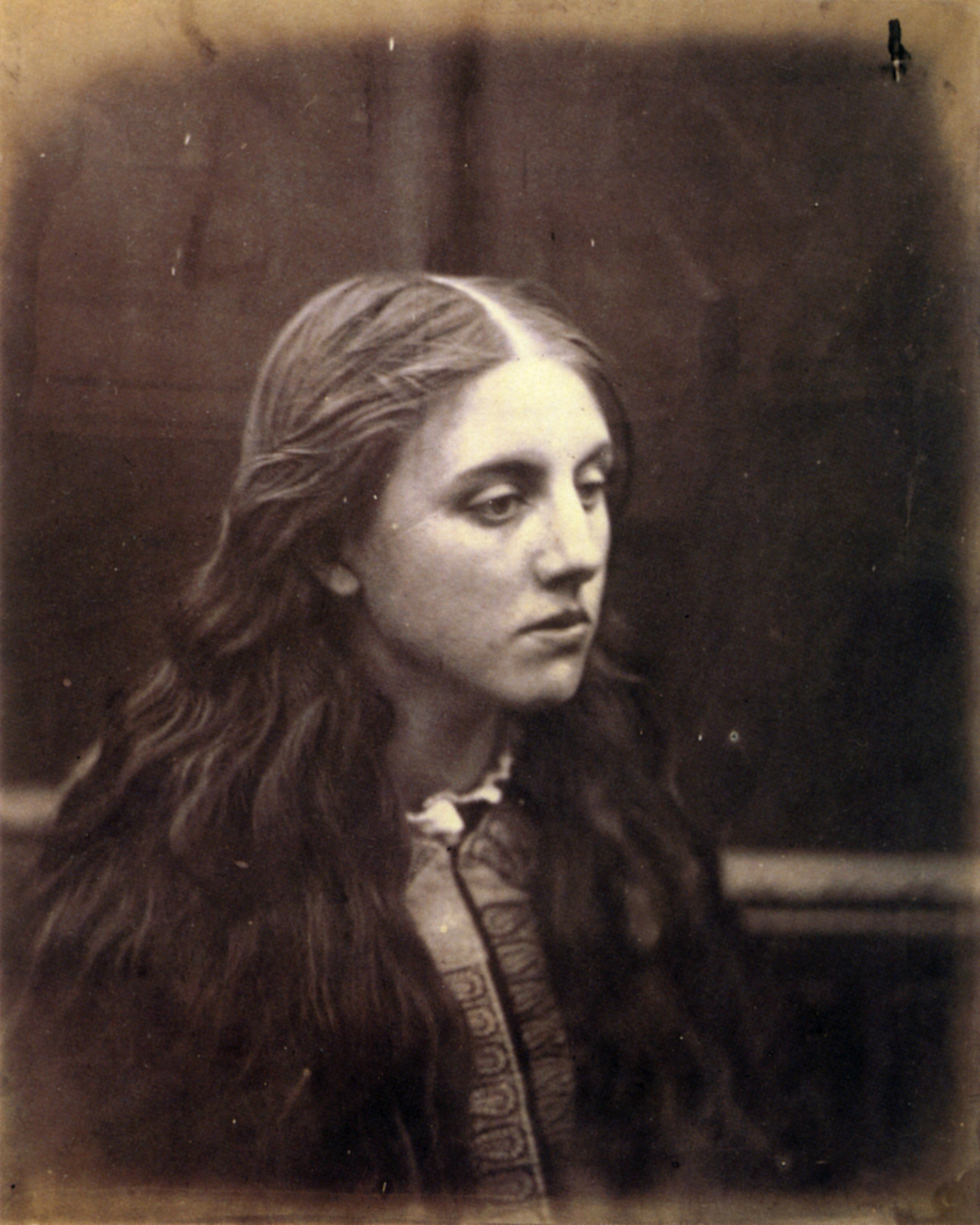
Suspense, 1864

==== Children ====
Children – her own children, those of relatives, and young locals – were often models for Cameron. Children were popular subjects in the Victorian era and Cameron kept with the prevailing notion of them as innocent, kind, and noble. She regularly depicted them as angels or as children from Bible stories.

The children in her images were not always cooperative, and her attempts to cast them as allegorical figures were often frustrated by the child's boredom, indignation, or distraction – moods which are often seen in her images.

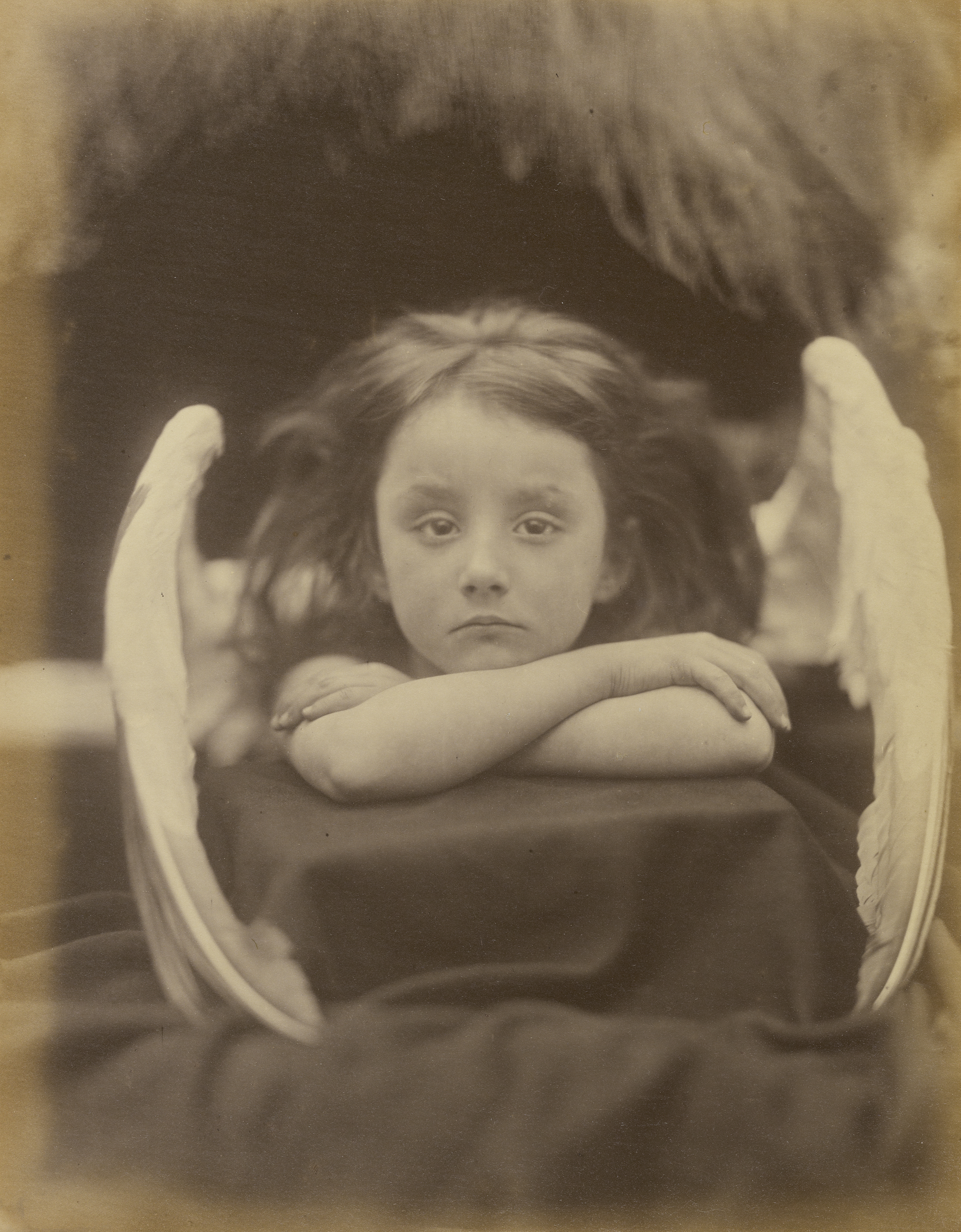
I Wait

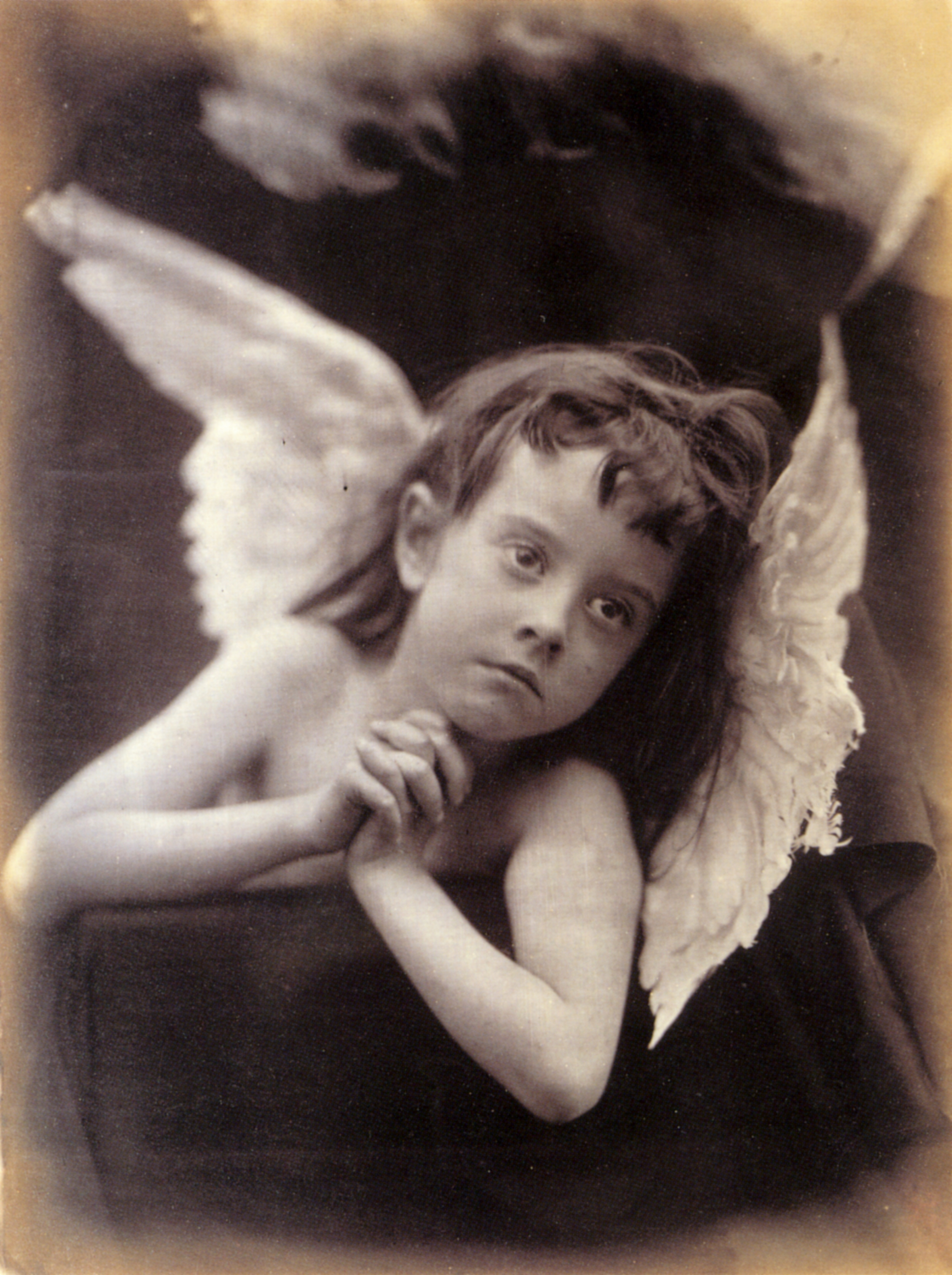
Angel of the Nativity

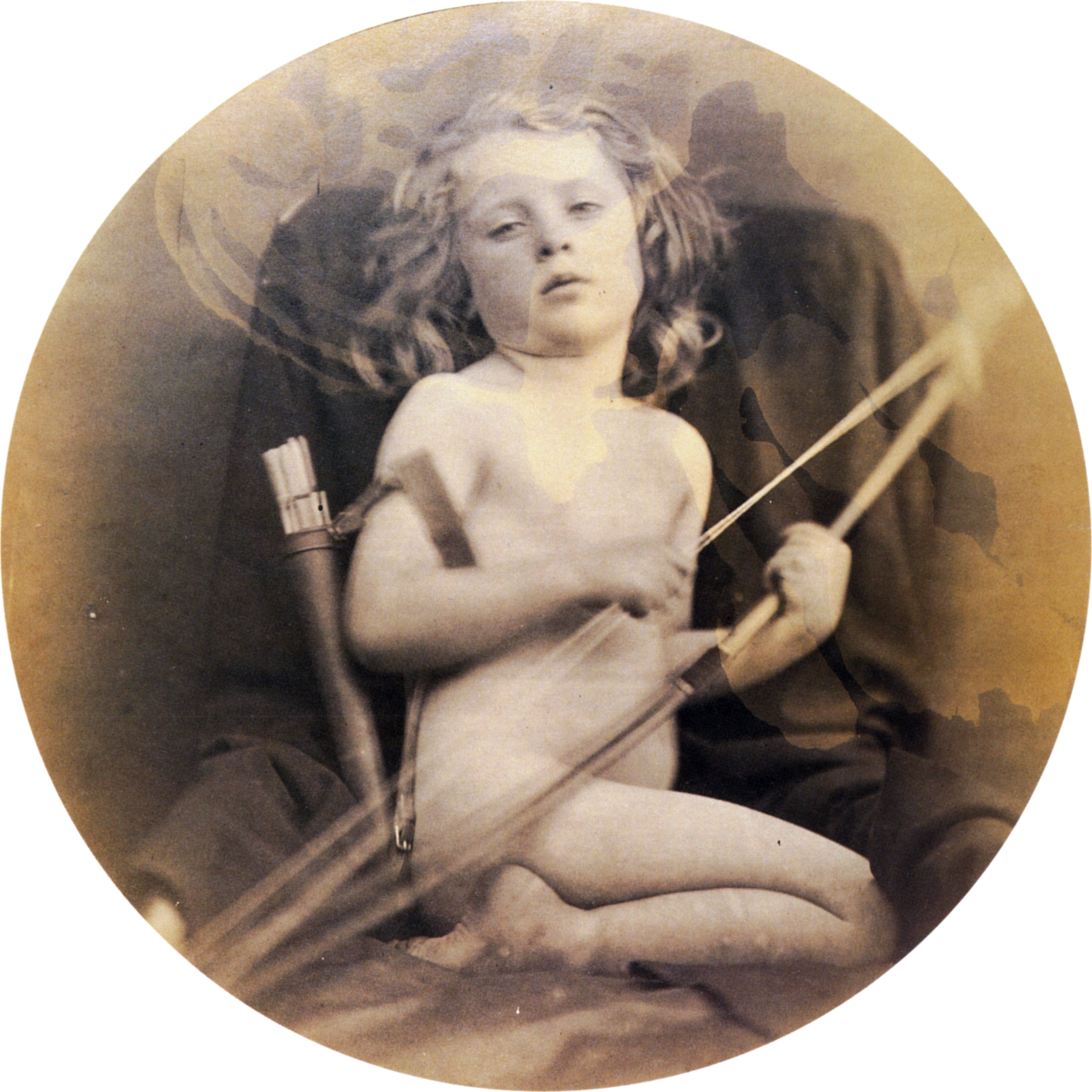
Love in Idleness

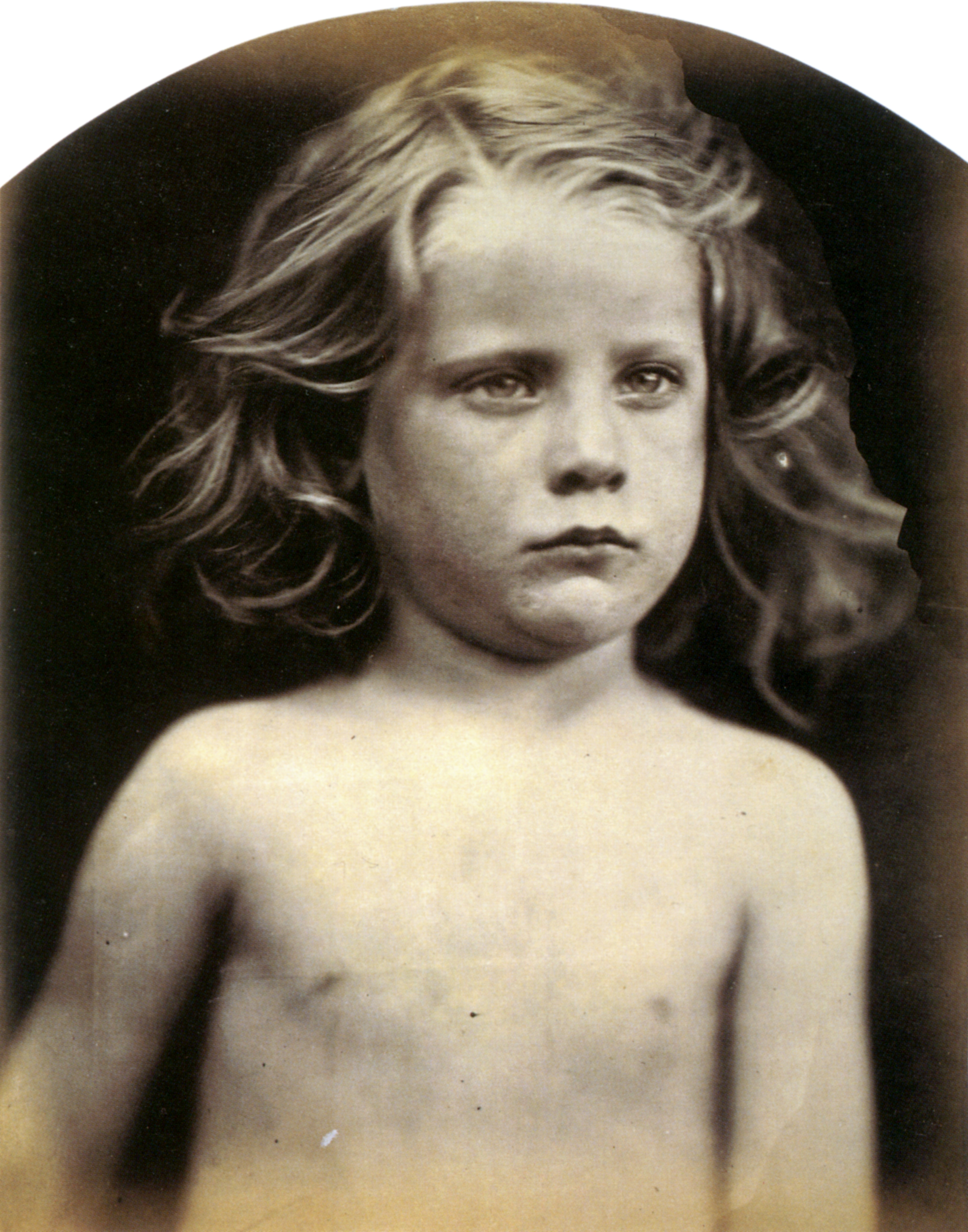
Young Astyanax

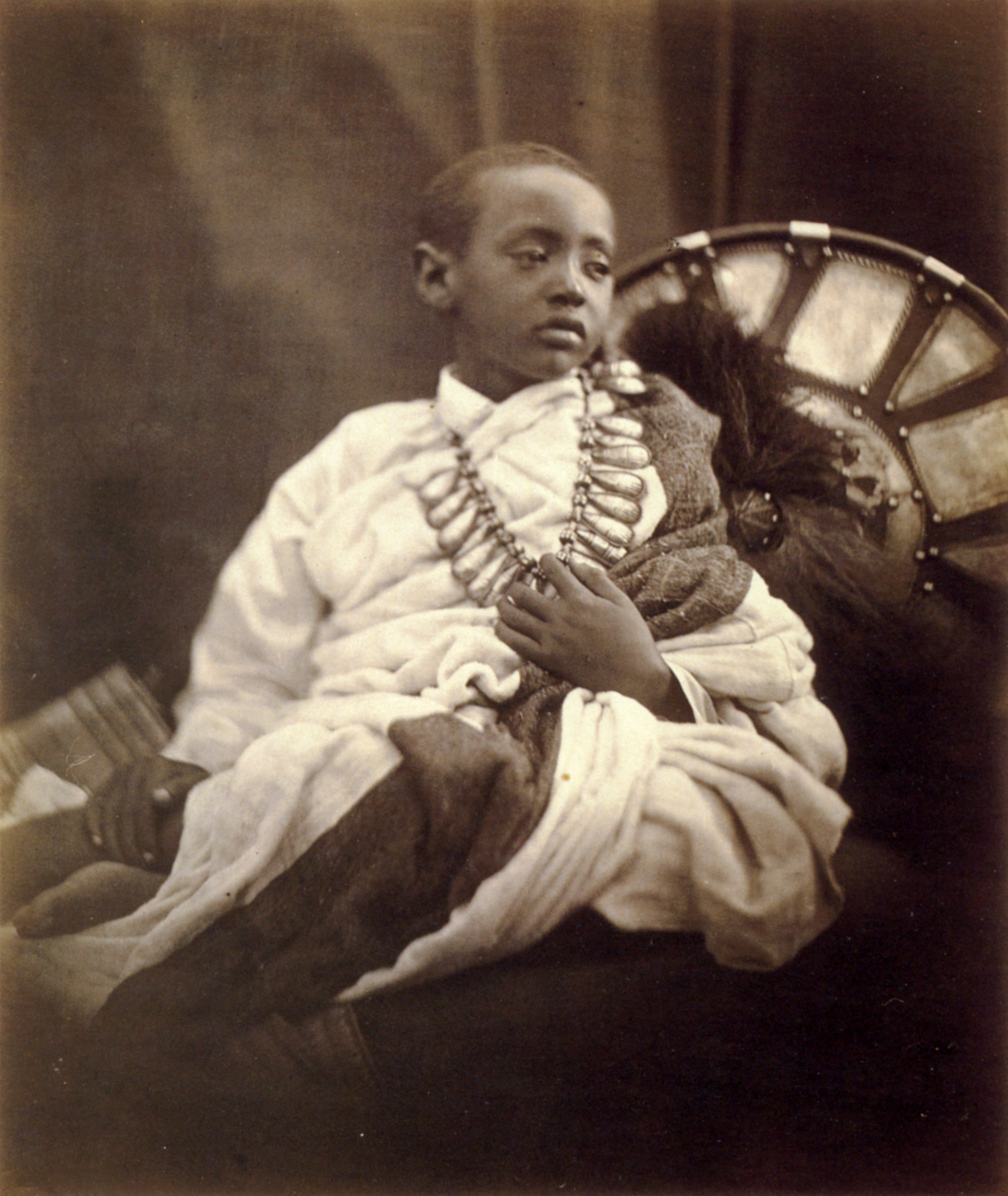
Déjatch Alámayou, King Theodore's Son

=== Allegories and illustrations ===
Cameron may have found these illustrative group portraits more challenging than her other images. With more people in the image, the chances were greater that someone would move during the long exposures, so more light was needed to shorten the exposure time and arrest the motion. More sitters also meant a greater depth of field was necessary to put everyone in focus, further complicating the compositions.

Cameron's narrative portraits of women were influenced by tableaux vivants and amateur theatre. The women in her images are typically depicted in the idealised Victorian roles of mother and wife.

==== Religion ====
Cameron made over 50 images representing the Madonna, often played by her household servant Mary Hillier. These images present "an ideal of femininity that combines wholesomeness with qualities of sensuality and vulnerability". She represented the Virgin Mary in various scenes from the Bible, such as the Annunciation and the Salutation, but also illustrated more obscure figures.

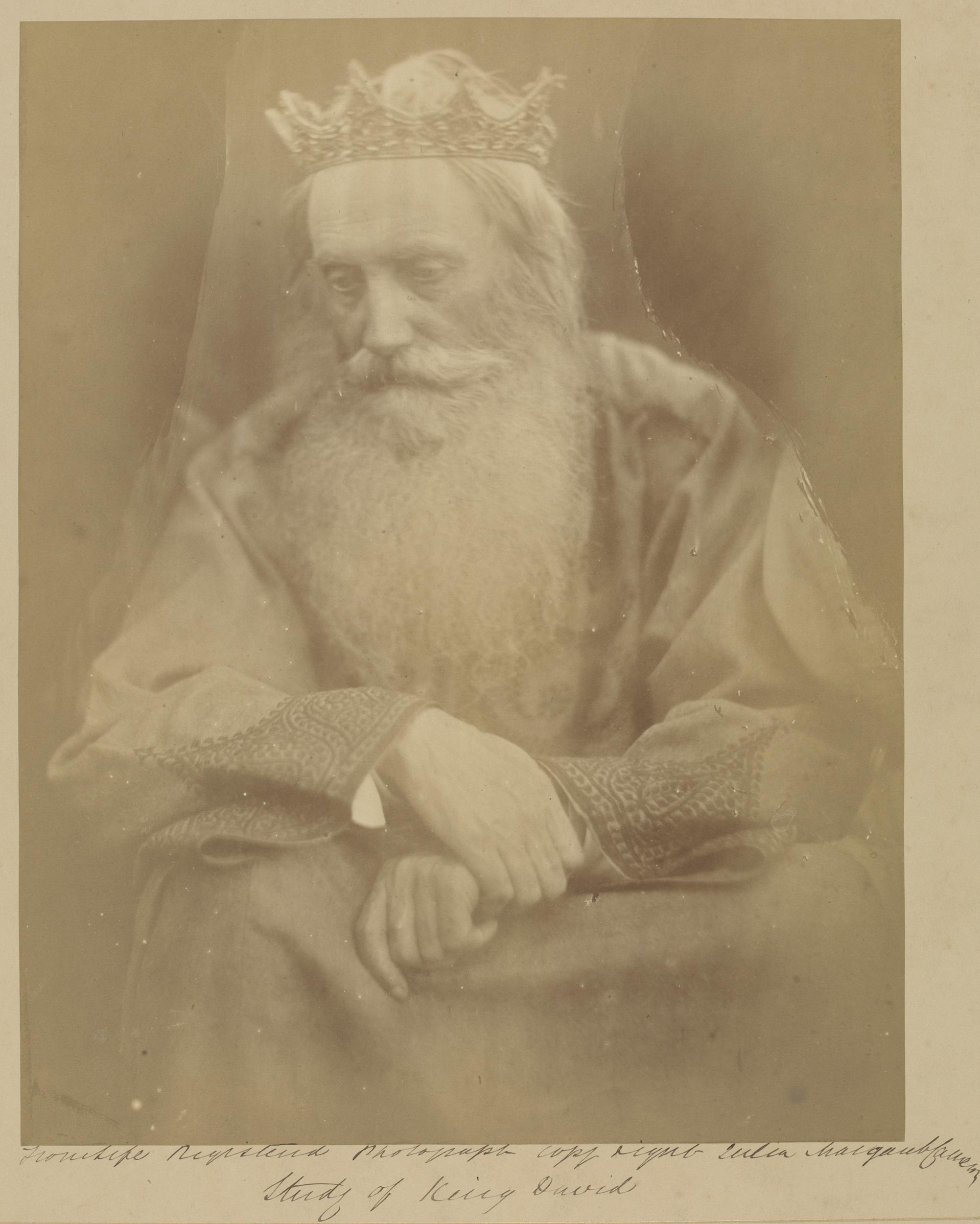
Sir Henry Taylor as King David, 1866

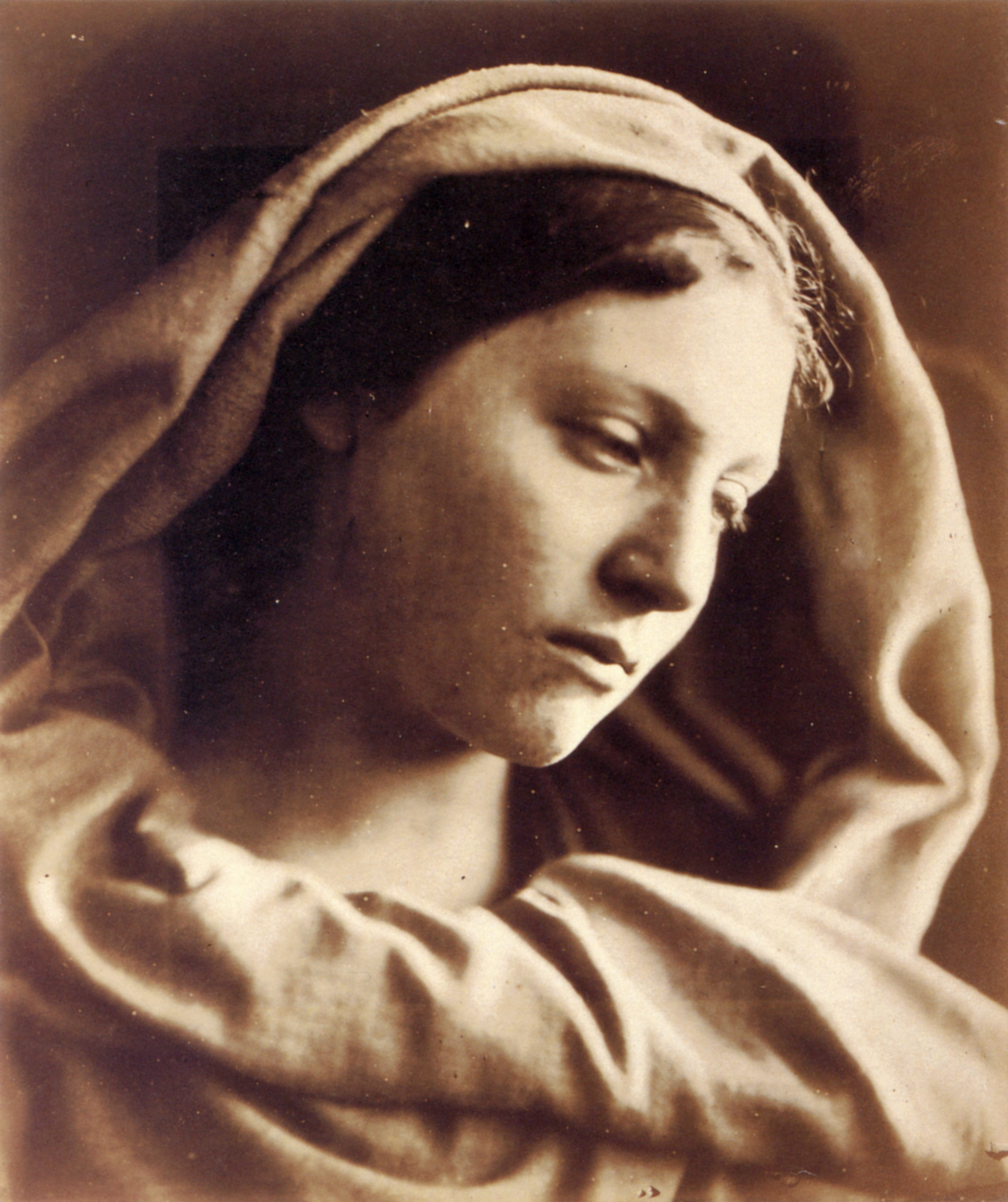
Mary Mother

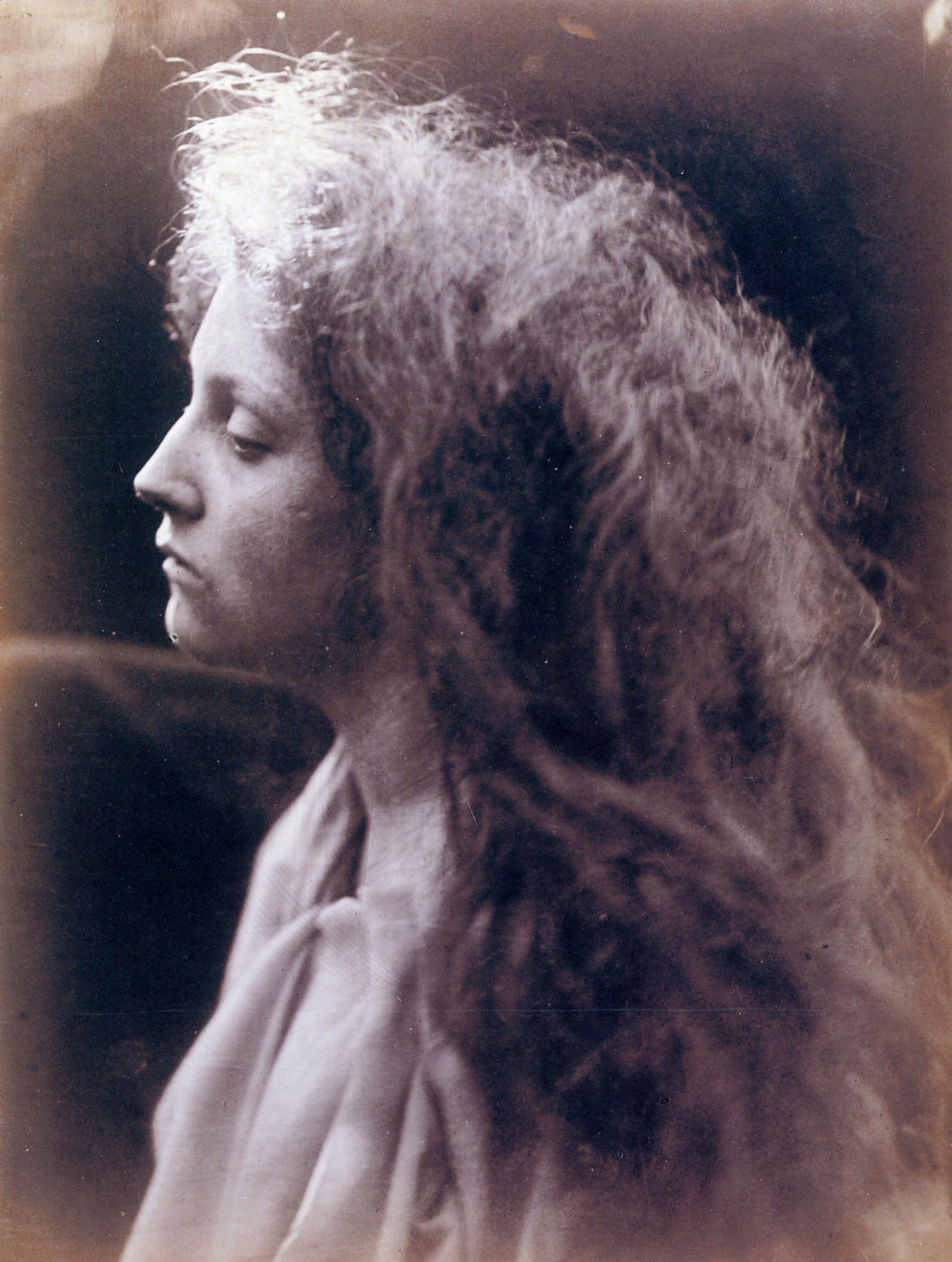
The Angel at the Tomb

==== Literature ====
Cameron took literature as inspiration, representing characters from Shakespeare, Elizabethan poems, novels, plays, and the work of her contemporaries: Tennyson, Henry Taylor, Christina Rossetti, Robert Browning, and George Eliot.

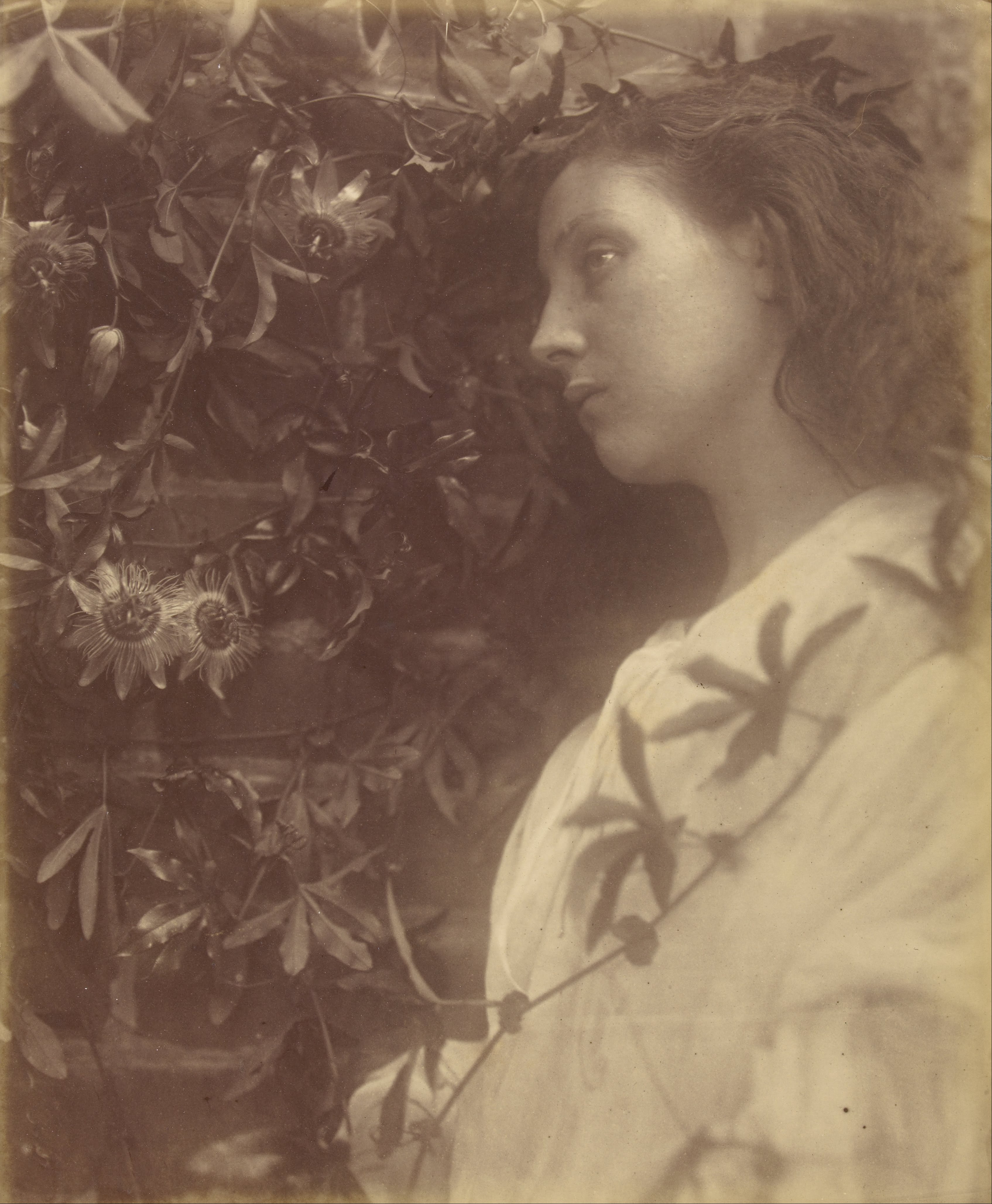
Maud "There has Fallen a splendid Tear From the Passion Flower at the Gate", 1875

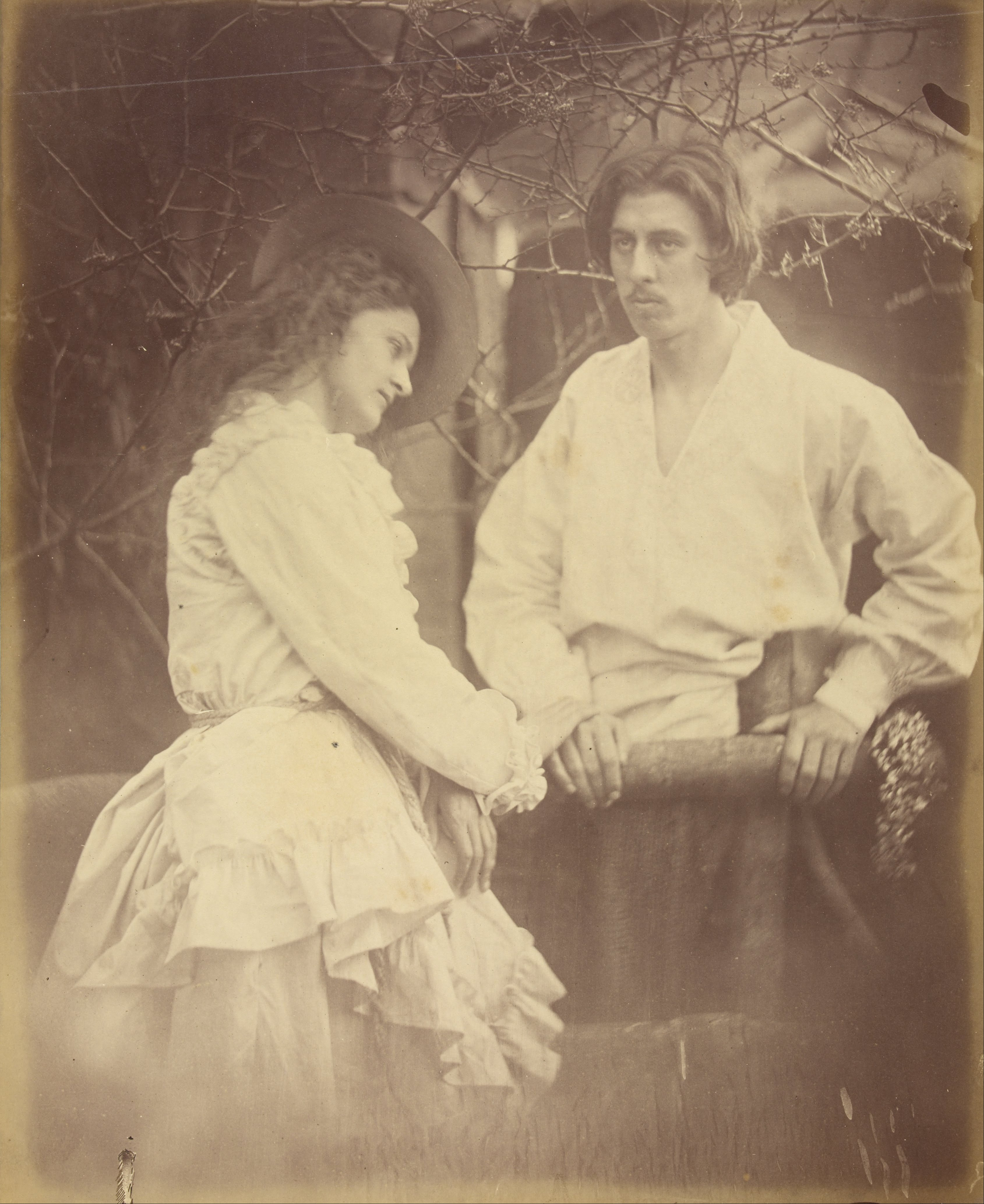
"He thought of that sharp look Mother I gave him yesterday"/"They call me cruel hearted, I care not what they say", 1875

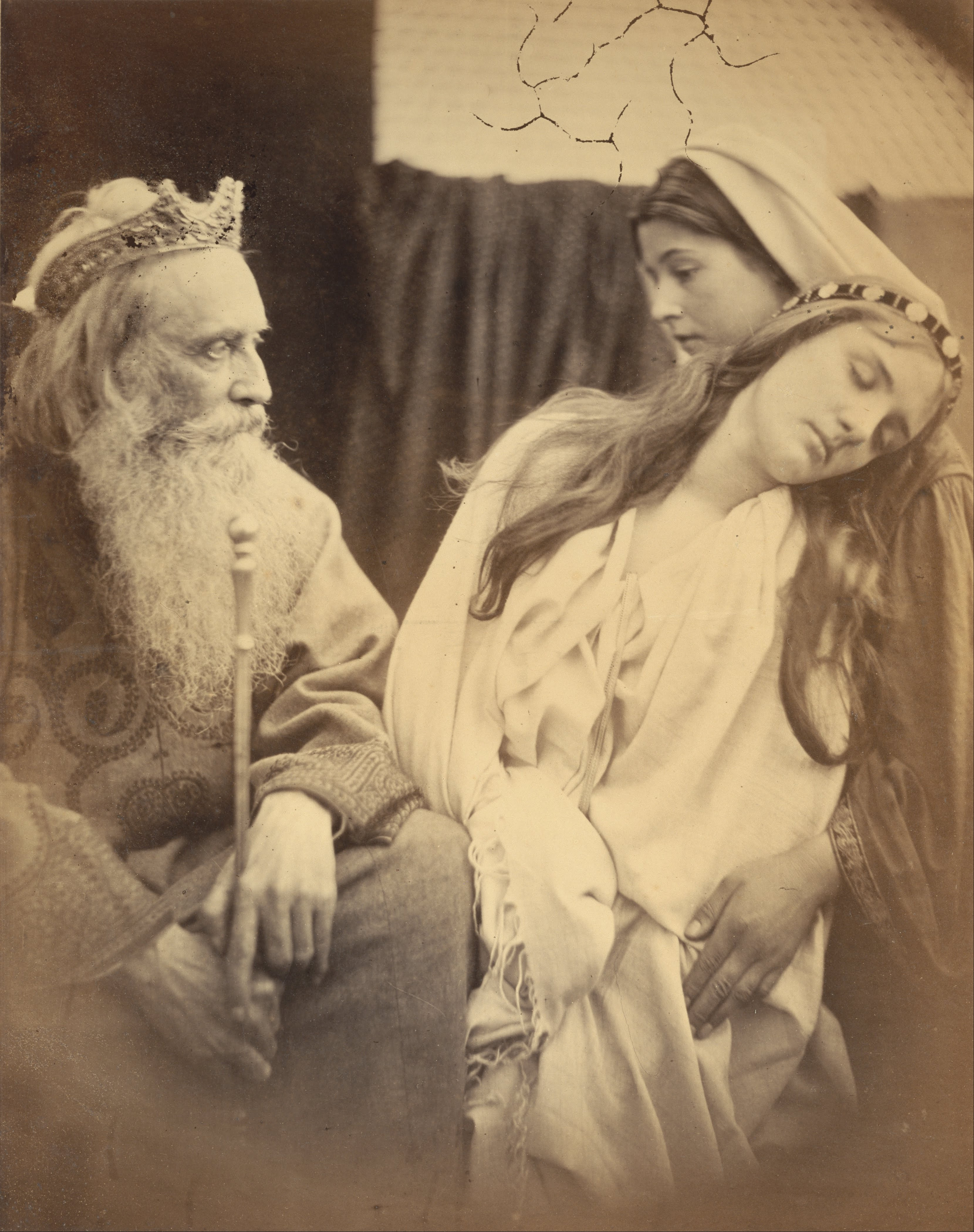
Queen Esther before King Ahasuerus, 1865

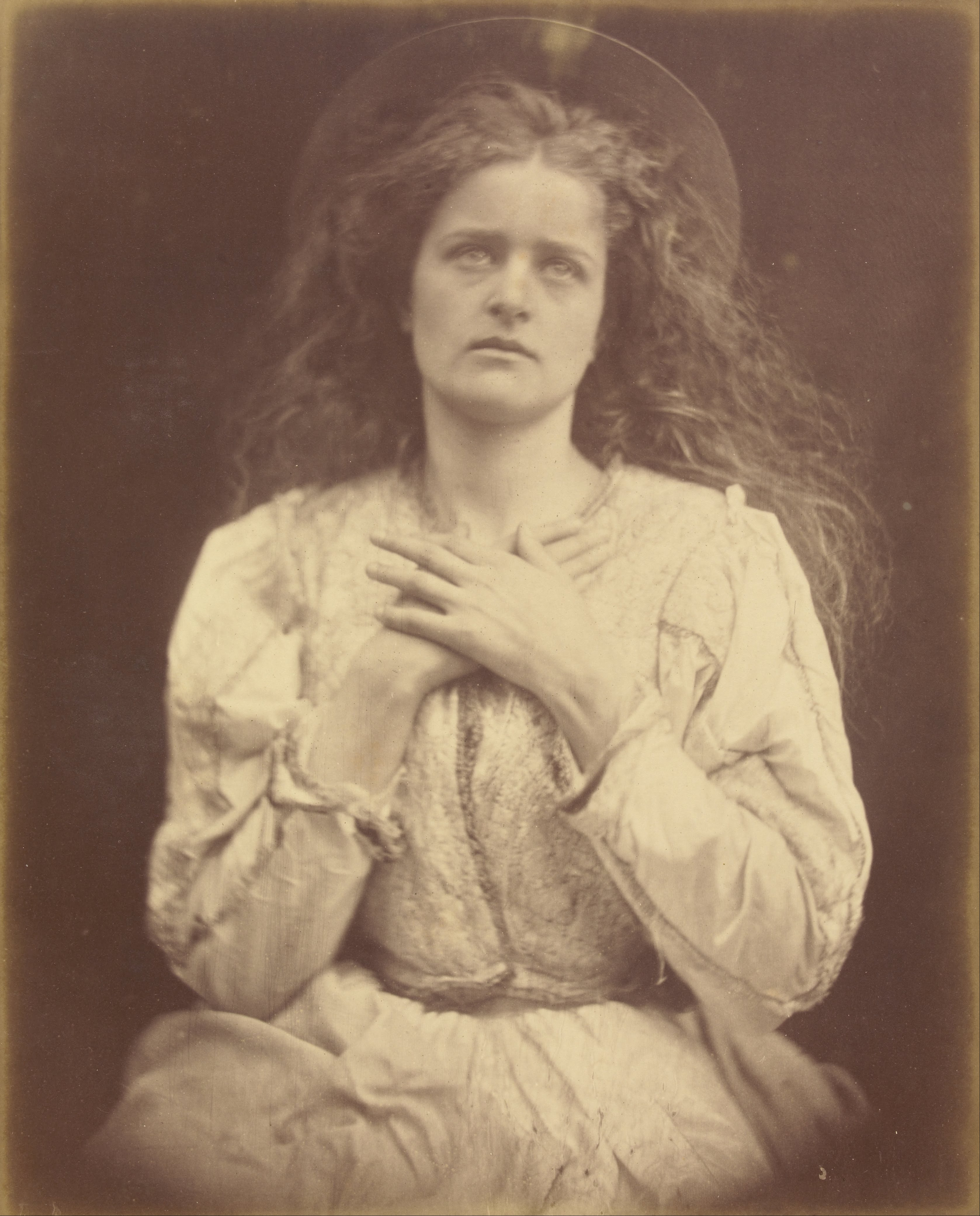
"So now I think my time is near – I trust it is – I know"/"The blessed Music went that way my soul will have to go", 1875

==== Idylls of the King ====
In 1874, Tennyson asked Cameron to create illustrations for a new edition of his Idylls of the King, a popular series of poems about Arthurian legends. Cameron worked on this commission for three months. However, she was unhappy with the final publication, and complained that the small size of her images depleted their significance. This prompted Cameron to issue a deluxe version of the Idylls of the King which featured twelve photographs as full-size prints. This series of images, influenced by Watts, was her last large-scale project and is considered the peak of her illustrative work.

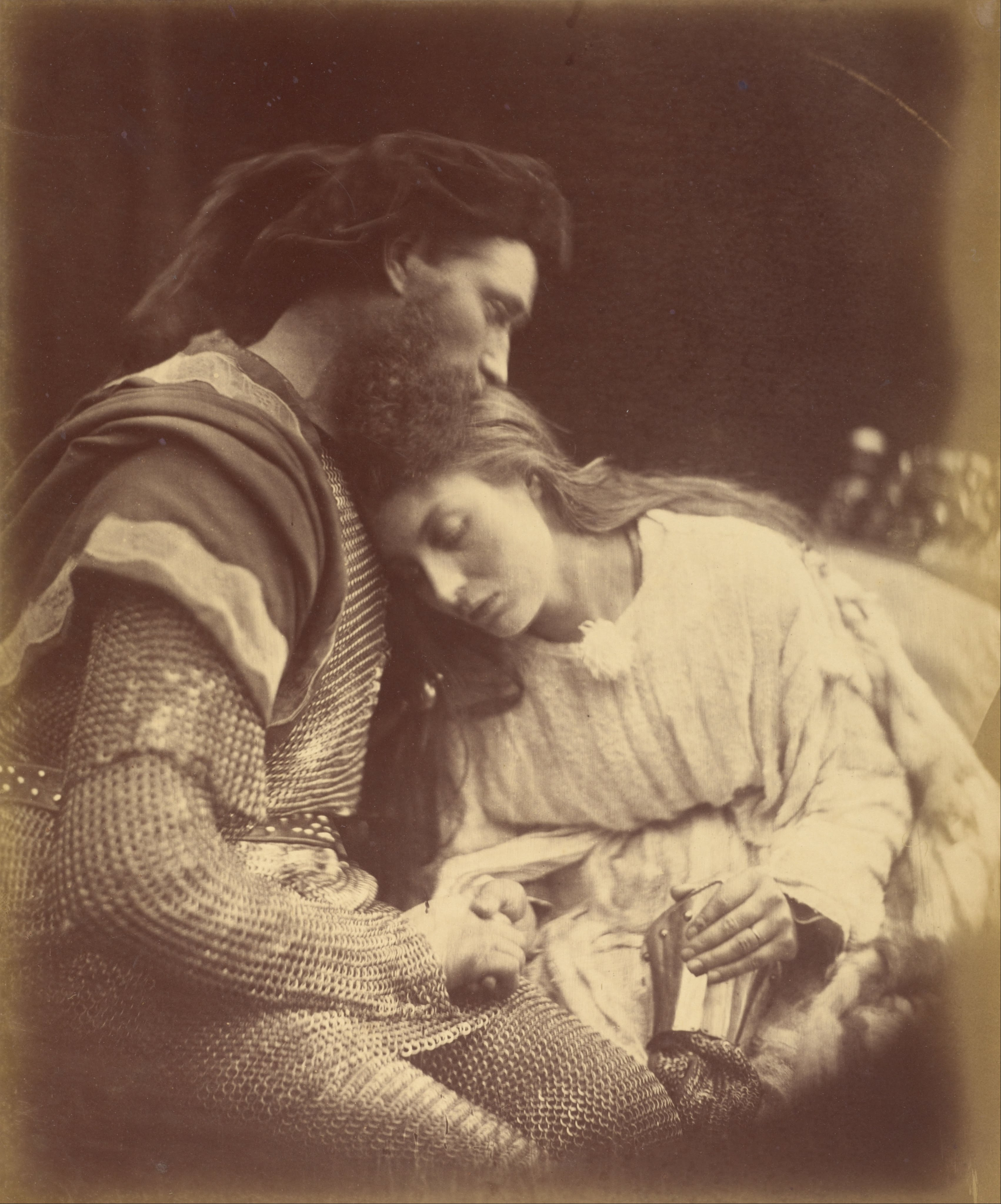
Parting of Sir Lancelot and Queen Guinevere, 1874

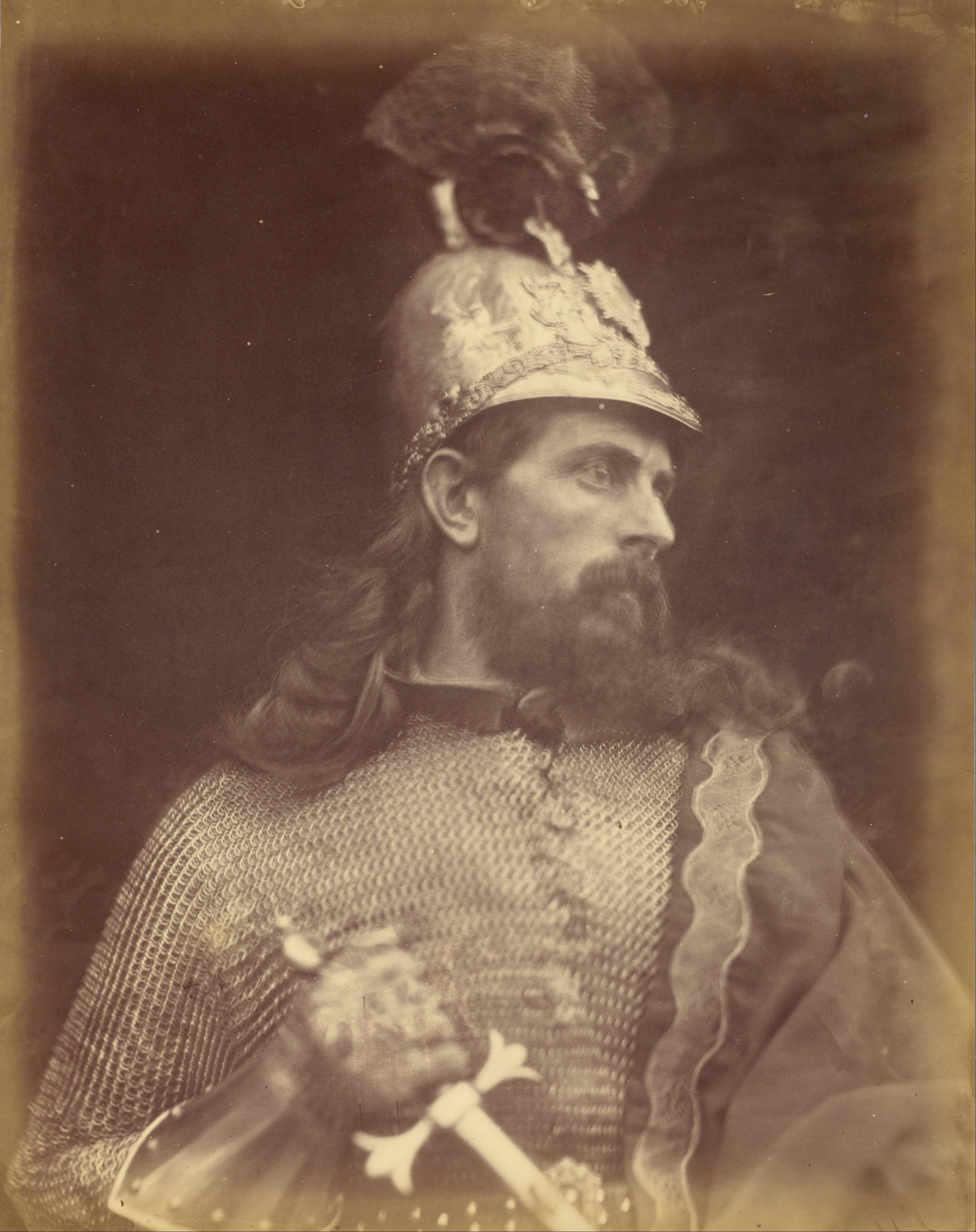
King Arthur, 1874

== Reception and legacy ==
=== Contemporary reception ===
In her own time, Cameron's photographs found a contentious audience, with many criticising her use of soft focus and her unretouched prints.

In 1865, The Photographic Journal reviewed her images, commenting:

Mrs. Cameron exhibits her series of out-of-focus portraits of celebrities. We must give this lady credit for daring originality, but at the expense of all other photographic qualities. A true artist would employ all the resources at his disposal, in whatever branch of art he might practise. In these pictures, all that is good in photography has been neglected and the shortcomings of the art are prominently exhibited. We are sorry to have to speak thus severely on the works of a lady, but we feel compelled to do so in the interest of the art.

The Photographic News echoed this sentiment:

What in the name of all the nitrate of silver that ever turned white into black have these pictures in common with good photography? Smudged, torn, dirty, undefined, and in some cases almost unreadable, there is hardly one of them that ought not to have been washed off the plate as soon as it appeared. We cannot but think that this lady's highly imaginative and artistic efforts might be supplemented by the judicious employment of a small boy with a wash leather, and a lens screwed a trifle less out of accurate definition.

The Illustrated London News provided an alternative perspective, writing that her images were "the nearest approach to art, or rather the most bold and successful applications of the principles of fine-art to photography".

=== Early impact ===
Cameron's niece, Julia Prinsep Stephen (née Jackson; 1846–1895), wrote a biography of Cameron that appeared in the first edition of the Dictionary of National Biography, 1886.

A few years later, George Bernard Shaw reviewed a posthumous exhibition of Cameron's, writing:

While the portraits of Herschel, Tennyson and Carlyle beat hollow anything I have ever seen, right on the same wall, and virtually in the same frame, there are photographs of children with no clothes on, or else the underclothes by way of propriety, with palpably paper wings, most inartistically grouped and artlessly labelled as angels, saints or fairies. No-one would imagine that the artist who produced the marvellous Carlyle would have produced such childish trivialities.

Virginia Woolf wrote a comic portrayal of the "Freshwater circle" in her only play Freshwater. Later, in collaboration with Roger Fry, Woolf also edited the first major collection of Cameron's photographs, Victorian Photographs of Famous Men and Fair Women, published in 1926. In the introduction to this collection, Fry wrote that Cameron's allegorical photographs "must all be judged as failures from an aesthetic viewpoint". He was more charitable toward her other work, writing that she had "a wonderful perception of character as it is expressed in form" and that her work was superior to the portraits of James Abbott McNeill Whistler and Watts.

Despite the publication of this collection, Cameron's work remained obscure until the 1940s.

=== Mid-century rediscovery ===
Helmut Gernsheim, after seeing photographs that Cameron had donated hanging in the waiting room of a Hampshire railway station, published a book on her work that helped re-establish her reputation. Gernsheim's review echoed the sentiments of Shaw and Fry, criticising her allegorical and illustrative photos while praising her portraits:

If the majority of Mrs. Cameron's subject pictures seem to us affected, ludicrous and amateurish, and appear in our opinion to be failures, how masterly, on the other hand, are her straightforward, truthful portraits, which are entirely free from false sentiment, and which compensate for the errors of taste in her studies.

In 1984, Mike Weaver disputed this analysis in his book Julia Margaret Cameron 1815–1879, where he elevated Cameron's tableaux as sincere religious interpretations. Weaver also criticised the characterisations of Cameron's personality that focused on her supposed eccentricities.

Gernsheim wrote Masterpieces of Victorian Photography 1840–1900 to accompany the Festival of Britain event that marked the centenary of "the first important exhibition of photography ever held [at the 1851 Great Exhibition]". In selecting photographs from his collection for the event, Gernsheim chose Cameron's "Florence Fisher" as the frontispiece of the catalogue. Also, her 1867 portrait of Sir Henry Taylor was one of the 16 images reproduced in the central section of photographs. Only one other photographer has more than one image in the booklet: two of P. H. Delamotte's scenes of the Crystal Palace in 1859. In the entry for Cameron, Gernsheim writes: "Her brilliant portraits of [the great Victorians] rank with those off Hill and Adamson, and Nadar, as the finest produced in the nineteenth century ... Mrs Cameron's large head studies are purely photographic in style, and far in advance of her time." Twenty-six of her portraits were exhibited.

=== 21st century reception ===
Colin Ford, in the Encyclopedia of Nineteenth-Century Photography calls her images "extraordinarily powerful" and "arguably the first 'close-up' photographs in history". He continues:

Her visualisations of poetry are different in style and achievement from those of any other photographer of the time. Her contemporaries decorated books of poetry by Burns, Gray, Milton, Scott, Shakespeare and others with picturesque landscapes, occasionally peopling these with attractively disposed figures in the scenery, but rarely illustrating actual characters or incidents from the story.

For the Metropolitan Museum of Art's Heilbrunn Timeline of Art History, Malcolm Daniel writes:

Her artistic goals for photography, informed by the outward appearance and spiritual content of fifteenth-century Italian painting, were wholly original in her medium. She aimed for neither the finish and formalized poses common in the commercial portrait studios, nor for the elaborate narratives of other Victorian "high art" photographers such as H. P. Robinson and O. G. Rejlander.

Janet Malcolm, in "The Genius of the Glass House" writes that "Cameron's compositions have more connection to the family album pictures of recalcitrant relatives who have been herded together for the obligatory group picture than they do to the masterpieces of Western painting" but that "The beauty that Cameron found, and in a surprising number of cases was able to arrest, among the aging and aged men of the Victorian literary and art establishment is a cornerstone of her achievement".

In 2003, the J. Paul Getty Museum published a catalogue of Cameron's known surviving photographs. One caption of a portrait of Alice Liddell (whom Cameron photographed as Alethea, Pomona, Ceres, and St. Agnes in 1872) claims that "Cameron's photographic portraits are considered among the finest in the early history of photography".

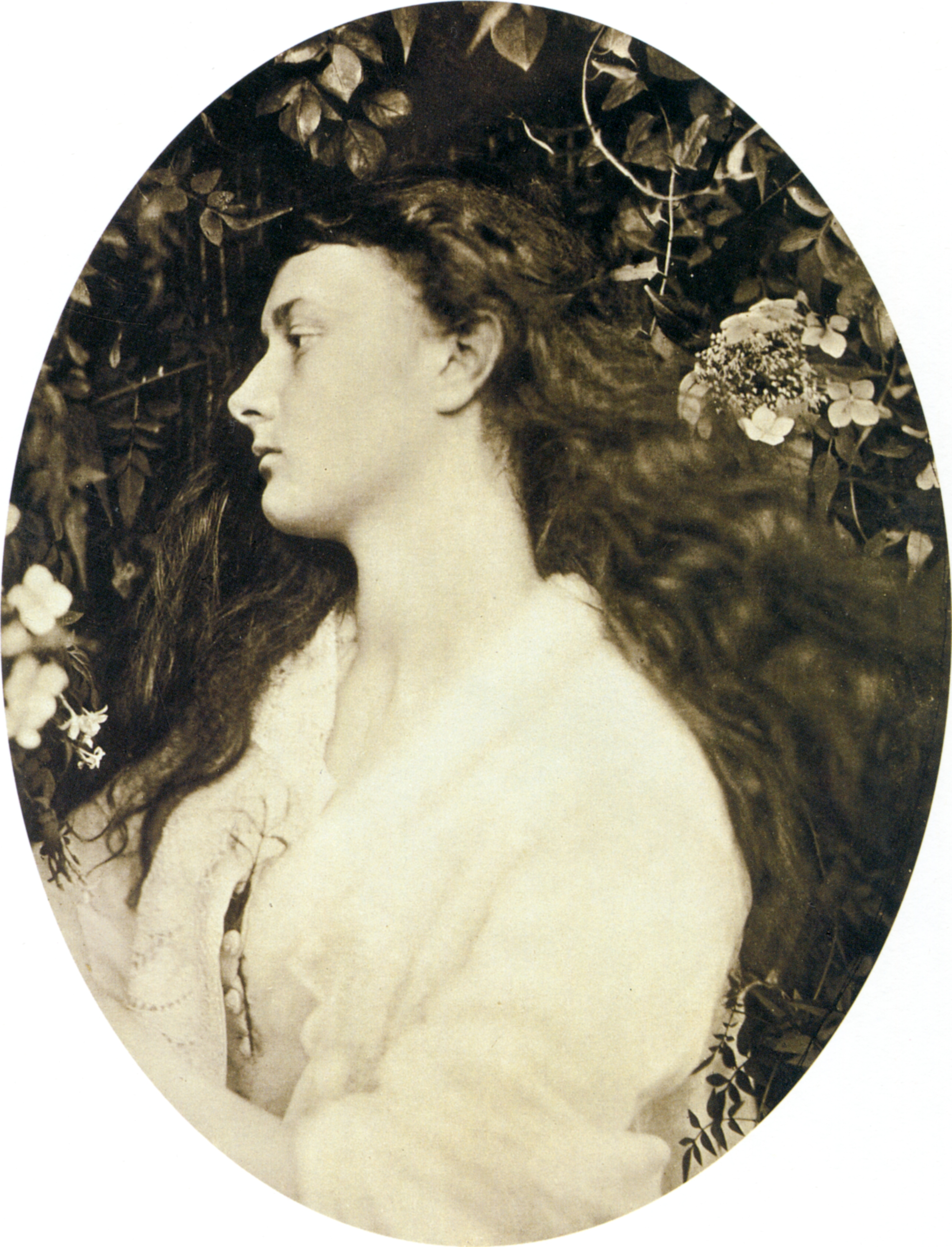
Alice Liddell as "Alethea", 1872

In 2018, Cameron's Norman Album from 1869 was deemed by the UK government's advisory committee on the export of works of art to be of "outstanding aesthetic importance and significance to the study of the history of photography and, in particular, the work of Julia Margaret Cameron—one of the most significant photographers of the 19th century".

In 2019 Cameron was inducted into the International Photography Hall of Fame and Museum.

In 2026, English Heritage unveiled a Blue Plaque in Cameron's honour on 10 Chesham Place, Belgravia, London, where she lived from 1848 in a house designed by Thomas Cubitt.

=== Museum and Trust ===
Dimbola on the Isle of Wight houses the Dimbola Museum and Galleries owned and run by the Julia Margaret Cameron Trust, a registered charity that promotes her life and work.

== Retrospective exhibitions ==
Major retrospectives include the Metropolitan Museum of Art in New York (2013); the Victoria and Albert Museum (2015) for a 200th anniversary (this travelled to Sydney, Australia); and the National Portrait Gallery (2018) placed her work in relationship to the work of her contemporaries, Lady Clementina Hawarden, Oscar Rejlander, and Lewis Carroll.

Retrospective exhibitions include:

Title	Dates	Institution	Country
Julia Margaret Cameron	16 December 1960 – 31 January 1961	Limelight Gallery	United States
Mrs. Cameron's photographs from the life	22 January – 10 March 1974	Stanford University Museum of Art	United States
Julia Margaret Cameron (1815–1879)	4 December 1984 – 27 January 1985	Fundación Juan March	Spain
Julia Margaret Cameron: Her Work and Career	4 April – 25 May 1986	International Museum of Photography at George Eastman House	United States
Whisper of the Muse	10 September – 16 November 1986	Getty Villa	United States
Whisper of the Muse at Loyola Marymount University	12 September – 25 October 1986	Laband Gallery	United States
Portrait Photographs by Julia Margaret Cameron	25 November 1987 – 14 February 1988	National Portrait Gallery	United States
Julia Margaret Cameron: The Creative Process	15 October 1996 – 5 January 1997	Getty Villa	United States
Julia Margaret Cameron: The Creative Process	4 February – 3 May 1998	Art Gallery of Ontario	Canada
Julia Margaret Cameron: Nineteenth Century Photographic Genius	6 February – 26 May 2003	National Portrait Gallery	United Kingdom
Julia Margaret Cameron: Nineteenth Century Photographic Genius	5 June – 30 August 2003	National Media Museum	United Kingdom
Julia Margaret Cameron, Photographer	21 October 2003 – 11 January 2004	Getty Center	United States
Julia Margaret Cameron	19 August 2013 – 5 January 2014	Metropolitan Museum of Art	United States
Julia Margaret Cameron	15 August – 25 October 2015	Art Gallery of New South Wales	Australia
Julia Margaret Cameron: Influence and Intimacy	24 September 2015 – 28 March 2016	Science Museum	United Kingdom
Julia Margaret Cameron	28 November 2015 – 21 February 2016	Victoria and Albert Museum	United Kingdom
Julia Margaret Cameron: A Woman who Breathed Life into Photographs	2 July – 19 September 2016	Mitsubishi Ichigokan Museum	Japan
Victorian Giants: The Birth of Art Photography	1 March – 20 May 2018	National Portrait Gallery	United Kingdom
Arresting Beauty: Julia Margaret Cameron	3 May – 28 July 2024	Milwaukee Art Museum	United States
Arresting Beauty: Julia Margaret Cameron	30 May – 14 September 2025	Morgan Library & Museum	United States

== Albums ==
Title	Dedication date
Virginia Album	-
Mia Album	7 July 1863
Watts Album	22 February 1864
Herschel Album	26 November 1864 (Note: According to Cameron's dedication, on 8 September 1867 the album was "completed & restored with renewed / devotedness of grateful friendship".)
Overstone Album	5 August 1865
Lindsay Album	-
Thackeray Album	1864 (Note: The dedication specifies that the album was "Commenced year 1864".)
Henry Taylor Album	(Note: This album contains no dedication.)
The Norman Album	7 September 1869
Aubrey Ashworth Taylor Album	29 September 1869
Anne Thackery Ritchie Album	-
Harding Hay Cameron Album (2)	-
Julia Hay Norman miniature Album	-
Idylls of the King miniature Album	-
Idylls of the King Album (4)	-

== List of selected publications ==
- Cameron, Julia Margaret (1973) [1926]. Victorian photographs of famous men & fair women. Introductions by Virginia Woolf and Roger Fry. D. R. Godine. ISBN 978-0-87923-076-0.
- Cameron, J. M. P. (1875). Illustrations by Julia Margaret Cameron of Alfred Tennyson's Idylls of the King and other poems Archived 29 September 2007 at the Wayback Machine
- Cameron, J. M. P. (1889). Unfinished autobiography "Annals of my glass house" by Julia Margaret Cameron, written 1874, first published 1889
- Cameron, J. M. (1975). The Herschel album: an album of photographs Archived 29 September 2007 at the Wayback Machine. London (2 St Martin's Place, WC2H 0HE): National Portrait Gallery
- Cameron, J. M., & Ford, C. (1975). The Cameron Collection: an album of photographs Archived 29 September 2007 at the Wayback Machine. Wokingham: Van Nostrand Reinhold for the National Portrait Gallery
- Cameron, J. M. P., & Weaver, M. (1986). Whisper of the muse: the Overstone album & other photographs Archived 29 September 2007 at the Wayback Machine. Malibu: J. Paul Getty Museum
- Cameron, J. M. P., & Rosen, J. (2024). Julia Margaret Cameron: The Colonial Shadows of Victorian Photography.Paul Mellon Centre for Studies in Britich Art, distributed by Yale University Press
