= The Mountain Nymph, Sweet Liberty =

1866 photograph by Julia Margaret Cameron

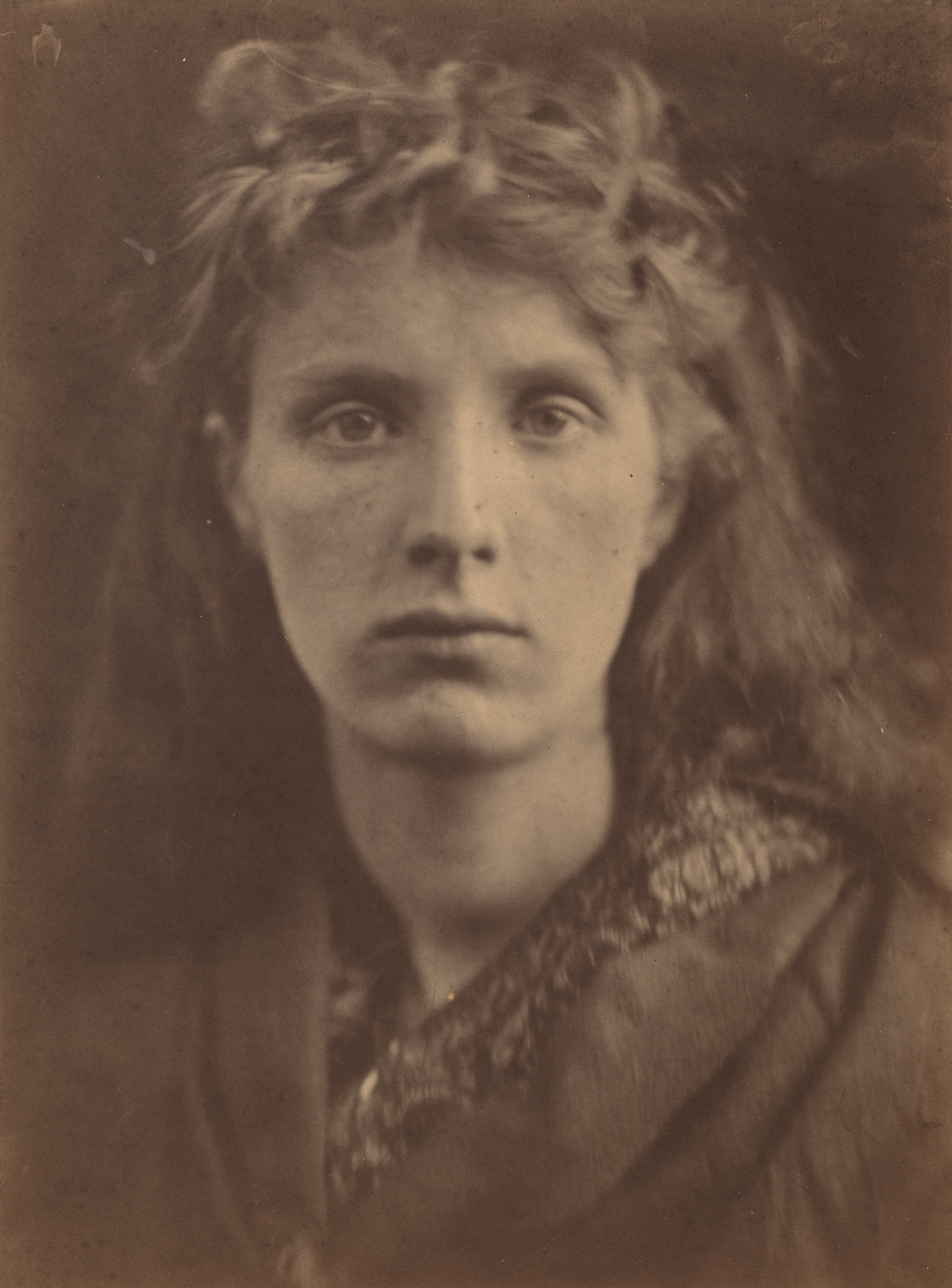
- An albumen silver print in the National Gallery of Art, Washington, D.C.
- Artist: Julia Margaret Cameron
- Year: June 1866
- Medium: Albumen silver print from a wet-collodion glass negative
- Subject: Annie Keene (née Edwards)

The Mountain Nymph, Sweet Liberty is an 1866 photograph by the British photographer Julia Margaret Cameron. Made in England in June 1866 as an albumen contact print from a wet-collodion glass negative, it is a close head-and-shoulders portrait of Annie Keene (née Edwards), who looks directly towards the camera. Cameron took its title from the phrase “The Mountain Nymph, sweet Liberty” in John Milton's poem L'Allegro.

The photograph survives in several contemporary prints, including examples in the Metropolitan Museum of Art, in New York, the National Gallery of Art, in Washington, D.C., the National Portrait Gallery, in London and the Herschel Album at the National Science and Media Museum, in Braford. The work received an admiring contemporary response from the scientist John Herschel.

== Background and sitter ==
Cameron commonly recruited friends, relatives, neighbours, and members of her household as sitters. Keene was unusual in apparently working as a professional model: the Metropolitan Museum of Art describes the sitting as one of only two known occasions on which Cameron used a professional model rather than someone from her social or domestic circle. Cameron identified her only as “Mrs. Keene”. The National Portrait Gallery identifies her as Annie Keene, née Edwards (1843–1901), a model who also sat for the Pre-Raphaelite painter Edward Burne-Jones.

The same June 1866 sitting produced Cameron's photograph Cassiopeia, in which Keene adopts a different pose. The Science Museum Group describes Keene as one of Cameron's rare professional models and records The Mountain Nymph as part of an album that Cameron assembled for Herschel.

== Composition and title ==
Keene's head and shoulders nearly fill the vertical image. She is shown against a dark background, with long, wavy hair partly gathered around her face and falling behind her shoulders. Her garment has broad lapels over patterned clothing. She faces the camera directly, with her eyes wide open and her lips closed. The composition contains no scenery or narrative props.

The title comes from L'Allegro, in which Milton personifies liberty as a “mountain nymph”. Surviving prints and collection records use slightly different punctuation and wording. The National Gallery of Art gives The Mountain Nymph, Sweet Liberty; the Metropolitan Museum of Art omits the comma; and the Herschel Album print is catalogued as The Mountain Nymph Mrs Keene.

Individual impressions vary in size and mounting. The National Gallery of Art's albumen silver print measures 36.1 cm × 26.7 cm (14.2 in × 10.5 in), whereas the Metropolitan Museum's print measures 36.1 cm × 28.6 cm (14.2 in × 11.3 in). A much smaller National Portrait Gallery impression, mounted on a gold-edged cabinet card, has an image measuring 129 mm × 98 mm (5.1 in × 3.9 in).

== Reception and interpretation ==
Cameron sent a print to Herschel, a close friend. In his reply, Herschel called the sitter “absolutely alive” and recognised the picture as Cameron's “own special style”. The Metropolitan Museum interprets his response as a reaction to the photograph's pronounced sense of physical presence and psychological contact with the viewer.

Ford's article, “'Mountain Nymph' and 'Damnèd Villain': Posing for Julia Margaret Cameron”, examines Cameron's use of Keene and another professional model, Angelo Colarossi. Hager's feminist study treats the photograph as an encounter between Cameron, an upper-middle-class Anglo-Indian photographer, and a working-class English model whose life is sparsely documented. Hager combines archival evidence with fictional reconstruction in an attempt to recover Keene's perspective and a female subjectivity that she argues has been obscured in the surviving historical record.

The photograph has also been reproduced and discussed in surveys and monographs on Cameron's career, including Colin Ford's study of the Herschel Album, Mike Weaver's monograph, Joanne Lukitsh's career study, the Getty Museum's In Focus volume, and the exhibition catalogue Julia Margaret Cameron's Women.

== Prints and exhibitions ==
The Herschel Album impression, made in June 1866, is held by the National Science and Media Museum. The album page has overall dimensions of 331 mm × 274 mm (13.0 in × 10.8 in). The Metropolitan Museum acquired its large-format print in 1941; it is catalogued as object 41.21.15. The National Gallery of Art purchased its impression in 1997 as accession 1997.97.1. The National Portrait Gallery's cabinet-card version was donated by Cordelia Curle in 1959 and is catalogued as NPG x18061.

The National Gallery of Art impression was shown in The Pre-Raphaelite Lens: British Photography and Painting, 1848–1875, held at the gallery and the Musée d'Orsay in 2010–2011, and in In Light of the Past at the National Gallery of Art in 2015. The National Portrait Gallery impression was included in its 2003 exhibition Julia Margaret Cameron.

In 2025, the Morgan Library & Museum exhibited the work in an exhibit Arresting Beauty: Julia Margaret Cameron.
