= Hyde Park Gardens =

Two roads in the City of Westminster, London

Coordinates: 51°30′45.5″N 0°10′16″W

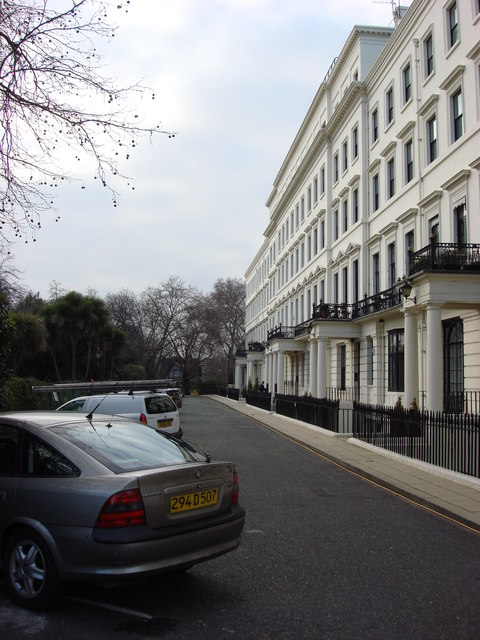
17 Hyde Park Gardens

Hyde Park Gardens, also known as Hyde Park Terrace consists of two roads running adjacent to the north western corner of Hyde Park, Westminster, Greater London. Number 1 Hyde Park Gardens runs up to Number 23 with a large private communal garden and then the road separates to allow access to The Ring and into Hyde Park and the neighbouring Kensington Gardens. This section contains the High Commission of Sri Lanka. Numbers 24 to 31 continue on a private gated road also with their own communal gardens buffering them from the busy Bayswater Road. They are amongst the most exclusive properties on the northern side of Hyde Park and date from the early 19th century. Grand white stucco fronted houses now converted into equally grand flats. Access is strictly controlled via 24-hour porterage.

Hyde Park Gardens is listed Grade II in two groups on the National Heritage List for England, as 1–24, and 25–38 are jointly listed with 22-35 Stanhope Terrace.

An early resident of 18 Hyde Park Gardens was Maria Drummond, widow of Thomas Drummond and the adopted daughter of Richard "Conversation" Sharp. Here is a description of a party that took place there on 18 March 1844:

...Dined with the Bunburys. We left early & went to a party at Mrs Drummond's, which was very pleasant. Lady Morley was there, and Miss Lister, to whom she introduced me; Westmacott, whom I do not think Mrs Drummond – from her open praise of him - has an idea of marrying; the Sydney Smiths, Milmans, Mr Babbage, Faraday, Professor Wheatstone – who is a little man, young with spectacles, whom I should never have looked at had I not been told he was a lion. Faraday was there to look at the lamps, which are his own sort and consume their own smoke, and are twice as brilliant as any others. Mrs Drummond's house is quite lovely. Sydney Smith's idea is perfect – that the drawing room is the nearest thing to the Arabian Nights he ever saw. The walls are painted, the ceiling painted and gilt, the chairs white and gold, and looking glasses in all directions. Mrs Drummond was pleasant, as I think she generally is, and keeps her people well alive by always moving.

The library, designed by the architect Decimus Burton, was said to be the most beautiful feature of this particular house, where Macaulay and Archbishop Whately were also welcome visitors, and a further description of the downstairs accommodation has also survived, as follows:

The drawing room ceilings were painted in the 'Pompeian' manner, with a wealth of detail and a softness of colour which could be appreciated by looking into the tables of looking-glass provided for the purpose. Aubusson carpets, gilt chairs and sumptuous crimson brocade curtains completed the decoration. On the ground floor, a long library – fitted with birds-eye-maple book-cases and ornamented with Dresden china plaques, held Sharp's calf-bound books. Fine copies of classical bronzes stood on tables, and on the mantelpiece of rare Italian marble, and gave the room a somewhat learned and very pleasing appearance. Flowers from Fredley, sent up regularly by road, formed an important part of the decoration.

22 Hyde Park Gardens was listed as a Prisoner of War Camp, number 17, in the English Heritage Project Report, 2003 by Roger J C Thomas.

Hyde Park Gardens Mews lies behind the houses and originally served as stables for Hyde Park Gardens.

== Notable residents ==
- Yvonne Hackenbroch (1912–2012), museum curator and historian of jewellery, died at no. 31, four months after celebrating her 100th birthday.
- The photographer Antony Beauchamp, son-in-law of Winston Churchill, killed himself on 18 August 1957 by taking a barbiturate overdose at his flat in Hyde Park Gardens.
- William Henry Wills, 1st Baron Winterstoke (1830 - 1911), who was a member of the Wills tobacco family dynasty and the 1st chairman of Imperial Tobacco. His London residence was at 25 Hyde Park Gardens.
