= Dora Wordsworth =

Daughter of William Wordsworth

- Born: Dorothy Wordsworth; 16 August 1804
- Died: 9 July 1847 (aged 42)
- Resting place: St Oswald's Church, Grasmere, Cumbria, England
- Spouse: Edward Quillinan (1843–1847; her death)
- Parent(s): William Wordsworth; Mary Hutchinson

Dorothy "Dora" Wordsworth (16 August 1804 – 9 July 1847) was the daughter of poet William Wordsworth (1770–1850) and his wife Mary Hutchinson. Her infancy inspired William Wordsworth to write "Address to My Infant Daughter" in her honour. As an adult, she was further immortalised by him in the 1828 poem "The Triad", along with Edith Southey and Sara Coleridge, daughters of her father's fellow Lake Poets. In 1843, at the age of 39, Dora Wordsworth married Edward Quillinan. While her father initially opposed the marriage, the "temperate but persistent pressure" exerted by Isabella Fenwick, a close family friend, convinced him to relent.

Throughout her life, Wordsworth formed intense romantic attachments to both men and women, the most significant being her friendship with Maria Jane Jewsbury. Another close friend was Maria Kinnaird, adoptive daughter of Richard "Conversation" Sharp and the future wife of Thomas Drummond. Wordsworth and Kinnaird were friends from their teenage years and some of their correspondence has survived.

Described by her aunt and namesake Dorothy Wordsworth as "at times very beautiful", Dora Wordsworth was devoted to her father and a significant influence on his poetry. Their relationship was particularly close, with Coleridge's son Hartley describing how she "almost adored" him in an 1830 letter. However, Wordsworth also had literary abilities of her own, publishing a travel journal. Sara Coleridge complained after Wordsworth's death that her father's demands on her "frustrated a real talent".

Wordsworth died of tuberculosis at her parents' home, and is buried in the graveyard of St Oswald's Church, Grasmere, Cumbria, along with her parents and siblings, aunt Sarah Hutchinson, and Hartley Coleridge, son of Samuel Taylor Coleridge. After her death, her distraught father (who had already lost two of his children to illness), planted hundreds of daffodils in her memory in a field (later named Dora's Field) beside St. Mary's Church, Rydal. The site of Dora's Field, where daffodils are still cultivated today, is now owned by the National Trust.
