= The Norman Album =

Photo album by Julia Margaret Cameron

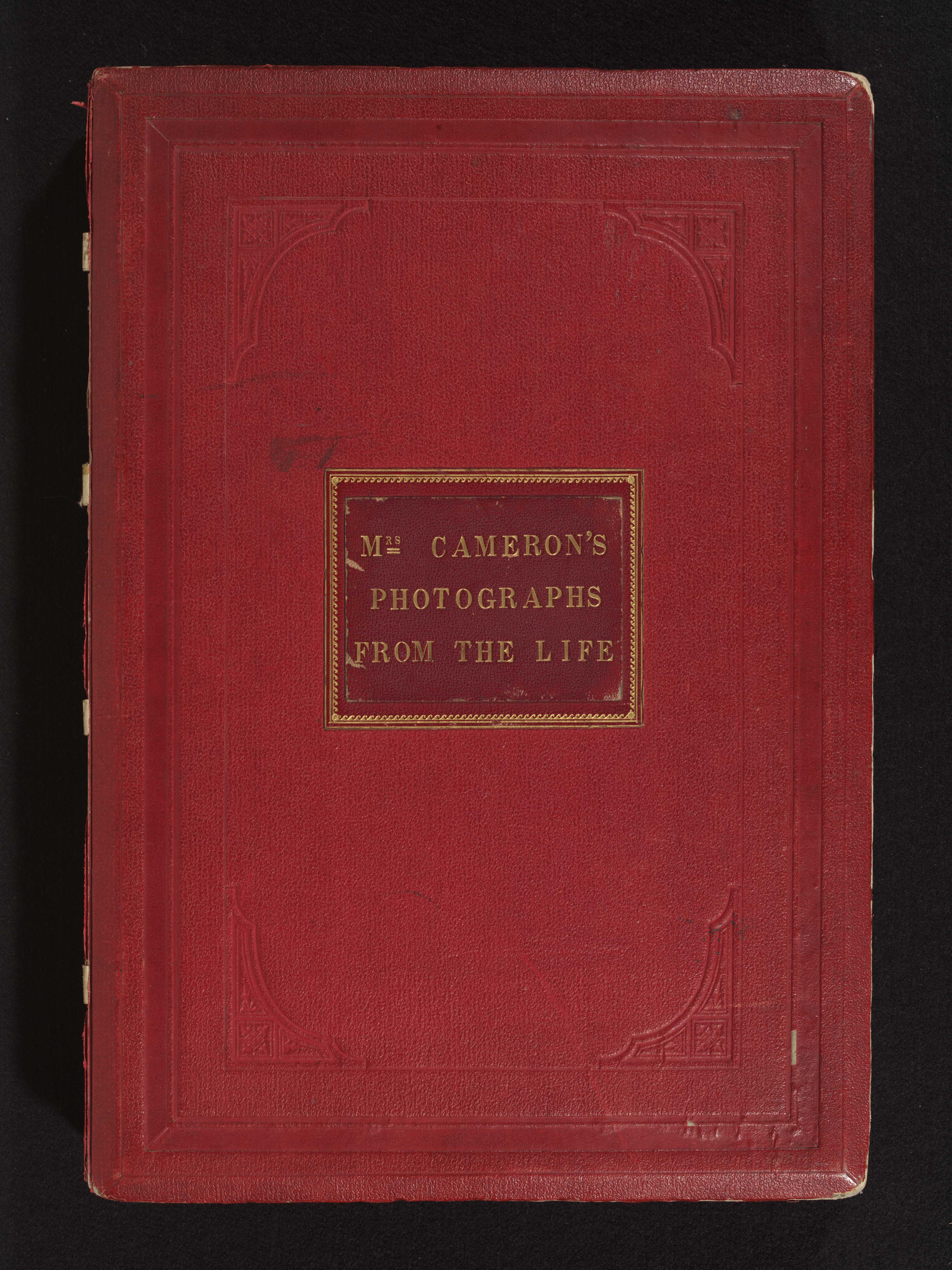
The front cover of the album, embossed with M^{rs} Cameron’s Photographs from the Life and bound in red morocco leather.

Mrs. Cameron's Photographs from the Life, commonly known as The Norman Album, is a photo album of portraits compiled between 1864 and 1869 by British photographer Julia Margaret Cameron. Comprising 74 albumen prints, it was presented as a gift to her daughter Julia Hay Norman and son-in-law Charles Norman in gratitude at their having introduced her to photography by giving her first camera. The dedication reads:

To the givers of my camera I dedicate /give these works of this camera, with all gratitude for the inexhaustible pleasure to me, & to hundreds, which has resulted from the gift.

— Freshwater Bay, Isle of Wight, 1869 Sep 9

Described as a "complete record of the intellectual aristocracy of the 1860s", notable portraits included are John Herschel, Alfred Tennyson, Charles Darwin, Henry Taylor, Benjamin Jowett, Prince Alemayehu of Ethiopia, and Julia Jackson (who was also Cameron's niece). Other portraits included photographs of the Cameron and Norman families, allegorical poses, and imagined historical scenes such as "Queen Esther fainting after begging King Ahasuerus to spare the Jews he has sentenced to death".

The album was the subject of an exhibition at the Stanford University Museum of Art in 1974.

The Reviewing Committee on the Export of Works of Art and Objects of Cultural Interest (RCEWA) reviewed the album in 2013 when an application to export for sale at the Maastricht book fair had been made. The committee concluded that the album met all three Waverley Criteria and the application was withdrawn. In 2016 it was consigned for sale by the lineal descendants of Julia Margaret Cameron’s daughter at the PhotoLondon photography fair. In February 2018, with the album being offered for purchase at a price of £3.7 million, the UK Arts Minister Michael Ellis placed a temporary export ban, in the hope that it would be purchased by a UK public institution. The decision was taken on the basis of a new review by the RCEWA, which declared "...the album’s outstanding aesthetic importance and significance to the study of the history of photography and, in particular, the work of Julia Margaret Cameron – one of the most significant photographers of the 19th century."

A valuation of £3.7 million was set and the export licence was deferred to allow a UK institution the opportunity to raise the funds to purchase the album. At the end of the initial deferral period, no offer to purchase the album had been made and we were not aware of any serious intention to raise funds. An export licence was therefore issued allowing its export from the UK. At the time of writing it is unclear who the purchaser was and the current location of the album is unknown.

== Gallery ==
A partial gallery of 12 images from the album, with scans published by the Department for Digital, Culture, Media and Sport on Flickr.

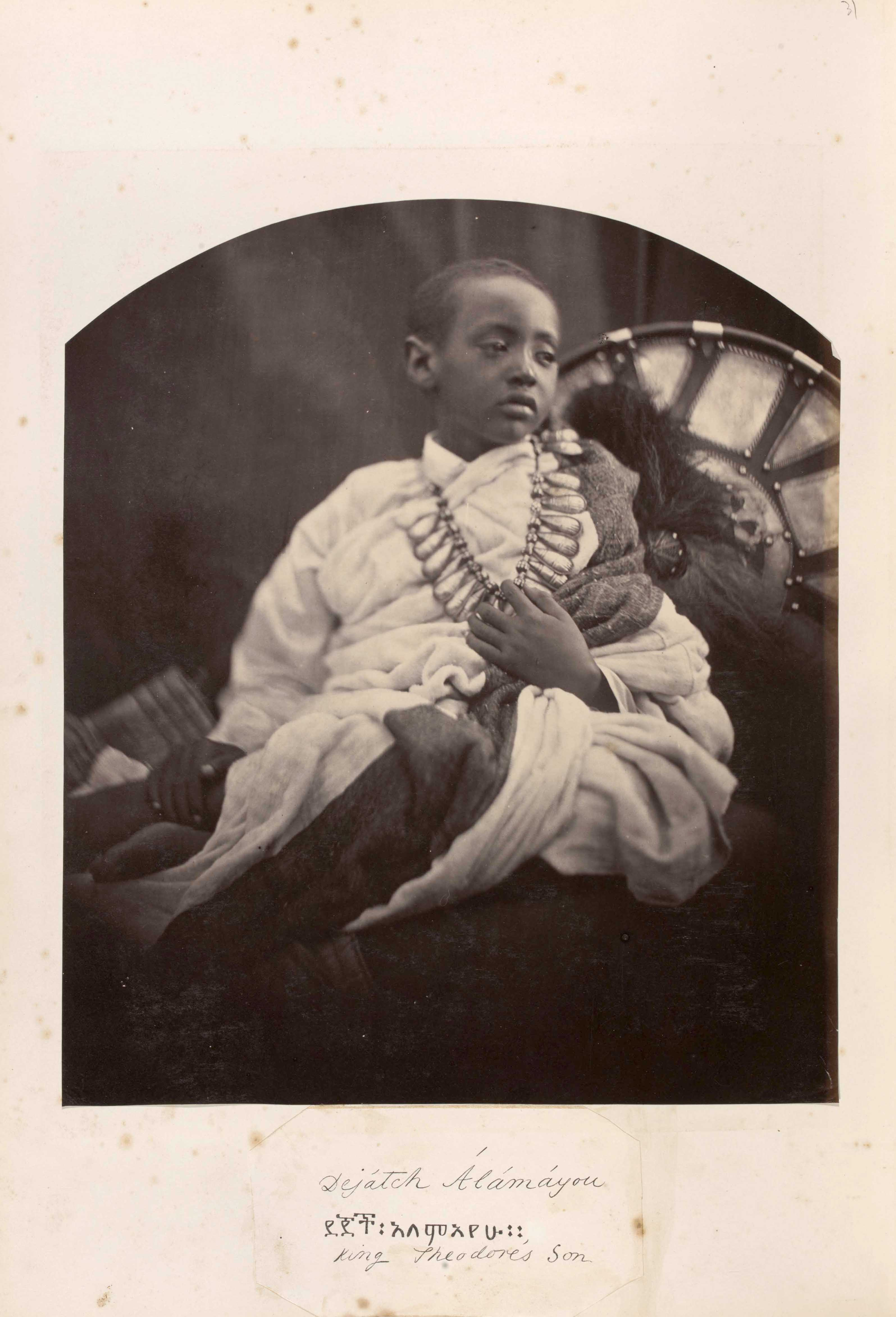
"Alamayou the son of King Theodore of Abyssinia"

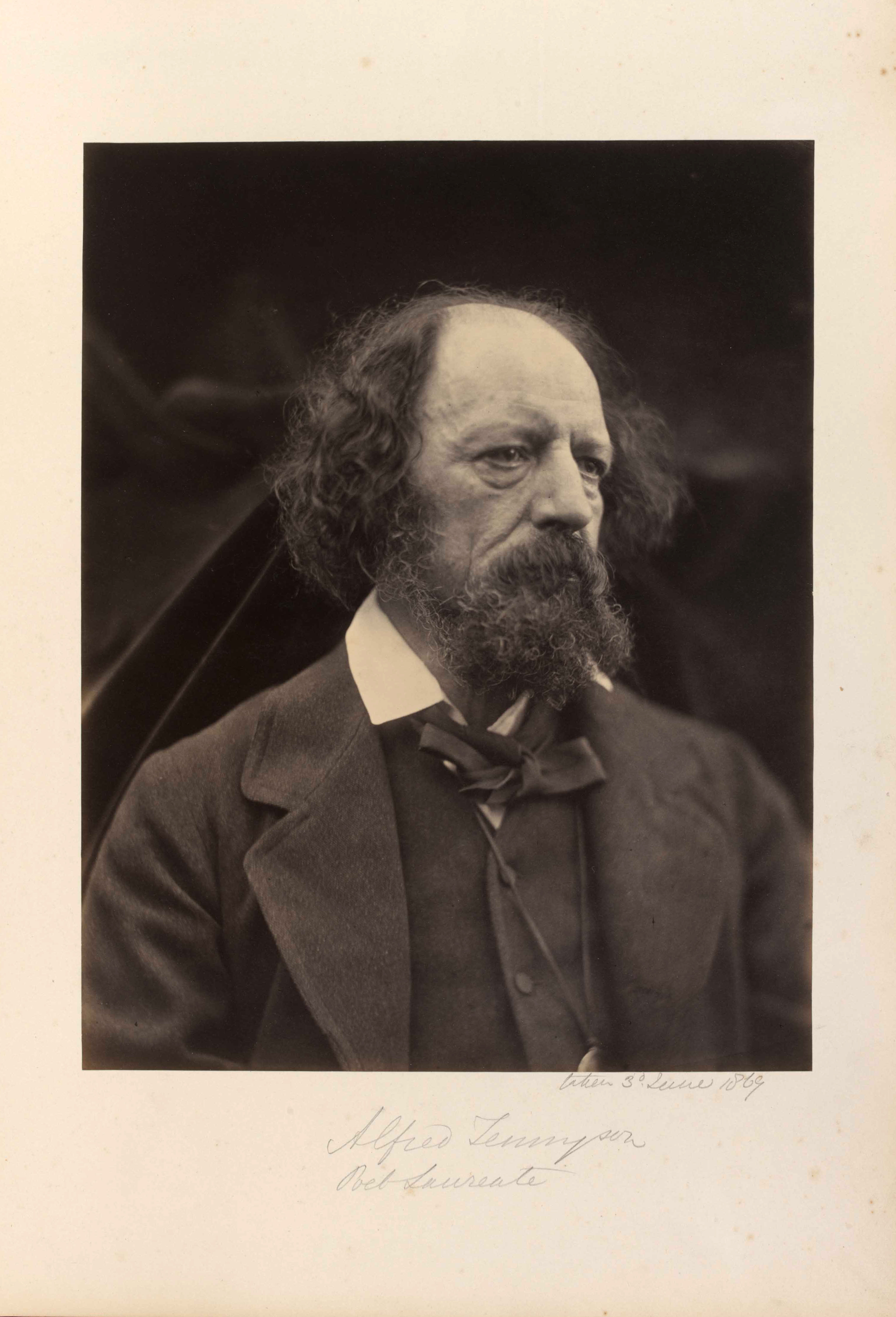
"Alfred Tennyson poet laureate, 3 June 1869"

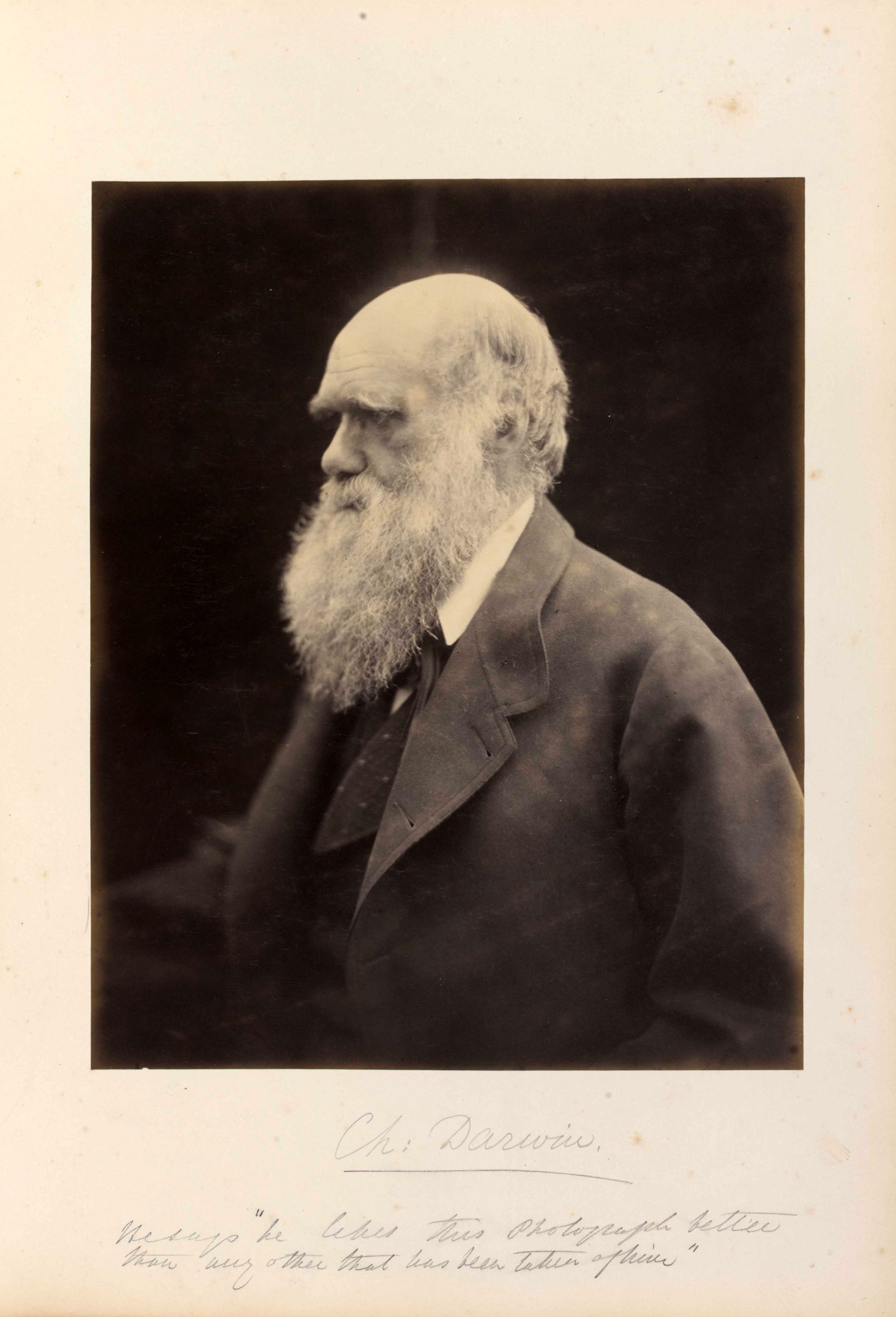
"Ch: Darwin. He likes this photo better than any other that has been taken of him"

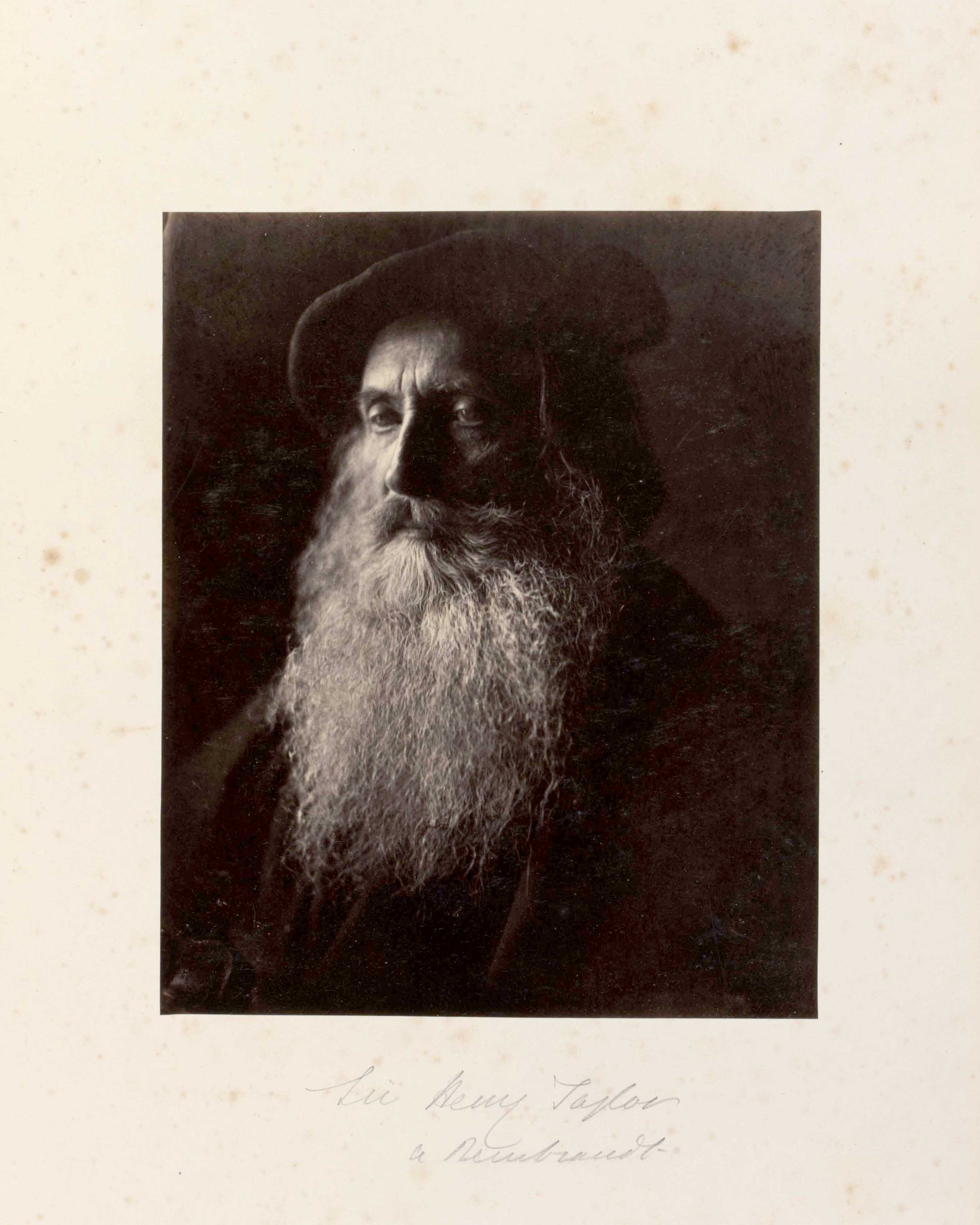
"Sir Henry Taylor"

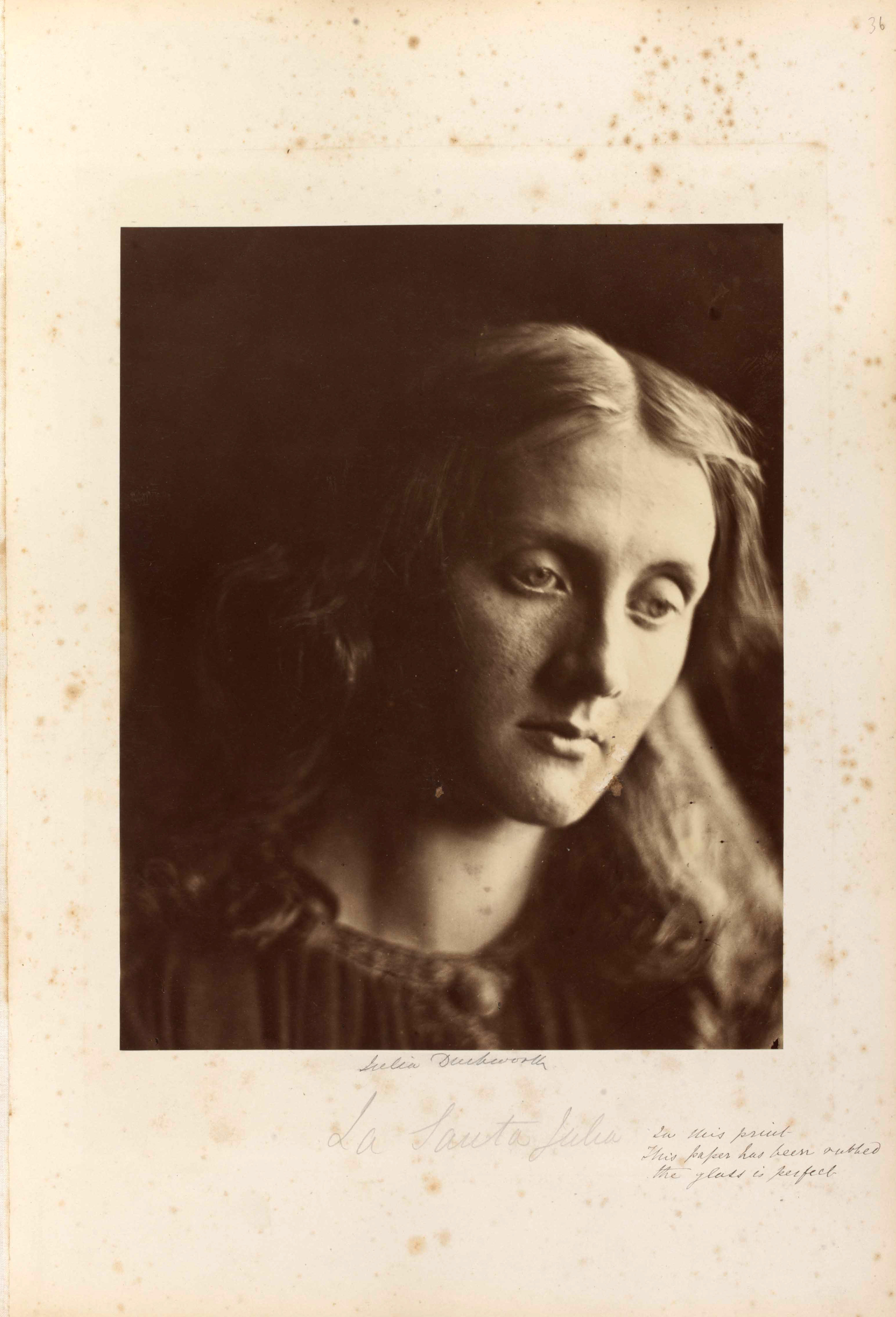
"Julia Duckworth, La Santa Julia"

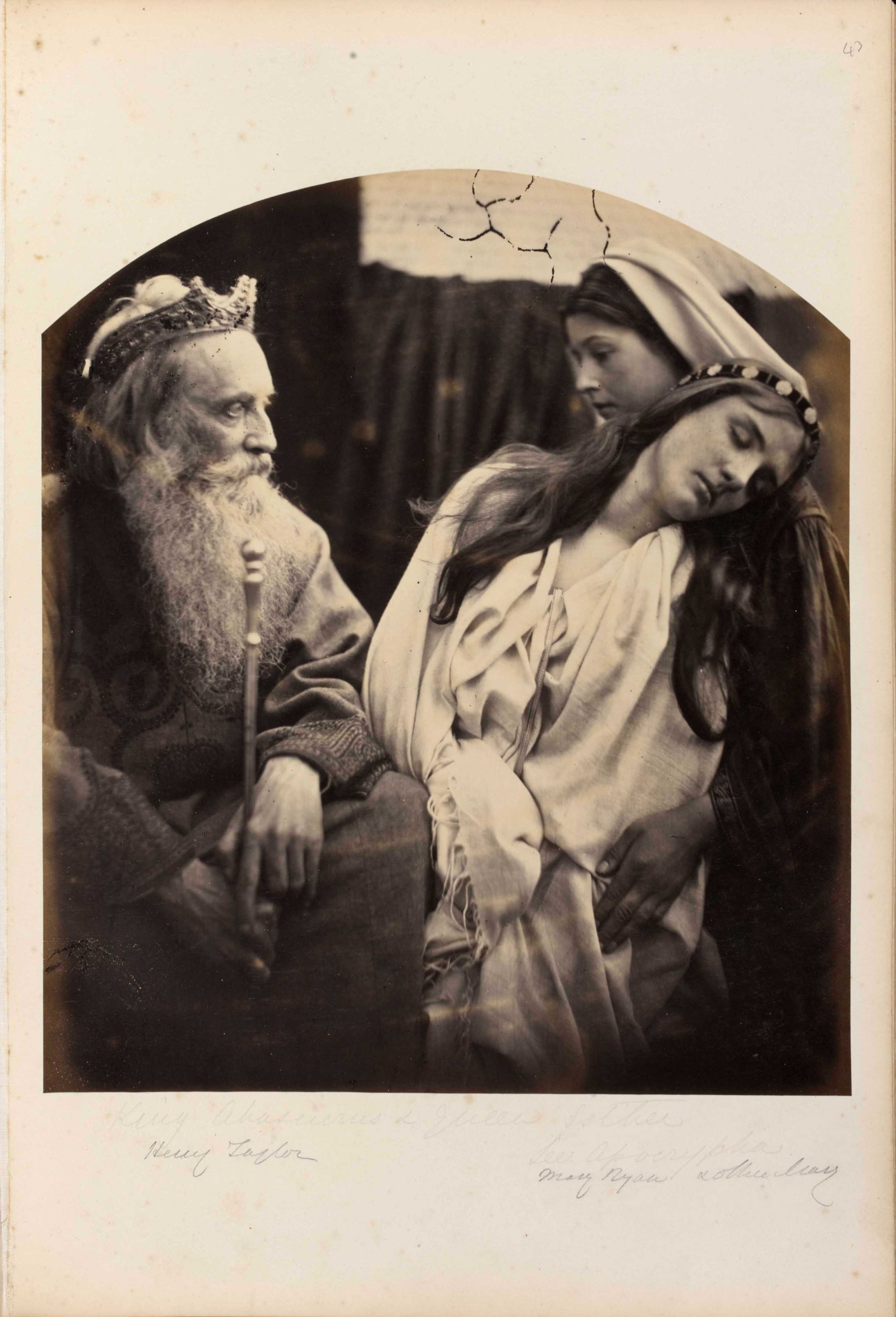
"King Ahasuerus and Queen Esther.
Henry Taylor Mary Ryan and Mary Kellaway"

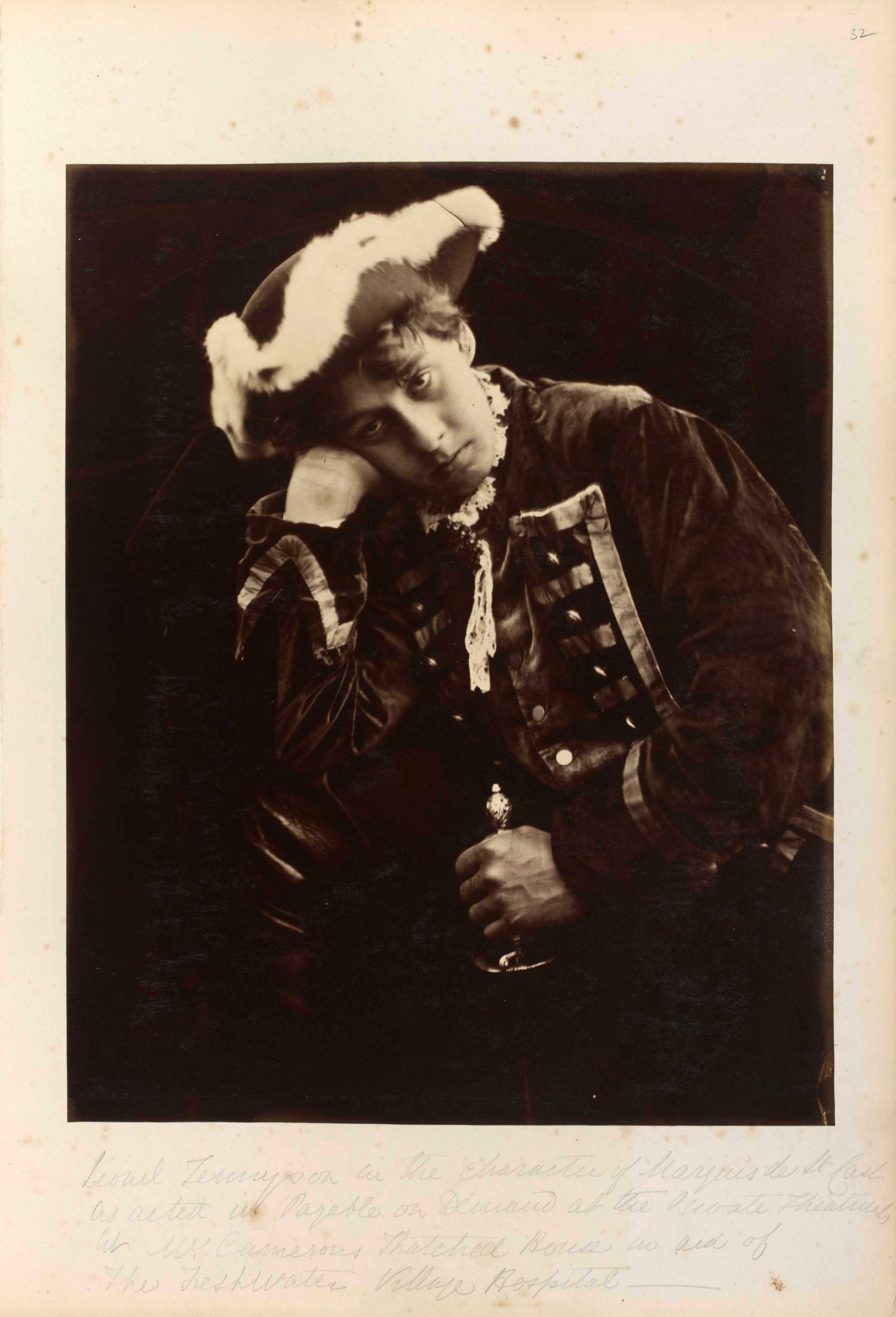
"Lionel Tennyson in the character of Marquis de St. Cast"

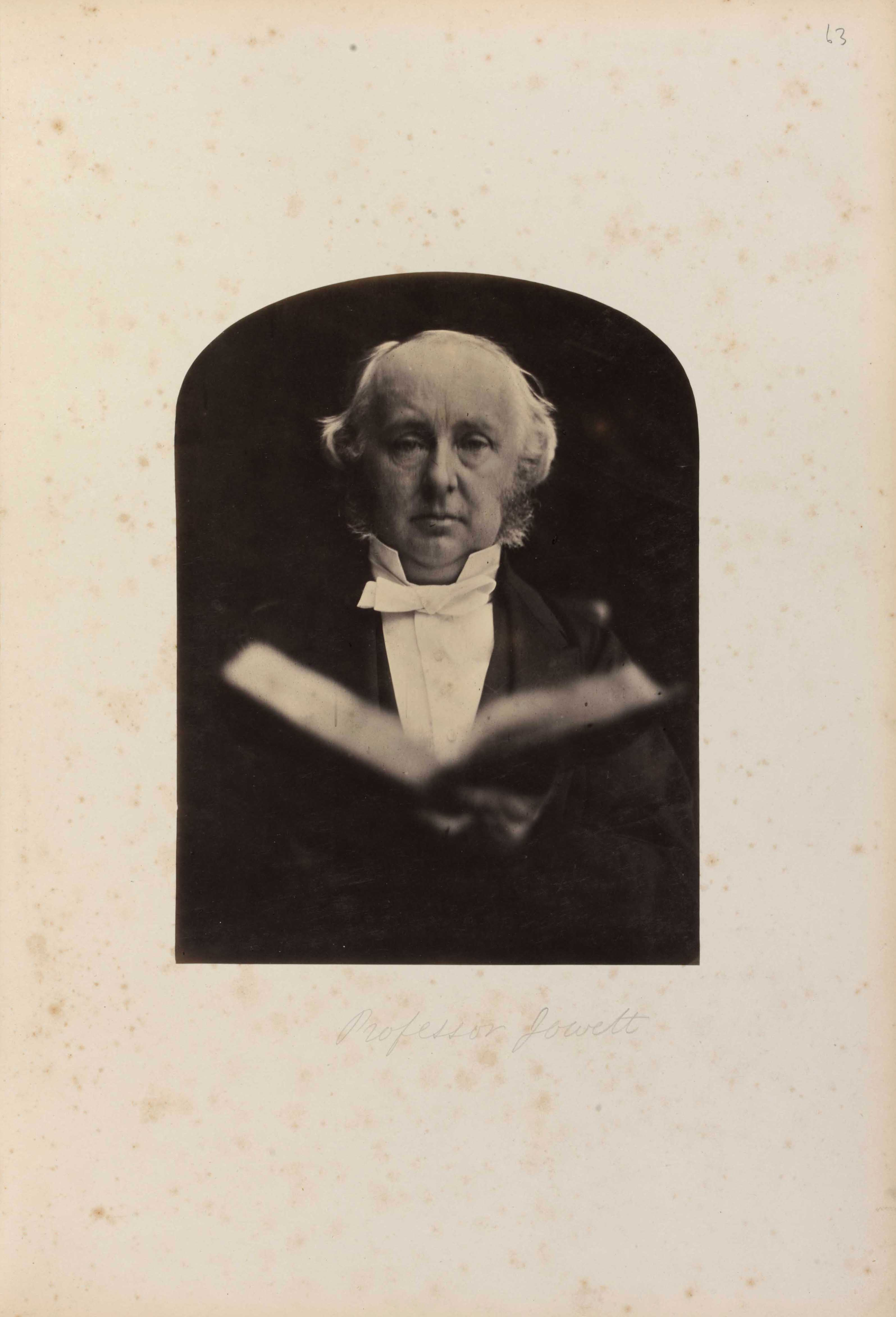
"Professor Jowett"

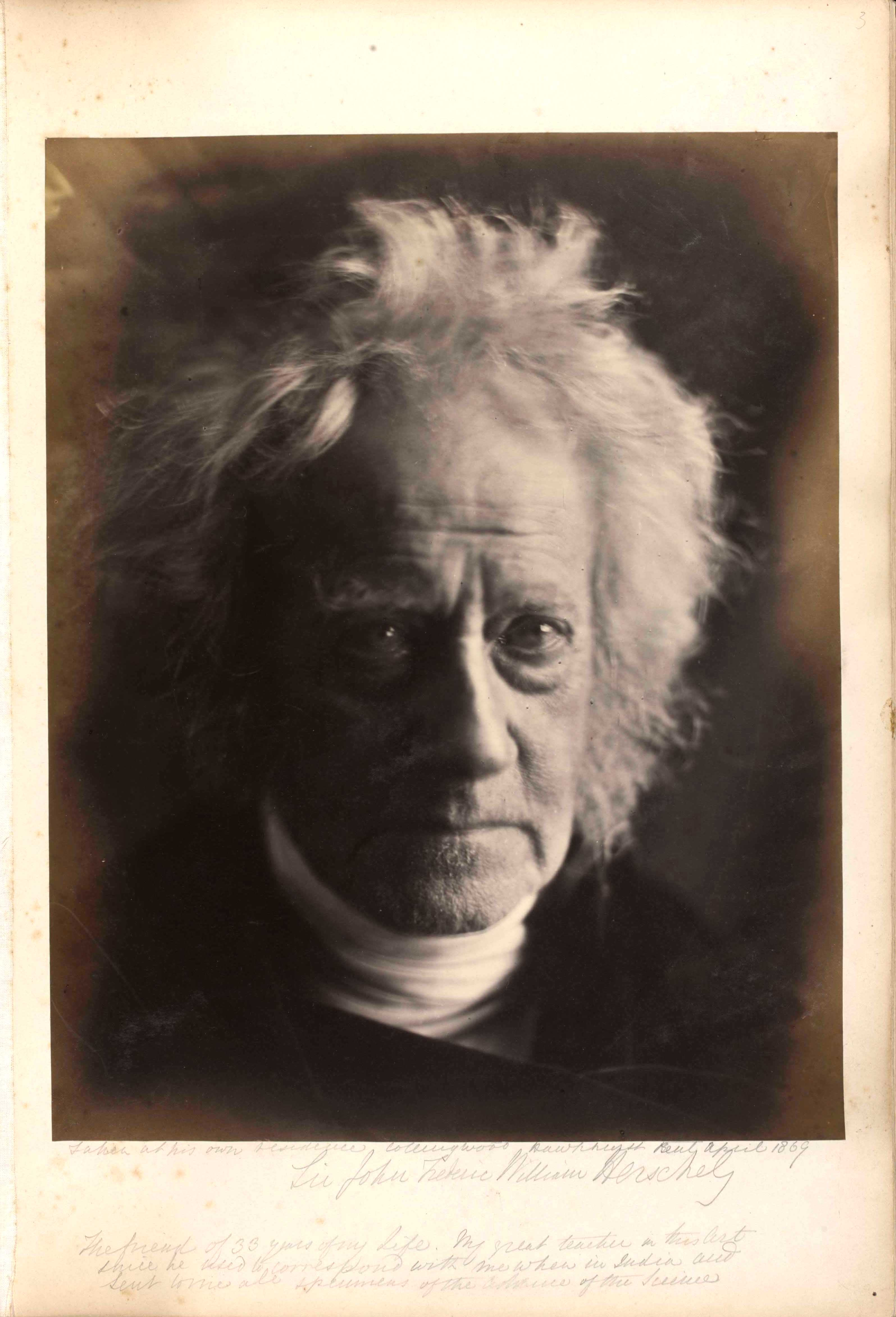
"Sir John Frederick William Herschel. April 1869"

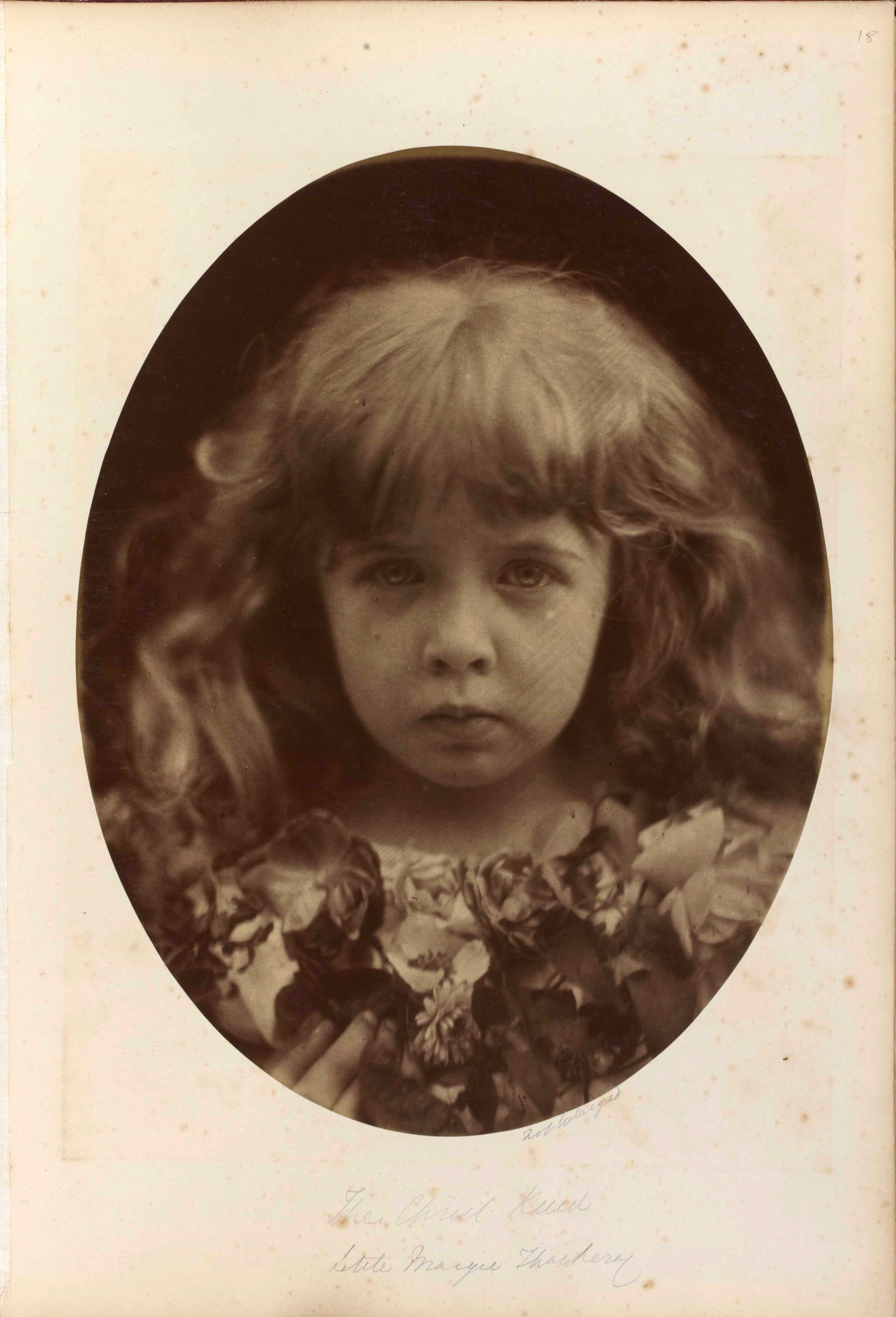
"The Christ kind little Margie Thackeray"

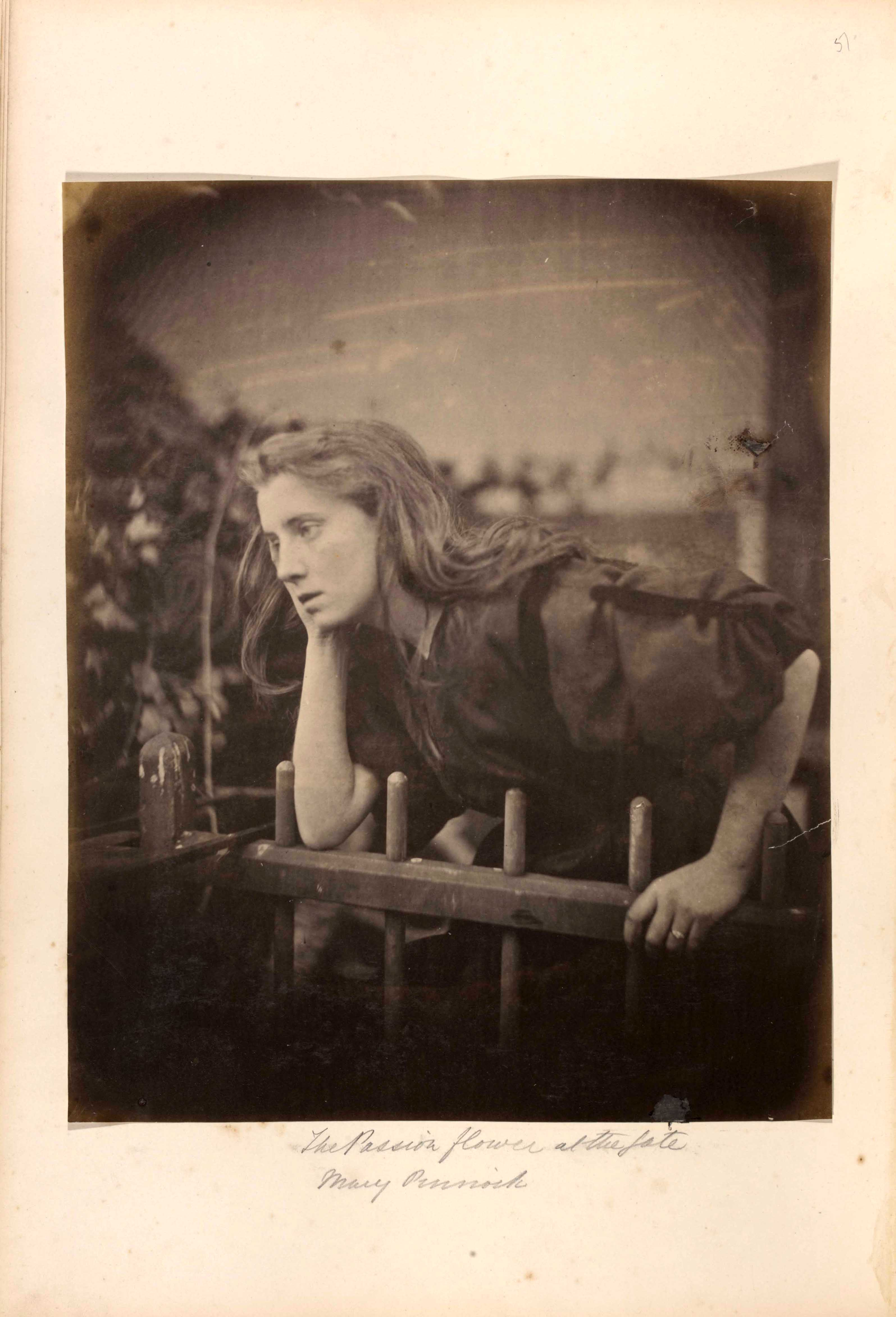
"The Passion Flower at the Gate"

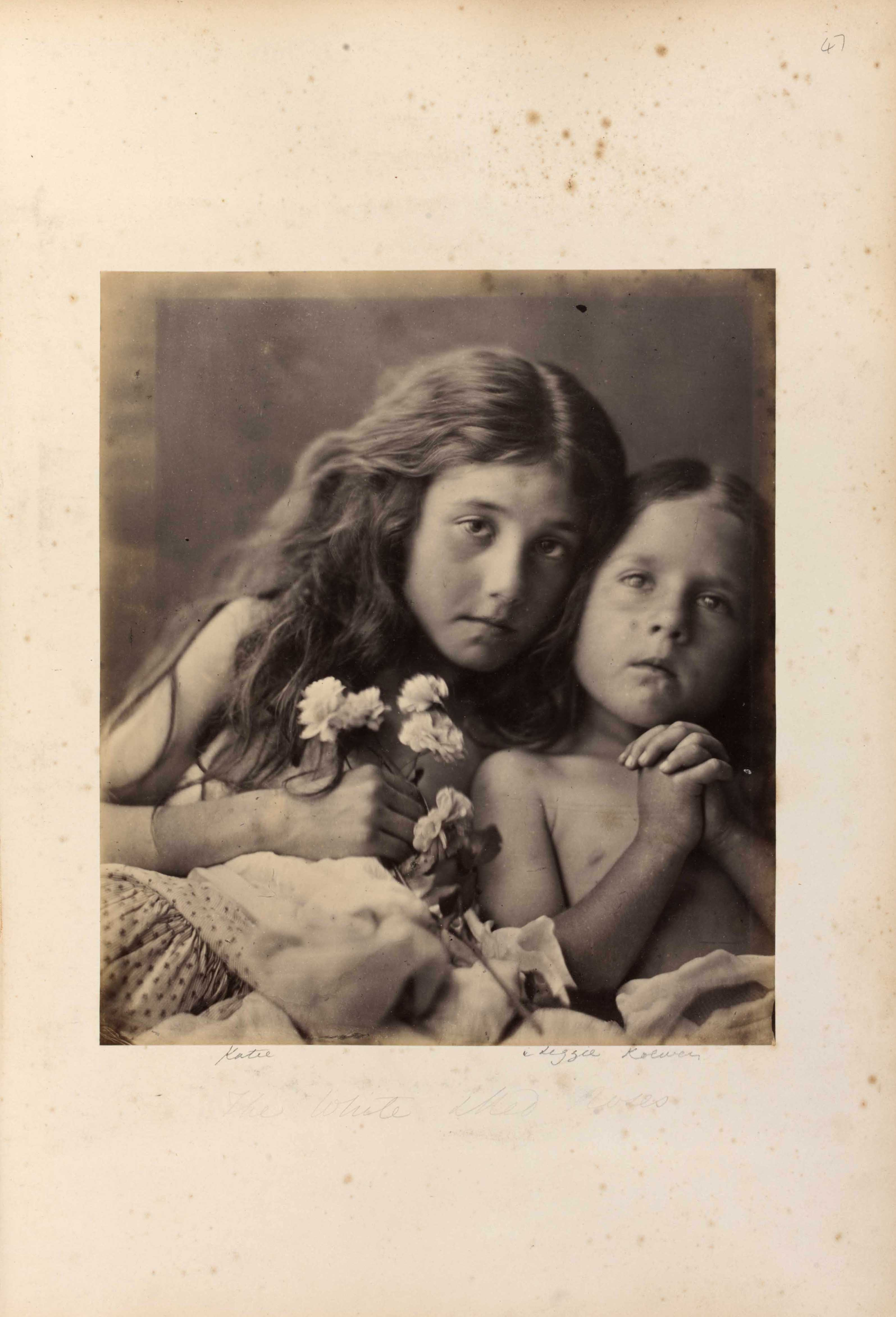
"The Red and White Roses"

== Bibliography ==
- Julia Margaret Cameron: The Complete Photographs, Julian Cox, Colin Ford. Getty Publications, 2003 ISBN 9780892366811
