= Maria Kinnaird =

British heiress and socialite (1810–1891)

- Born: 1810; St Vincent
- Died: 1891 (aged 80–81); Fredley, Mickleham, Surrey, England
- Resting place: Mickleham, Surrey
- Known for: Heiress, socialite
- Spouse: Thomas Drummond
- Children: three daughters

Maria Kinnaird (1810–1891), born on St. Vincent, was orphaned when La Soufrière erupted in 1812 and was later adopted by the politician Richard Sharp, known as "Conversation Sharp". Sharp was once considered possibly to be the most popular man in London of his time. Through her adoptive father, she inherited not only a considerable fortune but a wide network of influential friends and contacts, particularly among Whig circles. She became a prominent socialite and leading hostess in London during the mid-Victorian period and was described as being an accomplished, attractive, and intelligent woman. In 1835, she married Thomas Drummond, who developed the use of Drummond Light in surveying. She would be her husband's mainstay during his final years as Under-Secretary for Ireland (1835–1840).

== Biography ==
Maria was given every advantage, educationally, socially, and culturally and came to know many of the prominent artists, musicians, politicians, and socialites of the time. When her adoptive father died, she moved into a house in Hyde Park Gardens while maintaining the family retreat, Fredley, in Mickleham, Surrey.

As a teenager, she became friends with Dora Wordsworth. Some of the correspondence, resulting from their friendship which lasted until Dora's death, still exists. Maria is said to have possessed an exceptional singing voice of which William Wordsworth was particularly enamoured. Among her many friends were Sydney Smith, the artist J. M. W. Turner, John Russell, 1st Earl Russell, Professor Wheatstone, George Meredith, Charles Babbage, Michael Faraday, Austen Henry Layard, and Henry Petty-Fitzmaurice, 4th Marquess of Lansdowne, who were entertained by Maria at Hyde Park Gardens and at Fredley between the years 1843 and 1891. Her social circle was extensive and notable.

== Family life ==
At one time, there were rumours that Maria would marry the historian Thomas Macaulay. The son of Samuel Romilly was also thought to have been infatuated with her; but, in the end, she married army surveyor Thomas Drummond at Weston House, the impressive home of Sir George Philips, 1st Baronet. She became her husband's mainstay during a particularly stressful period—which eventually led to his death—when he successfully acted as Under-Secretary for Ireland (1835–1840).

Maria and Thomas had three daughters, Fanny, Mary (who became the wife of Joseph Kay), and Emily. In her declining years, it is said that Robert Browning frequently visited Maria at Fredley to read her some of his and his wife's poetry.

== Death ==
Maria died in 1891 and was buried in Mickleham churchyard. She left a self-portrait of Sir Joshua Reynolds to her daughter, Emily Drummond, who eventually gave it to the National Gallery in London. The painting had originally been purchased by Richard Sharp from Hester Thrale for just over £128 in 1816.

Her biography, Maria Drummond – A Sketch was written by the author/publisher, Charles Kegan Paul, at the request of two of her daughters.
