= Ida Ashworth Taylor =

Ida Alice Ashworth Taylor (1847–1929) was an English novelist and biographer.

Ida Taylor was the daughter of the playwright Henry Taylor and Alice Spring Rice, daughter of Thomas Spring Rice, 1st Baron Monteagle. A Catholic convert, Taylor wrote for periodicals including The Dublin Review and The Nineteenth Century. For most of her adult life she lived with her younger sister, Una, in Montpelier Square in London. The pair "conducted a literary salon, of which the characteristic notes were intellectual interest and Irish warm-heartedness".

She died at her home in Wootton Wood in the New Forest.

== Works ==
=== Novels ===
- Venus's Doves, 3 vols., London: Hurst and Blackett, 1884
- Snow in Harvest, 3 vols., London, 1885
- Allegiance: a Novel, 2 vols., London: R. Bentley, 1886
- (with U. Ashworth Taylor, her sister) A Social Heretic, London: Hurst and Blackett, 1889
- Vice Valentine, London: Ward and Downey, 1890

=== Non-fiction ===
- (ed. and abridged) The life of Queen Elizabeth by Agnes Strickland, 1900.
- The Silver Legend: Saints for Children, St. Louis: B. Herder, 1902.
- Life of Sir Walter Raleigh, London: Methuen, 1902.
- The life of Lord Edward Fitzgerald, 1763-1798, London: Hutchinson & Co., 1903.
- Revolutionary types, London: Duckworth and Co., 1904. With an introduction by R. B. Cunninghame Graham.
- The life of Queen Henrietta Maria, London: Hutchinson & Co., 1905.
- Queen Hortense and her friends, 1783-1837, London: Hutchinson, 1907. 2 vols.
- Lady Jane Grey and Her Times, London: Hutchinson, 1908.
- The cardinal democrat, Henry Edward Manning, London: Kegan Paul, Trench, Trübner, 1908.
- (ed.) The maxims of Madame Swetchine, London: Burns & Oates, 1908.
- Robert Southwell, S.J.: priest and poet, London: Sands, 1908.
- Christina of Sweden, London: Hutchinson, 1909.
- The making of a king, London: Hutchinson & Co., 1910.
- Life of Madame Roland, 1911.
- The life of James IV, London: Hutchinson & Co., 1913. With an introduction by Sir George Douglas, Bart.
- The tragedy of an army: La Vendée in 1793, London: Hutchinson & Co., 1913.
- Joan of Arc; soldier and saint, Edinburgh: Sands & Co., 1920.
