= Hyde Park Gardens Mews =

Mews street in the City of Westminster, London, England

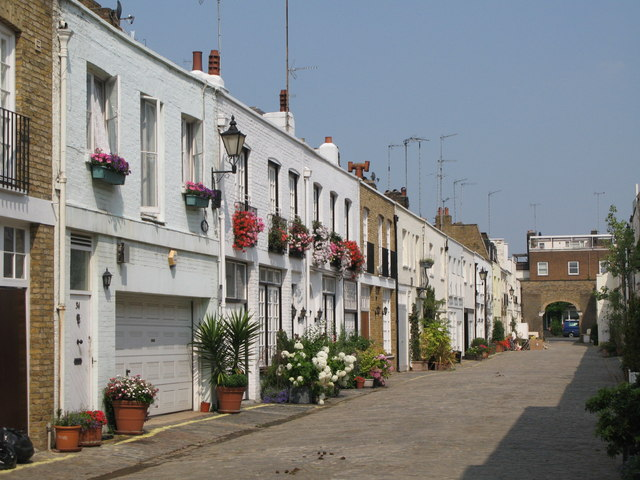
- Hyde Park Gardens Mews in July 2009

- Location within Greater London
- 51°30′47″N 0°10′14″W

History
- Built: c. 1836–40

Listed Building – Grade II
- Official name: 9, Clarendon Place W2, 48, Hyde Park Gardens Mews W2, 14A, Hyde Park Gardens Mews W2, 1-21, Hyde Park Gardens Mews W2
- Designated: 10 April 1975
- Reference no.: 1278095

Hyde Park Gardens Mews is a mews street in the Tyburnia area of London, W2. The mews consists of 46 residential properties, originally built as stables for Hyde Park Gardens, on a cobbled road with two entrances. The west entrance passes under an archway. The mews is entered by Clarendon Place at the west and Stanhope Terrace to the east. Sussex Place bisects the mews in the middle.

Nos. 1–21, 14A, and 48 Hyde Park Gardens Mews are listed Grade II on the National Heritage List for England in a group with 9 Clarendon Place. The mews is believed to have been designed by John Crake, built from 1836 to 1840 in conjunction with his Hyde Park Gardens development.

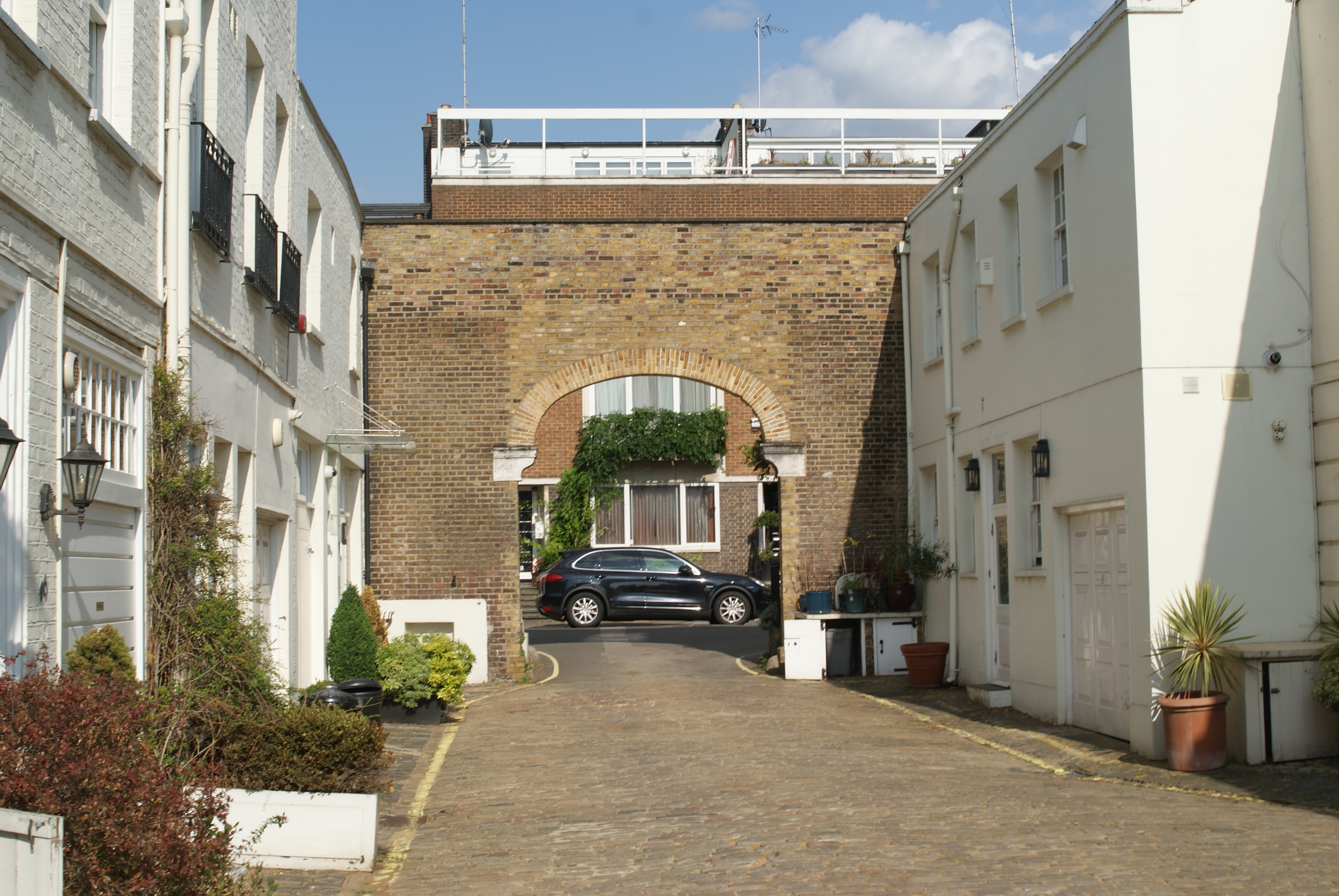
The archway entrance to Clarendon Place from the mews in August 2014

Bridget Cherry, writing in the 1991 London: North West edition of the Pevsner Architectural Guides, describes the mews as the "most extensive survival" of the "original service buildings to support such grand establishments".

The corner of Hyde Park Gardens Mews and Sussex Place features in the 1955 film Lost with David Farrar and a scene in the 1961 film No Love for Johnnie with Peter Finch and Mary Peach.
