= Yvonne Hackenbroch =

British museum curator and historian

- Born: Yvonne Alix Hackenbroch; April 27, 1912; Frankfurt am Main, German Empire
- Died: September 7, 2012 (aged 100); Hyde Park Gardens, London, England
- Education: LMU Munich (Undergraduate degree, PhD)
- Occupations: Museum curator; jewellery historian
- Notable work: Renaissance Jewellery
- Parents: Zacharias Max Hackenbroch (father); Clementine Hackenbroch (mother)

Yvonne Alix Hackenbroch (27 April 1912 – 7 September 2012), was a British museum curator and historian of jewellery.

== Early life ==
Yvonne Alix Hackenbroch was born in Frankfurt am Main, Germany, on 27 April 1912, the second of three daughters of the art dealer Zacharias Max Hackenbroch (1884–1937) and his wife, Clementine Hackenbroch, née Schwarzschild (1888–1984), a descendant of art dealer Selig Goldschmidt. Whilst still a child, Hackenbroch was fluent in French, English, German, and Italian.

Hackenbroch was educated at the Ludwig-Maximilians-Universität München, and earned an undergraduate degree and a doctorate, both in the history of art. She was the last Jew to earn a PhD there before the Second World War, in December 1936.

== Career ==
On arriving in London, Hackenbroch soon joined the staff at the British Museum, and was one of those who excavated and catalogued the Sutton Hoo treasure. She was the jewellery adviser to the 1944 film of Henry V, starring Laurence Olivier.

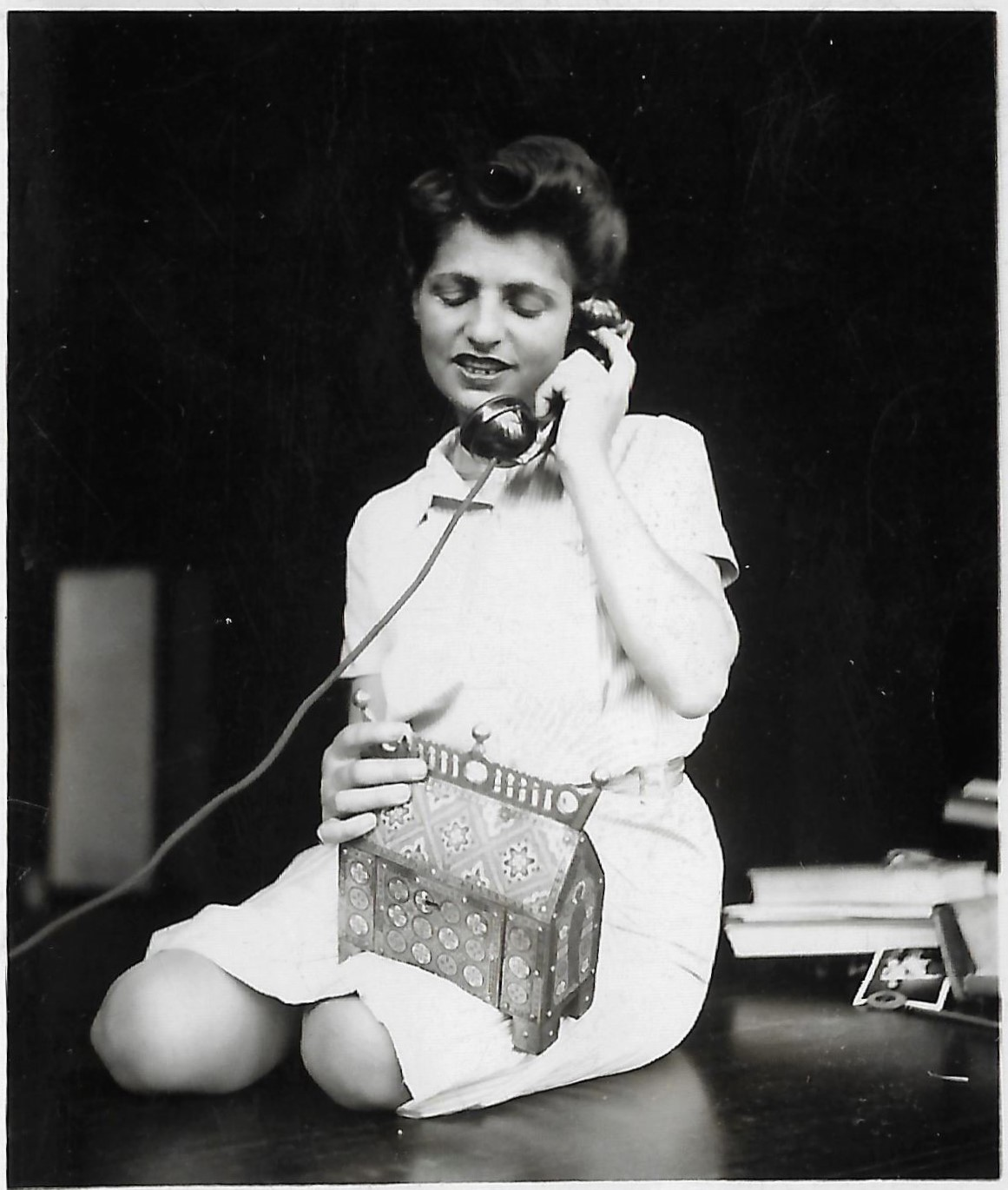
Hackenbroch holding a 13th century Reliquary while cataloguing the Lee Collection

From 1946 to 1949, Hackenbroch was based in Toronto, Canada, at the behest of the UK government, to provide expert advice on the Lee Collection of Renaissance art given to Canada by Arthur Lee, 1st Viscount Lee of Fareham, to thank the country for its World War II support.

In about 1949, she moved to the Metropolitan Museum of Art in New York to catalogue the "immense art collection" of Irwin Untermyer. This led to Hackenbroch and Thames & Hudson publishing seven books, covering antique silver, bronze, porcelain, needlework and furniture. She joined the Metropolitan Museum of Art as a curator, specialising in Renaissance Art, and eventually became an American citizen.

== Personal life ==
Hackenbroch never married. She died on 7 September 2012, in her flat at 31 Hyde Park Gardens, Bayswater, London, four months after celebrating her 100th birthday.

== Selected publications ==
- Renaissance Jewellery (1979)
