= Edward Quillinan =

English poet (1791–1851)

- Born: 12 August 1791; Oporto, Portugal
- Died: 8 July 1851 (aged 59); Ambleside, Cumbria, England
- Occupations: Poet, translator
- Spouse(s): Jemima (m. 1817; died 1822) Dora Wordsworth (m. 1841; died 1847)
- Children: 2

Edward Quillinan (12 August 1791 – 8 July 1851) was an English poet who was a son-in-law and defender of William Wordsworth and a translator of Portuguese poetry.

== Early life ==
Quillinan was born in Oporto, Portugal, on 12 August 1791 to John Quillinan and Julia Ryan. His father was an Irishman of a good but impoverished family who had become a prosperous wine merchant at Oporto. In 1798, the younger Quillinan left Portugal to be educated at Roman Catholic schools in England; his mother died soon after. After returning to Portugal, Quillinan worked in his father's counting-house, but this arrangement ceased upon the Invasion of Portugal under Jean-Andoche Junot in 1807, which obliged the family to seek refuge in England.

== Military service and early works ==
After spending some time without any occupation, Quillinan enlisted in the army as a cornet in a cavalry regiment stationed at Walcheren. Some time afterwards, he passed into another regiment, stationed at Canterbury. A satirical pamphlet in verse, The Ball Room Votaries, involved him in a series of duels, and compelled him to exchange into the 3rd Dragoon Guards, with which he served through the latter portion of the Peninsular War. In 1814 he made his first serious essay in poetry by publishing Dunluce Castle, a Poem, which he followed with Stanzas by the author of Dunluce Castle (1814), and The Sacrifice of Isabel (a more important effort in 1816), and Elegiac Verses (1817), addressed to Lady Brydges in memory of her son, Grey Matthew Brydges.

In 1817 he married Jemima, second daughter of Sir Samuel Egerton Brydges and subsequently served with his regiment in Ireland. In 1819 Dunluce Castle attracted the notice of Thomas Hamilton the original "Morgan O'Doherty" of Blackwood's Magazine, who ridiculed it in a review entitled Poems by a Heavy Dragoon. Quillinan deferred his rejoinder until 1821, when he attacked John Wilson and John Gibson Lockhart, whom he erroneously supposed to be the writers, in his Retort Courteous, a satire largely consisting of passages from Peter's Letters to his Kinsfolk, done into verse. The misunderstanding was dissipated through the friendly offices of Robert Pearse Gillies, and all parties became good friends.

== Later career ==
In 1821 Quillinan retired from the army, and settled at Spring Cottage, between Rydal and Ambleside, and thus in the immediate neighbourhood of Wordsworth, whose poetry he had long devotedly admired. Scarcely was he established there when a tragic fate overtook his wife, who died from the effects of burns, 25 May 1822, leaving two daughters. Wordsworth was godfather of the younger daughter, and he wrote an epitaph on Mrs. Quillinan. Distracted with grief, Quillinan fled to the continent, and afterwards lived alternately in London, Paris, Portugal, and Canterbury, until 1841, when he married Wordsworth's daughter, Dora Wordsworth. The union encountered strong opposition on Wordsworth's part, not from dislike of Quillinan, but from dread of losing his daughter's society. He eventually submitted with a good grace, due to the persuasion of Isabella Fenwick, and became fully reconciled to Quillinan, who proved an excellent husband and son-in-law. In 1841 Quillinan published The Conspirators, a three-volume novel, embodying his recollections of military service in Spain and Portugal. In 1843 he appeared in Blackwood as the defender of Wordsworth against Walter Savage Landor, who had attacked his poetry in an imaginary conversation with Richard Porson, published in the magazine. Quillinan's reply was a cento of all the harsh pronouncements of the erratic critic respecting great poets, and the effect was to invalidate as a whole criticisms that might have been defensible individually. Landor dismissed his remarks as "Quill-inanities;" Wordsworth himself is said to have regarded the defence as indiscreet.

In 1845 the delicate health of his wife induced Quillinan to travel with her for a year in Portugal and Spain, and the excursion produced a charming book from her pen. In 1846 he contributed an extremely valuable article to the Quarterly Review on Gil Vicente, the Portuguese dramatic poet. In 1847 Dora died, and four years later (8 July 1851) Quillinan himself died (at Loughrig Holme, Ambleside) of inflammation, occasioned by taking cold upon a fishing excursion; he was buried in Grasmere churchyard. His latter years had been chiefly employed in translations of Luís de Camões' Lusiad, five books of which were completed, and of Alexandre Herculano's History of Portugal. The latter, also left imperfect, was never printed; the Lusiad was published in 1853 by John Adamson, another translator of Camoens. A selection from Quillinan's original poems, principally lyrical, with a memoir, was published in the same year by William Johnston, the editor of Wordsworth.

== Assessment ==
Quillinan was a sensitive, irritable, but most estimable man. "All who know him," says Southey, writing in 1830, "are very much attached to him." "Nowhere," says Johnston, speaking of his correspondence during his wife's hopeless illness, "has the writer of this memoir ever seen letters more distinctly marked by manly sense, combined with almost feminine tenderness." Matthew Arnold in his Stanzas in Memory of Edward Quillinan, speaks of him as "a man unspoil'd, sweet, generous, and humane." As an original poet his claims are of the slenderest; his poems would hardly have been preserved but for the regard due to his personal character and his relationship to Wordsworth. His version of the Lusiad, nevertheless, though wanting his final corrections, has considerable merit, and he might have rendered important service to two countries if he had devoted his life to the translation and illustration of Portuguese literature.
