= Isabella Fenwick =

19th-century British amanuensis (secretary)

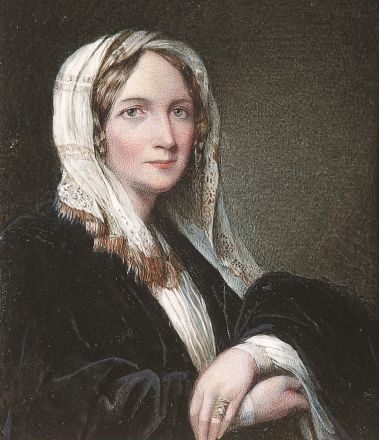
- Margaret Gillies' portrait of Fenwick
- Born: 1783
- Died: 1856 (aged 72–73)
- Burial place: Lansdown Cemetery, Somerset
- Occupation: Amanuensis
- Parents: Nicholas Fenwick; Dorothy Fenwick

Isabella Fenwick (1783 – 1856) was a 19th-century British amanuensis (secretary), and a confidante, advisor, and friend of William Wordsworth and his family in his later years. She is the scribe behind the Fenwick Notes, an autobiographical and poetic commentary Wordsworth dictated to her over a six-month period between January and June 1843. Her friendship inspired Wordsworth to write "On a Portrait of I.F., painted by Margaret Gillies" and "To I.F."—a sonnet in which he calls her "The star which comes at close of day to shine," a reference to their bond formed late in life.

== Biography ==
Isabella Fenwick was born in 1783. She was the daughter of Nicholas Fenwick of Lemmington Hall, and Dorothy (Forster) Fenwick.

Fenwick met William Wordsworth when she was in her late forties. She first signed the visitor's book at the Wordsworth family home, Rydal Mount, in June 1831, though it is likely that she was acquainted with the family beforehand through her cousin, the dramatist Henry Taylor. When she moved to Ambleside in 1838, the friendship between Fenwick and the Wordsworths blossomed. "There are very few days that I do not see the poet for an hour or two," she wrote in January 1839.

At first, Fenwick was in awe of the poet—"I would be content to be a servant in his house to hear his wisdom," she said upon first meeting him. The admiration soon became mutual: When William and Mary Wordsworth (née Hutchinson) went to stay with her for the month of February 1839, William said it was "for the sake of her society and change of air—and above all, because it may not be prudent for me to walk to see her so often as I could wish." Fenwick's companionship may have helped fill the void left by his sister Dorothy Wordsworth, who was by this point incapacitated by mental illness.

Fenwick was equally beloved by the women of the Wordsworth household. Mary Wordsworth "attached herself to Miss Fenwick with a warmth and energy of nature which took no account of years," wrote Henry Taylor. When William opposed the marriage between his daughter Dora and Edward Quillinan, it was Fenwick who convinced him to relent.

Fenwick is buried in Lansdown Cemetery in Somerset.

== Fenwick Notes ==
While editing The Prelude and preparing it for posthumous publication, Wordsworth spent a lot of time thinking about his poetic reception after his death. At the urging of Fenwick and his daughter Dora, Wordsworth decided to set down the biographical details surrounding the composition of many of his poems. He dictated the notes to Fenwick between January and June 1843. When he and Fenwick finished, Dora and her husband made a fair copy in a leather-bound notebook—the document scholars now refer to as the Fenwick Notes. None of Fenwick's original transcription of the dictated notes survives.
