= Henry Taylor (dramatist) =

English playwright and poet

Sir Henry Taylor KCMG
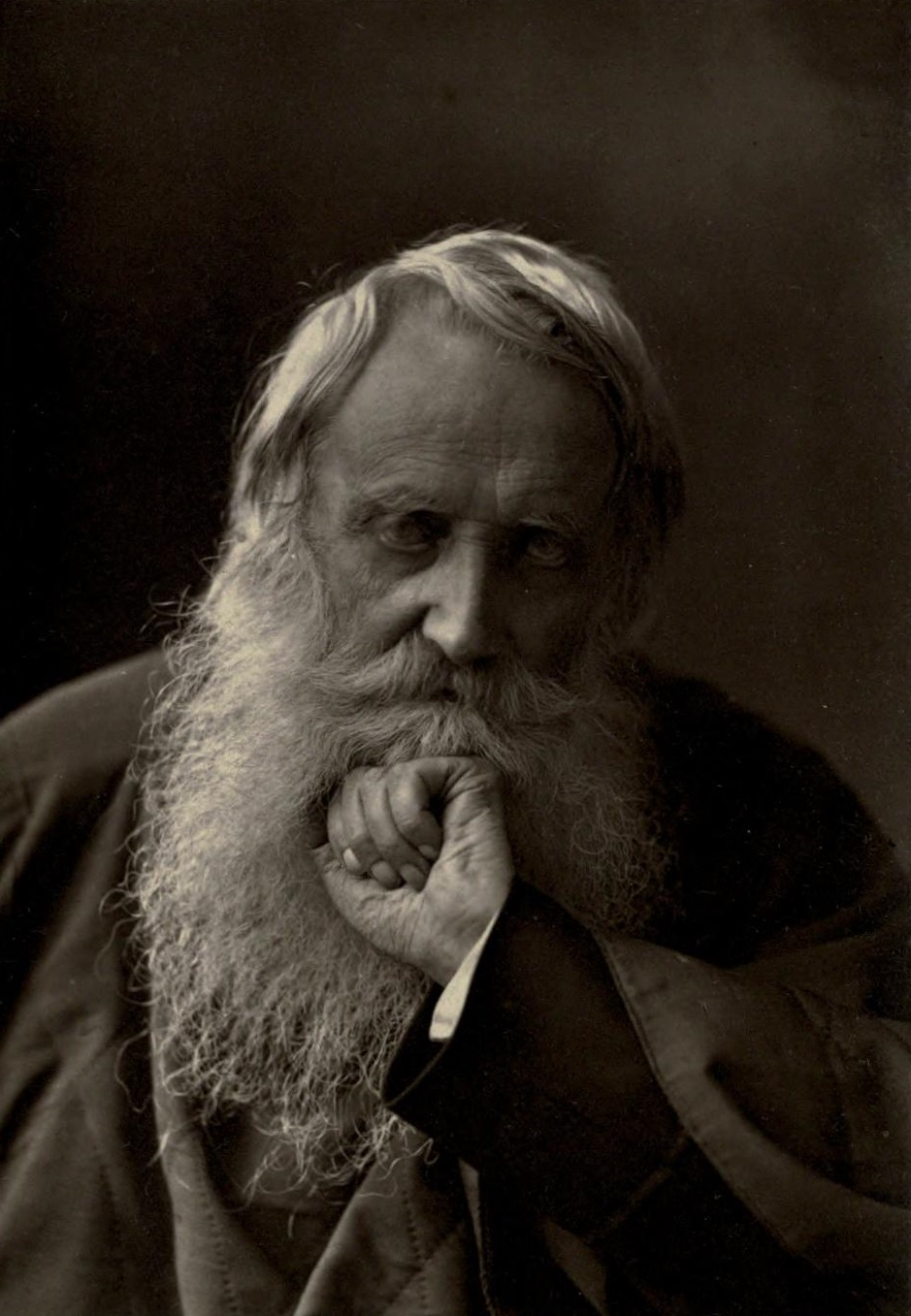
- Sir Henry Taylor, by W. J. Hawker.
- Born: 18 October 1800; Bishop Middleham, England
- Died: 27 March 1886 (aged 85)
- Occupations: Dramatist and poet
- Spouse: The Honorable Theodosia Alice Spring Rice
- Children: Five: including Ida Alice Ashworth Taylor, Eleanor Ashworth Towle, and Una Ashworth Taylor
- Writing career
- Language: English

Sir Henry Taylor KCMG (18 October 1800 – 27 March 1886) was an English dramatist and poet and Colonial Office official.

== Early life ==
Henry Taylor was born on 18 October 1800 in Bishop Middleham. He was the third son of George Taylor Sr and Eleanor Ashworth, who died when he was an infant. His father remarried Jane Mills in 1818, and the family then moved to Witton-le-Wear. George Taylor Sr's friend Charles Arbuthnot found vocational positions in London for Henry Taylor and his elder brother, George Taylor Jr. In 1817, the pair along with their second brother, William, a medical student, went to London. Soon afterwards, all three siblings contracted typhus fever, and both his brothers died within a fortnight.

Following this tragedy, Henry Taylor then accepted work in the Colonial administration of Barbados. Taylor's place in Barbados was abolished in 1820, subsequent to which he returned to his father's house.

== Colonial Office career ==
Taylor obtained a clerkship in the Colonial Office, where he subsequently worked from 1824 until 1872 under Sir Henry Holland, 1st Baronet and Robert William Hay, to whom he was Permanent Secretary.

In 1828, Taylor succeeded to the office of the West Indies expert Colonel Thomas Moody ADC Kt., of whom James Stephen had been the protégé. During the 1830s, Taylor and Stephen endorsed the abolitionist contentions of Viscount Howick, as a consequence of which Stephen replaced Hay.

Taylor was appointed a Knight Commander of the Order of St Michael and St George (KCMG) in the 1869 Birthday Honours.

Taylor died on 27 March 1886.

== Literary connections ==
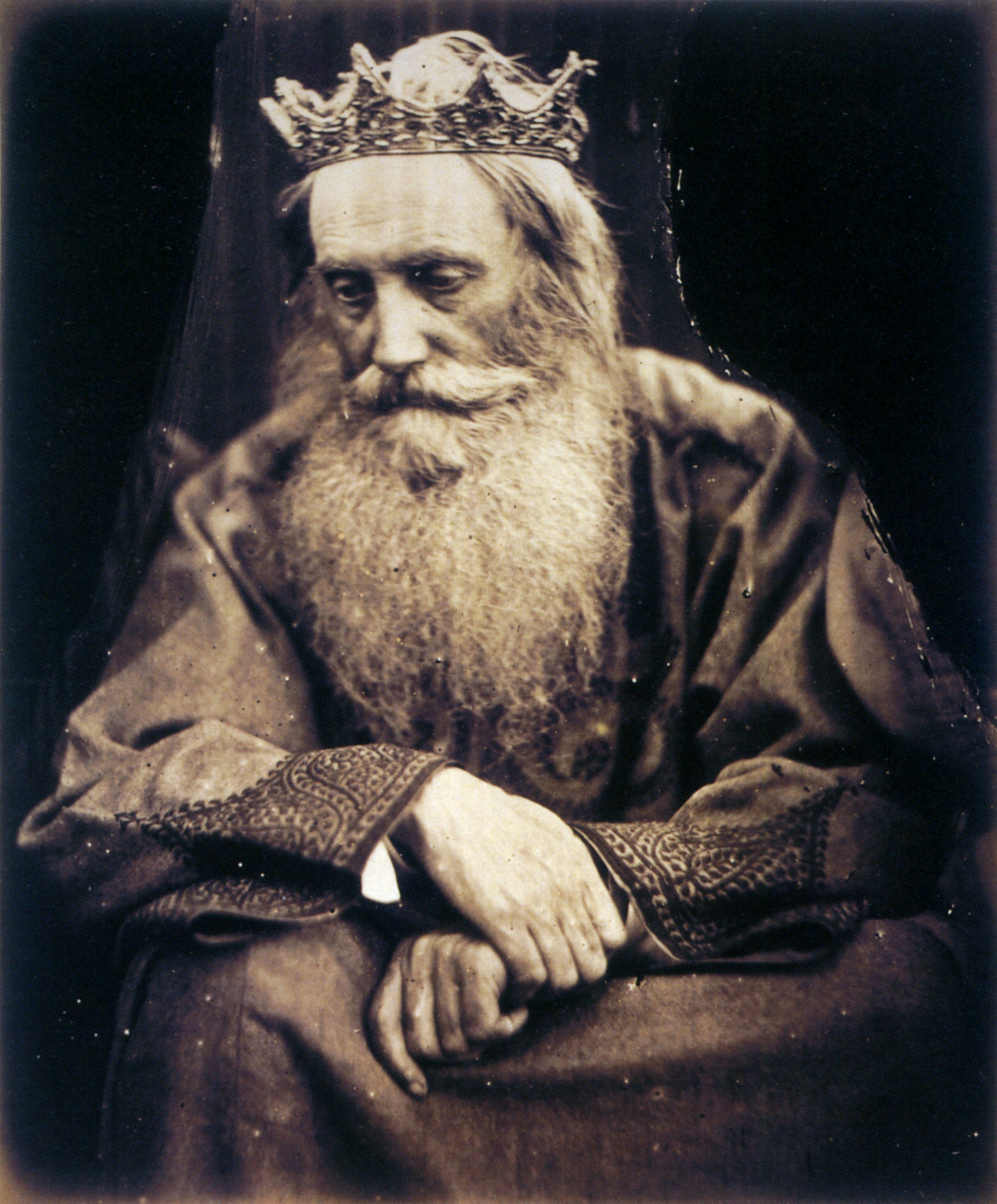
Study of King David, by Julia Margaret Cameron. King David is depicted by Sir Henry Taylor, 1866

Taylor wrote Byronic poems and an article on Thomas Moore, which in 1822 was accepted for the Quarterly Review by William Gifford. Returning to London in October 1823, he found that Gifford had printed another article of his, on Lord John Russell. Taylor had also contributed to the London Magazine, and had an offer of the editorship.

His father George was a friend of William Wordsworth. In 1823, on a visit to the Lake District, Henry Taylor made the acquaintance of Robert Southey, and they became friends. Jane Taylor had a first cousin, Isabella Fenwick (1783–1856), whom he introduced to the Wordsworth family. She became a close friend of Wordsworth in later life, as she had been of Taylor up to the time of his marriage. Though Fenwick was not herself a writer, her friendship left an enduring impression on the writings of Taylor and Wordsworth. In his autobiography, Henry Taylor wrote, “There is a good deal of her mind in my writings. I wish there was more; and I wish that she had left her thoughts behind her in writings of her own.”

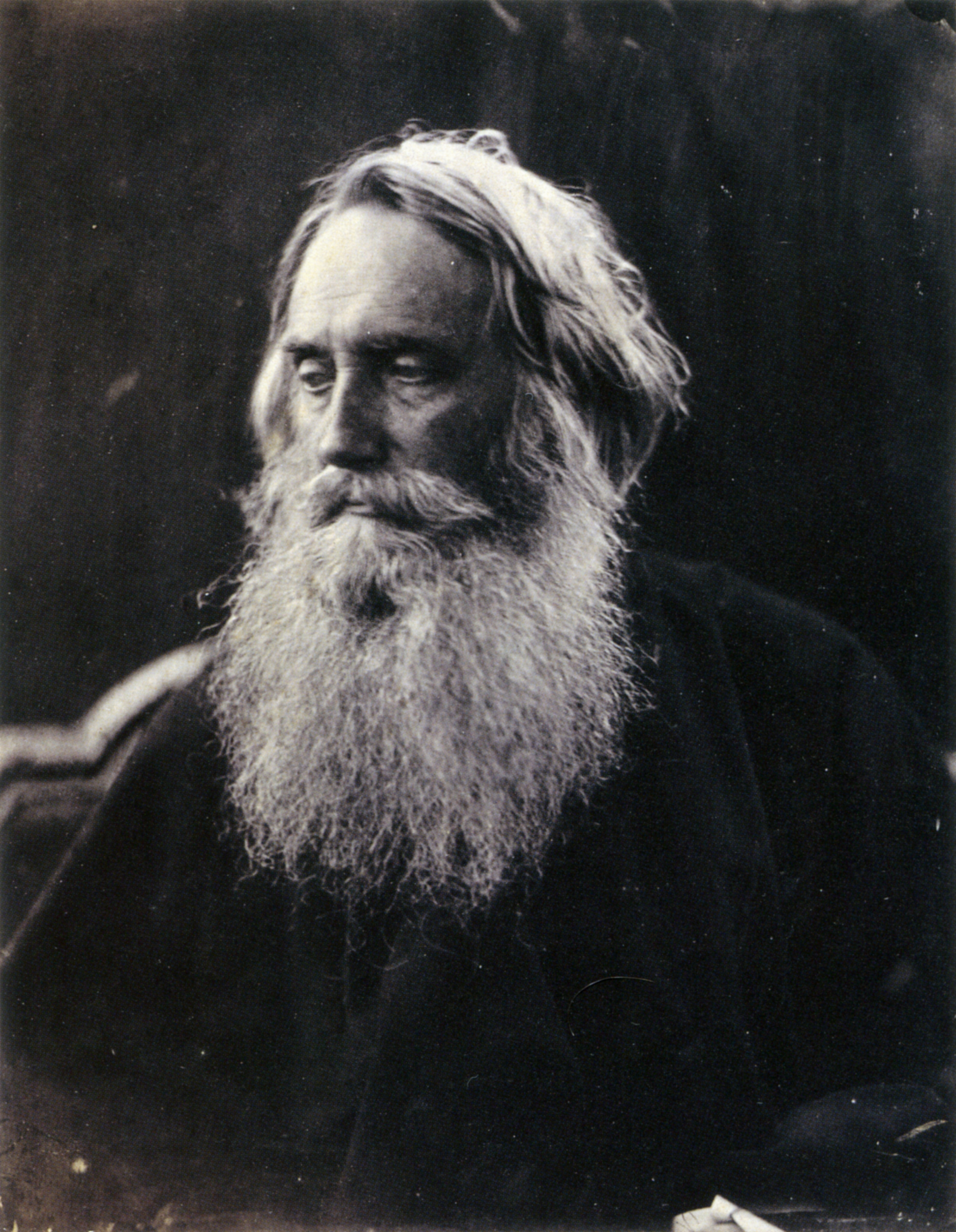
Henry Taylor, photographed by Julia Margaret Cameron, for whom he was a regular sitter. The beard was grown after illness made him wary of shaving himself. Millais wished (in vain) to have Taylor model for him as Moses.

Taylor's work also brought him literary friends: the circle of Thomas Hyde Villiers, and his colleague James Stephen. Through Villiers he became acquainted with Charles Austin, John Stuart Mill, and some of the Benthamites. He made speeches in opposition to their views, in the debating society documented by Mill. He also invited them to personal meetings with Wordsworth and Southey. Mill introduced Taylor to Thomas Carlyle in November 1831, initiating a long friendship. Carlyle's opinion of the "marked veracity" of Taylor was printed wrongly by the editor James Anthony Froude as "morbid vivacity". He also knew John Sterling, and made the acquaintance of Fanny Trollope whilst attending the court of Louis Philippe of France.

Taylor aspired to become the official biographer of Southey. The family row over Southey's second marriage, to Caroline Anne Bowles, found him with the Wordsworths and others hostile to Bowles. He did become Southey's literary executor.

== Works ==
In Witton, Taylor wrote The Cave of Ceada which was accepted for the Quarterly Review. Taylor wrote a number of plays, including Isaac Comnenus (1827), and Philip van Artevelde (1834). This latter brought him fame and elicited comparisons with Shakespeare. In 1845 there followed a book of lyrical poems. His essay The Statesman (1836) caused some controversy, as a "supposedly" satirical view of how the civil service worked.

Taylor published his Autobiography in 1885, which contains portraits of Wordsworth, Southey, Tennyson and Walter Scott. In it, on his own account, he gave Richard Whately's opinion of him as a "resuscitated Bacon", who had better things to do than write verse (which could be left to women).

His poem Edwin the Fair depicted Charles Elliot as Earl Athulf. Thomas Frederick Elliot, Charles's brother, was a Colonial Office colleague.

== Literary reputation ==
In his own time, Taylor was highly esteemed as a poet and dramatist. For example, J.G. Lockhart claimed that Philip Van Artevelde secured Taylor "a place among the real artists of his time", and, as late as 1868, J.H. Stirling ranked Philip higher than anything produced by Robert Browning.

Modern literary historians, however, tend to overlook Taylor's accomplishments in verse and drama and emphasize his importance as a literary critic, pointing out that he was a strong advocate for stylistic simplicity, subject matter rooted in common life, and intellectual discipline in poetic composition, placing special importance on clear and reasoned structure.

== Marriage and family ==
Taylor married Hon. Theodosia Alice Spring Rice, daughter of Thomas Spring Rice, 1st Baron Monteagle of Brandon, on 17 October 1839. They had five children, including the biographer Ida Alice Ashworth Taylor and the novelists Eleanor Ashworth Towle and Una Ashworth Taylor.

== Sources ==
- This article incorporates text from a publication now in the public domain: "Taylor, Henry (1800-1886)". Dictionary of National Biography. London: Smith, Elder & Co. 1885–1900.

== Selected bibliography ==
=== Plays ===
- Taylor, Henry (1827). Isaac Comnenus. London: John Murray. OCLC 707078180.
- Taylor, Henry (1850). The virgin widow. London: Longman, Brown, Green, and Longmans. OCLC 774388.
- Taylor, Henry (1862). St. Clement's eve. London: Chapman and Hall. OCLC 4790189.
- Taylor, Henry (1863). Philip van Artevelde. London: Boston, Ticknor and Fields. OCLC 405182.

=== Poems ===
- Taylor, Henry (1842). Edwin the Fair. London: John Murray. OCLC 4790134.
- Taylor, Henry (1864). The poetical works of Henry Taylor. London: Chapman and Hall. OCLC 1878181.
- Taylor, Henry (1992) [1878]. The works. Cambridge, England: Chadwyck-Healey. OCLC 60518022.

=== Chapters in books ===
- Taylor, Henry (1991), "Sir Henry Taylor (1800–86): On secrecy", in Gross, John J. (ed.), The Oxford book of essays, Oxford England New York: Oxford University Press, ISBN 9780192141859.
  - Also available as: Taylor, Henry (1836), "On secrecy", in Taylor, Henry (ed.), The statesman, London: Longman, Rees, Orme, Brown, Green, & Longman, pp. 128–131, OCLC 4790233. Preview.

=== Essays ===
- Taylor, Henry (October 1822). "654: Article 6. Moore's Irish Melodies". Quarterly Review. 28 (55). John Murray II: 139–144. Archived from the original on 2 April 2015. With an Appendix containing the original Advertisements, and the Prefatory Letter on Music.
- Taylor, Henry; Gifford, William (July 1823). "687: Article 4. Lord John Russell, Don Carlos, or Persecution; a Tragedy, in Five Acts". Quarterly Review. 29 (58). John Murray II: 370–382. Archived from the original on 2 April 2015.
- Taylor, Henry (1992) [1836]. Schaefer, David Lewis; Schaefer, Roberta R. (eds.). The statesman. Westport, Connecticut: Praeger. ISBN 9780275944032.
  - Originally published as: Taylor, Henry (1836). The statesman. London: Longman, Rees, Orme, Brown, Green, & Longman. OCLC 4790233. Preview.
- Taylor, Henry (1847). Notes from life in six essays. London: John Murray. OCLC 1112226. Available online.
  - Money / Humility & independence / Wisdom / Choice in marriage / Children / The life poetic
- Mazzeo, Tilar J. (2007), ""The slip-shod muse": Byron, originality, and aesthetic plagiarism", in Mazzeo, Tilar J. (ed.), Plagiarism and literary property in the Romantic period, Philadelphia: University of Pennsylvania Press, pp. 94–104, ISBN 9780812202731, "... Byron's most extended engagement with questions of plagiarism occurs in Childe Harold's Pilgrimage, canto 3. The third canto of the poem was published in November of 1816, and by 1817 semi-public allegations of plagiarism were being circulated by Wordsworth. These charges were later made publicly in an 1823 essay, written by Wordsworth's friend Henry Taylor for The London Magazine..."
  - Wordsworth's letter to Henry Taylor regarding the essay: Wordsworth, William (1969) [1907], "CCCLXXXIX William Wordsworth to Henry Taylor: Rydal Mount, December 26th, [1823.]", Letters of the Wordsworth family, from 1787 to 1855 Vol. 3 1833-1855, by Wordsworth, William; Wordsworth, Dorothy, Knight, William Angus (ed.), New York, New York: Haskell House Publishing, pp. 211–213, OCLC 255149323, "...he [Byron] deserves the severe chastisement which you, or some one else, will undoubtedly one day give him, and may have done already, as I see by advertisement the subject has been treated in the London Magazine"
  - The essay: Taylor, Henry (December 1832). "Recent poetical plagiarisms and imitations". The London Magazine. VIII (6). Baldwin, Craddock & Joy: 597–604. "Mr. Coleridge has not suffered by this, and the plagiarism has availed nothing to Lord Byron, because it is obvious and unqualified; and therefore, by every reader acquainted with poetry, it is appropriated to its author"
