= Richard Sharp (politician) =

English banker and MP, 1759–1835

"Conversation" Sharp
- Born: 1759; Newfoundland
- Died: 30 March 1835 (aged 75–76); Dorchester
- Resting place: Bunhill Fields, London.
- Education: Rev. Dr Fell, Thaxted (private), Inner Temple
- Occupations: hat maker, merchant, politician.
- Known for: Conversation, Criticism, Wit
- Children: Maria Kinnaird (adopted)

Richard Sharp, FRS, FSA (1759 – 30 March 1835), also known as "Conversation" Sharp, was an English hat-maker, banker, merchant, poet, critic, Member of Parliament, and conversationalist. He was at various times known in London society as "Hatter Sharp", "Furrier Sharp", "Copenhagen Sharp" (after a speech that he gave as an MP castigating the British bombardment of Copenhagen), or most famously of all as "Conversation Sharp".

== Background and early life ==
His grandfather, another Richard Sharp (c. 1690–1775), from a family of clothiers at Romsey, Hampshire, had been apprenticed in 1712 to George Baker, a freeman of the Goldsmiths' Company of London, but a haberdasher of hats by trade. He completed his apprenticeship, and by the early 1730s he was George Baker's partner in the successful hatting business on Fish Street Hill in the City of London. Baker & Sharp were frequent buyers of beaver at Hudson's Bay Company sales, which they would have supplied to felt-makers who made the felt "hoods" from which finished hats were fashioned. They had dealings with merchants in South Carolina in the 1730s and 1740s.

George Baker retired about 1747 and Richard Sharp carried on the business. He took a nephew, John Sharp, into partnership about 1760, but John died in 1766, and Richard Sharp faced a crisis in securing the future of his firm. His only son, also called Richard, had obtained a commission as ensign in the 40th Regiment of Foot in 1756, was stationed at St John's, Newfoundland, where he married a local woman, Elizabeth Adams in 1759, and returned to England about 1763, dying in London two years later. They had two young sons, Richard (born 1759) and William. No doubt planning for his successor, the boys' grandfather took into partnership another hatter, Thomas Cable Davis, who married the boys' mother in 1769. Next year old Richard Sharp made his will, in which he recorded that Davis had agreed to take one of the grandsons as an apprentice when he was old enough, and eventually make him a partner in the hatting business for a three-sevenths share. In 1775, shortly before his death, Sharp added a codicil showing that Richard, the elder of the two boys, had become the apprentice. Provisions were also made to loan substantial sums from the estate to Thomas Cable Davis, who must not have had enough capital to maintain the business on his own, if old Sharp's share was taken out by his executors. By his grandfather's will, young Richard was to receive £1,500, to be held in trust for him by his uncles until he came of age. He was a partner with his stepfather, in the firm of Davis & Sharp, still at No. 6, Fish Street Hill in 1782.

So Young Richard Sharp's future as a haberdasher of hats in a long-established family business had been settled by the time he was 11 years old. His wealthy grandfather's determination to keep the business in family hands would have left the child no opportunity to plan for anything different. Before his apprenticeship began, however, Sharp had been placed with a private tutor at Thaxted, Essex, the Rev. John Fell, minister of a Dissenting congregation there (Sharp's own family were Dissenters), and this must have opened his eyes to other possibilities. Sharp and Fell remained friends until Fell's death at the age of 24. Sharp wrote a preface to Fell's book, An Essay towards an English Grammar (1784).

== Adult life ==
Sharp's activities in his third decade show him seeking intellectual stimulation and finding political issues that interested him. It was not hard to enter the ranks of society where that was possible – he had some family money and there were plenty of individuals in and about the City, many of them young, who enjoyed thought-provoking books, fashionable ideas and good conversation. Often they were Dissenters like himself. He is reported to have met Samuel Johnson (who died when Sharp was only 24) and dined regularly with Boswell. Perhaps sampling a different career, he was admitted to the Inner Temple on 24 January 1786, though he was never called to the Bar. In 1788 he became a member of the Committee for the Society for Effecting the Abolition of the Slave Trade (formed in 1787). He became a member of various reform political clubs over subsequent years.

In 1798 Sharp finally left the hatting business, which came to an end when the other partner, his stepfather Davis, died two years later. In response to an invitation from a friend, Samuel Boddington, another Dissenter, he now took up a partnership in the latter's West India merchant's firm. A third partner was Sir George Philips (later Sir George Philips). This new enterprise with a potential of great profits must have opened the door to the considerable wealth that Sharp was able to accumulate. However, it must have tested the depth of his anti-slavery sympathies, as the entire West India trade was based on the use of plantation slaves.

A commentator described Sharp at about the age of 30 as:

already a figure in society, where his great conversational powers and his unbounded goodness of heart made him universally welcome. His judgement was trusted by all who knew him, and in later years statesmen went to him for counsel and advice. It would scarcely be too much to say that he was the most popular man in London society in his time.

Sharp made so much money as a merchant, and through his investments and banking connections, that he eventually left £250,000 in his will. He was once described as being "one of the most considerable merchants in London". His acquired knowledge of the shipping business, for instance, enabled him to give crucial support and advice to Samuel Taylor Coleridge in 1804 when the poet was about to leave England for health reasons. As a respected London critic, Sharp also gave assistance and encouragement to Coleridge and Wordsworth, among many others, and although much of their correspondence with Sharp has been sold overseas, some may still be seen in the poets' collected works.

=== Powers as a conversationalist ===
Despite his modest roots, Richard Sharp's exceptional cleverness and powers of conversation gained him acceptance in the highest social circles and led to him acquiring a lasting sobriquet. Although he achieved distinction in many areas, he seems to have made most impact simply by his basic human kindness and wisdom, as quotes from some of those who knew him well illustrate:

John William Ward, later Earl of Dudley, also a man of immense personal wealth similarly renowned as a talented, quick-witted, humorous man with a tenacious memory, described Richard Sharp as,

Hatter Sharp, alias Copenhagen Sharp, alias Conversation Sharp, he is my particular friend, and I cannot forbear adding in perfect seriousness one of the most thoroughly amiable, good-tempered, well-informed, sensible men that I have ever become acquainted with.

Francis Horner, an original contributor to the Edinburgh Review and a barrister before he turned to politics, met Sharp when he came to London:

This morning spent with Sharp has forced me to attempt again a journal. He is a very extraordinary man; I have seen so much of him lately that I determine every day to see more of him, as much as I possibly can. His great subject is criticism, upon which he always appears to me original and profound; what I have not frequently observed in combination, he is both subtle and feeling. Next to literature, the powers of his understanding, at once ingenious and plain, show themselves in the judgement of characters; he has seen much of the great men of the last generation and he appears to have seen them well. In this particular his conversation is highly interesting; from his talent of painting by incidents and minute ordinary features, he almost carries you back to the society of those great personages and makes you live for a moment in their presence.

Horner later wrote to Lady Mackintosh in 1805 in the same admiring tones, complaining that he simply could not get enough of Sharp's company and telling her: "Sharp I respect and love more and more every day; he has every day new talents and new virtues to show." Her husband, Sir James Mackintosh, was one of few people with which Sharp felt able to discuss metaphysics. He expressed the view that Richard Sharp had made greater influence on his thinking than almost any other person. In Byron's opinion Sharp was one who had "lived much with the best – Fox, Horne Tooke, Windham, Fitzpatrick and all the agitators of other times and tongues." Macaulay was similarly impressed and commented in a letter to his sister before leaving for India:

The other day I had a long talk with Sharp about everything and everybody – metaphysics, poetry, politics, scenery and paintings. One thing I have observed in Sharp which is quite peculiar to him among Town wits and diners-out – he never talks scandal. If he can say nothing good of a man he holds his tongue. I do not of course mean that in confidential communications about politics he does not speak freely of public men, but about the follies of individuals I do not believe that – as much as I have talked with him – I ever heard him utter one word. I passed three or four hours very agreeably in his company.

As a young man Sharp met Samuel Johnson and Edmund Burke, and dined regularly with Boswell. He was close friends with the dramatist Richard Cumberland, Mrs Siddons and John Henderson the actor. The latter once asked Sharp to report on the acting ability of an up-and-coming rival, John Kemble, which he did.

== Friends and acquaintances ==
Sharp's reputation as a critic increased when his close friend Samuel Rogers began to emerge as the most eminent and popular poet of the period (his "To a Friend" being dedicated to Sharp) and both visited Wordsworth in the Lakes and gave him important "city" support before his naturalistic style of poetry became truly fashionable. The Rogers family in Newington Green was well known in Dissenting circles, and the names of Joseph Priestley, Samuel Parr, Richard Price, Rev. John Fell, Kippis and Towers were eminently familiar to both men. Apart from a common interest in Unitarianism, Sharp and Rogers became well known for their good taste, at a time when such taste was one of the most vital commodities that an aspiring young man could acquire.

The Rogers home in St James's Place was visited by many notable people in London, including royalty. Both men were habitués at the fashionable Whig salon, Holland House. Correspondence between Sharp and Lord and Lady Holland has been preserved. When Sharp moved to Park Lane, he obtained portraits painted by Reynolds of Johnson, Burke, and Reynolds himself to represent his interests in language, oratory, and art. At his residence in Mickleham, Surrey, he hosted politicians, artists, scientists, and various intellectual figures, including international visitors such as Mme de Staël. Guests recorded include Henry Hallam, Thomas Colley Grattan, Sydney Smith, John Stuart Mill, James Mill, Basil Hall, Dugald Stewart, Horne Tooke, Lord Jeffrey, Archbishop Whately, Walter Scott, Tom Moore, George Crabbe, Michael Faraday, Charles Babbage, Richard Porson, Maria Edgeworth, Francis Chantrey, and Sir Thomas Lawrence.

== Politics ==
By the late 1780s Sharp was at the hub of the Dissenter movement in London at a crucial time when Revolution was in the air and young Whig intellectuals such as he fell under suspicion. He belonged to the Society for Constitutional Information and helped other leading Whigs to establish the Society of the Friends of the People. About the same time he became one of the Dissenters' "Deputies" – it being a custom for each Dissenting congregation within ten miles of London to be represented by two deputies, their aim being to overturn the Test Acts that discriminated against them. Here Sharp issued a famous letter in support of repeal.

In 1787 the Society for Effecting the Abolition of the Slave Trade was formed and Thomas Clarkson records that Richard Sharp was elected onto it along with David Hartley. The Committee produced prints showing the cramped layout on a typical slave ship (the Brookes), which had a profound effect on all who saw it, helping much to change public opinion on the slave trade. The print showed each slave being allocated less than 2 metres in height and 0.5-metre in width for a lengthy sea voyage that could last for six months or more, such figures being reached on the assumption that there were about 400 slaves on a ship when in fact there were sometimes more than 600.

At various times Sharp represented the Whig party as a dissenting Member of Parliament: for Castle Rising, 1806–1812, Portarlington, 1816–1819, and Ilchester 1826–1827. In the Commons he often sat next to his friend Samuel Whitbread, whose move for popular education he supported.

== Clubs and societies ==
Sharp was a founder member of the intellectual "King of Clubs" conversation club; and a member of many other London clubs and societies, including Brooks's, the Athenaeum, the Unincreasable, the Eumelean, and the Clifford Street Club.

An early member of the Literary Society, he became in 1787 a Fellow of the Society of Antiquaries and in 1806 a Fellow of the Royal Society, his application to the latter being supported by Charles Burney Jnr, James Watt, Humphry Davy and others. From 1810 to 1812 he was Prime Warden of the Fishmongers' Company.

== London Institution ==
Sharp's shrewdness and eloquence were frequently aimed at a tangible outcome or change. He was a leading figure in the 1806 foundation of the London Institution for popular education. One commentator wrote it was "chiefly owing to his influences and exertions that the London Institute [sic] for the improvement of Science and Literature has been established." At its foundation, Sharp was a member of the Institution's Temporary Management Committee and he remained as such for most of his life. In 1810 he served as its chairman, resigning from the position on 10 September 1812. For the years 1827 and 1831 he was Vice-President. As his interest in education grew, he supported Whitbread's move for a proper system of state education and Henry Brougham's drive for a fully-fledged city university.

Sharp's initiative precedes that of a better known contemporary, George Birkbeck, also from a Dissenter background, whose Mechanics' Institutes developed in Glasgow, London and elsewhere from the 1820s onwards. Many of the founders of the London Institution later joined Thomas Campbell and Brougham in establishing a new University of London.

== Final years and death ==
Towards the end of his life Sharp liked to spend the winter months at his house in Higher Terrace, Torquay. He had suffered all his life with a cough and a bad chest and Torquay was noted for both its health-giving air and Italianate landscape, but in 1834 the winter was particularly severe and as Sharp succumbed he resolved that he would die in his beloved London. He set off for the city with his family and servants but got only as far as Dorchester before expiring at the coaching inn there. It is said that, fearful that a nephew might obtain and subvert his will, 70-year-old George Philips, in a final act of kindness, set off on his horse "Canon" and rode through the night as fast as he could to ensure that this did not occur.

== Personal life ==
Sharp never married, but in about 1812 he adopted two year old Maria Kinnaird, who had been orphaned by a catastrophic volcano eruption in the West Indies. Maria, as a teenager, knew William Wordsworth's daughter, Dora, very well and later led an interesting and colourful life in London society. Macaulay and Romilly (son of Samuel Romilly) were among many eligible young men who were said to be enamoured of Maria, but in 1835 she married Thomas Drummond, who later became Under-Secretary for Ireland.

== Published work ==
Sharp's only book was Letters and Essays in Prose and Verse (1834). The Quarterly Review described it as remarkable for "wisdom, wit, knowledge of the world and sound criticism". Several editions were published, including an American edition.

Sharp considered writing a history of American independence and wrote to his friends, John Adams and John Quincy Adams about this and other matters. He also considered writing a tourist's guide to Europe after becoming so familiar with continental travel that he was once called "the Thomas Cook of his day". None of these projects came to fruition, however.

== Portrait ==
A single contemporary image of Sharp is known to exist: a drawing in the Bodleian Library, Oxford.

Parliament of the United Kingdom
| Preceded by Charles Bagot-Chester; Peter Isaac Thellusson | Member of Parliament for Castle Rising; 1806–1812; With: Charles Bagot-Chester 1806–1807; Charles Bagot 1807–1808; Fulk Greville Howard 1808–1812 | Succeeded by Augustus Cavendish-Bradshaw; Fulk Greville Howard |
| Preceded by Arthur Shakespeare | Member of Parliament for Portarlington; 1816–1819 | Succeeded by David Ricardo |
| Preceded by Sir Isaac Coffin; Stephen Lushington | Member of Parliament for Ilchester; 1826–1827; With: John Williams | Succeeded by Lord Huntingtower; Felix Thomas Tollemache |
