= Thomas Drummond =

British engineer, later settled in Ireland

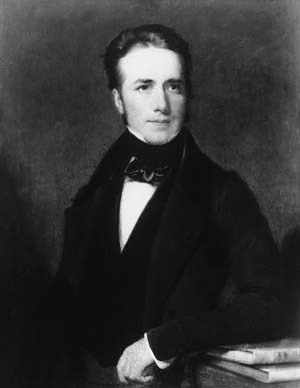
- Portrait by Henry William Pickersgill, c. 1838
- Born: 10 October 1797; Edinburgh, Scotland
- Died: 15 April 1840 (aged 42)
- Resting place: Ireland; Mount Jerome Dublin
- Occupation: Civil engineer
- Known for: Cartography; Drummond lamp
- Spouse: Maria Kinnaird
- Children: three daughters

Captain Thomas Drummond (10 October 1797 – 15 April 1840), from Edinburgh was a Scottish British Army officer, civil engineer and senior public official. He used the Drummond light which was employed in the trigonometrical survey of Great Britain and Ireland. He is sometimes mistakenly given credit for the invention of limelight, at the expense of Sir Goldsworthy Gurney. It was Drummond, however, who realised its value in surveying.

== Early life ==
Drummond was the second of three sons. Despite his father dying when he was young, he credited his mother with getting him through his education at Edinburgh High School and then on to be a Royal Engineer cadet at Woolwich Academy in 1813. He showed an early gift for mathematics. After Woolwich he was stationed in Edinburgh and was involved with public works. He was bored with this and had enrolled at Lincoln's Inn when he was recruited to use his trigonometry to help conduct a survey in the Highlands.

This new work was done in the summer with the more difficult months being passed in London. Drummond took this opportunity to improve his knowledge of mathematics and science. He attended lectures by Sir Michael Faraday. At these he learned of the discovery of limelight.

== Ordnance Survey of Ireland ==
In 1824 Drummond was transferred to the new Ordnance Survey of Ireland and here he used the new Drummond light. He reported that the light could be observed 68 miles away and would cast a strong shadow at a distance of thirteen miles. Drummond left Ireland for a period prior to the Reform Act 1832. For his services to the Whigs, acting as secretary to Lord Spencer, Lord Brougham had him awarded a pension 300 pounds per annum.

In 1835 Drummond, now back with the Irish Survey, married the wealthy heiress Maria Kinnaird, who was the adopted daughter of the critic Conversation Sharp (1759–1835). They had three children, Emily, Mary and Fanny.

== Appointment as Under-Secretary for Ireland ==
In 1835, he was appointed as Under-Secretary for Ireland, heading up the Dublin Castle administration, a position he held until his death in 1840. A supporter of the Whigs, Drummond was held in high regard by Irish, whom he treated with impartiality.

== Death ==
Drummond died in 1840 and was buried in Mount Jerome Cemetery, Dublin. It was concluded by his family physician, Dr. Johnson, who spent his last days with Drummond, that he was afflicted with peritonitis, which was symptomatic of an undetermined medical cause. It is believed by some that overwork and stress precipitated his premature death in 1840 after working unceasingly for five years as Irish under-secretary.

His dying words were reported as:

"I wish to be buried in Ireland, the country of my adoption a country which I loved, which I have faithfully served, and for which I believe I have sacrificed my life."

His death took place on 15 April 1840, “in the plenitude of mental power and maturity of knowledge, beloved in private and esteemed in public.”

Drummond was critical of the system of large estates ("landlordism") in Ireland and famously stated, "Property has its duties as well as its rights."

He is credited with developing Drummond’s Light for use in surveying.

== See also ==
- Timeline of hydrogen technologies

== Notes ==
Government offices
Preceded by Sir William Gossett	Under-Secretary for Ireland; 1835–1840	Succeeded by Norman Hilton MacDonald
