= Andrew Lang =

Scottish author and critic (1844–1912)

Andrew Lang FBA
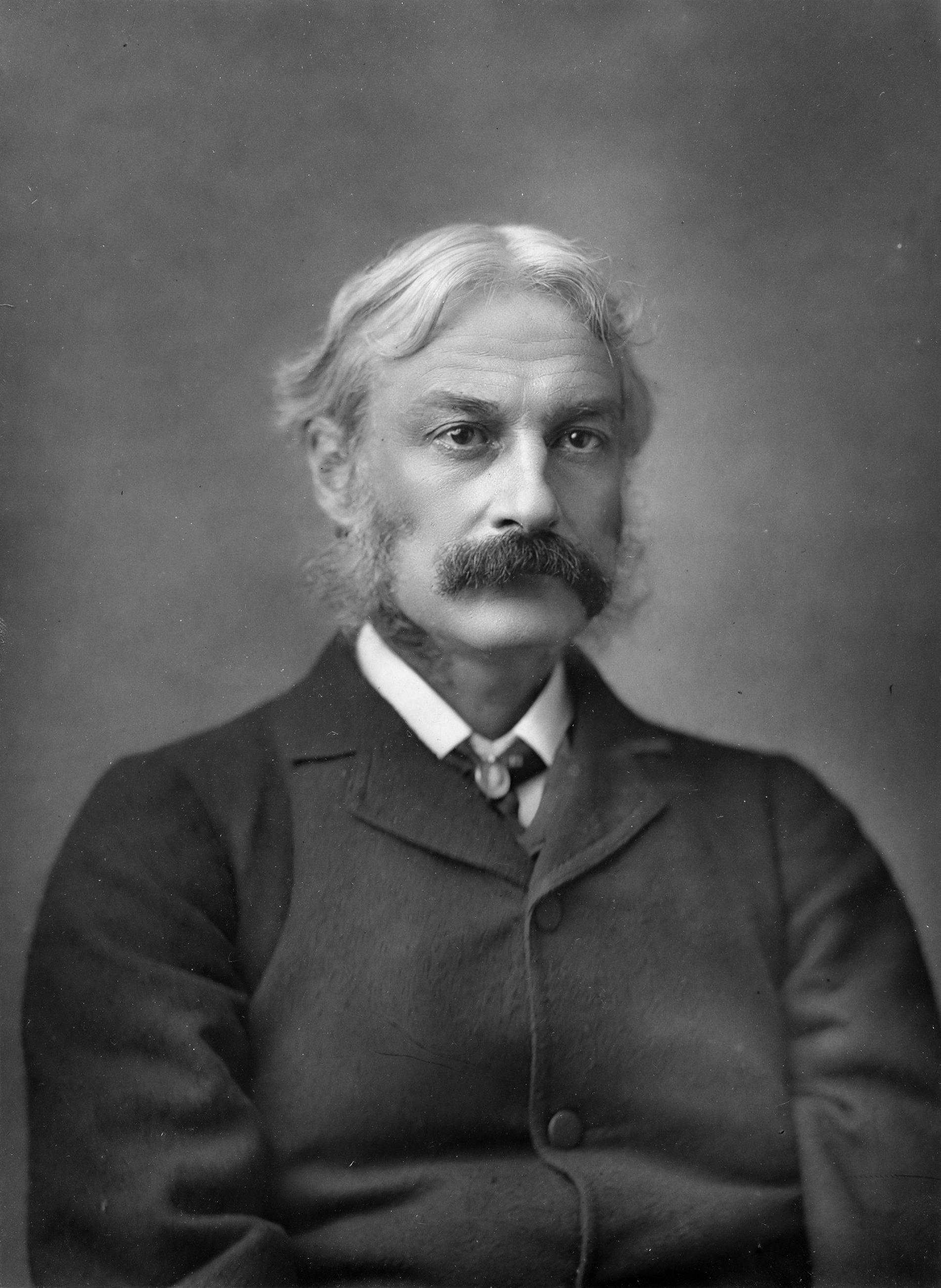
- Lang in 1888
- Born: 31 March 1844; Selkirk, Selkirkshire, Scotland
- Died: 20 July 1912 (aged 68); Banchory, Aberdeenshire, Scotland
- Education: University of St Andrews; Balliol College, Oxford
- Occupations: Poet; novelist; literary critic; anthropologist
- Spouse: Leonora Blanche Lang (m. 1875)
- Writing career
- Period: 19th century
- Genre: Children's literature

Andrew Lang (31 March 1844 – 20 July 1912) was a Scottish poet, novelist, literary critic, and contributor to the field of anthropology. He is best known as a collector of folk and fairy tales. The Andrew Lang lectures at the University of St Andrews are named after him.

== Life and career ==
Lang was born in 1844 in Selkirk, Scottish Borders. He was the eldest of the eight children born to John Lang, the town clerk of Selkirk, and his wife Jane Plenderleath Sellar On 17 April 1875, he married Leonora Blanche Lang, youngest daughter of C. T. Alleyne of Clifton and Barbados. She was (or should have been) variously credited as author, collaborator, or translator of Lang's Colour/Rainbow Fairy Books which he edited.

He was educated at Selkirk Grammar School, Loretto School, and the Edinburgh Academy, as well as the University of St Andrews and Balliol College, Oxford, where he took a first class in the final classical schools in 1868, becoming a fellow and subsequently honorary fellow of Merton College. He soon made a reputation as one of the most able and versatile writers of the day as a journalist, poet, critic, and historian. He was a member of the Order of the White Rose, a Neo-Jacobite society which attracted many writers and artists in the 1890s and 1900s. On 6 December 1888, Lang was elected president of The Folklore Society following the resignation of George Byng, 3rd Earl of Strafford from the position. In 1906, he was elected FBA.

He died of angina pectoris on 20 July 1912 at the Tor-na-Coille Hotel in Banchory, survived by his wife. He was buried in the cathedral precincts at St Andrews, where a monument can be visited in the southeast corner of the 19th-century section.

== Scholarship ==
=== Folklore and anthropology ===
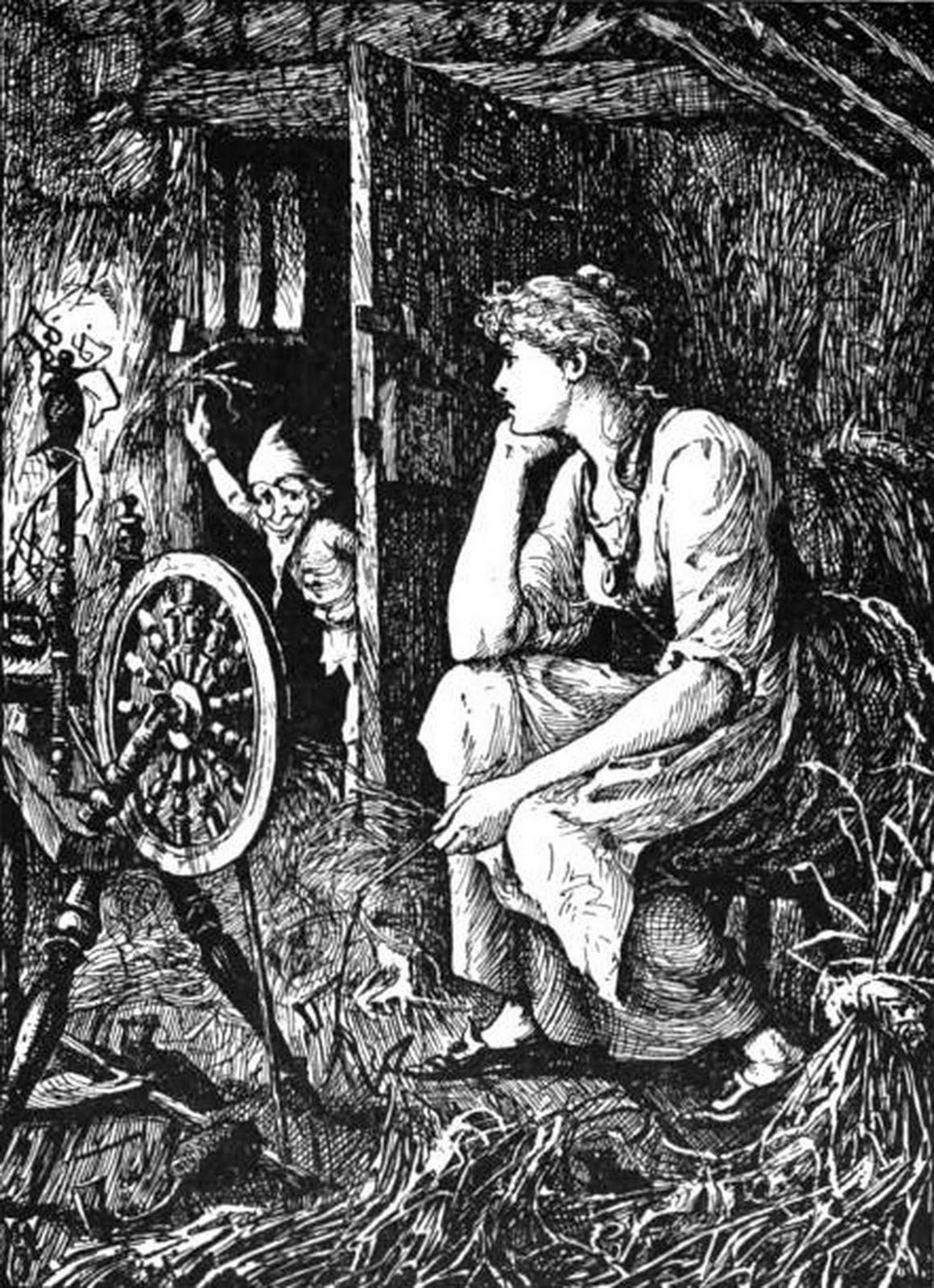
"Rumpelstiltskin", by Henry Justice Ford from Lang's Fairy Tales

Lang is now chiefly known for his publications on folklore, mythology, and religion. His interest in folklore was from early life; he read John Ferguson McLennan before coming to Oxford, and then was influenced by E. B. Tylor.

The earliest of his publications is Custom and Myth (1884). In Myth, Ritual and Religion (1887) he explained the "irrational" elements of mythology as survivals from more primitive forms. Lang's Making of Religion was heavily influenced by the 18th-century idea of the "noble savage": in it, he maintained the existence of high spiritual ideas among so-called "savage" races, drawing parallels with the contemporary interest in occult phenomena in England. His Blue Fairy Book (1889) was an illustrated edition of fairy tales that has become a classic. This was followed by many other collections of fairy tales, collectively known as Andrew Lang's Fairy Books despite most of the work for them being done by his wife Leonora Blanche Lang and a team of assistants. In the preface to the Lilac Fairy Book he credits his wife with translating and transcribing most of the stories in the collections. Lang examined the origins of totemism in Social Origins (1903).

=== Psychical research ===
Lang was one of the founders of "psychical research" and his other writings on anthropology include The Book of Dreams and Ghosts (1897), Magic and Religion (1901) and The Secret of the Totem (1905). He served as president of the Society for Psychical Research in 1911.

Lang extensively cited nineteenth- and twentieth-century European spiritualism to challenge the idea of his teacher, Tylor, that belief in spirits and animism was inherently irrational. Lang used Tylor's work and his own psychical research in an effort to posit an anthropological critique of materialism. Andrew Lang fiercely debated with his Folklore Society colleague Edward Clodd over 'Psycho-folklore,' a strand of the discipline which aimed to connect folklore with psychical research.

=== Classical scholarship ===
He collaborated with S. H. Butcher in a prose translation (1879) of Homer's Odyssey, and with E. Myers and Walter Leaf in a prose version (1883) of the Iliad, both still noted for their archaic but attractive style. He was a Homeric scholar of conservative views. Other works include Homer and the Study of Greek found in Essays in Little (1891); Homer and the Epic (1893); a prose translation of The Homeric Hymns (1899), with literary and mythological essays in which he draws parallels between Greek myths and other mythologies; Homer and His Age (1906); and "Homer and Anthropology" (1908).

=== Historian ===
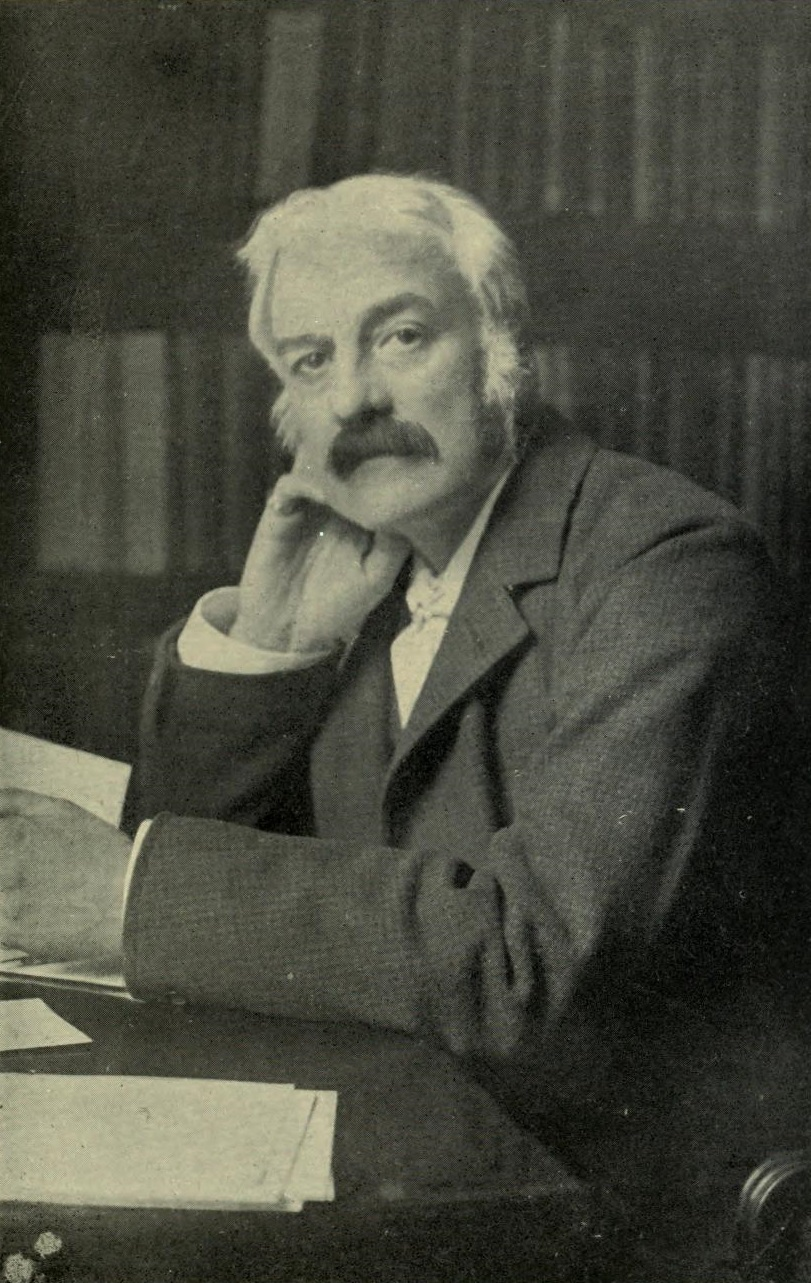
Andrew Lang at work

Lang's writings on Scottish history are characterised by a scholarly care for detail, a piquant literary style, and a gift for disentangling complicated questions. The Mystery of Mary Stuart (1901) was a consideration of the fresh light thrown on Mary, Queen of Scots, by the Lennox manuscripts in the University Library, Cambridge, approving of her and criticising her accusers.

He also wrote monographs on The Portraits and Jewels of Mary Stuart (1906) and James VI and the Gowrie Mystery (1902). The somewhat unfavourable view of John Knox presented in his book John Knox and the Reformation (1905) aroused considerable controversy. He gave new information about the continental career of the Young Pretender in Pickle the Spy (1897), an account of Alastair Ruadh MacDonnell, whom he identified with Pickle, a notorious Hanoverian spy. This was followed by The Companions of Pickle (1898) and a monograph on Prince Charles Edward (1900). In 1900 he began a History of Scotland from the Roman Occupation (1900). The Valet's Tragedy (1903), which takes its title from an essay on Dumas's Man in the Iron Mask, collects twelve papers on historical mysteries, and A Monk of Fife (1896) is a fictitious narrative purporting to be written by a young Scot in France in 1429–1431.

=== Other writings ===
Lang's earliest publication was a volume of metrical experiments, The Ballads and Lyrics of Old France (1872), and this was followed at intervals by other volumes of dainty verse: Ballades in Blue China (1880, enlarged edition, 1888); Ballads and Verses Vain (1884), selected by Mr Austin Dobson; Rhymes à la Mode (1884); Grass of Parnassus (1888); Ban and Arrière Ban (1894); and New Collected Rhymes (1905). His 1890 collection, Old Friends: Essays in Epistolary Parody, contains letters combining characters from different sources, in what is now known as a crossover, including one based on Jane Austen's Northanger Abbey and Charlotte Brontë's Jane Eyre—an early example of a published derivative work based on Austen.

Lang was active as a journalist in various ways, ranging from sparkling "leaders" for the Daily News to miscellaneous articles for the Morning Post, and for many years he was literary editor of Longman's Magazine; no critic was in more request, whether for occasional articles and introductions to new editions or as editor of dainty reprints.

He edited The Poems and Songs of Robert Burns (1896), and was responsible for the Life and Letters (1897) of JG Lockhart, and The Life, Letters and Diaries (1890) of Sir Stafford Northcote, 1st Earl of Iddesleigh. Lang discussed literary subjects with the same humour and acidity that marked his criticism of fellow folklorists, in Books and Bookmen (1886), Letters to Dead Authors (1886), Letters on Literature (1889), etc.

== Works ==
=== To 1884 ===
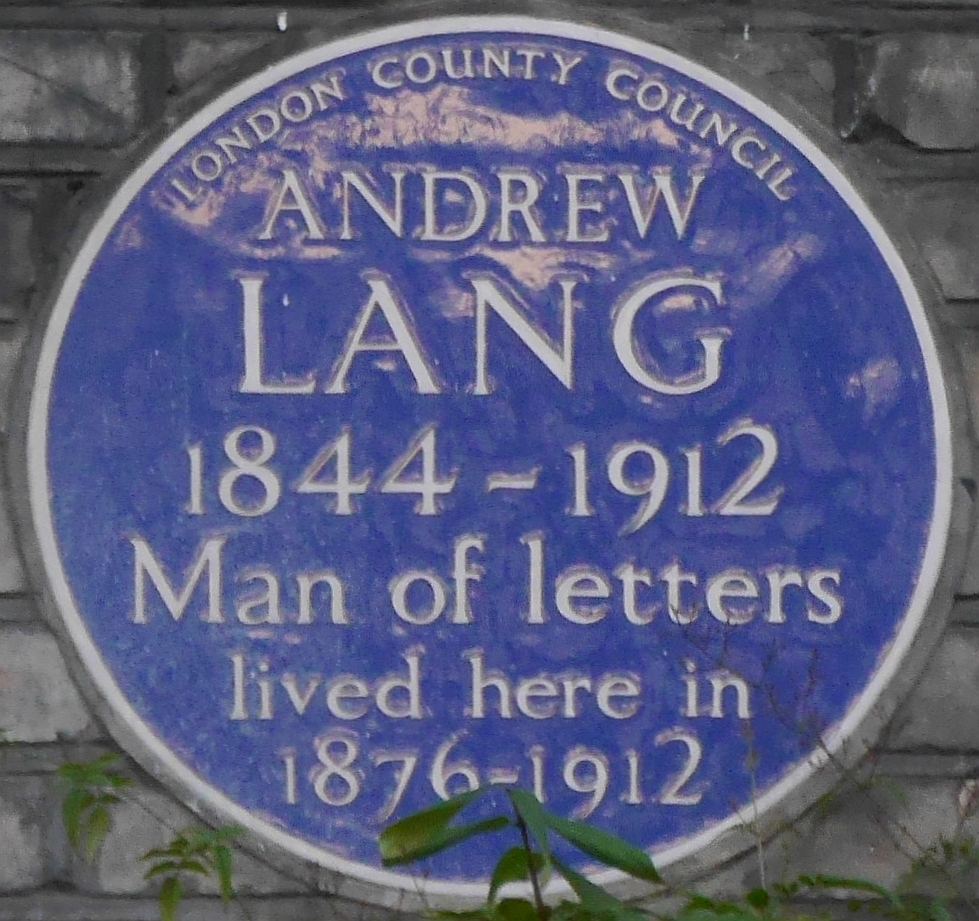
Blue plaque, 1 Marloes Road, Kensington, London

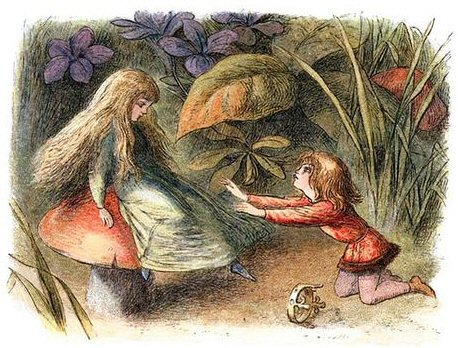
The prince thanking the Water Fairy, image from The Princess Nobody (1884), illustrated by Richard Doyle, engraved and coloured by Edmund Evans

- St Leonards Magazine. 1863. This was a reprint of several articles that appeared in the St Leonards Magazine that Lang edited at St Andrews University. Includes the following Lang contributions: Pages 10–13, Dawgley Manor; A sentimental burlesque; Pages 25–26, Nugae Catulus; Pages 27–30, Popular Philosophies; pages 43–50 are Papers by Eminent Contributors, seven short parodies of which six are by Lang.
- The Ballads and Lyrics of Old France (1872)
- The Odyssey of Homer Rendered into English Prose (1879) translator with Samuel Henry Butcher
- Aristotle's Politics Books I. III. IV. (VII.). The Text of Bekker. With an English translation by W. E. Bolland. Together with short introductory essays by A. Lang To page 106 are Lang's Essays, pp. 107–305 are the translation. Lang's essays without the translated text were later published as The Politics of Aristotle. Introductory Essays. 1886.
- The Folklore of France (1878)
- Specimens of a Translation of Theocritus. 1879. This was an advance issue of extracts from Theocritus, Bion and Moschus rendered into English prose
- XXXII Ballades in Blue China (1880)
- Oxford. Brief historical & descriptive notes (1880). The 1915 edition of this work was illustrated by painter George Francis Carline.
- Theocritus Bion and Moschus. Rendered into English Prose with an Introductory Essay. 1880.
- Notes by Mr A. Lang on a collection of pictures by Mr J. E. Millais R.A. exhibited at the Fine Arts Society Rooms. 148 New Bond Street. 1881.
- The Library: with a chapter on modern illustrated books. 1881.
- The Black Thief. A new and original drama (Adapted from the Irish) in four acts. (1882)
- Helen of Troy, her life and translation. Done into rhyme from the Greek books. 1882.
- The Most Pleasant and Delectable Tale of the Marriage of Cupid and Psyche (1882) with William Aldington
- The Iliad of Homer, a prose translation (1883) with Walter Leaf and Ernest Myers
- Custom and Myth (1884)
- The Princess Nobody: A Tale of Fairyland (1884)
- Ballads and Verses Vain (1884) selected by Austin Dobson
- Rhymes à la Mode (1884)
- Much Darker Days. By A. Huge Longway. (1884)
- Household tales; their origin, diffusion, and relations to the higher myths. [1884]. Separate pre-publication issue of the "introduction" to Bohn's edition of Grimm's Household tales.

=== 1885–1889 ===
- That Very Mab (1885) with May Kendall
- Books and Bookmen (1886)
- Letters to Dead Authors (1886)
- In the Wrong Paradise (1886) stories
- The Mark of Cain (1886) novel
- Lines on the inaugural meeting of the Shelley Society. Reprinted for private distribution from the Saturday Review of 13 March 1886 and edited by Thomas Wise (1886)
- La Mythologie Traduit de L'Anglais par Léon Léon Parmentier. Avec une préface par Charles Michel et des Additions de l'auteur. (1886) Never published as a complete book in English, although there was a Polish translation. The first 170 pages is a translation of the article in the 'Encyclopædia Britannica'. The rest is a combination of articles and material from 'Custom and Myth'.
- Almae matres (1887)
- He (1887 with Walter Herries Pollock) parody
- Aucassin and Nicolette (1887)
- Myth, Ritual and Religion (2 vols., 1887)
- Johnny Nut and the Golden Goose. Done into English from the French of Charles Deulin (1887)
- Grass of Parnassus. Rhymes old and new. (1888)
- Perrault's Popular Tales (1888)
- Gold of Fairnilee (1888)
- Pictures at Play or Dialogues of the Galleries (1888) with W. E. Henley
- Prince Prigio (1889)
- The Blue Fairy Book (1889) (illustrations by Henry J. Ford)
- Letters on Literature (1889)
- Lost Leaders (1889)
- Ode to Golf and Ballade of the Royal Game of Golf. Contribution to On the Links; being Golfing Stories by various hands (1889)
- The Dead Leman and other tales from the French (1889) translator with Paul Sylvester

=== 1890–1899 ===
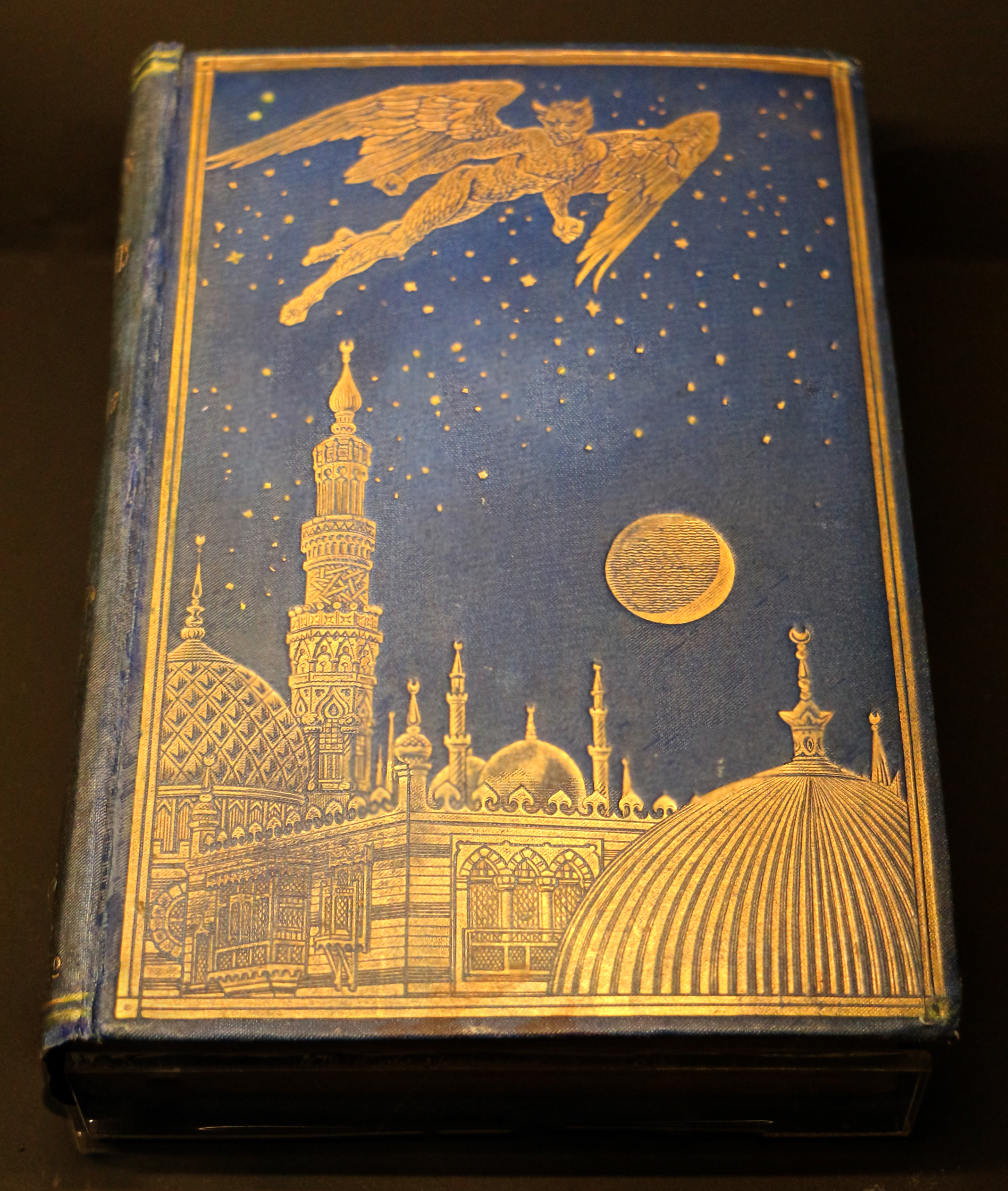
The Arabian Nights Entertainments, Longman Green & co., London 1898

- The Red Fairy Book (1890)
- The World's Desire (1890) with H. Rider Haggard
- Old Friends: Essays in Epistolary Parody (1890)
- The Strife of Love in a Dream, Being the Elizabethan Version of the First Book of the Hypnerotomachia of Francesco Colonna (1890)
- The Life, Letters and Diaries of Sir Stafford Northcote, 1st Earl of Iddesleigh (1890)
- Etudes traditionnistes (1890)
- How to Fail in Literature (1890)
- The Blue Poetry Book (1891)
- Essays in Little (1891)
- On Calais Sands (1891)
- Angling Sketches (1891)
- The Green Fairy Book (1892)
- The Library with a Chapter on Modern English Illustrated Books (1892) with Austin Dobson
- William Young Sellar (1892)
- The True Story Book (1893)
- Homer and the Epic (1893)
- Prince Ricardo of Pantouflia (1893)
- Waverley Novels (by Walter Scott), 48 volumes (1893) editor
- St. Andrews (1893)
- Montezuma's Daughter (1893) with H. Rider Haggard
- Kirk's Secret Commonwealth (1893)
- The Tercentenary of Izaak Walton (1893)
- The Yellow Fairy Book (1894)
- Ban and Arrière Ban (1894)
- Cock Lane and Common-Sense (1894)
- Memoir of R. F. Murray (1894)
- The Red True Story Book (1895)
- My Own Fairy Book (1895)
- A Monk of Fife (1895)
- The Voices of Jeanne D'Arc (1895)
- The Animal Story Book (1896)
- The Poems and Songs of Robert Burns (1896) editor
- The Life and Letters of John Gibson Lockhart (1896) two volumes
- Pickle the Spy; or the Incognito of Charles, (1897)
- The Nursery Rhyme Book (1897)
- The Miracles of Madame Saint Katherine of Fierbois (1897) translator
- The Pink Fairy Book (1897)
- A Book of Dreams and Ghosts (1897)
- Pickle the Spy (1897)
- Modern Mythology. London: Longmans, Green, and Co. 1897 – via Internet Archive.
- The Companions of Pickle (1898)
- The Arabian Nights Entertainments (1898)
- The Making of Religion (1898)
- Selections from Coleridge (1898)
- Waiting on the Glesca Train (1898)
- The Red Book of Animal Stories (1899)
- Parson Kelly (1899) Co-written with A. E. W. Mason
- The Homeric Hymns (1899) translator
- The Works of Charles Dickens in Thirty-four Volumes (1899) editor

=== 1900–1909 ===
- The Grey Fairy Book (1900)
- Prince Charles Edward (1900)
- Parson Kelly (1900)
- The Poems and Ballads of Sir Walter Scott, Bart (1900) editor
- A History of Scotland – From the Roman Occupation (1900–1907) four volumes
- Notes and Names in Books (1900)
- Alfred Tennyson (1901)
- Magic and Religion (1901)
- Adventures Among Books (1901)
- The Crimson Fairy Book (1903)
- The Mystery of Mary Stuart (1901, new and revised ed., 1904)
- The Book of Romance (1902) – contains stories about King Arthur, Charlemagne, William of Orange, and Robin Hood, adapted for children.
- The Disentanglers (1902)
- James VI and the Gowrie Mystery (1902)
- Notre-Dame of Paris (1902) translator
- The Young Ruthvens (1902)
- The Gowrie Conspiracy: the Confessions of Sprott (1902) editor
- The Violet Fairy Book (1901)
- Lyrics (1903)
- Social England Illustrated (1903) editor
- The Story of the Golden Fleece (1903)
- The Valet's Tragedy (1903)
- Social Origins (1903) with Primal Law by James Jasper Atkinson
- The Snowman and Other Fairy Stories (1903)
- Stella Fregelius: A Tale of Three Destinies (1903) with H. Rider Haggard
- The Brown Fairy Book (1904)
- Historical Mysteries (1904)
- The Secret of the Totem (1905)
- New Collected Rhymes (1905)
- John Knox and the Reformation (1905)
- The Puzzle of Dickens's Last Plot (1905)
- The Clyde Mystery. A Study in Forgeries and Folklore (1905)
- Adventures among Books (1905)
- Homer and His Age (1906)
- The Red Romance Book (1906)
- The Orange Fairy Book (1906)
- The Portraits and Jewels of Mary Stuart (1906)
- Life of Sir Walter Scott (1906)
- The Story of Joan of Arc (1906)
- New and Old Letters to Dead Authors (1906)
- Tales of a Fairy Court (1907)
- The Olive Fairy Book (1907)
- Poets' Country (1907) editor, with Churton Collins, W. J. Loftie, E. Hartley Coleridge, Michael Macmillan
- The King over the Water (1907)
- Tales of Troy and Greece (1907)
- The Origins of Religion (1908) essays
- The Book of Princes and Princesses (1908)
- Origins of Terms of Human Relationships (1908)
- Select Poems of Jean Ingelow (1908) editor
- The Maid of France, being the story of the life and death of Jeanne d'Arc (1908)
- Three Poets of French Bohemia (1908)
- The Red Book of Heroes (1909)
- The Marvellous Musician and Other Stories (1909)
- Sir George Mackenzie King's Advocate, of Rosehaugh, His Life and Times (1909)

=== 1910–1912 ===
- The Lilac Fairy Book (1910)
- Does Ridicule Kill? (1910)
- Sir Walter Scott and the Border Minstrelsy (1910)
- The World of Homer (1910)
- The All Sorts of Stories Book (1911)
- Ballades and Rhymes (1911)
- Method in the Study of Totemism (1911)
- A Short History of Scotland (1911)
- The Book of Saints and Heroes (1912)
- Shakespeare, Bacon and the Great Unknown (1912)
- A History of English Literature (1912)
- In Praise of Frugality (1912)
- Ode on a Distant Memory of Jane Eyre (1912)
- Ode to the Opening Century (1912)

=== Posthumous ===
- Highways and Byways in The Border (1913) with John Lang
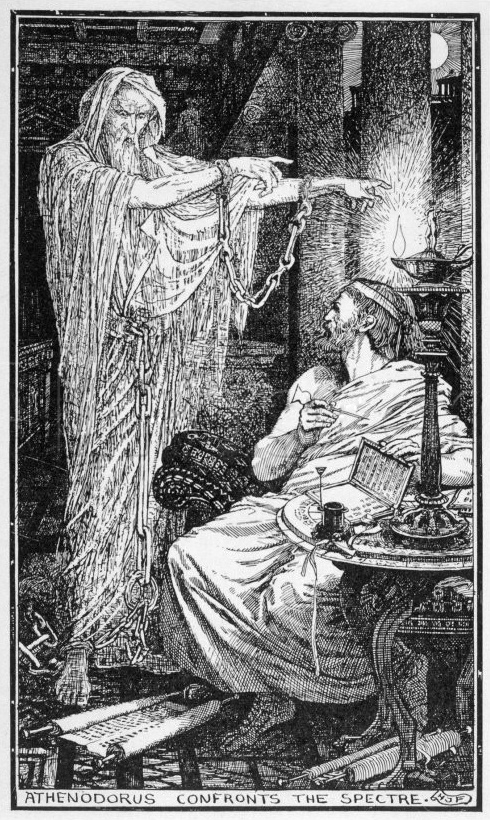
- An illustration of "Athenodorus confronts the Spectre" from The Strange Story Book by Leonora Blanche Lang; Andrew Lang.
  The Strange Story Book (1913) with Mrs. Lang
- The Poetical Works (1923) edited by Mrs. Lang, four volumes
- Old Friends Among the Fairies: Puss in Boots and Other Stories. Chosen from the Fairy Books (1926)
- Tartan Tales From Andrew Lang (1928) edited by Bertha L. Gunterman
- From Omar Khayyam (1935)

=== Andrew Lang's Fairy Books ===
Lang selected and edited 25 collections of stories that were published annually, beginning with The Blue Fairy Book in 1889 and ending with The Strange Story Book in 1913. They are sometimes called Andrew Lang's Fairy Books although the Blue Fairy Book and other Coloured Fairy Books are only 12 in the series. In this chronological list the Coloured Fairy Books alone are numbered.

- (1) The Blue Fairy Book (1889)
- (2) The Red Fairy Book (1890)
- The Blue Poetry Book (1891)
- (3) The Green Fairy Book (1892)
- The True Story Book (1893)
- (4) The Yellow Fairy Book (1894)
- The Red True Story Book (1895)
- The Animal Story Book (1896)
- (5) The Pink Fairy Book (1897)
- The Arabian Nights' Entertainments (1898)
- The Red Book of Animal Stories (1899)
- (6) The Grey Fairy Book (1900)
- (7) The Violet Fairy Book (1901)
- The Book of Romance (1902)
- (8) The Crimson Fairy Book (1903)
- (9) The Brown Fairy Book (1904)
- The Red Romance Book (1905)
- (10) The Orange Fairy Book (1906)
- (11) The Olive Fairy Book (1907)
- The Book of Princes and Princesses (1908)
- The Red Book of Heroes (1909)
- (12) The Lilac Fairy Book (1910)
- The All Sorts of Stories Book (1911)
- The Book of Saints and Heroes (1912)
- The Strange Story Book (1913)

Non-profit organization positions
Preceded by Henry Arthur Smith	President of the Society for Psychical Research; 1911	Succeeded by William Boyd Carpenter
