= Charles Hay Cameron =

British jurist (1795–1880)

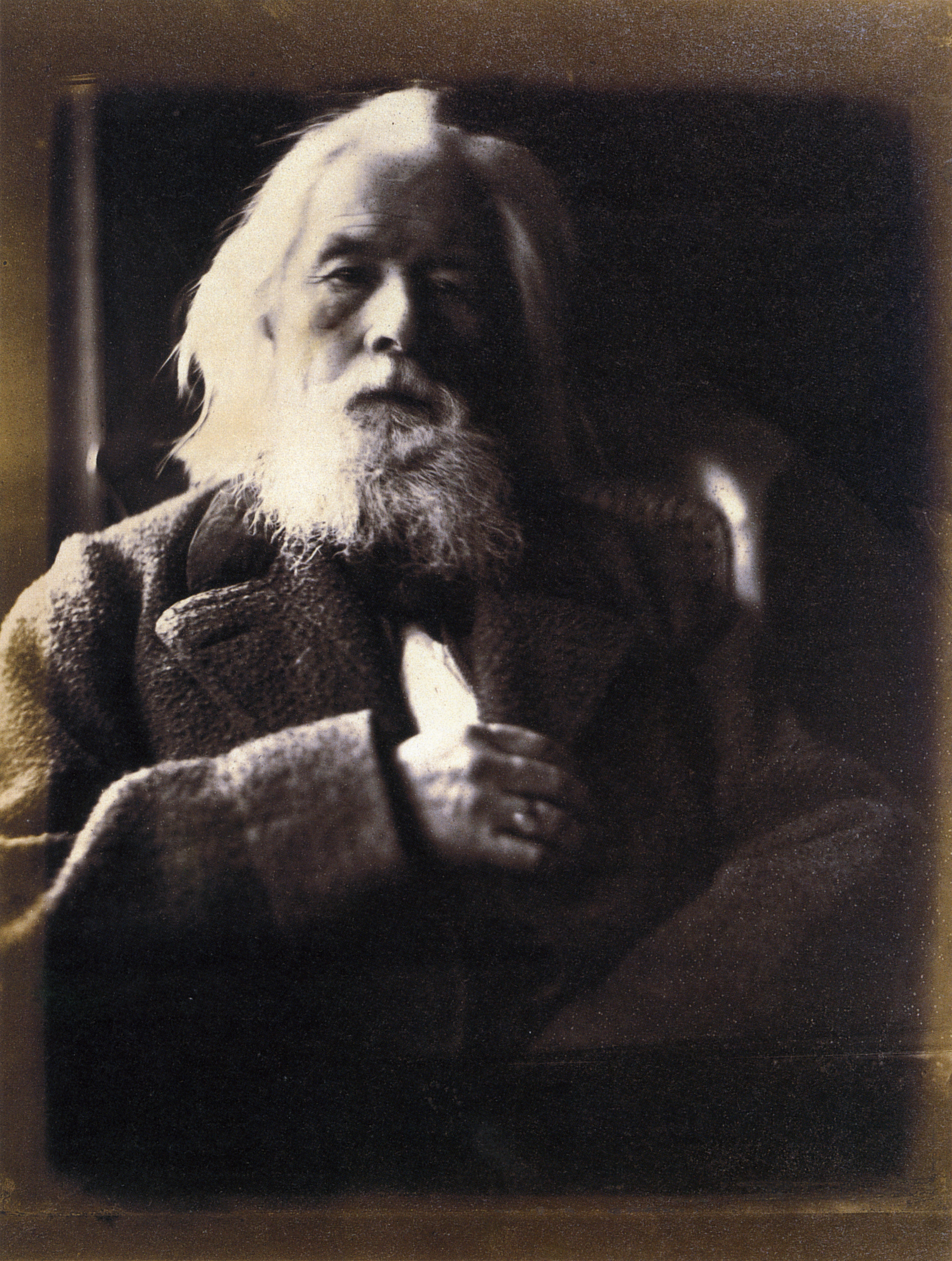
- An 1864 photo by Julia Margaret Cameron of her husband, Charles Hay Cameron

Personal details
- Born: 11 February 1795 London, England
- Died: 8 May 1880 (aged 85) Dikoya, Ceylon
- Spouse: Julia Margaret Pattle (m. 1838; died 1879)
- Children: Charles Henry Cameron; Ellen Cameron; Julia Cameron; Eugene Hay Cameron; Ewen Wrottesley Hay Cameron; Hardinge Hay Cameron; Charles Hay Cameron; Henry Herschel Hay Cameron
- Parent(s): Charles Cameron, Margaret née Hay
- Profession: Jurist

Charles Hay Cameron (11 February 1795 – 8 May 1880) was a British jurist. He was married to the photographer Julia Margaret Cameron.

== Personal life ==
Cameron was the son of Charles Cameron, governor of the Bahama Islands, by Lady Margaret Hay, daughter of James Hay, 15th Earl of Erroll. His grandfather, Donald Cameron, was the younger son of Dr. Archibald Cameron of Locheil, who had been executed in London in 1753. Charles Hay Cameron erected a monument to his great-grandfather in the Savoy Chapel. It was damaged by a fire in 1864, when Charles Lloyd Norman, Cameron's son-in-law, replaced it by a painted window.

Cameron was intimate with many prominent men of his day, in particular Sir Henry Taylor, Alfred Tennyson, and Henry Thoby Prinsep. In 1838 he married Julia Margaret Pattle, who became Julia Margaret Cameron and would be a successful and highly influential photographer in the 1860s and 1870s. In all, the Camerons raised 11 children, five of their own, five orphaned children of relatives, and an Irish girl named Mary Ryan whom they found begging on Putney Heath and whom Julia used as a model in her photographs. Their daughter Julia (died 1873) was married to Charles Lloyd Norman and mother of diplomat Herman Norman.

== Barrister ==
Cameron was called to the bar at Lincoln's Inn in 1830. He was a disciple of Jeremy Bentham. He was employed upon various commissions. His report upon "judicial establishments and procedure in Ceylon", the result of his participation in a commission with Colonel Colebrooke, is dated 31 January 1832. He was also a commissioner for inquiring into charities, and prepared a report upon the operation of the poor laws in April 1833.

== India ==
By the Government of India Act 1833 a fourth member was added to the Council of India (previously the Supreme Council of Bengal), and a law commission was constituted, one member of which was to be appointed from England. Cameron was the first member so appointed, and went to India in the beginning of 1835. In 1843 he was appointed fourth member of council, and became president of the Council of Education for Bengal, of which he had been a member from his arrival in India. Cameron took an important part in the work of codification begun by Macaulay, and was Macaulay's chief adviser and co-operator in the preparation of the penal code (Trevelyan, Macaulay, i. 427. 443, 463).

He took a great interest in the introduction of English education among the natives of India. A public meeting of natives was held at Kolkata on 22 February 1848, upon his departure for England, to thank him for his exertions, and request him to sit for his portrait.

His views were explained in an "Address to Parliament on the duties of Great Britain to India in respect of the education of the natives and their official employment, by C. H. Cameron" (1863), in which he advocated a more liberal treatment of the Indian population.

== Return to England ==
Cameron took no further part in active life after his return to England. He lived successively in London, Putney, and at Freshwater, in the Isle of Wight.

== Visit to Sri Lanka ==
In 1875, he went to Ceylon, where his sons were established. After a visit to England in 1878, he died in Ceylon on 8 May 1880.
