= Henry Herschel Hay Cameron =

British photographer (1852–1911)

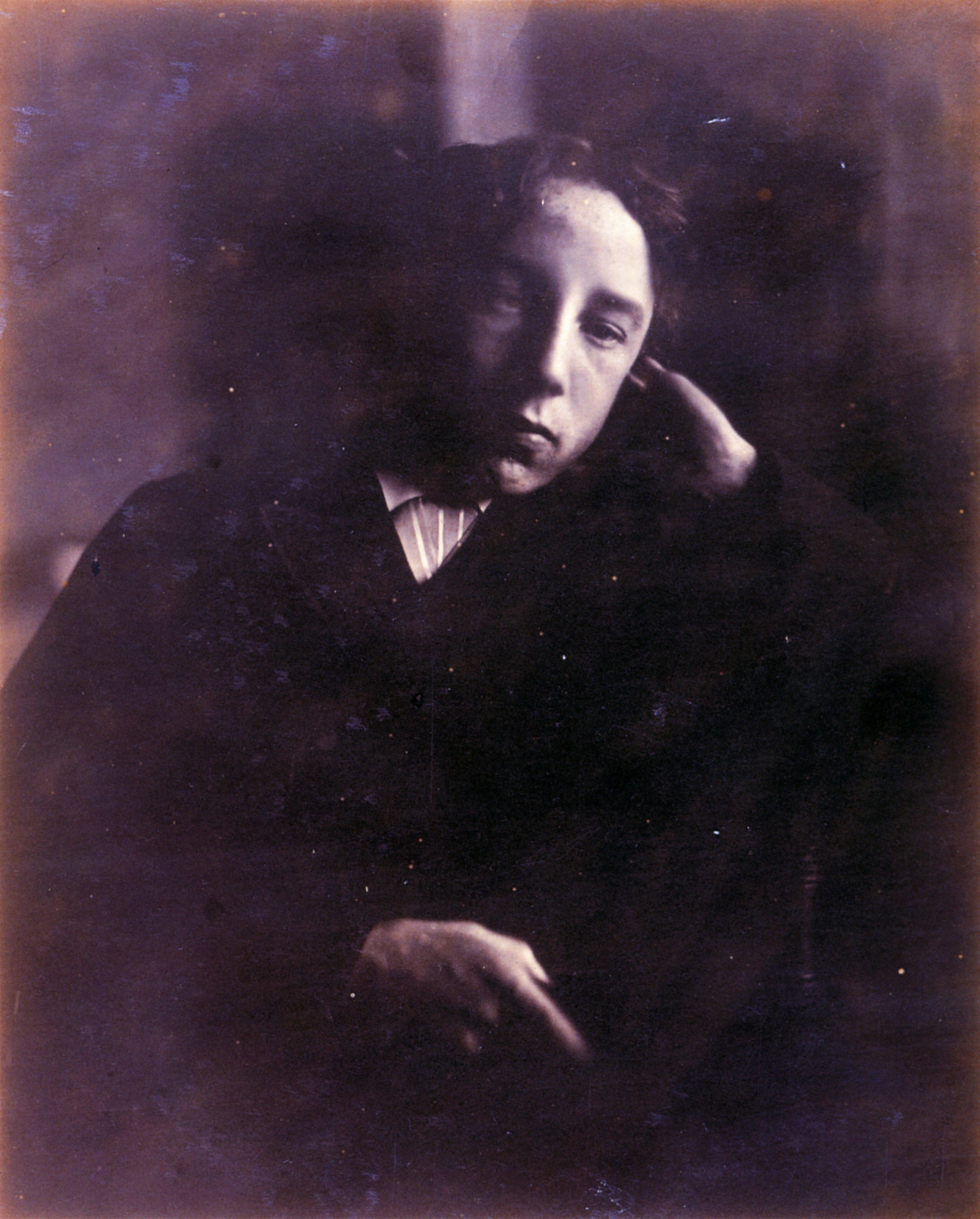
- Photograph by Julia Margaret Cameron, August 1867.
- Born: Henry Herschel Hay Cameron; 1852
- Died: 1911 (aged 58–59)
- Education: University College, Oxford
- Occupation: Photographer
- Known for: Photography
- Parents: Charles Hay Cameron (father); Julia Margaret Cameron (mother)
- Relatives: Charles Cameron (grandfather)

Henry Herschel Hay Cameron (1852 – 1911) was a British photographer and the son of Julia Margaret Cameron.

== Early life and education ==
Henry Herschel Hay Cameron, or H. H. H. Cameron, was born in East Sheen, Surrey, England in 1852. He was named after British astronomer and photochemist Sir John Herschel, a friend of his mother.

Henry was British photographer Julia Margaret Cameron's youngest son with Benthamite jurist and philosopher Charles Hay Cameron whose father was Charles Cameron, Governor of the Bahamas. Henry was also the grandson of Scottish nobleman James Hay, 15th Earl of Erroll. His older brother was named Charles Hay Cameron after his father and was born in 1849. Another one of his sibilings was Hardinge Hay Cameron. His sister Julia was the mother of British diplomat Herman Cameron Norman.

In 1865, he and his brother, Charles, entered the Charterhouse School, an independent boarding school in Surrey, England. When he was 19 years old, he was enrolled at the University College, Oxford on 23 January 1871.

Henry moved with his family members to British Ceylon (now Sri Lanka) in 1875. In Ceylon, he and his brother were coffee planters. His father had purchased an estate in what is now Sri Lanka 30 years prior to their departure while he was in service to the Crown and a member of the law commission in Calcutta. Upon his mother's death in 1879, he vacated his position at the Glencairn estate in Ceylon to return to Britain.

== Career ==
In the mid-1880s, Henry Herschel Hay Cameron launched into professional photography by opening 'The Cameron Studio' on Mortimer Street in London. He operated this studio, which specialized in portraiture, from around 1886 to 1902. At the Cameron Studio, he showcased a collection of his mother's work, including portraits of Tennyson, Browning, Longfellow, Lowell, Darwin, Herschel, and others. He also put her original camera on display.

Cameron was a founding member of The Linked Ring, a British photographic society, established in 1892.

In 1905, Cameron left photography behind to start a career in theater.

== Death ==
Henry Herschel Hay Cameron died on 7 February 1911 in Croydon, South London, England.

== Gallery ==
Photos by Henry Herschel Hay Cameron

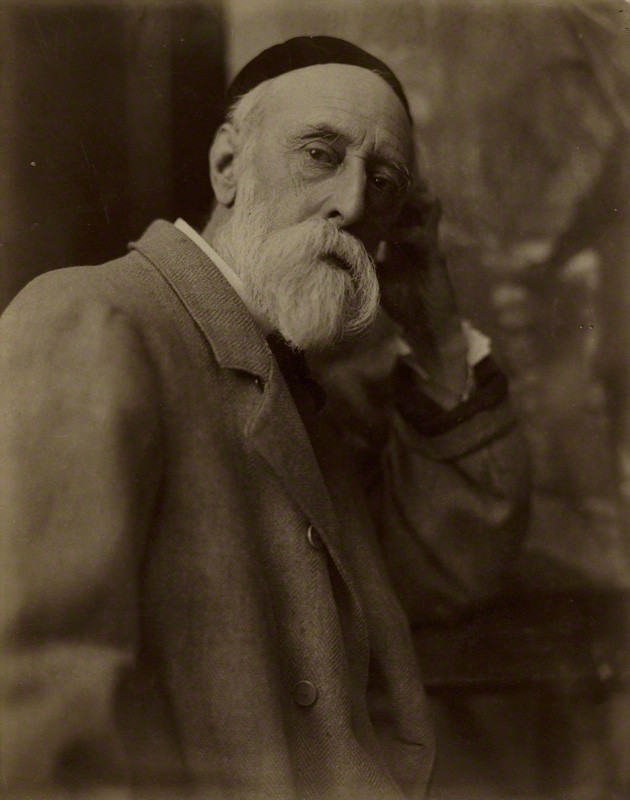
George Frederic Watts

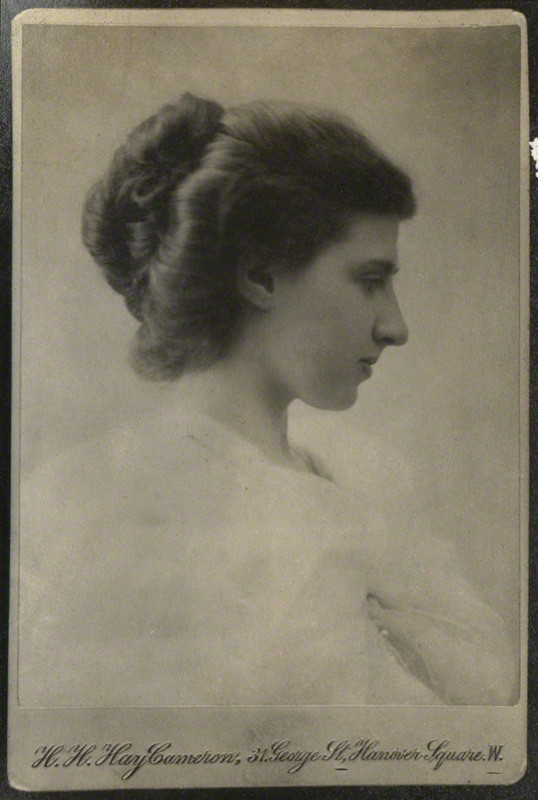
Lady Ottoline Morrell

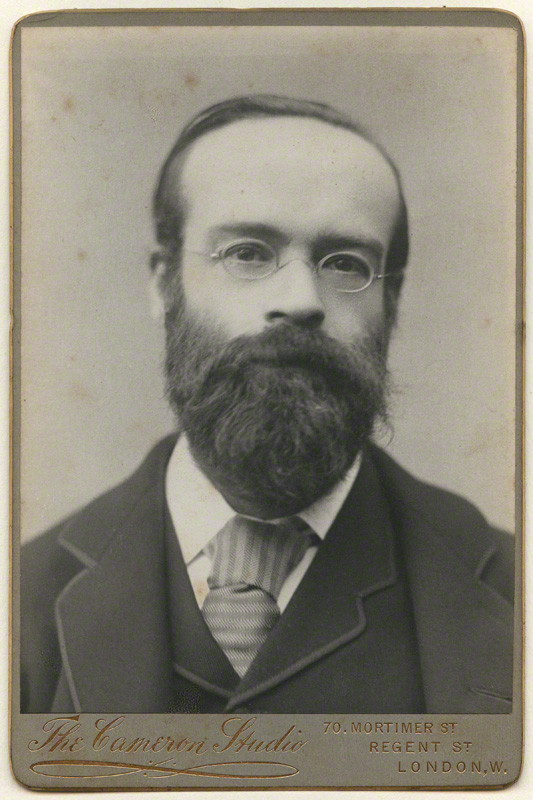
Walter Leaf

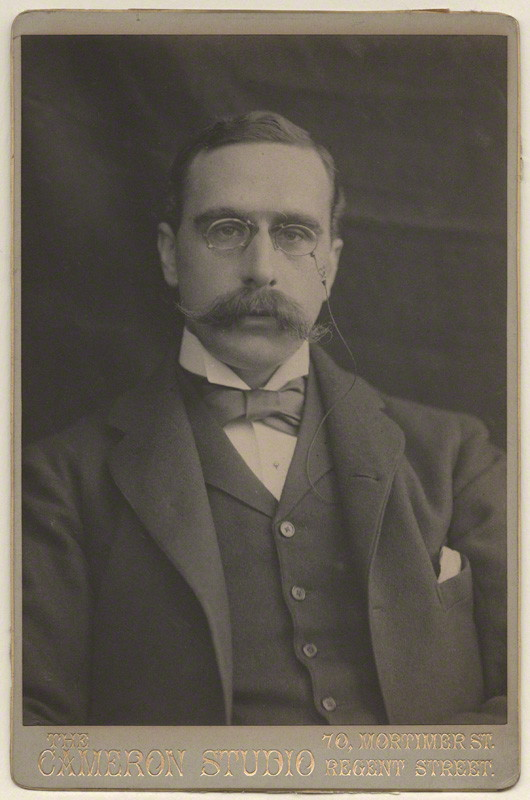
Leonard Cecil Colin Lindsay

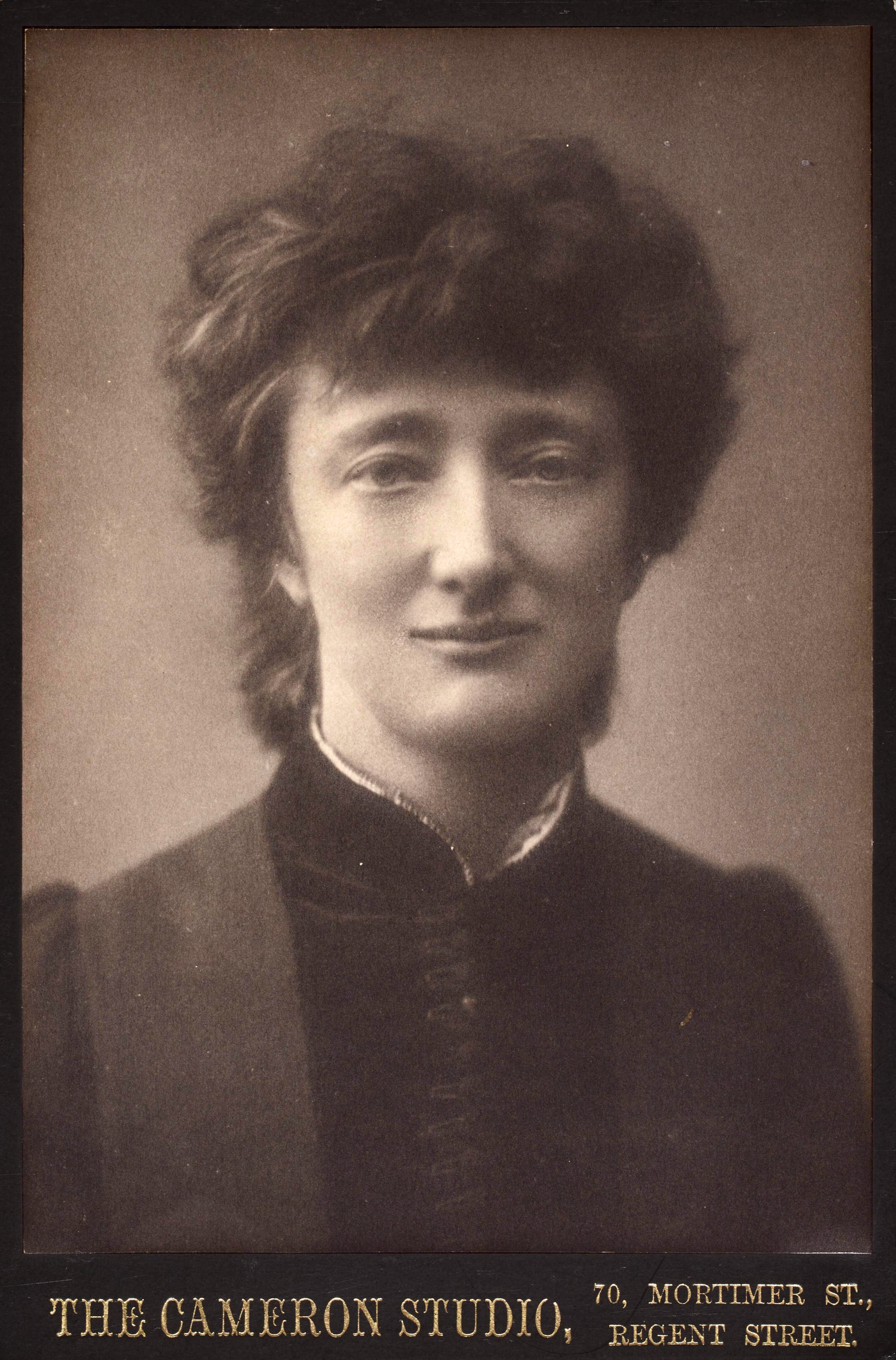
Alice Stopford Green
