= Ernest Myers (author) =

British poet, Classicist and author (1844 - 1921)

Ernest James Myers (born at Keswick 13 October 1844; died at Etchingham, Sussex, 25 November 1921), was a British poet, Classicist and author. He was the second son of the Rev. Frederic Myers, author of Catholic Thoughts, and Susan Harriett Myers (née Marshall). His elder brother was F W H Myers, the poet, critic and psychical researcher.

== Early life ==
Educated at Cheltenham and Balliol College, Oxford, (where he won the Gaisford Prize for Greek Verse in 1865), Ernest Myers became a fellow of Wadham College in 1868, teaching there for three years. In 1871, he moved to London, joining the Inner Temple and being called to the bar; however, he never practised as a barrister. Instead, he made his living as a translator and editor and also joined the committees of organisations such as the University Extension Society, the Charity Organisation Society, the Society for the Protection of Women & Children, and the Hellenic Society of which he was a founder member.

== Writing ==
Myers published poetry in The Puritans (1869), translated the Odes of Pindar (1874), followed in 1877 by a volume entitled Poems. A further, larger volume of his own poetry followed in 1880, The Defence of Rome and Other Poems, and he contributed an article on Aeschylus to a collection of Classical essays edited by Evelyn Abbott.

In 1882 he collaborated with Andrew Lang and Walter Leaf on books XVII-XXIV of Homer's Iliad (a companion volume to a translation of the Odyssey).

Further volumes of poetry followed in the coming years: The Judgement of Prometheus (1886); and Gathered Poems (1904). He also wrote Lord Althorp: a biography (1890).

== Family ==
In London, in 1883, Myers married Nora Margaret Lodge (1858–1952) (a sister of George Edward Lodge), and they had five children. The family moved from London to Chislehurst in 1891. Their elder son - who may have been the subject of Myers’ poem Infant Eyes - died as a soldier in France in 1918, the last year of World War I. Their son Rollo Hugh Myers, born in 1892, became a music critic, author and translator.

Myers maintained a love of physical exercise throughout his life, including swimming, riding, lawn tennis, walking, and golf. He died on 25 November 1921 at Etchingham, Sussex, aged 77.

== Works ==
- The Puritans
