= The Red Romance Book =

First edition

The Red Romance Book: Tales of Knights, Dragons & High Adventure (or The Red Book of Romance) is a book of heroic tales and legends. It was edited by Andrew Lang with illustrations by Henry J. Ford, and published in London by Longmans, Green, and Co. in 1905. The tales were generally taken from sagas and chivalric romances such as The Story of Burnt Njal, The Faerie Queene, Don Quixote and Orlando Furioso. They are about such legendary characters as Bevis of Hampton, Huon of Bordeaux, Ogier the Dane and Guy of Warwick. Some are literary fantasies, while others, such as the story of El Cid, have a basis in historical fact.

== Contents ==
The 1905 edition of the book included:

- How William of Palermo was carried off by the Werwolf
- The Disenchantment of the Werwolf
- The Slaying of Hallgerda's Husbands
- The Death of Gunnar
- Njal's Burning
- The Lady of Solace
- Una and the Lion
- How the Red Cross Knight slew the Dragon
- Amys and Amyle
- The Tale of the Cid
- The Knight of the Sorrowful Countenance
- The Adventure of the Two Armies who turned out to be Flocks of Sheep
- The Adventure of the Bobbing Lights
- The Helmet of Mambrino
- How Don Quixote was Enchanted while guarding the Castle
- Don Quixote's Home-coming
- The Meeting of Huon and Oberon, King of the Fairies
- How Oberon saved Huon
- Havelok and Goldborough
- Cupid and Psyche
- Sir Bevis the Strong
- Ogier the Dane
- How the Ass became a Man again
- Guy of Warwick
- How Bradamante conquered the Wizard
- The Ring of Bradamante
- The Fulfilling of the Prophecy
- The Knight of the Sun
- How the Knight of the Sun rescued his Father
