= Walter Leaf =

English banker (1852–1927)

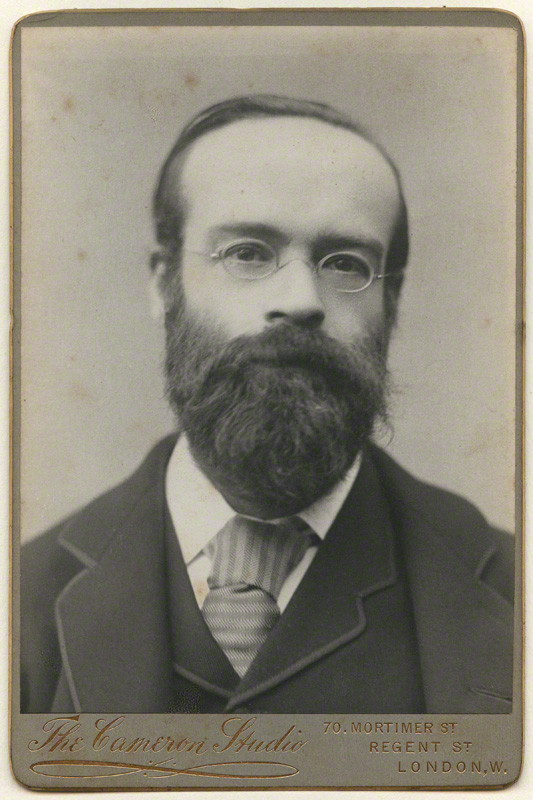
- Walter Leaf Henry Herschel Hay Cameron, 1891
- Born: 26 November 1852; Upper Norwood (Croydon)
- Died: 8 March 1927 (aged 74); Torquay, Devon
- Occupations: Banker, classical scholar, psychical researcher
- Parent(s): Charles John Leaf (1826–1897); Isabella Ellen Leaf, née Tyas (1830–1902)

Sir Walter Leaf (26 November 1852, Upper Norwood – 8 March 1927, Torquay) was an English banker, classical scholar, and psychical researcher. He published a benchmark edition of Homer's Iliad and was a director of Westminster Bank for many years, eventually becoming its chairman. He was a co-founder and later president of the International Chamber of Commerce and served as president of the Institute of Bankers, the Hellenic Society, and the Classical Association. He married Charlotte Symonds, the daughter of John Addington Symonds. He was a Cambridge Apostle.

== Academic career ==
Walter Leaf was born on 26 November 1852. In 1865, he won a scholarship to Winchester College. However, his parents became concerned that living conditions at Winchester would be unacceptable, so they rented a house at Harrow on the edge of London, where their son enrolled in April 1866 at Harrow School as a day pupil. From Harrow, he progressed to Trinity College, Cambridge. He won a scholarship to Trinity in 1870, became a senior classic in 1874, and was elected to a fellowship the following year. He was concerned with uncovering the physical reality of the classical world, in contrast to the Cambridge Ritualists, and was the foremost Homer scholar of his generation. His edition of the Iliad was published in two volumes (1886–1888) and was regarded for several decades as the best English edition of Homer's epic poem. Leaf also translated works from Russian and Persian, and was fluent in several European languages, including French, Italian, and German. He was president of the Hellenic Society and the Classical Association. He also took an interest in ancient geography.

== Banking ==
In 1877, he entered the family textile firm, becoming chairman of Leaf & Company Ltd. in 1888. In 1892, Leaf & Co. merged with Pawson & Co. to become Pawsons and Leafs Limited. Walter became a director of what would become Westminster Bank in 1891 and its chairman from 1918 until his death. From 1919 to 1921, he was president of the Institute of Bankers. He worked tirelessly for the International Chamber of Commerce, of which he was a co-founder in 1919 and elected president in 1925.

== Psychical research ==
Leaf was a member of the Society for Psychical Research. He translated Vsevolod Solovyov's A Modern Priestess of Isis (1895).

Leaf studied the medium, Leonora Piper. He did not believe that the personality of a person could survive death but came to the conclusion that "memories of the dead survive and are under special conditions accessible to us." This was in opposition to sceptics such as psychologist G. Stanley Hall, who described her mediumship as a case of secondary personality.

== Death ==
It was his doctor who early in 1927 recommended him to visit Torquay, in the south-west of England, for the sake of his health. After a few weeks he died there, however. His funeral ceremony was conducted by the Archbishop of Canterbury.

== Publications ==
- The Iliad of Homer: Done into English Prose (1892, 1911) [with Andrew Lang and Ernest Myers]
- A Companion to the Iliad for English Readers (1892)
- A Modern Priestess of Isis (1895) [with Vsevolod Solovyov]
- Versions from Hafiz, an essay in Persian metre (Alexander Moring, Ltd.) (1898)
- Troy: A Study in Homeric Geography (1912)
- Homer and History (1915)
- Quatrains From the Greek (1919)
- Little Poems From the Greek (1922)
- Strabo on the Troad (1923)
- Banking (1927)
- Walter Leaf, 1852–1927: Some Chapters of Autobiography (1932) [with Charlotte Mary Symonds Leaf]
