= The Library (book) =

19th-century book

The Library by Andrew Lang is a late 19th-century book published by McMillan & Co. as part of the “Art as Home” series. Continuing the tradition of de Bury’s The Philobiblon and Dibdin’s Bibliomania, The Library is a half-serious look at the craft of book-collecting for the amateur bibliophile.

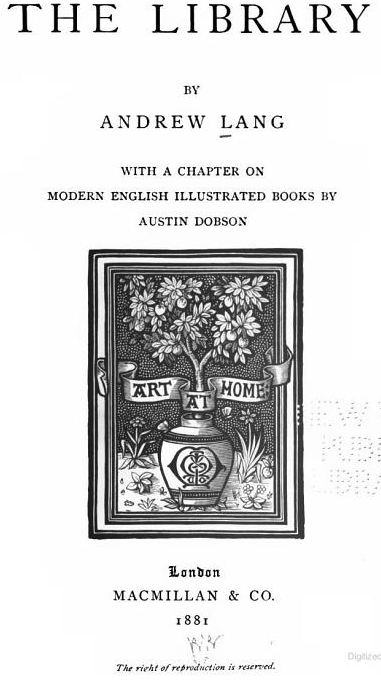
Title page to The Library by Andrew Lang

Lang begins his book with a quote from Thomas Frognall Dibdin:

"All men," says Dr. Dibdin, "like to be their own librarians." A writer on the library has no business to lay down the law as to the books that even the most inexperienced amateurs should try to collect. There are books which no lover of literature can afford to be without; classics, ancient and modern, on which the world has pronounced its verdict. These works, in whatever shape we may be able to possess them, are the necessary foundations of even the smallest collections. Homer, Dante and Milton Shakespeare and Sophocles, Aristophanes and Moliere, Thucydides, Tacitus, and Gibbon, Swift and Scott, these every lover of letters will desire to possess in the original languages or in translations. The list of such classics is short indeed, and when we go beyond it, the tastes of men begin to differ very widely.

Lang’s book is at both an investigation of the “gentle-madness” of book collecting and a staunch defense of its practice. Lang writes:

This apology must be followed by a brief defence of the taste and passion of book-collecting, and of the class of men known invidiously as bookworms and bookhunters. They and their simple pleasures are the butts of a cheap and shrewish set of critics, who cannot endure in others a taste which is absent in themselves. Important new books have actually been condemned of late years because they were printed on good paper, and a valuable historical treatise was attacked by reviewers quite angrily because its outward array was not mean and forbidding. Of course, critics who take this view of new books have no patience with persons who care for "margins," and "condition," and early copies of old books. We cannot hope to convert the adversary, but it is not necessary to be disturbed by his clamour. People are happier for the possession of a taste as long as they possess it, and it does not, like the demons of Scripture, possess them. The wise collector gets instruction and pleasure from his pursuit, and it may well be that, in the long run, he and his family do not lose money. The amusement may chance to prove a very fair investment.

At times, Lang describes book-hunting as a sport, somewhat analogous to fishing, in which patience is paid off with a rare find. He also describes the pleasure of book-hunting through the book stalls of Paris and other cosmopolitan cities.

While often written within the language of hyperbole, Lang’s descriptive choice of words paints a picture of the collector’s love of books:

Selling books are nearly as bad as losing friends, than which life has no worse sorrow. A book is a friend whose face is constantly changing... Books change like friends, like ourselves, like everything; but they are most piquant in the contrasts they provoke, when the friend who gave them and wrote them is a success, though we laughed at him; a failure, though we believed in him; altered in any case, and estranged from his old self and old days. The vanished past returns when we look at the pages. The vicissitudes of years are printed and packed in a thin octavo, and the shivering ghosts of desire and hope return to their forbidden home in the heart and fancy. It is as well to have the power of recalling them always at hand, and to be able to take a comprehensive glance at the emotions which were so powerful and full of life, and now are more faded and of less account than the memory of the dreams of childhood. It is because our books are friends that do change, and remind us of change, that we should keep them with us, even at a little inconvenience, and not turn them adrift in the world to find a dusty asylum in cheap bookstalls. We are a part of all that we have read...

In contrast to Lang’s musings on the joys and sorrows of the bibliophile, Dobson’s treatment of illustrated manuscripts is more languid in language but factual and somewhat helpful to the amateur collector. In this chapter on illustrated English manuscripts, Dobson gives clear examples of the artwork he is describing, allowing the reader to understand and follow the development of illustration.

== Chapters ==
CHAPTER I

An Apology for the Book-hunter

" Every man his own Librarian" — Bibliography and Literature — Services of the French to Bibliography — A defence of the taste of the Book-collector — Should Collectors buy for the purpose of selling again? — The sport of Book-hunting — M. de Resbecq's anecdotes — Stories of success of Book-hunters — The lessons of old Bookstalls — Booksellers' catalogues — Auctions of Books — Different forms of the taste for collecting — The taste serviceable to critical Science — Books considered as literary relics — Examples — The ** Imitatio Christi " of J. J. Rousseau — A brief vision of mighty Book-hunters.

CHAPTER II

The Library

The size of modern collections — ^The Library in English houses — Bookcases — Enemies of Books — Damp, dust, dirt — ^The book- worm — Careless readers — Book plates — Borrowers — Book stealers — ^Affecting instance of the Spanish Monk — The Book- ghoul — Women the natural foes of books — Some touching exceptions — Homage to Madame Fertiault — Modes of pre- serving books; binding — Various sorts of coverings for books — Half-bindings — Books too good to bind, how to be entertained — Iniquities of Binders — Cruel case of a cropped play of Molière — Recipes (not infallible) for cleaning books — Necessity of possessing bibliographical works, such as catalogues.

CHAPTER III

The Books of the Collector

Manuscripts, early and late — Early Printed Books — How to recog- nise them — Books printed on Vellum — "Uncut" copies — Livres de Luxe," and Illustrated Books — Invective against "Christmas Books"— The "Hypnerotomachia Poliphili" — Old woodcuts — French vignettes of the eighteenth century — Books of the Aldi — Books of the Elzevirs — " Curious" Books — Singular old English poems — First editions — Changes of fashion in Book-collecting — Examples of the variations in prices — Books valued for their bindings, and as relics — Anecdotes of Madame du Barry and Marie Antoinette.

CHAPTER IV

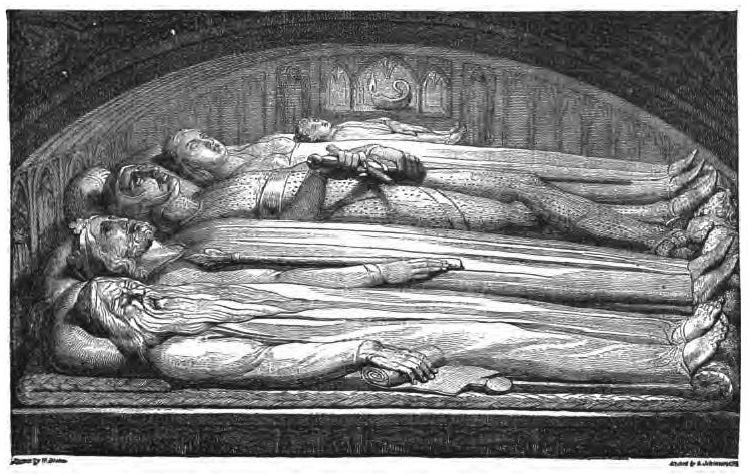
An example of a woodcut by William Blake used in The Library.

Illustrated Books

Beginnings of Modem Book -Illustration in England — Stothard, Blake, Flaxman — Boydell's Shakespeare," Macklin's "Bible," Martin's "Milton"— The " Annuals "-Rogers's "Italy" and "Poems" — Revival of Wood -Engraving — Bewick — Bewick's Pupils —The 'London School " — Progress of Wood-Engraving — Illustrated "Christmas" and other Books — The Humorous Artists — Cruikshank — Doyle — Thackeray — Leech — Tenniel — Du Maurier — Samboume — Keene — Minor Humorous Artists — Children's Books — Crane — Miss Greenaway — Caldecott — The New American School " — Conclusion
