= Paul Sylvester =

Geochemist

Paul Joseph Sylvester
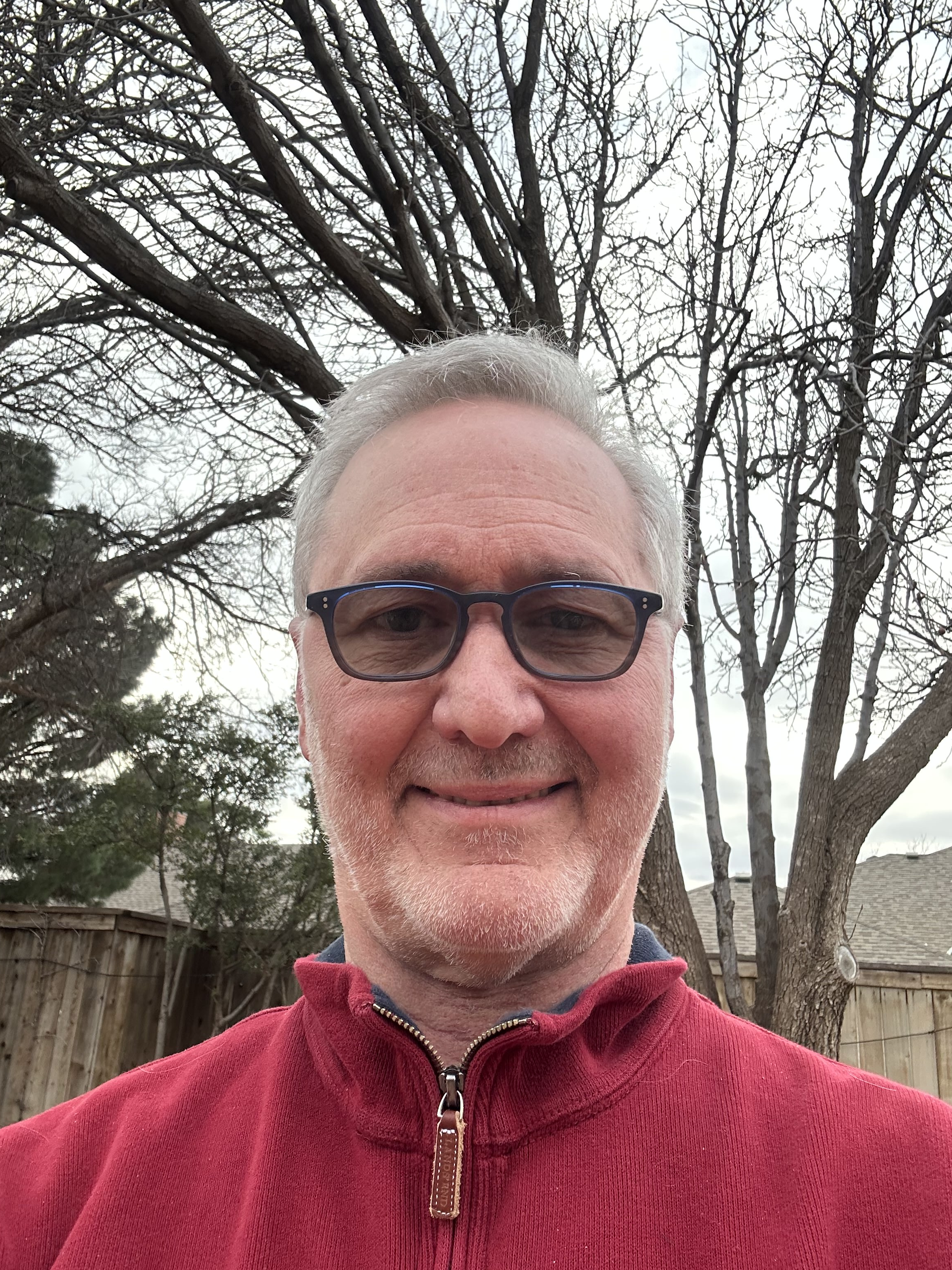
- Occupations: Geochemist, academic, editor, and author
- Title: Endowed Pevehouse Chair Professor

Academic background
- Education: Purdue University; Washington University

Academic work
- Institutions: Texas Tech University; Memorial University of Newfoundland

Paul Joseph Sylvester is a geochemist, academic, editor, and author. He is the Endowed Pevehouse Chair and Professor of Geosciences at Texas Tech University.

Sylvester is known for his work in developing analytical methods for mineral micro-analysis using LA-ICP-MS (Laser Ablation Inductively Coupled Plasma Mass Spectrometry) and for applying U-Th-Pb geochronology and Hf-Nd-Sr-Pb isotope tracing in research across various subdisciplines of the geosciences. This has included studies of crustal evolution, critical metal ore formation, igneous petrogenesis, and sedimentary provenance.

Sylvester is a Fellow of the Mineralogical Society of America, the Geological Society of America, and the Society of Economic Geologists. He was listed in Stanford University's "World's Top 2% Scientists" in 2020, ranked in the top 0.46% in the geochemistry and geophysics discipline according to their standardized citation metrics in 2023, and has an h-index of 61 as of 2025. He served as Editor-in-Chief of Minerals from 2016 to 2023, has been Joint Editor-in-Chief of Geostandards and Geoanalytical Research since 2016, and Founding Editor-in-Chief of Critical Insights in Geochemistry & Geophysics since 2024.

== Education ==
Sylvester earned his Bachelor's (B.S.) in Geology from Purdue University, West Lafayette, Indiana, in 1978, and his Doctorate (PhD) in Geochemistry from Washington University in St. Louis, in 1984.

== Career ==
Sylvester started his career as a Research Associate at NASA Johnson Space Center in the mid-1980s, later becoming a Research Management Associate at NASA Headquarters. From 1998 to 2004, he served as Associate Professor and, from 2004 to 2014, as Full Professor at Memorial University of Newfoundland. During this time, he was the Principal Investigator at the Inco Innovation Centre as well, a role he held from 2005 to 2014. He holds an appointment as Principal Investigator at the TTU MILL Mineral Isotope Laser Laboratory and, since 2014, has been a Professor and the Endowed Pevehouse Chair at Texas Tech University.

== Research ==
Sylvester has applied microbeam techniques like LA-ICP-MS and automated mineralogy (Mineral Liberation Analysis) to study the elemental and isotopic compositions of minerals, focusing on Earth's early crust, meteorites, impact melts, metal ores, and sedimentary rock provenance.

=== Mineral geochemistry and geochronology ===
Sylvester studied alkaline granites in post-collisional environments like the Alaskan Cordillera and Arabian-Nubian Shield, linking them to anorogenic and volcanic arc granites, and suggesting formation through crustal anatexis. He examined the effects of collision pressures on granite formation, revealing smaller, cooler granites in high-pressure settings like the Himalayas and larger, hotter ones in high-temperature environments like the Lachlan Fold Belt, with distinct geochemical signatures based on protolith type. Collaboratively, he developed methods for high-precision elemental analysis using ICP-MS to trace geochemical variations, supporting research on high-field strength element fractionation during the partial melting of the mantle wedge. Furthermore, he refined U–Pb zircon dating with LA-ICP-MS to near-SIMS (secondary-ion mass spectrometry) precision, applying it to detrital zircons from the Ulven Group (western Norway) and revealing a mix of Archean, Proterozoic, and early Ordovician zircons. His work established LA-ICPMS as a viable alternative to SIMS for zircon geochronology, with further analysis of Zircon 91500 confirming its utility in calibrating rare earth elements. His research also demonstrated the potential of apatite for sedimentary provenance analysis, improved U-(Th-)Pb geochronology standards for zircon, monazite, and titanite, refining uncertainty propagation and data calibration and showed how in situ analyses of Pb-isotope ratios in feldspar can be a powerful tool for understanding magmatic processes.

Sylvester's work encompassed the isotopic study of meteorites, the effects of impact melting, and the formation of early solar system materials. He utilized laser ablation MC-ICP-MS to analyze Fe isotopic variations in iron meteorites and sulfides, demonstrating its ability to detect subtle differences in small samples. His comparative studies on impact melting revealed distinct compositions in melt products from sedimentary and crystalline targets, while his research on unequilibrated ordinary chondrites suggested their formation as rapidly quenched liquids shaped by varied histories in the solar nebula. Among other works, he edited a special issue of Tectonophysics titled "Continent Formation, Growth and Recycling," which explored perspectives on continental formation, growth, and recycling through numerical models, geochronologic and isotopic studies, and global crustal growth models.

Sylvester edited the book Laser-ablation-ICPMS in the Earth Sciences: Principles and Applications (2001) for the Mineralogical Association of Canada short course series, which Philip E. Janney reviewed, stating, "I was very impressed by the depth and scope of the book." In 2023, he was guest editor of Geostandards and Geoanalytical Research's issue highlighting innovations in LA-ICP-MS methods, instrumentation, and reference materials, sparked by the pandemic's disruptions and opportunities in research.

== Awards and honors ==
- 2013 – Fellow, Mineralogical Society of America
- 2013 – Fellow, Geological Society of America
- 2024 – Fellow, Society of Economic Geologists

== Bibliography ==
=== Selected articles ===
- Sylvester, P. J. (1989). Post-collisional alkaline granites. The Journal of Geology, 97(3), 261–280.
- Eggins, S. M., Woodhead, J. D., Kinsley, L. P. J., Mortimer, G. E., Sylvester, P., McCulloch, M. T., ... & Handler, M. R. (1997). A simple method for the precise determination of≥ 40 trace elements in geological samples by ICPMS using enriched isotope internal standardisation. Chemical geology, 134(4), 311–326.
- Sylvester, P. J. (1998). Post-collisional strongly peraluminous granites. lithos, 45(1–4), 29–44.
- Wiedenbeck, M., Hanchar, J. M., Peck, W. H., Sylvester, P., Valley, J., Whitehouse, M., ... & Zheng, Y. F. (2004). Further characterisation of the 91500 zircon crystal. Geostandards and Geoanalytical Research, 28(1), 9-39.
- Horstwood, M. S., Košler, J., Gehrels, G., Jackson, S. E., McLean, N. M., Paton, C., ... & Schoene, B. (2016). Community‐derived standards for LA‐ICP‐MS U‐(Th‐) Pb geochronology–Uncertainty propagation, age interpretation and data reporting. Geostandards and Geoanalytical Research, 40(3), 311–332.

=== Selected books ===
- Continent Formation, Growth and Recycling (2000) ISBN 978-0-444-50622-1
- Laser-ablation-ICPMS in the Earth Sciences: Current Practices and Outstanding Issues (2008) ISBN 90921294498
