= Herman Norman =

British diplomat

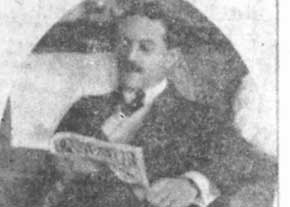
- Herman Cameron Norman
- Born: Herman Cameron Norman; 8 June 1872; London
- Died: 8 September 1955 (aged 83)
- Education: Eton College; Trinity College, Cambridge
- Occupation: Diplomat
- Parent(s): Charles Lloyd Norman; Julia Hay Cameron
- Relatives: Charles Hay Cameron (grandfather)

Herman Cameron Norman CB CSI CBE (8 June 1872 – 8 September 1955) was a British diplomat who represented Britain in Iran. He was an important figure in the lead up to 1921 coup d'état.

== Biography ==
Norman was born in London to Charles Lloyd Norman JP DL and Julia Hay Cameron, daughter of jurist Charles Hay Cameron and photographer Julia Margaret Cameron, granddaughter of Charles Cameron, Governor of the Bahamas, and granddaughter of the 15th Earl of Erroll. He was educated at Eton and Trinity College, Cambridge.

He joined the Foreign Office in 1894 and served in various positions in Cairo, Washington DC, Tokyo, St Petersburg, Buenos Aires and Constantinople between 1896 and 1916. He was part of the British delegation at the Paris Peace Conference.

He served as the British minister in Tehran from May 1920 to October 1921. Serving under Lord Curzon, he was instrumental in the ascension of Hassan Pirnia to the role of prime minister. Relations between Lord Curzon and Herman Cameron Norman became sour after Norman's tenure, so much so that Lord Curzon refused to see Herman upon his return from Tehran. Lord Curzon held the belief that Norman was singularly responsible for the failure of the British control of Iran. Norman, who did not back down from how he felt about the incompetence of Mostowfi ol-Mamalek communicated to Lord Curzon about how the current British policy towards Iran is unpopular with the Iranian population and would cause more harm for Britain in the long-run. Norman retired in 1924 after refusing the post of minister to Santiago.

Herman Norman's role in the 1921 coup d'état is unclear; however, it is argued by historian Cyrus Ghani that it is very unlikely that Norman did not know of the Persian Cossack Brigade marching from Qazvin to Tehran. The evidence that Ghani provides are the fact that the telegraphs between Norman and George Curzon, 1st Marquess Curzon of Kedleston averaged around one a day, compared to the normal three times a day; and the odd series of events which had Lieutenant-Colonel Henry Smyth order 2200 men from the Cossack Qazvin division into Tehran for disciplining unruly soldiers from the Cossack division in Tehran, and then the subsequent reversal of the order by Norman with the request of Ahmad Shah Qajar. The latter point is suspect because it would seem that the refitting of the Cossack would have been done in stages, especially due to the fact that the risk of Bolsheviks from the north of Iran was so prevalent. A motivating factor for Norman could have been the refusal of Fathollah Khan Akbar who served as prime minister of Iran to cooperate with the British regarding the 1919 agreement. This feeling might have been a result of the Anglo-Persian Agreement still not being implemented, British financial officers being hampered from doing their work, and finally the repeated difficulties in forming a competent cabinet. However, it should be mentioned that Ghani points out that Norman's involvement cannot be concretely proven, was he a pawn in Edmund Ironside's plan for a renewed Persia? was he complicit in the planning and execution of the 1921 coup d'état? or was he actually in the dark about the events that were to take place?. Ironside in his memoirs High Road to Command and his private unpublished diaries makes it very clear that he acted alone in arming and clothing the disheveled Persian Cossacks without the knowledge of the Foreign Office, Curzon or Norman to protect his rear in carrying out his orders to withdraw British forces from Iran and modern day Iraq. Peter Mallard the son of the Third Secretary in the British Legation publishing extracts from his father Victor Mallet's diary in Asian Affairs Volume 25 of 1994 makes it clear that the Legation was not aware of any British plans for a Coup.

He was appointed a member of the Royal Commission on Local Government in 1926.

== Honours ==
Norman was appointed a Commander of the Order of the British Empire (CBE) in 1917, as one of the first sets of appointments to the Order. He was appointed aa Companion of the Order of the Star of India (CSI) in the 1919 Birthday Honours, while he was Counsellor at the British Embassy in Tokyo, for meritorious services connected with the war. He was appointed a Companion of the Order of the Bath in the 1920 Birthday Honours.

Diplomatic posts
Preceded by Sir Percy Cox a.i.	British Envoy Extraordinary and Minister Plenipotentiary to Iran; 1920 – 1921	Succeeded by Sir Percy Loraine, Bt.
