= 1836 in poetry =

List of years in poetry	(table)
- … 1826; 1827; 1828; 1829; 1830; 1831; 1832; 1833; 1834; 1835; 1836; 1837; 1838; 1839; 1840; 1841; 1842; 1843; 1844; 1845; 1846 …
- In literature 1833 1834 1835 1836 1837 1838 1839
- Art; Archaeology; Architecture; Literature; Music; Philosophy; Science; +...

Nationality words link to articles with information on the nation's poetry or literature (for instance, Irish or France).

== Events ==
- 6 November – The burial of Czech romantic poet Karel Hynek Mácha (in a pauper's grave) takes place on what should have been the day of his wedding to Eleonora Šomková, about a month after the birth of their child. Mácha had overexerted himself in helping put out a fire and died the previous day in Litoměřice just before his 26th birthday.
- The literary, social and political quarterly Sovremennik (Современник, literally The Contemporary), edited by Russian poet Alexander Pushkin, begins publication in Saint Petersburg. It publishes Fyodor Tyutchev's poetry and the fourth issue contains Pushkin's historical novel The Captain's Daughter.

== Works published in English ==
=== United Kingdom ===
- Bernard Barton and Lucy Barton, The Reliquary
- Robert Browning, "Porphyria's Lover", as "Porphyria" in January issue of Monthly Repository
- Letitia Elizabeth Landon, writing under the pen name "L.E.L.", Fisher's Drawing Room Scrap Book, dated 1837
- Walter Savage Landor, A Satire on Satirists, and Admonition to Detractors
- Francis Sylvester Mahony, The Reliques of Father Prout, Irish poet
- Caroline Norton, A Voice from the Factories
- Catherine Eliza Richardson Grandmamma's Sampler; with Some Other Rhymes for Children
- William Wordsworth, The Poetical Works of William Wordsworth, published in six volumes from this year to 1837 (a revised text from Poetical Works 1827; new edition with corrections published in 1839; see also Miscellaneous Poems 1820, Poetical Works 1840, Poems 1845, Poetical Works (Centenary Edition) 1870)
- Lyra Apostolica, religious poetry anthology, including verse by John Henry Newman

=== United States ===
- Elizabeth Margaret Chandler, Poetical Works, anti-slavery and descriptive poems, including "The Captured Slave" and "The Sunset Hour"; published posthumously
- Oliver Wendell Holmes Sr., Poems, early verse in the author's first poetry book, much of it humorous, such as "Ballad of the Oysterman" and "My Aunt", but other pieces with pathos, such as "The Last Leaf" and "Old Ironsides"
- John Greenleaf Whittier, "Mogg Megone", a critically well-received poem about Native Americans in Maine and the relationship of Indians and Catholic missionaries

== Works published in other languages ==
- Girolamo de Rada, Këngët e Milosaos, Arbëresh
- Andreas Munch, Ephemerer, Norwegian
- France Prešeren, The Baptism on the Savica (Krst pri Savici), Slovene

== Births ==
Death years link to the corresponding "[year] in poetry" article:

- 3 January – Annie Hawks (died 1918), American poet and hymnist
- 15 January – Frances Laughton Mace (died 1899), American
- 15 February – Matsudaira Katamori 松平容保 (died 1893), Japanese samurai and poet in the last days of the Edo period and the early to mid Meiji period (surname: Matsudaira)
- 17 February – Gustavo Adolfo Bécquer (died 1870), Spanish Andalusian poet and short-story writer
- 22 June – Annie Louisa Walker (died 1907), English and Canadian poet and novelist
- 11 August – Sarah Morgan Bryan Piatt (died 1919), American
- 25 August – Bret Harte (died 1902), American poet and writer
- 4 September – Marion Juliet Mitchell (died 1917), American
- 11 November – Thomas Bailey Aldrich (died 1907), American poet and editor
- 18 November – W. S. Gilbert (died 1911), English comic poet and librettist
- 28 November – Amelia Denis de Icaza (died 1911), Panamanian
- 4 December (probable date) – Duncan MacGregor Crerar (died 1916), Scottish
- 14 December – Frances Ridley Havergal (died 1879), English religious poet and hymnwriter

== Deaths ==
Birth years link to the corresponding "[year] in poetry" article:

- 9 January – Pierre François Lacenaire (born 1803), French poet and criminal, double murderer (guillotened)
- 5 March – William Taylor (born 1765), English man of letters
- 14 March – John Mayne (born 1759), Scottish-born poet, journalist and printer
- 4 April – John Grieve (born 1781), Scottish businessman and poet
- 20 August – Agnes Bulmer (born 1775), English religious and epic poet
- 17 October – George Colman the Younger (born 1762), English playwright and poet
- 5 November – Karel Hynek Mácha (born 1810), Czech romantic poet

== See also ==
- List of years in poetry
- List of years in literature
- 19th century in literature
- 19th century in poetry
- Golden Age of Russian Poetry (1800–1850)
- Young Germany (Junges Deutschland) a loose group of German writers from about 1830 to 1850
- List of poets
- Poetry
- List of poetry awards
