= 1842 in poetry =

List of years in poetry	(table)
- … 1832; 1833; 1834; 1835; 1836; 1837; 1838; 1839; 1840; 1841; 1842; 1843; 1844; 1845; 1846; 1847; 1848; 1849; 1850; 1851; 1852 …
- In literature 1839 1840 1841 1842 1843 1844 1845
- Art; Archaeology; Architecture; Literature; Music; Philosophy; Science; +...

Nationality words link to articles with information on the nation's poetry or literature (for instance, Irish or France).

== Events ==
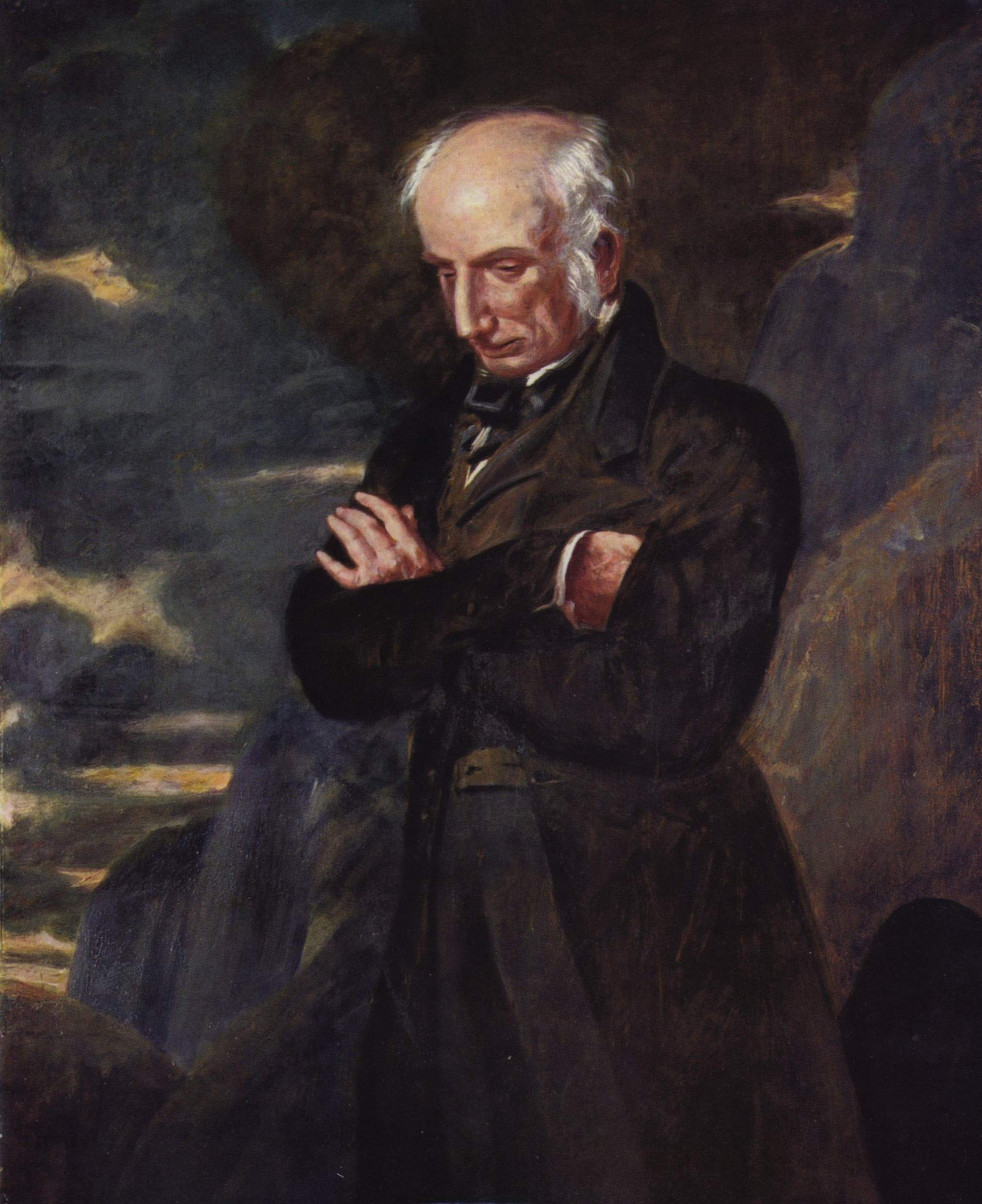
William Wordsworth, 1842, by Benjamin Haydon

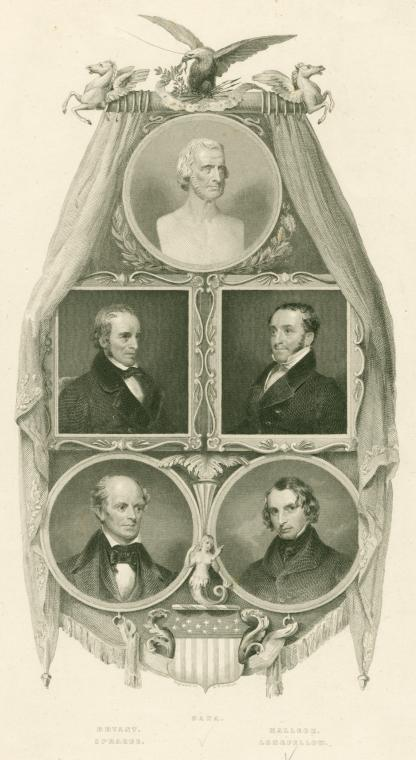
Frontispiece of Griswold's The Poets and Poetry of America, featuring images of popular poets including Richard Henry Dana Sr., William Cullen Bryant, and Henry Wadsworth Longfellow

== Works published in English ==
=== United Kingdom ===
- Robert Browning, Dramatic Lyrics, including "My Last Duchess", "The Pied Piper of Hamelin" and "Soliloquy of the Spanish Cloister"; the author's first collection of shorter poems (reprinted, with some revisions and omissions in Poems 1849; see also Bells and Pomegranates 1841, reprinted each year from 1843–1846)
- Thomas Campbell, The Pilgrim of Glencoe, with Other Poems
- Frederick William Faber, The Styrian Lake, and Other Poems
- J. O. Halliwell-Phillipps, The Nursery Rhymes of England, anthology
- Leigh Hunt, The Palfrey
- Thomas Babington Macaulay, Lays of Ancient Rome, including "Horatius"
- Robert Montgomery, Luther
- Alfred Tennyson, Poems, including "Locksley Hall", "Morte d'Arthur", "Ulysses", "Lady Clara Vere de Vere", "The Two Voices", "The Vision of Sin", "Godiva" and "The Lady of Shalott" (2nd version) (published May 14 in two volumes, with reprinted poems in Volume 1, and new poems in Volume 2)
- Katharine Augusta Ware, The Power of the Passions and other Poems
- William Wordsworth, Poems, Chiefly of Early and Late Years, includes The Bordereers

=== United States ===
- Charles Timothy Brooks, translator, Songs and Ballads, translations of German poems
- William Cullen Bryant, The Fountain and Other Poems, a collection of parts of a larger work, never to be completed; published in response to many requests for a longer, more ambitious work of poetry
- Ralph Waldo Emerson, "Saadi"
- Charles Fenno Hoffman, The Vigil of Faith and Other Poems, a popular book with four editions in three years
- Henry Wadsworth Longfellow:
  - Poems on Slavery, written in support of the abolitionist movement, dedicated to William Ellery Channing; the author donates the contents of the book to the New England Anti-Slavery Tract Society to republish and distribute
  - Ballads and Other Poems, including "The Wreck of the Hesperus"
- Alfred Billings Street, The Burning of Schenectady, and Other Poems, descriptive verses
- Rufus Wilmot Griswold, editor:
  - The Poets and Poetry of America, popular anthology that went into several reprints; with poems from over 80 authors, including Henry Wadsworth Longfellow, William Cullen Bryant, Lydia Sigourney (17 poems), Edgar Allan Poe (three poems), and Charles Fenno Hoffman (45 poems), a friend of Griswold's The collection was dedicated to Washington Allston. Philadelphia: Carey & Hart
  - Gems from American Female Poets, anthology

== Works published in other languages ==
- Théodore de Banville, Les Cariatides, France
- Sándor Petőfi (originally as Sándor Petrovics), "A borozó" (The Wine Drinker), Hungary
- Giovanni Antonio Vassallo, Il-Ġifen Tork ("The Turkish Caravel"), Malta
- Henrik Wergeland, Jøden ("The Jew"), Norway

== Births ==
Death years link to the corresponding "[year] in poetry" article:

- January 26 - François Coppée (died 1908), French writer, le poète des humbles
- February 3 - Sidney Lanier (died 1881), American
- February 4 - Arrigo Boito (died 1918), Italian
- February 25 - Karl May (died 1912), German writer, principally of adventure novels
- March 18 - Stéphane Mallarmé (died 1898), French
- June 24 - Ambrose Bierce (died c.1914), American poet and writer
- July 11 - Henry Abbey (died 1911), American poet, best known for his poem "What Do We Plant When We Plant A Tree?"
- July 17 - William John Courthope (died 1917), English poet and historian of poetry
- August 14 - Henry Duff Traill (died 1900), English literary journalist
- October 1 - Charles Cros (died 1888), French poet and inventor
- Date not known - John Arthur Phillips (died 1907), English-born Canadian

== Deaths ==
Birth years link to the corresponding "[year] in poetry" article:

- April – Nodira (born 1792), Uzbek poet and stateswoman, executed
- May 23 – José de Espronceda (born 1808), Spanish
- June 12 – Thomas Arnold (born 1795), English, educator, historian and poet
- July 28 – Clemens Brentano (born 1778), German Romantic poet and novelist
- October 30 – Allan Cunningham (born 1784), Scottish poet and author
- December 9 – Samuel Woodworth (born 1785), American author, literary journalist, playwright, librettist and poet
- Date not known – Macdonald Clarke (born 1798), American "Mad Poet"

== See also ==
- 19th century in poetry
- 19th century in literature
- List of years in poetry
- List of years in literature
- Victorian literature
- French literature of the 19th century
- Biedermeier era of German literature
- Golden Age of Russian Poetry (1800–1850)
- Young Germany (Junges Deutschland) a loose group of German writers from about 1830 to 1850
- List of poets
- Poetry
- List of poetry awards
