= 1839 in poetry =

List of years in poetry	(table)
- … 1829; 1830; 1831; 1832; 1833; 1834; 1835; 1836; 1837; 1838; 1839; 1840; 1841; 1842; 1843; 1844; 1845; 1846; 1847; 1848; 1849 …
- In literature 1836 1837 1838 1839 1840 1841 1842
- Art; Archaeology; Architecture; Literature; Music; Philosophy; Science; +...

Nationality words link to articles with information on the nation's poetry or literature (for instance, Irish or France).

== Events ==
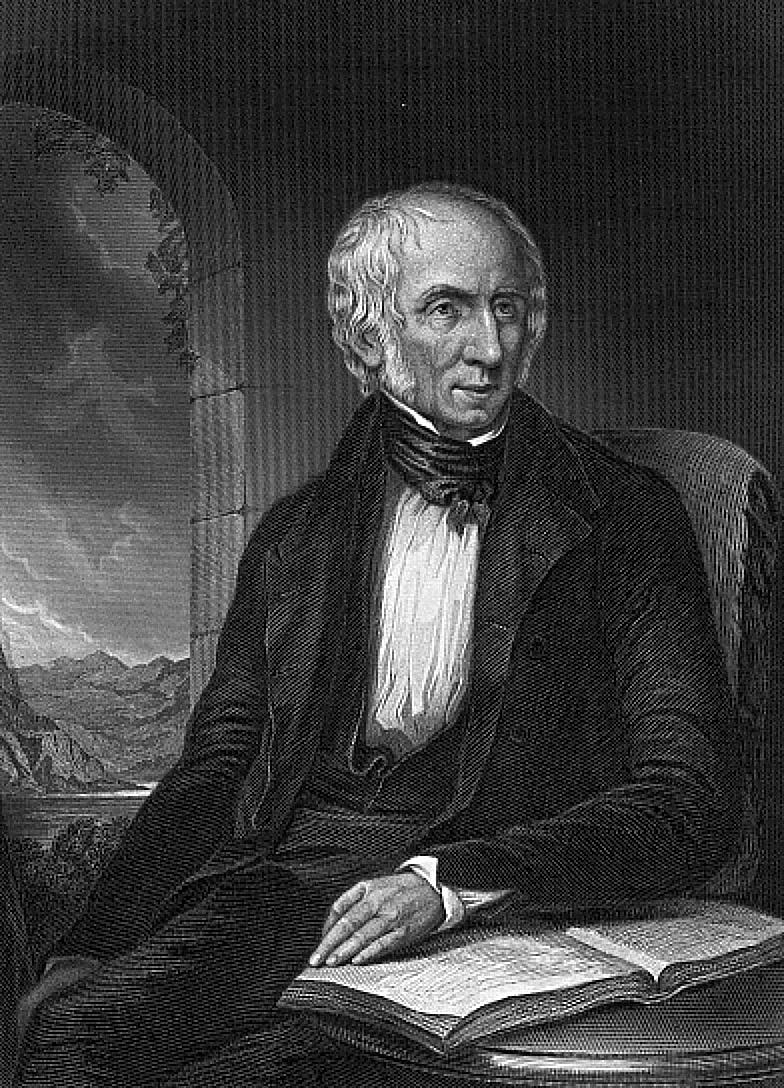
William Wordsworth, reproduced from Margaret Gillies' 1839 original

- William Wordsworth granted an honorary Doctor of Civil Law degree by Oxford University.

== Works published ==
=== United Kingdom ===
- Philip James Bailey, Festus, reprinted in numerous editions up to 1889, when the 50th anniversary edition was published
- Thomas De Quincey, biographical essays on the Lake Poets in the series Recollections of the Lake Poets, in Tait's Edinburgh Magazine (see also Recollections 1834, 1835, 1840):
  - "William Wordsworth," January, February, and April
  - "William Wordsworth and Robert Southey," July
  - "Southey, Wordsworth, and Coleridge," August
  - "Recollections of Grasmere," September
  - "The Saracen's Head," December
- William Gaskell, Temperance Rhymes
- Henry Hart Milman, Poetical Works
- Percy Bysshe Shelley, posthumous works (died 1822):
  - The Poetical Works of Percy Bysshe Shelley in four volumes is published from January to May, edited by Mary Shelley, with her preface and notes, and dedicated to the Shelleys' son, Percy Florence Shelley; London: Edward Moxon (reprinted in 1847)
  - England in 1819, a political sonnet composed in 1819, first published
- The 'Pearl Poet', Sir Gawain and the Green Knight, a late 14th-century Middle English alliterative romance first published complete, in Syr Gawayne: a collection of ancient romance-poems by Scottish and English authors relating to that celebrated knight of the Round Table edited by Frederic Madden for the Bannatyne Club

=== United States ===
- Ralph Waldo Emerson:
  - "Each and All", a poem calling Nature "the perfect whole"
  - "The Humble-Bee", praising the "yellow breeched philosopher"
  - "The Rhodora"
- Henry Wadsworth Longfellow, Voices of the Night, the author's first volume of original poetry; includes "A Psalm of Life" and "Light of the Stars"
- Edgar Allan Poe, The Haunted Palace, an allegory of mental states; considered one of the author's best poems, written at a time when his finances forced him to concentrate on stories rather than poetry; originally published in the Baltimore Museum and later included in "The Fall of the House of Usher"
- William Gilmore Simms, Southern Passages and Pictures, lyrical, sentimental and descriptive poems; New York
- Jones Very, Essays and Poems, prose and poetry

=== Other ===
- Bjarni Thorarensen, Íslands minni, Iceland
- Cláudio Manuel da Costa, Vila Rica, posthumous, Brazil
- Girolamo de Rada, Serafina Topia, Arbëresh
- Marceline Desbordes-Valmore, Pauvres Fleurs, France
- Gooru Churun Dutt, School Hours or Poems Composed at School, Calcutta: T. B. Scott and Co.; India, Indian poetry in English

== Births ==
Death years link to the corresponding "[year] in poetry" article:

- January 1 - James Ryder Randall (died 1908), American
- February 2 - Helen Marr Hurd (died 1909), American
- February 7 - William Little (died 1916), English-born Australian
- February 9 - Laura Redden Searing (died 1923), deaf American poet and journalist
- March 16 - John Butler Yeats (died 1922), Irish artist and poet, father of W. B. Yeats
- April 18 - Henry Kendall (died 1882), Australian
- June 21 - Joaquim Maria Machado de Assis (died 1909), Brazilian
- August 3 - Helen Adelia Manville (died 1912), American poet and litterateur
- August 4 - Walter Pater (died 1894), English writer on aesthetics
- August 25 - Bret Harte (died 1902), American writer of fiction and poetry
- December 30 - John Todhunter (died 1916), Irish poet and playwright
- Date not known - Velutheri Kesavan Vaidyar (died 1897), Indian, Malayalam-language poet

== Deaths ==
Birth years link to the corresponding "[year] in poetry" article:

- April 13 - Robert Millhouse (born 1788), English weaver poet
- April 22 - Thomas Haynes Bayly (born 1797), English
- May 4 - Denis Davydov (born 1784), Russian soldier-poet of the Napoleonic Wars, inventor of a specific genre, hussar poetry, noted for its hedonism and bravado
- May 21 - José María Heredia y Heredia (born 1803), Cuban poet in Mexico
- July 15 - Winthrop Mackworth Praed (born 1802), English poet
- October 11 - Leonor de Almeida Portugal (born 1750), Portuguese poet

== See also ==
- 19th century in poetry
- 19th century in literature
- List of years in poetry
- List of years in literature
- Victorian literature
- French literature of the 19th century
- Biedermeier era of German literature
- Golden Age of Russian Poetry (1800–1850)
- Young Germany (Junges Deutschland) a loose group of German writers from about 1830 to 1850
- List of poets
- Poetry
- List of poetry awards
