= 1849 in poetry =

| List of years in poetry | (table) |
- … 1839; 1840; 1841; 1842; 1843; 1844; 1845; 1846; 1847; 1848; 1849; 1850; 1851; 1852; 1853; 1854; 1855; 1856; 1857; 1858; 1859 …
- In literature 1846 1847 1848 1849 1850 1851 1852
- Art; Archaeology; Architecture; Literature; Music; Philosophy; Science; +...

Nationality words link to articles with information on the nation's poetry or literature (for instance, Irish or France).

== Events ==
- January - "What is Poetry? And What Is It Good For?" essay by John Neal published in Sartain's Union Magazine
- November 14 - A public festival is held in Denmark to celebrate the 70th birthday of Adam Gottlob Oehlenschläger
- La Tribune des Peuples, a pan-European romantic nationalist periodical, is published between March and November by Adam Mickiewicz.

== Works published ==
=== United Kingdom ===
- Cecil Frances Alexander, Moral Songs
- Matthew Arnold, writing under the pen name "A", The Strayed Reveller, and Other Poems
- William Edmondstoune Aytoun, Lays of the Scottish Cavaliers, and Other Poems
- Robert Browning, Poems, his first collected edition
- Sir Edward Bulwer-Lytton, King Arthur, first published in three parts, 1848–1849
- Edward Caswall, Lyra Catholica
- A. H. Clough, Ambarvalia
- Robert Southey, all posthumously published:
  - Southey's Common-place Book: First Series, and Second Series (each series in a separate volume), edited by John Wood Warter, poetry and prose
  - The Life and Correspondence of the Late Robert Southey, edited by Cuthbert Southey, biography
- Isaac Williams, The Christian Scholar

=== United States ===
- William Ellery Channing, The Woodman
- James T. Fields, Poems, Boston: William D. Ticknor and Company
- Caroline Howard Gilman, Verses of a Life-time
- Henry Beck Hirst, The Penance of Roland
- Oliver Wendell Holmes, Poems
- Richard Henry Stoddard, Foot-Prints
- Alfred Billings Street, Frontenac

=== Other ===
- Carl Jonas Love Almqvist, Songes, Sweden
- Petrus Augustus de Genestet, De Sint-Nicolaasavond ("Saint Nicholas's Eve"), Netherlands
- Micah Joseph Lebensohn, Harisut Troya, translation of Virgil's Aeneid after Schiller, Lithuania, Hebrew language
- Elias Lönnrot, comp., Kalevala, new version, Finland
- Fazal Shah Sayyad, Sohni Mahiwal, India, Punjabi language
- Christian Winther, Til Een ("To Someone"), Denmark

== Births ==
Death years link to the corresponding "[year] in poetry" article:

- July 22 - Emma Lazarus (died 1887), American
- July 30 - Lettie S. Bigelow (died 1906), American
- August 1 - William Larminie (died 1900), Irish poet and folklorist
- August 23 - William Ernest Henley (died 1903), English poet, critic and editor
- September 3 - Sarah Orne Jewett (died 1909), American regional fiction writer and poet
- September 21 - Edmund Gosse (died 1928), English poet, critic and memoirist
- October 7 - James Whitcomb Riley (died 1916), American dialect poet
- November 18 - Libbie C. Riley Baer (died 1929), American patriotic poet
- December 23 - Stine Andresen (died 1927), German

== Deaths ==
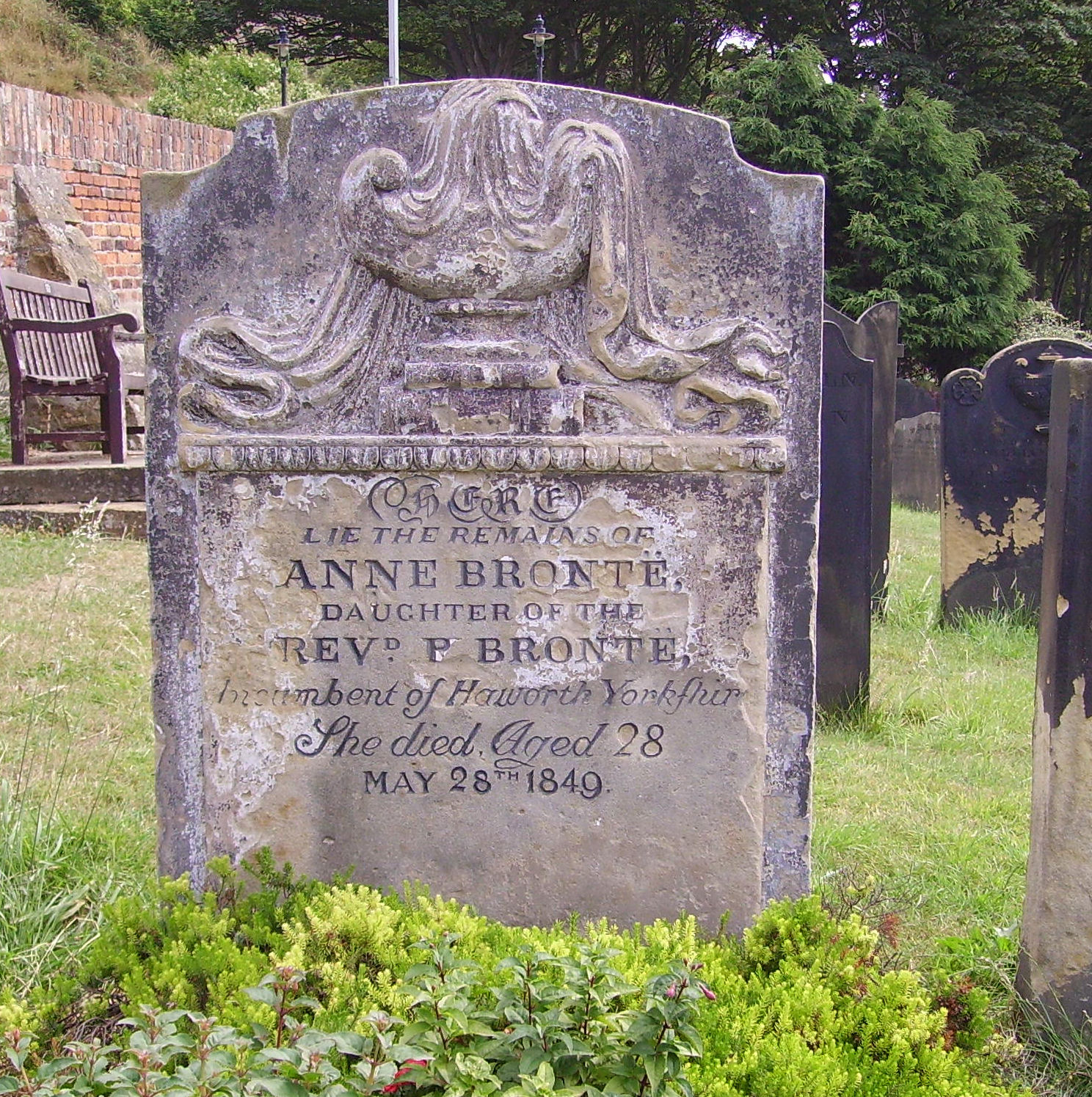
Grave of Anne Brontë

Birth years link to the corresponding "[year] in poetry" article:

- January 6 - Hartley Coleridge (born 1796), English poet and writer
- January 26 - Thomas Lovell Beddoes (born 1803), English poet, dramatist and physician
- February 8 - France Prešeren (born 1800), Slovenian Romantic poet
- February 19 - Bernard Barton (born 1784), English Quaker poet
- May 28 - Anne Brontë (born 1820), English novelist and poet (tuberculosis)
- June 20 - James Clarence Mangan (born 1803), Irish poet (cholera)
- July 7 - Goffredo Mameli (born 1827), Italian patriot and poet
- July 31 - Sándor Petőfi (born 1823), Hungarian poet and revolutionary (probably killed in Battle of Segesvár)
- October 7 - Edgar Allan Poe (born 1809), American short-story writer, poet and editor
- December 1 - Ebenezer Elliott (born 1781), English "Corn Law rhymer"
- date unknown — Cynthia Taggart (born 1801), American poet

== See also ==
- 19th century in poetry
- 19th century in literature
- List of years in poetry
- List of years in literature
- Victorian literature
- French literature of the 19th century
- Golden Age of Russian Poetry (1800–1850)
- Young Germany (Junges Deutschland) a loose group of German writers from about 1830 to 1850
- List of poets
- Poetry
- List of poetry awards
