= 1840 in poetry =

List of years in poetry	(table)
- … 1830; 1831; 1832; 1833; 1834; 1835; 1836; 1837; 1838; 1839; 1840; 1841; 1842; 1843; 1844; 1845; 1846; 1847; 1848; 1849; 1850 …
- In literature 1837 1838 1839 1840 1841 1842 1843
- Art; Archaeology; Architecture; Literature; Music; Philosophy; Science; +...

Nationality words link to articles with information on the nation's poetry or literature (for instance, Irish or France).

== Events ==
- The Percy Society is established in Britain to publish scholarly editions of early ballads, poems and other works in English.

== Works published in English ==
=== United Kingdom ===
- Thomas Aird, Orthuriel, and Other Poems
- Matthew Arnold, Alaric at Rome
- Robert Browning, Sordello
- Caroline Clive, under the pen name "V", IX Poems by 'V'
- Thomas De Quincey, Recollections of the Lake Poets, final two essays on the Lake Poets published in Tait's Edinburgh Magazine (first essay published in 1836; see also Recollections 1835, 1839):
  - "Westmoreland and the Dalesmen," January
  - "Society of the Lakes, I, II, and III," January, March, and June
- Frederick William Faber, The Cherwell Water-Lily, and Other Poems
- Monckton Milnes, Poetry for the People
- Thomas Moore, The Poetical Works of Thomas Moore, in 10 volumes, published starting this year and ending in 1841; Irish poet published in the United Kingdom
- Robert Owen, The Social Bible
- Percy Bysshe Shelley (died 1822), edited by Mary Shelley, Essays, Letters from Abroad, Translations and Fragments, including the essay "Defence of Poetry"
- William Wordsworth, The Poetical Works of William Wordsworth, six volumes (see also reprint of 1842 with a seventh volume of additional poems; Miscellaneous Poems 1820; Poetical Works 1827; Poetical Works 1836; Poems 1845; Poetical Works 1857; Poetical Works, Centenary Edition, 1870)

=== Other in English ===
- Philip Pendleton Cooke, "Florence Vane", a popular ballad, often anthologized, written for the author's cousin; first published in Burton's Gentleman's Magazine at Edgar Allan Poe's request; United States
- Thomas Moore, The Poetical Works of Thomas Moore, in 10 volumes, published starting this year and ending in 1841; Irish poet published in the United Kingdom
- Frances Sargent Osgood, The Casket of Fate, United States
- Henry Wadsworth Longfellow, "The Wreck of the Hesperus", in New World, January 10, United States

== Works published in other languages ==
- Hans Christian Andersen, Jeg er en Skandinav ("I am a Scandinavian"), Denmark
- José de Espronceda, Poesías, including complete version of El estudiante de Salamanca, Spain
- Abraham Emanuel Fröhlich, Ulrich Zwingli, Switzerland
- Victor Hugo, Les Rayons et les Ombres ("Beams and shadows"), France
- Mikhail Lermontov, Mtsyri ("The Novice"), Russia
- Taras Shevchenko, Kobzar ("The Bard"), Russia
- Henrik Wergeland, Jan van Huysums Blomsterstykke ("Flower-piece by Jan van Huysum"), Norway

== Births ==
Death years link to the corresponding "[year] in poetry" article:

- January 13 – Nicholas Flood Davin (died 1901), Irish-born Canadian lawyer, journalist, politician and poet
- January 18 – Henry Austin Dobson (died 1921), English poet and essayist
- February 2 – Griffith Williams (Gutyn Peris) (died 1838), Welsh poet
- March 5 – Constance Fenimore Woolson (died 1894), American novelist, short-story writer and poet; a grandniece of James Fenimore Cooper
- March 18 – William Cosmo Monkhouse (died 1901), English poet and critic
- June 2 – Thomas Hardy (died 1928), English novelist and poet
- August 17 – Wilfred Scawen Blunt (died 1922), English poet and writer
- September 20 – Ellen Mary Clerke (died 1906), Irish author, journalist, poet and science writer
- October 5 – John Addington Symonds (died 1893), English poet and literary critic

== Deaths ==
Death years link to the corresponding "[year] in poetry" article:

- June 7 – Népomucène Lemercier (born 1771), French poet and playwright
- June 12 – Gerald Griffin (born 1803), Irish novelist, poet and playwright
- July – Goronwy Owen (born 1723), Welsh poet
- July 7 – Nikolai Stankevich (born 1813), Russian philosopher and poet

== See also ==
- 19th century in poetry
- 19th century in literature
- List of years in poetry
- List of years in literature
- Victorian literature
- French literature of the 19th century
- Biedermeier era of German literature
- List of years in poetry
- Golden Age of Russian Poetry (1800–1850)
- Young Germany (Junges Deutschland) a loose group of German writers from about 1830 to 1850
- List of poets
- Poetry
- List of poetry awards
