= 1909 in poetry =

Nationality words link to articles with information on the nation's poetry or literature (for instance, Irish or France).

== Events ==
- February – Founding of the Poetry Recital Society, later the Poetry Society, in London.
- July 1 – English poets F. M. Cornford and Frances Darwin marry.
- T. E. Hulme leaves the Poets' Club, and starts meeting with F. S. Flint and other poets in a new group which Hulme refers to as the 'Secession Club'; they meet at the Eiffel Tower restaurant in London's Soho district to discuss plans to reform contemporary poetry through the introduction of free verse, tanka and haiku, and the removal of all unnecessary verbiage from poems. In April, Ezra Pound is introduced to the group and joins it.

== Works published in English ==
=== Canada ===
- May Austin Low, Confession, and Other Verses.
- Tom MacInnes, Lonesome Bar and Other Poems (much of the book was reprinted in In Amber Lands 1910)
- Robert W. Service, Ballads of a Cheechako
- E. W. Thomson, The Many-Mansioned House and Other Poems

=== United Kingdom ===
- Laurence Binyon, England, and Other Poems
- A. C. Bradley, Oxford Lectures on Poetry, criticism
- Joseph Campbell, The Mountainy Singer
- Roby Datta, Echoes from the East and West to which are added stray notes of Mine Own, edited by Roby Datta, Cambridge: Galloway and Porter, Indian poet, writing in English, published in the United Kingdom
- John Davidson, Fleet Street, and Other Poems
- Lord Alfred Douglas, Sonnets
- Darrell Figgis, A Vision of Life, Irish poet published in the United Kingdom
- Thomas Hardy, Time's Laughingstocks, and Other Verses
- Frederic Manning, Scenes and Portraits, a historical novel set in the Renaissance
- George Meredith, Last Poems
- Alfred Noyes, The Enchanted Island, and Other Poems
- Ezra Pound, American poet published in the United Kingdom:
  - Personae
  - Exultations
- The Poets' Club publishes two anthologies: For Christmas MDCCCCVIII (January 1909) and The Book of the Poets' Club (December) including the first examples of Imagist poetry
- James Stephens, Insurrections, Irish poet published in the United Kingdom
- John Millington Synge, Poems and Translations, preface by W. B. Yeats, Irish poet published in the United Kingdom

=== United States ===
- Ambrose Bierce, Collected Works, including poetry, published in 12 volumes from this year to 1912
- Florence Earle Coates, Lyrics of Life
- Francis M. Finch, The Blue and the Gray and other verses, published posthumously (the author died in 1907), with an introduction by Andrew Dickson White, "and a portrait of the author"; New York: Henry Holt and Company
- Louise Imogen Guiney, Happy Ending
- James Oppenheim, Monday Morning
- Ezra Pound, American poet published in the United Kingdom:
  - Personae
  - Exultations
- Lizette Woodworth Reese, A Wayside Lute
- Robert Service, Ballads of a Cheechako
- George Sterling, A Wine of Wizardry
- William Carlos Williams, Poems

=== Other in English ===
- James Stephens, Insurrections, Irish poet published in the United Kingdom
- John Millington Synge, Poems and Translations, preface by W. B. Yeats, Irish poet published in the United Kingdom

== Works published in other languages ==
=== India ===
- Kerala Varma Valiya Koil Thampuran, ' 'Deiva Yogam' ', a short narrative poem, India, Malayalam-language

==== Telugu language ====
- Chellapilla Venkata Sastry and Divakarla Tirupati Sastry:
  - Panigrihita
  - Sravananandam
- Chilakamarti Lakshminarasimham, Gayopakhyanam, verse drama about the mythological Gaya, devotee of Lord Krishna
- Rayaprolu Subba Rao, Lalitha

=== Other ===
- Jean Cocteau, La Lampe d'Aladin, published when the author was 20 years old; France
- Ernst Enno, Uued luuletused, Estonia
- René Maran, La Maison du Bonheur, Guyanese poet writing in French
- Yone Noguchi, The Pilgrimage, Japan

== Births ==
Death years link to the corresponding "[year] in poetry" article:

- January 28 – Beatrice Deloitte Davis (died 1992), Australian book editor and poet
- February 6 – Seán Rafferty, born John Rafferty (died 1993), Scottish-born poet
- February 14 – A. M. Klein (died 1972) Ukrainian-born Canadian poet, essayist and author of short stories
- February 28 – Stephen Spender (died 1995), English poet, novelist and essayist who concentrated on themes of social injustice and the class struggle
- March 6 – Vagaland, pen name of Thomas Alexander Robertson (died 1973), Shetland Scottish poet
- March 9 – Elder Olson (died 1992), American poet, teacher and literary critic
- April 24 – Robert Farren (Roibeárd Ó Faracháin) (died 1984), Irish poet
- May 1 – Yannis Ritsos (died 1990), Greek poet
- May 9 – Robert Garioch (died 1981), Scots-language poet, translator, and key member in the literary revival of the language in the mid-20th century
- May 28 – Randall Swingler (died 1967), English poet, librettist, publisher and flautist
- May 30 – Edappally Raghavan Pillai (died 1936), Indian, Malayalam-language poet
- July 4 – Lynette Roberts (died 1995), Argentine-born Welsh poet
- July 18 – Bishnu Dey (died 1982), Bengali poet, prose writer and movie critic
- July 19 – Balamani Amma, Indian, Malayalam-language poet, a woman
- July 27 – Charles Brasch (died 1973), New Zealand poet, literary editor, arts patron and founding editor of the literary journal Landfall
- August 1 – W. R. Rodgers (died 1969), Irish poet, essayist, book reviewer, radio broadcaster, script writer, lecturer, teacher and Presbyterian minister
- September 10 – Irakli Abashidze (died 1992), Georgian poet, literary scholar and politician
- October 4 – P. Kunhiraman Nair (died 1978), Indian, Malayalam-language poet
- October 12 – Dorothy Livesay (died 1996), Canadian poet
- November 16 – Michio Mado, Japanese poet who worked for the Office of the Governor-General of Taiwan
- December 15 – John Glassco (died 1981) Canadian poet, memoirist, novelist and pornographer

== Deaths ==
- January 22 – Nabinchandra Sen (born 1847), Bengali poet and writer
- March 23 – John Davidson (born 1857), Scottish-born poet and playwright, suicide by drowning
- March 24 – John Millington Synge (born 1871), Irish playwright, poet, prose writer and collector of folklore, Hodgkin's-related cancer
- April 10 – Algernon Charles Swinburne (born 1837), English poet
- May 4 – Helen Marr Hurd (born 1839), American poet and teacher
- May 18 – George Meredith (born 1828), English novelist and poet
- June 24 – Sarah Orne Jewett (born 1849), American novelist, short story writer and poet
- July 26 – William Reed Huntington (born 1838), American Episcopal priest, author and poet
- August 21 – George Cabot Lodge (born 1873), American
- October 16 – Jakub Bart-Ćišinski (born 1856), Sorbian poet, writer, playwright and translator
- November 10 – George Essex Evans (born 1863), Australian
- November 18 – Renée Vivien (born 1877), English-born French-language Symbolist poet, lung congestion with complications
- November 19
  - Richard Watson Gilder (born 1844), American poet and editor
  - John B. Tabb (born 1845), American poet, Catholic priest and scholar
- November 28 – W. T. Goodge (born 1862), Australian
- November 30 – Romesh Chundar Dutt (born 1848), writer of Indian poetry in English; cousin of Toru Dutt

== Awards and honors ==
- Newdigate Prize (University of Oxford) – Frank Ashton-Gwatkin, "Michelangelo"

== See also ==
- 20th century in poetry
- 20th century in literature
- French literature of the 20th century
- List of years in literature
- List of years in poetry
- Silver Age of Russian Poetry
- Young Poland (Młoda Polska) a modernist period in Polish arts and literature, roughly from 1890 to 1918
