= 1893 in poetry =

This article covers 1893 in poetry. Nationality words link to articles with information on the nation's poetry or literature (for instance, Irish or France).

== Events ==
- June 14 – Opening of Shelley Memorial at University College, Oxford (from which the poet was expelled in 1811), designed by Basil Champneys with a reclining nude marble statue of Percy Bysshe Shelley by Edward Onslow Ford
- Founding of Vangiya Sahitya Parishad in Bengal

== Works published in English ==
=== Canada ===
- William Wilfred Campbell, The Dread Voyage Poems. Toronto: William Briggs.
- Bliss Carman, Low Tide at Grand Pré
- Mary Jane Katzmann, Frankincense and Myrrh: Selections from the poems of the late Mrs. William Lawson (M.J.K.L.). Harry Piers and Constance Fairbanks ed. Halifax.
- Thomas O'Hagan, In Dreamland and Other Poems
- Charles G. D. Roberts, Songs of the Common Day
- Duncan Campbell Scott, The Magic House and Other Poems
- James Elgin Wetherell, ed. Later Canadian Poems

=== Ireland ===
- Douglas Hyde, editor and translator from the Gaelic, The Love Songs of Connacht, Ireland
- W. B. Yeats, Irish poet published in the United Kingdom, The Celtic Twilight, poetry and nonfiction
- W. B. Yeats, Irish poet published in the United Kingdom and Edwin John Ellis, The Works of William Blake, Poetic, Symbolic, and Critical, Quaritch

=== United Kingdom ===
- Wilfred Scawen Blunt, published anonymously, Griselda
- Katherine Harris Bradley and Edith Emma Cooper, writing under the pen name "Michael Field", Underneath the Bough
- Robert Bridges, The Humours of the Court: a Comedy; and Other Poems
- Thomas Edward Brown, Old John, and Other Poems
- John Davidson, Fleet Street Eclogues, first series (see also Fleet Street Eclogues 1896)
- W. E. Henley, London Voluntaries; The Song of the Sword; and Other Verses
- George MacDonald, Poetical Works
- Alice Meynell, Poems
- Francis Thompson, Poems, including "The Hound of Heaven"
- W. B. Yeats, Irish poet published in the United Kingdom, The Celtic Twilight, poetry and nonfiction
- W. B. Yeats, Irish poet published in the United Kingdom, and Edwin John Ellis, editors, The Works of William Blake, Poetic, Symbolic, and Critical, Quaritch

=== United States ===
- Bliss Carman, Low Tide on Grand Pre, Canadian author published in the United States
- Paul Laurence Dunbar, Oak and Ivy
- Hamlin Garland, Prairie Songs
- Louise Imogen Guiney, A Roadside Harp
- Harriet Monroe, The Columbian Ode
- James Whitcomb Riley, Poems Here at Home

=== Other in English ===
- Henry Lawson, "Saint Peter", Australia
- Banjo Paterson, "The Geebung Polo Club", first published in The Antipodean, Australia

== Works published in other languages ==
- Carlo Favetti (died 1892), Rime e prose in vernacolo goriziano (Rhimes and Prose in the Vernacular of Gorizia), Friuli
- Francis Jammes, Vers, (also 1892 and 1894); France
- Maryana Marrash, Bint fikr, Ottoman Syria
- Guido Mazzoni, Voci della vita, Italy
- Saint-Pol-Roux, pen name of Paul Roux, Les Reposoirs de la procession, published starting this year and ending in 1907; France

== Births ==
Death years link to the corresponding "[year] in poetry" article:

- January 3 – W. N. Hodgson (Edward Melbourne) (killed in action 1916), English war poet
- January 10 – Vicente Huidobro (died 1948), Chilean Creacionismo poet and editor
- January 17 – Evelyn Scott (died 1963), American writer and poet
- January 18 – Jorge Guillén (died 1984), Spanish
- February 11 – Nan Shepherd (died 1981), Scottish novelist and poet
- February 26 – Ivor Richards (died 1979), English literary critic
- March 4 – Ewart Alan Mackintosh (killed in action 1917), English war poet of Scottish ancestry
- March 6 – Motokichi Takahashi 高橋元吉 (died 1965), Japanese, Taishō and Shōwa period poet (surname: Takahashi)
- March 18 – Wilfred Owen (killed in action 1918), English war poet
- March 26 – Richard Church (died 1972), English poet
- July 13 – Evan Morgan, 2nd Viscount Tredegar (died 1949), Welsh poet and occultist
- July 19 – Vladimir Mayakovsky (suicide 1930), Russian poet and playwright
- July 26 – George Grosz (died 1959), German artist and poet
- August 22 – Dorothy Parker (died 1967), American writer, poet and wit
- September 6 or 16 – Robert Nichols (died 1944), English war poet
- September 28 – Giannis Skarimpas (died 1984), Greek
- October 9 – Mário de Andrade (died 1945), Brazilian poet and academic
- October 14 – May Wedderburn Cannan (died 1973), English war poet
- October 26
  - Miloš Crnjanski, (died 1977) Serbian poet and novelist
  - Thomas MacGreevy (died 1967), Irish poet and director of the National Gallery of Ireland
- November 3 – Arthur Bourinot (died 1969), Canadian poet and lawyer
- December 4 – Herbert Read (born 1968), English anarchist poet and critic of literature and art
- December 6 – Sylvia Townsend Warner (died 1978), English novelist and poet
- December 30 – Gerald Bullett (died 1958), English writer and poet
- Also – Dharanidhar Sharma Koirala (died 1980), Indian, Nepali-language poet

== Deaths ==
Birth years link to the corresponding "[year] in poetry" article:

- January 23 – Phillips Brooks (born 1835), American Episcopal clergyman and hymnwriter
- January 15 – Fanny Kemble (born 1809), English author, poet, playwright and actress
- April 19 – John Addington Symonds (born 1840), English poet and literary critic
- August 5 – Sarah T. Bolton, née Barrett (born 1814), American poet
- December 5 – Matsudaira Katamori 松平容保 (born 1836), Japanese samurai and poet in the last days of the Edo period and the early to mid Meiji period (surname: Matsudaira)
- December 9 – Charles Sangster (born 1822), Canadian poet
- Also – Venmani Mahan Namboodiri (born 1844), Indian, Malayalam-language poet associated with the Venmani School of poetry

== See also ==
- 19th century in poetry
- 19th century in literature
- List of years in poetry
- List of years in literature
- Victorian literature
- French literature of the 19th century
- Symbolist poetry
- Young Poland (Młoda Polska) a modernist period in Polish arts and literature, roughly from 1890 to 1918
- Poetry
