= 1850 in poetry =

List of years in poetry	(table)
- … 1840; 1841; 1842; 1843; 1844; 1845; 1846; 1847; 1848; 1849; 1850; 1851; 1852; 1853; 1854; 1855; 1856; 1857; 1858; 1859; 1860 …
- In literature 1847 1848 1849 1850 1851 1852 1853
- Art; Archaeology; Architecture; Literature; Music; Philosophy; Science; +...

I hold it true, whate'er befall;

I feel it when I sorrow most;
'Tis better to have loved and lost
Than never to have loved at all.
* * *
Who trusted God was love indeed
And love Creation's final law
Tho' Nature, red in tooth and claw

With ravine, shriek'd against his creed

— From Cantos 27 and 56, In Memoriam A.H.H., by Alfred Tennyson, published this year

Nationality words link to articles with information on the nation's poetry or literature (for instance, Irish or France).

== Events ==
- May (late) – Alfred Tennyson's poem In Memoriam A.H.H., written to commemorate the death of his friend and fellow poet Arthur Hallam in 1833, is published by Edward Moxon in London; on June 1 the writer's anonymity is broken by The Publishers' Circular
- June 13 – Alfred Tennyson marries his childhood friend Emily Sellwood at Shiplake
- July – William Wordsworth's The Prelude; or, Growth of a Poet's Mind: An Autobiographical Poem, on which he has worked since 1798, is first published about 3 months after his death by Edward Moxon in London in 14 books, with the title supplied by the poet's widow, Mary; originally intended to form the introduction to The Recluse, for which The Excursion (1814) formed the second part; though The Prelude failed to arouse great interest at this time, it is later generally recognised as his masterpiece (second edition 1851; see also "Events" for 1798, 1799, 1806, 1820, The Recluse 1888)
- November – A new edition of Elizabeth Barrett Browning's Poems is published by Chapman & Hall in London, including (in vol. 2) her Sonnets from the Portuguese (written during her courtship by Robert Browning c.1845–46) of which the most famous will be no. 43 ("How do I love thee? Let me count the ways.") (Sonnets first printed separately in Boston 1866; see also Poems 1844, 1853, 1856)
- November 19 – Alfred Tennyson succeeds Wordsworth as Poet Laureate of the United Kingdom after Samuel Rogers turns down the post, saying he is too old for it and Tennyson is assured that birthday odes will not be required of him
- Golden Age of Russian Poetry, begun in about 1800 ends at about this time
- Young Germany (Junges Deutschland) a loose group of German writers from about 1830, stops flourishing at about this time

== Works published in English ==
How Do I Love Thee?

How do I love thee? Let me count the ways.
I love thee to the depth and breadth and height
My soul can reach, when feeling out of sight
For the ends of being and ideal grace.
I love thee to the level of every day's
Most quiet need, by sun and candle-light.
I love thee freely, as men strive for right.
I love thee purely, as they turn from praise.
I love thee with the passion put to use
In my old griefs, and with my childhood's faith.
I love thee with a love I seemed to lose
With my lost saints. I love thee with the breath,
Smiles, tears, of all my life; and, if God choose,
I shall but love thee better after death.

— Sonnet XLIII
from Sonnets From the Portuguese by Elizabeth Barrett Browning, written 1845, published this year

=== United Kingdom ===
- William Allingham, Poems
- Philip James Bailey, The Angel World, and Other Poems
- Thomas Lovell Beddoes, published anonymously, Death's Jest-Book; or, The Fool's Tragedy (posthumous)
- Elizabeth Barrett Browning, Poems including Sonnets from the Portuguese
- Robert Browning, Christmas-Eve and Easter-Day
- Sydney Dobell, writing under the pen name "Sydney Yendys", The Roman
- Elin Evans, writing under the pen name "Elen Egryn", Telyn Egryn ("Egryn's Harp", Welsh)
- Dora Greenwell, Stories That Might Be True, with Other Poems
- Leigh Hunt, The Autobiography of Leigh Hunt in three volumes
- Dante Gabriel Rossetti, The Blessed Damozel in The Gem
- John Ruskin, Poems
- Robert Southey, Southey's Common-place Book: Third/Fourth Series, poems and prose, edited by John Wood Warner (see also first and second series 1849)
- Alfred Tennyson:
  - In Memoriam A.H.H.
  - "Ring Out, Wild Bells"
- William Wordsworth, posthumously, The Prelude

=== United States ===
- Washington Allston, Lectures on Art and Poems, (scholarship)
- George Copway, The Ojibway Conquest (the author also published this year the nonfiction work, Traditional History of the Ojibway Nation)
- Richard Henry Dana Sr., Poems and Prose Writings, in two volumes, Volume 1 contains poems, both new and previously published in 1827, New York: Baker and Scribner
- Sylvester Judd, Philo, An Evangeliad
- Henry Wadsworth Longfellow, The Seaside and the Fireside
- Edgar Allan Poe, The Works of the Late Edgar Allan Poe: With a Memoir by Rufus Wilmot Griswold and Notices of His Life and Genius by N. P. Willis and J. R. Lowell, published in four volumes from this year to 1854 including "The Poetic Principle", an essay; criticism (published posthumously; died 1849)
- John Godfrey Saxe, Humorous and Satirical Poems
- William Gilmore Simms, The City of the Silent
- John Greenleaf Whittier:
  - Poems, Boston: Benjamin B. Mussey & Co.
  - Songs of Labor and Other Poems

== Works published in other languages ==
- James Huston, editor, Le répertoire national, anthology of French Canadian poetry in four volumes, published from 1848 to this year; including poetry by Joseph Mermet ("Les Boucheries: fêtes rurales du Canada"), Isidore Bédard ("Sol canadien, terre chérie"), François-Xavier Garneau, Napoléon Aubin, François-Magloire Derome and Pierre Chauveau
- Brian Mac Giolla Meidhre (d. 1805), Cúirt An Mheán Oíche, Irish
- Andreas Munch, Nye Digte, Norwegian
- Betty Paoli, Neve Gedichte ("New Poems"), Austrian

== Births ==
Death years link to the corresponding "[year] in poetry" article:

- January 15 – Mihai Eminescu (died 1889), Romanian
- February 20 – Nérée Beauchemin (died 1931), Canadian poet and physician
- June 27 – Ivan Vazov (died 1921), Bulgarian
- July 1 – Florence Van Leer Earle Coates (died 1927), American
- July 18 – Rose Hartwick Thorpe (died 1939), American
- September 2 – Eugene Field (died 1895), American
- November 5 – Ella Wheeler Wilcox (died 1919), American
- November 13 – Robert Louis Stevenson (died 1894), Scots novelist, poet, essayist and travel writer
- December 13 – William Chapman (died 1917), Canadian poet, journalist and bureaucrat
- December 25 – Isabella Valancy Crawford (died 1887), Irish-born Canadian poet
- Also:
  - Saul Adadi (died 1918), Libyan Sephardi Jewish hakham, rosh yeshiva and writer of piyyutim
  - Hortensia Antommarchi (died 1915), Colombian poet
  - Vitthal Bhagwani Lembhe (died 1920), Indian, Marathi-language poet
  - Savitagauri Pandya (died 1925), Indian, Gujarati-language woman poet
  - Vishvanatha Dev Varma, (died 1920), Indian, Sanskrit-language poet

== Deaths ==
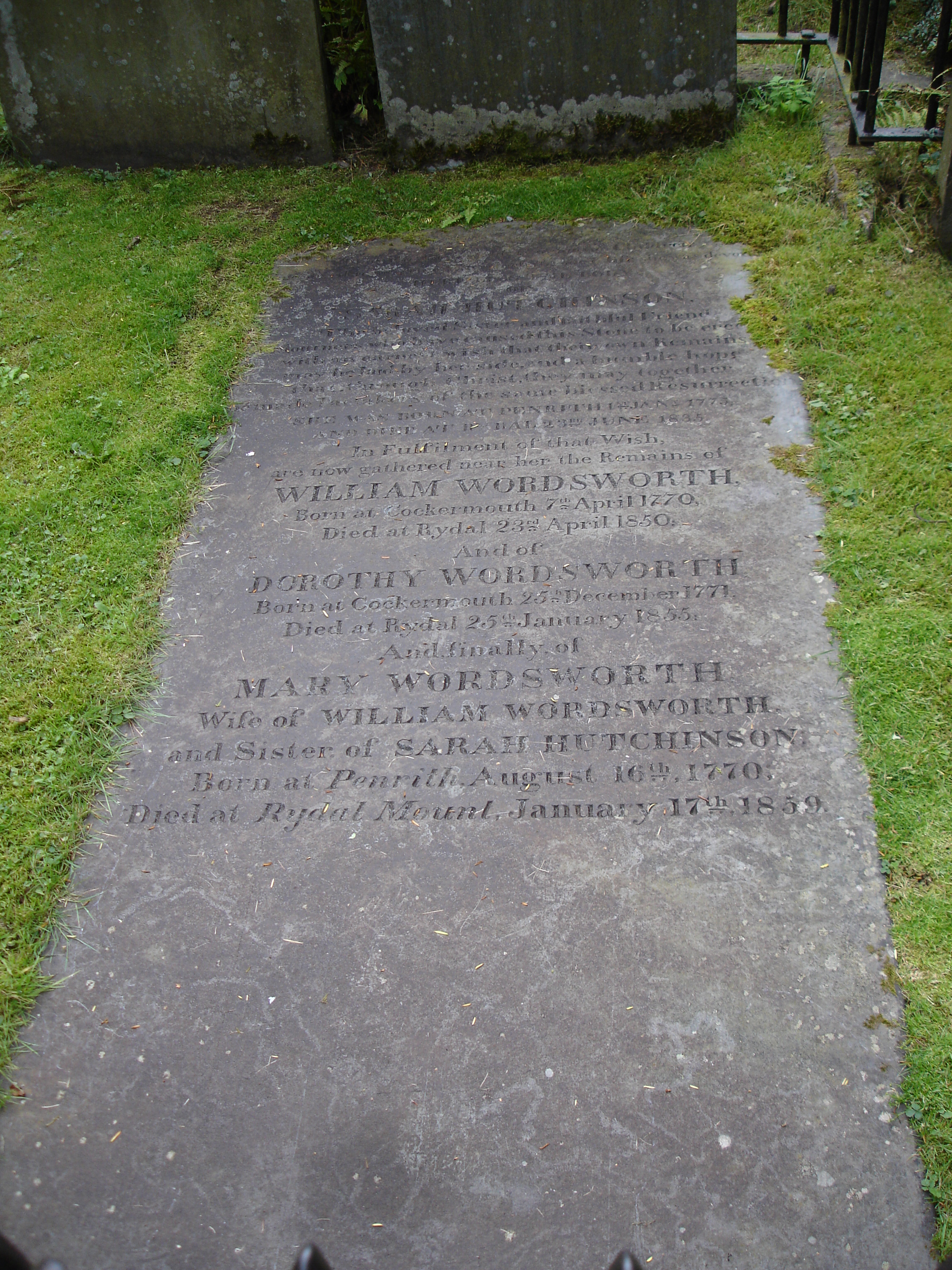
Gravestone of William Wordsworth, Grasmere, Cumbria

Birth years link to the corresponding "[year] in poetry" article:

- January 20 – Adam Oehlenschlager (born 1779), Danish
- January 20 – Philip Pendleton Cooke (born 1816), American lawyer and poet
- April 7 – William Lisle Bowles (born 1762), English
- April 23 – William Wordsworth (born 1770), English
- May 23 – Margaret Fuller (born 1810), American
- May 31 – Giuseppe Giusti (born 1809), Italian (Tuscan)
- August 22 – Nikolaus Lenau (born 1802), Austrian
- Also:
  - Manoah Bodman (born 1765), American

== See also ==
- 19th century in poetry
- 19th century in literature
- List of years in poetry
- List of years in literature
- Victorian literature
- French literature of the 19th century
- List of poets
- Poetry
- List of poetry awards
