= 1845 in poetry =

"Prophet!" said I, "thing of evil — prophet still, if bird or devil!

By that Heaven that bends above us — by that God we both adore —
Tell this soul with sorrow laden if, within the distant Aidenn,
It shall clasp a sainted maiden whom the angels name Lenore —
Clasp a rare and radiant maiden whom the angels name Lenore."

Quoth the Raven, "Nevermore."

— Edgar Allan Poe, The Raven

Nationality words link to articles with information on the nation's poetry or literature (for instance, Irish or France).

== Events ==
- January 10—Robert Browning, 32, and Elizabeth Barrett, 38, begin their correspondence when she receives a note declaring "I love you" from Browning, a little-known poet whose verses she had praised in her poem "Lady Geraldine's Courtship"; on May 20 they meet for the first time. She begins writing her Sonnets from the Portuguese.
- April - Nathaniel Hawthorne first publishes "P.'s Correspondence", a short story and example of alternative history in which many poets and other writers and political figures who have died in real life (such as John Keats, Percy Shelley and Lord Byron) are described as still living, and vice versa. The story, which appears in The United States Magazine and Democratic Review, is later included in Hawthorne's Mosses from an Old Manse (1846).

== Works published in English ==
=== United Kingdom ===
- W. E. Aytoun, writing under the pen name "Bon Gaultier", and Theodore Martin, The Book of Ballads, parodies
- Philip James Bailey, Festus (2nd, enlarged, edn, with authorship acknowledged)
- Bernard Barton, Household Verses
- Horatius Bonar, The Bible Hymn-Book
- Robert Browning, Dramatic Romances and Lyrics, (Volume 7 of Bells and Pomegranates) including "How They Brought the Good News from Ghent to Aix", "The Lost Leader", and "The Flight of the Duchess"; reprinted in Poems 1849; see also Bells and Pomegranates 1841, 1842, 1843, 1844, and 1846
- Thomas Cooper, The Purgatory of Suicides, written in Stafford Gaol
- Louisa Costello, editor, The Rose Garden of Persia, translations from Persian, anthology
- Frederick William Faber, The Rosary, and Other Poems
- George Gilfillan, A Gallery of Literary Portraits, first series, including biographical sketches of William Hazlitt, Percy Bysshe Shelley, Thomas Carlyle, Thomas De Quincey, Walter Savage Landor, Samuel Coleridge, William Wordsworth, Charles Lamb and Robert Southey; second series 1850, third series 1854
- Robert Southey, Oliver Newman: A New-England tale, unfinished, also includes other poems; published posthumously
- William Wordsworth, The Poems of William Wordsworth, Poet Laureate, has further revisions to poems and some published for the first time; see also Miscellaneous Poems 1820, Poetical Works 1827, Poetical Works 1857, and Poetical Works, Centenary Edition, 1870

=== United States ===
- Julia Abigail Fletcher Carney, "Little Things", first published in a Sunday school paper, Gospel Teacher (renamed, Myrtle)
- Thomas Holley Chivers, The Lost Pleiad, and Other Poems
- Rufus Wilmot Griswold, The Poets and Poetry of England, anthology
- Henry Beck Hirst, The Coming of the Mammoth
- George Moses Horton, The Poetical Works of George M. Horton, the Colored Bard of North Carolina, to which is Prefixed the Life of the Author, written by himself, published through a subscription; Horton, a slave, hoped to buy his freedom with earnings from his poetry, but was unsuccessful, and was finally freed in 1865 as a result of the Civil War, Hillsborough, North Carolina: Heart
- Henry Wadsworth Longfellow:
  - The Belfry of Bruges and Other Poems
  - Editor, The Waif, anthology
- William Wilberforce Lord, Poems
- James Russell Lowell, "The Present Crisis"
- Edgar Allan Poe, The Raven and Other Poems, including "The Raven", a poem first published January 29 in the New York Evening Mirror
- William Gilmore Simms, Grouped Thoughts and Scattered Fancies, sonnets; Richmond
- Nathaniel Parker Willis, Poems, Sacred, Passionate, and Humorous

== Works published in other languages ==
- Abraham Emanuel Fröhlich, Ulrich von Hutten, Switzerland
- François-Xavier Garneau, Histoire du Canada, Volume 1, covering the history of New France from its founding until 1701 (Volume 2 published in 1846, Volume 3 published in 1848; revised version in three volumes published in 1852), "a book which played a vital role in the emergence of a French Canadian literature, including poetry", according to The New Princeton Encyclopedia of Poetry and Poetics; Canada
- Théophile Gautier, Albertus, revised from the 1832 edition; poems in a wide variety of verse forms, often imitating other, more established Romantic poets such as Sainte-Beuve, Alphonse de Lamartine, and Victor Hugo (an expanded version of Poésies 1830, which contained 40 pieces composed when the author was 18 years old, and which went unsold during the upheaval of the July Revolution); includes "Albertus", written in 1831, a long narrative poem of 122 alexandrine stanzas parodying macabre and supernatural Romantic tales; France
- Heinrich Hoffmann (anonymously), Lustige Geschichten und drollige Bilder mit 15 schön kolorierten Tafeln für Kinder von 3–6 Jahren ("Funny Stories and Whimsical Pictures with 15 Beautifully Coloured Panels for Children Aged 3 to 6", later known as Struwwelpeter), German
- Christien Ostrowski, translator, Œuvres poétiques de Michiewicz ("Poetic Works of Mickiewicz"), translation into French from the original Polish of Adam Mickiewicz, Paris
- Sándor Petőfi, János Vitéz (John the Valiant) and Cipruslombok Etelke sírjára (Branches of Cypress for Etelke's Tomb), Hungary
- Zacharias Topelius, Ljungblommor ("Heather blossoms"), Volume I, Finland, Swedish language

== Births ==
Death years link to the corresponding "[year] in poetry" article:

- February 19 – Kerala Varma Valiya Koil Thampuran, also known as Kerala Varma, (died 1914), Indian, Malayalam-language poet and translator; also wrote in Malayalam, English and Sanskrit
- March 22 – John Banister Tabb (died 1909), American poet, Catholic priest and professor of English
- April 24 – Carl Spitteler (died 1924), Swiss
- April 30 – Alexander Anderson (died 1909), Scots
- May 13 – Emily Manning (died 1890), Australian
- May 14 – Louisa Sarah Bevington (died 1895), English poet and anarchist
- May 17 – Jacint Verdaguer (died 1902), Spanish poet writing in Catalan
- July 18 – Tristan Corbière (died 1875), French
- July 26 – Martina Swafford (died 1913), American poet.
- August 10 – Abai Qunanbaiuly (died 1904), Kazakh poet, composer, philosopher and cultural reformer
- October 14 – Olindo Guerrini (died 1916), Italian
- October 21 – Will Carleton (died 1912), American
- December 30 – Thomas Edward Spencer (died 1910), Australian

== Deaths ==
Birth years link to the corresponding "[year] in poetry" article:

- January 28 – Mary Ann Browne (born 1812), English poet and writer of musical scores
- February 22 – Sydney Smith (born 1771), English writer
- May 3 – Thomas Hood (born 1799), English poet
- May 12 – János Batsányi (born 1763), Hungarian poet
- May 26 – Jónas Hallgrímsson (born 1807), Icelandic poet
- June 17 – Richard Harris Barham ('Thomas Ingoldsby') (born 1788), English comic poet
- July 26 – John McPherson (born 1817), Canadian poet
- November 11 – Maria Gowen Brooks (born c. 1794), American poet
- Jahonotin Uvaysiy (born 1780), Uzbek Sufi poet

== See also ==
- 19th century in poetry
- 19th century in literature
- List of years in poetry
- List of years in literature
- Victorian literature
- French literature of the 19th century
- Biedermeier era of German literature
- Golden Age of Russian Poetry (1800–1850)
- Young Germany (Junges Deutschland) a loose group of German writers from about 1830 to 1850
- List of poets
- Poetry
- List of poetry awards
