= 1835 in poetry =

Nationality words link to articles with information on the nation's poetry or literature (for instance, Irish or France).

== Events ==
- November/December – The Federal Convention in Germany prohibits circulation of work by members of the "Young Germany" group of writers and the exiled poet Heinrich Heine.

== Works ==
=== United Kingdom ===
- Robert Browning, Paracelsus (reprinted in Poems 1849)
- John Clare, The Rural Muse
- William Cowper, The Works of William Cowper, edited by Robert Southey, 15 volumes published this year through 1837; posthumously published
- George Darley, Nepenthe
- Thomas De Quincey, two essays in the series Recollections of the Lake Poets, in Tait's Edinburgh Magazine on the Lake Poets, a fourth installment on Samuel Taylor Coleridge in January (first installments, which inaugurated the series, in September through November 1834; an essay on William Wordsworth in August (see also Recollections 1839, 1840)
- Leigh Hunt, Captain Sword and Captain Pen
- Letitia Elizabeth Landon, writing under the pen name "L.E.L.", The Vow of the Peacock and Other Poems
- Letitia Elizabeth Landon, writing under the pen name "L.E.L." Fisher's Drawing Room Scrap Book, 1836
- Thomas Moore, The Fudges in England (also see The Fudge Family in Paris 1818)
- William Wordsworth, Yarrow Revisited, and Other Poems

=== Other in English ===
- Joseph Rodman Drake, The Culprit Fay and Other Poems, posthumously published; the author, who died in 1820, had ordered his wife to destroy the manuscripts of what he called "trifles in rhyme" after his death, but she refused; contains the author's most popular pieces, including the title poem and "The American Flag"

== Works published in other languages ==
- Franz Grillparzer, Tristia ex Ponto, Austria
- Victor Hugo, Les Chants du crépuscule, France
- Elias Lönnrot, comp., Kalevala, "old" version, Finland
- Karl August Nicander, Hesperider, Sweden
- Frederik Paludan-Müller, Zuleimasflugt ("Zuleima's Flight"), Denmark

== Births ==
Death years link to the corresponding "[year] in poetry" article:

- January 4
  - Sir Alfred Comyn Lyall (died 1911), English poet in India
  - Lucy H. Washington (died 1913), American poet and social reformer
- March 1 – John James Platt (died 1917), American
- March 28 – Mary H. Gray Clarke (died 1892), American poet, author, correspondent
- April 17 – Augusta Cooper Bristol (died 1910), American
- April 26 – John Warren, 3rd Baron de Tabley (died 1895), English
- May 3 – Alfred Austin (died 1913), English poet laureate
- June 15 – Adah Isaacs Menken (died 1868), American actress, painter and poet
- June 17 – James Brunton Stephens (died 1902), Scottish-born Australian
- June 29 – Celia Thaxter (died 1894), American
- November 11 – Matthías Jochumsson (died 1920), Icelandic lyric poet, playwright, translator and pastor
- December 4 – Samuel Butler (died 1902), English novelist and poet
- December 13 – Phillips Brooks (died 1893), American hymnwriter
- Date not known:
  - Isidore Gordon Ascher (died 1914), Scottish-born Canadian
  - Ellen Johnston, "the factory girl" (died 1874), Scottish power loom weaver and poet

== Deaths ==
Birth years link to the corresponding "[year] in poetry" article:

- March 25 – Friederike Brun, Danish poet (born 1765)
- April 14 – Joseph Grant, Scottish poet (born 1805)
- May 16 – Felicia Dorothea Hemans, English poet (born 1793)
- November 1 – William Motherwell, Scottish poet (born 1797)
- November 21 – James Hogg, Scottish poet and novelist, "the Ettrick shepherd" (born 1770)
- December 25 – Antoine Ó Raifteirí, Irish poet, "last of the wandering bards" (born 1779)

== See also ==
- List of years in poetry
- List of years in literature
- 19th century in literature
- 19th century in poetry
- Golden Age of Russian Poetry (1800–1850)
- Young Germany (Junges Deutschland) a loose group of German writers from about 1830 to 1850
- List of poets
- Poetry
- List of poetry awards
