= Christmas-Eve and Easter-Day =

1850 poems by Robert Browning

Christmas-Eve and Easter-Day, a Poem (1850) is, despite the title, often treated as two poems by Robert Browning, rather than as one poem in two parts. It was the first new work published by Robert Browning after his marriage to Elizabeth Barrett Browning and their departure for Italy, and is widely considered to show the influence of his wife's religious beliefs. "Christmas-Eve" is an account of a vision in which the narrator is taken to a Nonconformist church, to St. Peter's in Rome, to a Göttingen lecture theatre where a practitioner of the Higher criticism is discoursing on the Christian myth, and back to the Nonconformist church. In "Easter-Day" a Christian and a sceptic debate the nature of faith. Christmas-Eve and Easter-Day gives valuable clues to the religious opinions of Browning himself, as opposed to those of his characters, but, as his wife warned a correspondent, "Certainly the poem does not represent his own permanent state of mind, which was what I meant when I told you it was dramatic."

Christmas-Eve and Easter-Day was first published by Chapman & Hall in 1850. In recent years it has been edited by Ian Jack, Rowena Fowler and Margaret Smith as part of The Poetical Works of Robert Browning, vol. 4 (Oxford: Clarendon Press, 1991), and by John Woolford, Daniel Karlin and Joseph Phelan as part of The Poems of Browning, vol. 3 (London: Longman, 1993).
