= 1911 in poetry =

Nationality words link to articles with information on the nation's poetry or literature (for instance, Irish or France).

== Events ==
- c. April 8 – English poet Lascelles Abercrombie and his family move to live near Dymock in rural Gloucestershire, first of the Dymock poets
- c. August – Wilhelm Apollinaris de Kostrowitzky, who writes under the pen name "Guillaume Apollinaire", is suspected in the theft of the Mona Lisa from The Louvre museum in Paris and imprisoned for six days
- December 16 – The Copyright Act in the United Kingdom consolidates copyright law in the British Empire and confirms the six libraries in each of which a copy of every book published in the U.K. must be deposited by the publisher: the British Museum Library (London); the Bodleian Library (Oxford); the Advocates Library (Edinburgh); the National Library of Wales (Aberystwyth); Trinity College Dublin; and Cambridge University Library

== Works published in English ==
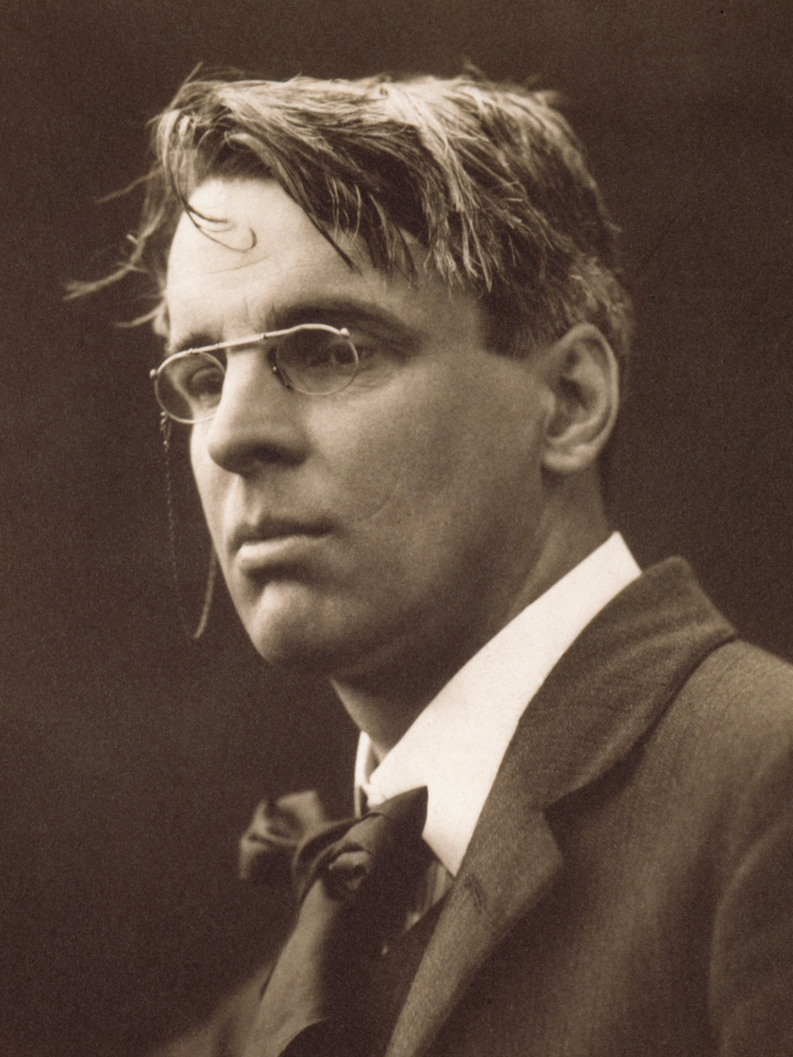
William Butler Yeats, photographed this year by George Charles Beresford

=== Australia ===
- Victor J. Daley, Wine and Roses
- Dorothea Mackellar, The Closed Door and Other Verses
- John Shaw Neilson, "Love's Coming"

=== Canada ===
- J. D. Logan, Songs of the Makers of Canada, and Other Homeland Lyrics
- Arthur Stringer, Irish Poems. New York: Mitchell Kennerley.

=== United Kingdom ===
- Rupert Brooke, Poems 1911
- G. K. Chesterton, The Ballad of the White Horse
- Elizabeth Daryush, Charitesse
- E. V. Knox, The Brazen Lyre
- Patrick MacGill, Songs of a Navvy
- John Masefield, The Everlasting Mercy
- Harold Monro, Before Dawn (poems and impressions)
- Stephen Phillips, The New Inferno
- Ezra Pound, Canzoni, London; American author published in the United Kingdom
- Katharine Tynan, New Poems
- Anna Wickham, Songs of John Oland

=== United States ===
- Franklin P. Adams, Tobogganing on Parnassus
- Ezra Pound, Canzoni, London; American author published in the United Kingdom
- George Sterling, The House of Orchids
- Sara Teasdale, Helen of Troy

=== Other in English ===
- J. N. Gupta, The Life and Works of Romesh Chunder Dutt, (Dutt (1848–1920) is an Indian poet writing in English), published in New York and London this year

== Works published in other languages ==
=== France ===
- Guillaume Apollinaire, pen name of Wilhelm Apollinaris de Kostrowitzky, Le Bestiaire ou Cortège d'Orphée, Paris: Deplanche; his first book of poetry (see also "Events" section, above)
- Paul Claudel:
  - L'Otage, France
  - Chemin de Croix
- Léon-Paul Fargue, Tancrède
- Francis Jammes, Les Géorgiques chrétiennes ("Christian Georgics"), three volumes, published from this year to 1912
- Oscar Vladislas de Lubicz-Milosz, also known as O. V. de L. Milosz, Les Éléments
- Saint-John Perse, Éloges, Paris: Editions de la Nouvelle Revue Française; France
- May Ziadeh, writing as Isis Copia, Fleurs de rêve, Lebanese-Palestinian poet writing in French

=== Indian subcontinent ===
Including all of the British colonies that later became India, Pakistan, Bangladesh, Sri Lanka and Nepal. Listed alphabetically by first name, regardless of surname:

- Devendranath Sen, Indian, Bengali-language poet:
  - Golap Guccha
  - Sisu Mangal
  - Apurba Naibedya
- Gurajada Appa Rao, Lavanaraju Kala, Telugu-language narrative poem written in a new, four-line stanzaic form (surname: Gurajada)
- S. G. Narasimhachar, Presita Priya Samagama translation from the original English of The Hermit by Oliver Goldsmith, Indian, Kannada language
- Tirupati Venkata Kavulu, Pandavodyoga Vijayam, Telugu-language verse drama based on the Mahabharatha tales (surname: Tirupathi)

=== Other languages ===
- Constantine P. Cavafy, Itaka and The Gods Abandon Antony, Greece
- José María Eguren, Simbólicas,, Peru
- Georg Heym, Der Krieg and Der ewige Tag, Germany
- Vicente Huidobro, Ecos del alma, Chile
- Else Lasker-Schüler, Meine Wunder, Germany

== Awards and honors ==
=== United States ===
- American Academy of Arts and Letters Gold Medal for Poetry: James Whitcomb Riley
- Nobel Prize for Literature: Count Maurice (Mooris) Polidore Marie Bernhard Maeterlinck, Belgian poet, playwright, and essayist

== Births ==
Death years link to the corresponding "[year] in poetry" article:

- January 1 – Audrey Wurdemann (died 1960), American poet, youngest winner of the Pulitzer Prize for Poetry
- January 7 – Faiz Ahmed Faiz (died 1984), Pakistani poet
- February 1 – Robert Gittings (died 1992), English writer, biographer, radio producer, playwright and poet
- February 8 – Elizabeth Bishop (died 1979), American poet, Pulitzer Prize winner
- February 13 – Faiz Ahmad Faiz (died 1984), Indian, Urdu-language poet, teacher, army officer, journalist, trade unionist and broadcaster
- February 16 – Hal Porter (died 1984), Australian writer, novelist, playwright and poet
- February 28 – Amir Hamzah (died 1946), Indonesian poet styled a national hero
- March 1 – Ian Mudie (died 1976), Australian
- April 7 – Hervé Bazin, full name: Jean-Pierre Hervé-Bazin (died 1966), French novelist and poet
- May 2 – Ben Belitt (died 2003), American poet
- May 13 – N. V. Krishna Warrier (died 1989), Indian, Malayalam-language poet, critic and scholar who introduces new types of long narrative poems and satires; editor of weekly Mathrubhumi; director of Kerala Bhasa Institute
- May 29 – Leah Goldberg (died 1970), Israeli poet writing in Hebrew
- June 11 – Josephine Miles (died 1985), American poet and literary critic
- June 17 – Allen Curnow (died 2001), New Zealand poet
- June 20 – Sufia Kamal (died 1999), Bengali poet, writer, organizer, feminist and activist
- June 28 – Clem Christesen (died 2003), Australian poet, founding editor of Meanjin
- June 30 – Czesław Miłosz (died 2004), Polish poet, prose writer and translator.
- July 12 – Umashankar Joshi (died 1988), Indian, Gujarati-language novelist, poet, critic, short-story writer, playwright, travel writer and academic
- July 19 – Mervyn Peake (died 1968), writer, artist, illustrator and poet
- August 25 – J. V. Cunningham (died 1985), American poet, literary critic and teacher
- September 3 – Ernst Meister (died 1979), German
- September 9
  - Paul Goodman (died 1972), American poet
  - Ale Ahmad Suroor (died 2002), Indian Urdu-language poet
- October 11 – Changampuzha Krishna Pillai (died 1948), Indian, Malayalam-language poet and translator
- October 13 – Millosh Gjergj Nikolla ('Migjeni') (died 1938), Albanian poet and writer
- October 26 – Sorley Maclean (died 1996), Scottish poet
- October 28 – Patrice de La Tour du Pin (died 1975), French
- November 2 – Odysseus Elytis (died 1996), Greek
- November 5 – Vailoppilli Sreedhara Menon (died 1985), Indian, Malayalam-language poet
- November 23 – William Hart-Smith (died 1990), Australian
- December 13 – Kenneth Patchen (died 1972) American poet and novelist
- Also:
  - Robert Clark (died 2004), Indian-born Australian
  - Sreedhara Menon, Vailoppillil (died 1985), Indian, Malayalam-language poet
  - Samsher Bahadur Singh (died 1993), Indian, Hindi-language poet, essayist and artist
  - Tenneti Suri (died in 1959), Indian, Telugu-language poet, novelist, translator and journalist

== Deaths ==
Birth years link to the corresponding "[year] in poetry" article:

- January 15 – Carolina Coronado (born 1820), Spanish Romantic poet, member of Hermandad Lírica
- February 22 – Frances Harper (born 1825), African-American abolitionist, poet and author
- April 11 – Sir Alfred Comyn Lyall (born 1835), English civil servant, literary historian and poet
- May 29 – W. S. Gilbert (born 1836), English comic poet and librettist
- July 16 – Amelia Denis de Icaza (born 1836), Panamanian romantic poet in Nicaragua
- August 7 – Elizabeth Akers Allen (born 1832), American author, journalist and poet
- December 29 – Rosamund Marriott Watson, writing as Graham R. Tomson (born 1860), English poet
- Also:
  - Jwala Prasad Barq (born 1863), Indian, Urdu-languagepoet and translator
  - Eknath Ganesh Bhandare (born 1863), Indian, Marathi-language poet, translator and station-master
  - Abdul Ahad Nadim (born 1840), Indian, Urdu-language poet, writer of "nats" (devotional lyrics addressed to the Prophet) in the traditional variety of the Kashmiri '"Vatsun"

== See also ==
- Poetry
- List of years in poetry
- Silver Age of Russian Poetry
- Acmeist poetry movement in Russian poetry
- Dymock poets
- Ego-Futurism movement in Russian poetry
- Expressionism movement in German poetry
- Young Poland (Polish: Młoda Polska) modernist period in Polish arts and literature
