= 1907 in poetry =

Nationality words link to articles with information on the nation's poetry or literature (for instance, Irish or France).

== Events ==
- April – The New York Times and The Washington Post print a lengthy interview with the new British ambassador, James Bryce, in which he remarks that the United States lacks great poets.
- August – George Sterling's fantasy-horror poem "A Wine of Wizardry" is published in the September-dated Cosmopolitan magazine with an afterword by Ambrose Bierce, setting off a months-long nationwide controversy and making Sterling notorious.
- Hélène van Zuylen leaves her partner, English-born French poet Renée Vivien, for another woman.

== Works published in English ==
=== Canada ===
- Arthur Wentworth Hamilton Eaton, The Lotus of the Nile and Other Poems
- Peter McArthur, The Prodigal and other Poems
- Robert W. Service, Songs of a Sourdough (published in the United States as The Spell of the Yukon and Other Verses), including "The Shooting of Dan McGrew" and "The Cremation of Sam McGee", Scottish-born poet resident in Canada
- Arthur Stringer, The Woman in the Rain, and Other Poems
- Agnes Ethelwyn Wetherald, The Last Robin: Lyrics and Sonnets

=== United Kingdom ===
- Gordon Bottomley, Chambers of Imagery
- Joseph Campbell, The Gilly of Christ
- Ethel Carnie, Rhymes from the Factory
- Padraic Colum, Wild Earth
- John Davidson, God and Mammon
- W. H. Davies, New Poems
- Ernest Dowson (died 1900), Cynara: a Little Book of Verse
- James Elroy Flecker, The Bridge of Fire
- Ford Madox Ford:
  - An English Girl
  - From Inland, and Other Poems
- James Joyce, Chamber Music, Irish writer resident in continental Europe, published in England
- Terence MacSwiney (as Cuireadóir), The Music of Freedom, Irish poet
- Alfred Noyes, The Hill of Dreams
- Dora Sigerson, Collected Poems

=== United States ===
- Witter Bynner, An Ode to Harvard and Other Poems
- Lizelia Augusta Jenkins Moorer, Prejudice Unveiled
- Sara Teasdale, Sonnets to Duse and Other Poems
- George Sterling, "A Wine of Wizardry"

== Works published in other languages ==
=== France ===
- Paul Claudel:
  - Art poétique
  - Connaissance de l'Est ("Knowledge of the East"), expanded from the original 1900 edition
  - Partage de midi
  - Processionnal pour saluer le siècle nouveau ("Processional for the New Century")
- Saint-Pol-Roux, pen name of Paul Roux, Les Reposoirs de la procession, published starting in 1893 and ending this year
- Renée Vivien, pen name of Pauline Tarn, Flambeaux éteints ("Extinguished Torches")

=== Other languages ===
- Delmira Agustini, El libro blanco, Uruguay
- Stefan George, Der siebente Ring ("The Seventh Ring"); German
- Peider Lansel, Primulas, Romansh language, Switzerland
- Antonio Machado, Soledades, galerías, y otros poemas ("Solitudes, Galleries, and Other Poems"); Spain
- Gregorio Martínez Sierra, La casa de primavera ("The House of Spring"), Spain
- Rainer Maria Rilke, New Poems (Neue Gedichte), German

== Births ==
Death years link to the corresponding "[year] in poetry" article:

- January 24 – Francis Brabazon (died 1984), Australian
- January 30 – Jun Takami 高見順 pen-name of Takama Yoshioa (died 1965), Japanese Shōwa period novelist and poet
- February 1 – Günter Eich (died 1972), German poet, dramatist and author
- February 21 – W. H. Auden (died 1973), English-born United States
- March 17 – Parvin E'tesami (died 1941), Persian
- March 18 – Luis Gabriel Portillo (died 1993), Spanish Republican professor and poet
- April 29 – Chūya Nakahara 中原 中也 (died 1937), Japanese early Shōwa period poet
- April 30 – Jacob Hiegentlich (suicide 1940), gay Dutch Jewish writer, also writing poetry in German
- May 4 – Lincoln Kirstein (died 1996), American cultural figure
- June 2 – John Lehmann (died 1987), English poet, writer and editor
- June 7 – Mascha Kaléko (died 1975), German-language poet
- July 21 – Alec Derwent Hope (died 2000), Australian
- August 16 – Edward James (died 1984), English poet and patron of the arts and of surrealism
- September 12 – Louis MacNeice (died 1963), Irish-born
- September 15 – Gunnar Ekelöf (died 1968), Sweden
- October 21 – Nikos Engonopoulos (died 1985), Greek
- October 28 – John Hewitt (died 1987), Irish
- December 14 – R. N. Currey (died 2001), South African-born English
- December 20 – John Joseph Thompson (died 1968), Australian
- Also:
  - Susan McGowan (died 2003), Australian
  - Vaughan Morgan (died 1987), New Zealand

== Deaths ==
- March 19 – Thomas Bailey Aldrich (born 1836), United States
- April 6 – William Henry Drummond (born 1854), Canada
- April 23 – André Theuriet (born 1833), French poet and novelist
- July 7 – Annie Louisa Walker (born 1836), English and Canadian novelist and poet
- July 15 – Qiu Jin (born 1875), Chinese revolutionary, feminist and poet, executed
- July 31 – Francis Miles Finch (born 1827), United States lawyer and poet
- August 25 – Mary Elizabeth Coleridge, (born 1861), English novelist, poet and teacher who wrote poetry under the pseudonym Anodos (taken from George MacDonald); great-grandniece of Samuel Taylor Coleridge and great niece of Sara Coleridge
- September 6 – Sully Prudhomme (born 1839), French poet and essayist; 1st Nobel Prize winner
- September 8 – Iosif Vulcan (born 1841), Romanian magazine editor, poet, playwright, novelist and cultural figure
- November 13 – Francis Thompson (born 1859), English
- November 28 – Stanisław Wyspiański (born 1869), Polish dramatist, poet and painter
- Also – John Arthur Phillips (born 1842), Canadian

== Awards and honors ==
- Nobel Prize for Literature: Rudyard Kipling

== See also ==
- 20th century in poetry
- 20th century in literature
- List of years in poetry
- List of years in literature
- French literature of the 20th century
- Silver Age of Russian Poetry
- Young Poland (Młoda Polska) a modernist period in Polish arts and literature, roughly from 1890 to 1918
- Poetry
