= Recollections of the Lake Poets =

Recollections of the Lake Poets is a collection of biographical essays written by the English author Thomas De Quincey. In these essays, originally published in Tait's Edinburgh Magazine between 1834 and 1840, De Quincey provided some of the earliest, best informed and most candid accounts of the three Lake Poets, William Wordsworth, Samuel Taylor Coleridge and Robert Southey, and others in their circle.

== Candour ==
De Quincey wrote from personal familiarity, having known all three men during the first two decades of the nineteenth century. When he wrote about them twenty years later De Quincey ignored the constraints and repressions typical of biography in his era, and produced realistic and nuanced portraits. De Quincey was the first person to address the problem of plagiarism in Coleridge's works, a problem that was ignored or neglected until modern scholars began addressing it.

== Responses ==
The degree of candour that De Quincey brought to his portraits of people who were then still living or recently dead was extremely rare, if not unprecedented, in contemporaneous literature and journalism, and it provoked strong negative reactions. In the mid-1830s, when the essays were first being published, Southey called De Quincey "a calumniator, cowardly spy, traitor, base betrayer of the hospitable social hearth," and "one of the greatest scoundrels living!" Some other interested parties, however, responded more calmly. Coleridge's daughter Sara, for instance, found De Quincey's treatment of her father insightful and generally fair.

== The essays ==
De Quincey wrote about the figures of the "Lake School," especially Wordsworth and Coleridge, repeatedly. The essays that make up the collection are primarily the following (each year links to its corresponding "[year] in poetry" article):

- "Samuel Taylor Coleridge," Tait's Magazine, September through November 1834 and January 1835
- "A Letter to William Wordsworth," August 1835
- "William Wordsworth," January, February, and April 1839
- "William Wordsworth and Robert Southey," July 1839
- "Southey, Wordsworth, and Coleridge," August 1839
- "Recollections of Grasmere," September 1839
- "The Saracen's Head," December 1839
- "Westmoreland and the Dalesmen," January 1840
- "Society of the Lakes, I, II, and III," January, March, and June 1840

== Editions ==
After their initial publication several of the essays appeared in the second volume of Selections Grave and Gay (1854), the first British collected edition of De Quincey's works. For that edition he edited his essays, trimming some passages but adding others. The essays were reprinted again in a separate volume, as Recollections of the Lakes and the Lake Poets (1862); that title may or may not have originated with De Quincey. There were three editions of the essays in the twentieth century. Edward Sackville-West's Recollections of the Lake Poets (1948) and John E. Jordan's Reminiscences of the English Lake Poets (1961) both relied primarily upon the revised texts of 1854, but for his edition, published in 1970, David Wright returned to the original texts and to the title of the collection issued in 1862.

== See also ==
- Romantic poetry
