= Lucy Barton =

American academic (1891–1979)

- Born: 1891
- Died: 1979 (aged 87–88)

Lucy Barton (1891 - 1979) was an American academic.

Born in Ogden, Utah, Barton received her bachelor's degree from the Carnegie Institute of Technology in 1917; in 1943 she received her master's degree at New York University. Four years later she took a position as a theater instructor at the University of Texas at Austin; she would go on to become the head of the drama department at the University of Alabama. She completed a textbook, Historic Costume for the Stage, that was published in 1935. It was followed in 1945 by another book, Period Patters, that acted as a complement to the first. The former volume has become a standard reference work in the field.
