= Motokichi Takahashi =

Japanese poet

Motokichi Takahashi (高橋 元吉, Takahashi Motokichi; 6 March 1893 – 28 January 1965), was a poet during the Taishō and Shōwa periods of Japan. He was born in Maebashi city Gunma Prefecture.
