= Henry Beck Hirst =

American poet (1813–1874)

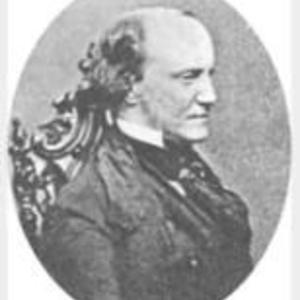
- Born: August 23, 1813; Philadelphia, Pennsylvania
- Died: March 30, 1874 (aged 60); Philadelphia, Pennsylvania
- Occupation: Poet

Henry Beck Hirst (August 23, 1813 – March 30, 1874) was an American poet.

== Biography ==
Hirst was born in Philadelphia. He studied law, but was not admitted to the bar until 1843, his studies having been interrupted by business pursuits.

Hirst's first poems were published in Graham's Magazine. He afterward wrote The Coming of the Mammoth, and other Poems (Boston, 1845), Endymion, a Tale of Greece (1848), and The Penance of Roland (1849).

Hirst also wrote a nonfiction work: The Book of Cage Birds (1843).

He died in 1874 and was interred at Laurel Hill Cemetery in Philadelphia.
