= 1852 in poetry =

This article covers 1852 in poetry. Nationality words link to articles with information on the nation's poetry or literature (for instance, Irish or France).

== Works published in English ==
=== United Kingdom ===
- Matthew Arnold, Empedocles on Etna, and Other Poems
- Alfred Tennyson, Ode on the Death of the Duke of Wellington

=== United States ===
- Thomas Holley Chivers, The Death of the Devil, A Serio-Ludicro, Tragico-Comico, Nigero-Whiteman Extravaganza
- Oliver Wendell Holmes Sr., The Poetical Works of Oliver Wendell Holmes
- Richard Realf, Guesses at the Beautiful
- Richard Henry Stoddard, Poems

== Works published in other languages ==
=== France ===
- Théophile Gautier's Emaux et camées
- Leconte de Lisle, Poèmes antiques
- Gérard de Nerval, et Les illuminés

=== Other ===
- Andreas Munch, Sorg og Trøst, Norwegian
- Theodor Storm, Gedichte ("Poems"), Germany

== Births ==
Death years link to the corresponding "[year] in poetry" article:

- February 24 – George Moore (died 1933) Irish novelist, short-story writer, poet, art critic, memoirist and dramatist
- March 15 – Lady Gregory (died 1932), Irish dramatist, folklorist and poet
- March 22 – Francis William Bourdillon (died 1921), English poet and translator
- April 23 – Edwin Markham (died 1940), American poet
- June 17 – M. A. Bayfield (died 1922), English classical scholar and writer on poetry
- October 31 – Mary E. Wilkins Freeman (died 1930), American novelist and poet
- November 10 – Henry van Dyke (died 1933), American author, poet, educator and clergyman
- Also:
  - Ganesh Janardan Agasha (died 1919), Indian, Marathi-language poet and literary critic
  - Emma Maria Caillard
  - Moyinkutty Vaidyar (died 1891), Indian, Malayalam-language poet

== Deaths ==
Birth years link to the corresponding "[year] in poetry" article:

- February 17 – Micah Joseph Lebensohn (born 1828), Lithuanian Jewish, Hebrew language poet (tuberculosis)
- February 25 – Thomas Moore (born 1779), Irish-born poet and songwriter
- April 10 – John Howard Payne (born 1791), American actor, playwright, author and consul in Tunis (1842–1852); most remembered as creator of "Home! Sweet Home!"
- April 25 – Álvares de Azevedo (born 1831), Brazilian Ultra-Romantic poet and writer (tuberculosis)
- May 3 – Sara Coleridge (born 1802), English writer
- November 15 – John Hamilton Reynolds (born 1794), English poet, satirist, critic and playwright

== See also ==
- 19th century in poetry
- 19th century in literature
- List of years in poetry
- List of years in literature
- Victorian literature
- French literature of the 19th century
- Poetry
