= Lake Poets =

Group of distinguished geographical poets

The Lake Poets is a term used for a group of English poets who all lived in the Lake District of North West England, in the first half of the nineteenth century. As a group, they followed no single "school" of thought or literary practice then known. They were named, only to be uniformly disparaged, by the Edinburgh Review. They are considered part of the English Romantic movement.

The three main figures of what has become known as the Lakes School were William Wordsworth, Samuel Taylor Coleridge, and Robert Southey. They were associated with several other poets and writers, including Dorothy Wordsworth, Charles Lamb, Mary Lamb, Charles Lloyd, Hartley Coleridge, John Wilson, and Thomas De Quincey.

== Origins and accuracy of the name ==
The "Lake Poet School" (or 'Bards of the Lake', or the 'Lake School') was initially a derogatory term ("the School of whining and hypochondriacal poets that haunt the Lakes", according to Francis Jeffrey as reported by Coleridge) that was also a misnomer, as it was neither particularly born out of the Lake District, nor was it a cohesive school of poetry. The principal members of the 'group' were William Wordsworth, Samuel Taylor Coleridge and Robert Southey. Dorothy Wordsworth was an auxiliary member who was unpublished during her lifetime (her journals, letters, and poems were published posthumously), but she provided much of the inspiration for her brother William's work.

There was a certain amount of additional irony involved in the 'School's' perception by readers, who were inspired, upon reading the poetry, to visit the area, thus helping to destroy, in the mind of Wordsworth at least, the very thing that made the Lakes special (although he himself ended up writing one of the best guides to the region). In addition, many of the first and second generation practitioners of Romantic poetry had a complex and not entirely easy relationship with the Lakes (apart from Wordsworth). "For the most part other Romantic poets either struggle with a Lake Poet identity or come to define themselves against what the Lakes seem to offer in poetic terms."

== The Lake poets ==
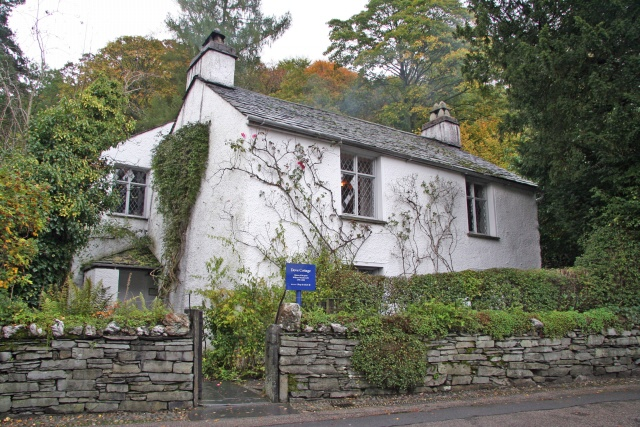
Dove Cottage (Town End, Grasmere) – home of William and Dorothy Wordsworth, 1799–1808; home of Thomas De Quincey, 1809–1820

For Wordsworth, who settled at Dove Cottage, Grasmere, with his sister Dorothy after some years of wandering, the Lakes became bound up with his identity as a poet. Born and brought up on the fringes of the Lake District (at Cockermouth and Penrith), Wordsworth came back to the area in December 1799 and settled into a 'poetic retirement' within his 'native mountains.' Although Wordsworth did not 'discover' the Lake District, nor was he the one who popularised it the most, he "was destined to become one of the key attractions to the area, while his particular vision of his native landscape would have an enduring influence upon its future". Not just a 'nature poet', his poetry "is about the organic relationship between human beings and the natural world...' After a brief flirtation with the Picturesque in his Cambridge years, he came to see this aesthetic view of nature as being only one of many (although it is arguable that he "was under the sway of Picturesque theory", he frequently transcended it). His 'vision' of nature was one that did not distort it in order to make art.

Wordsworth's early radical political ideas led him to his second poetic characteristic: the use of "plain language" and having for his subject the "common man" as represented by the Dales-folk (rather than "kings and queens, lords and ladies or gods and goddesses" as was the case up to then). A third notable feature of his work was to do with the inward-turning of his mind, producing a semi-autobiographical take on nature and imagination: his poem The Prelude, he wrote to Dorothy, was "the poem on the growth of my own mind."

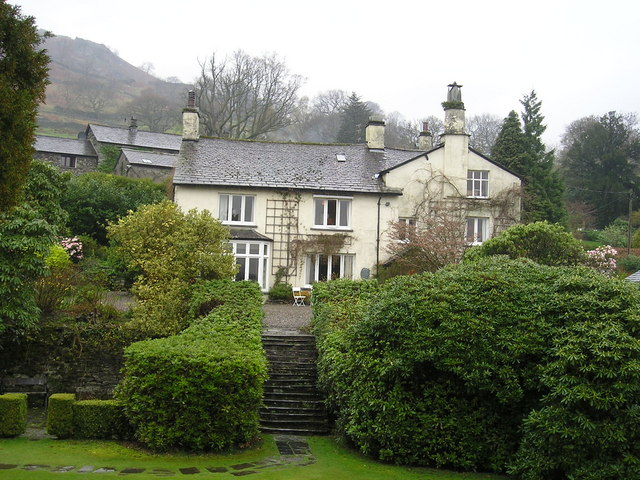
Rydal Mount, home to Wordsworth 1813–1850. Hundreds of visitors came here to see him over the years

Despite this reclusive side of his personality, Wordsworth was a strong believer in family and community, and he was much concerned with the effects on (especially poor) people's way of life of social change (for example, due to the enclosure movement) that were taking place. He disliked change that flew in the face of Nature: the planting of regimented lines of Larches; the coming of the railways; new building that did not chime with the vernacular; and the building of grand houses in the Lakes by the industrialists of Lancashire particularly upset him. In 1810 he published his Guide to the Lakes, tellingly subtitled "for the Use of Tourists and Residents", and with a Section Three entitled "Changes, and Rules of Taste for Preventing their Bad Effects." Nicholson argues that the Guide was the outcome of the loss of Wordsworth's poetic vision of nature and a turning outwards into hard facts in order to preserve his sanity after "years, perhaps, of disillusion, disappointment, of spiritual impotence..." Another aspect of it was the link to the ideas of Uvedale Price, whom Wordsworth knew and who proposed a "conservative, historicising and non-interventionist aesthetic". The Guide ran to five editions during Wordsworth's lifetime and proved to be very popular. Indeed, it has been said that "the architectural axioms of building and gardening in the Lake District for the next hundred years were established by the Guide".

For other writers, the region's pull was more uncertain. Coleridge followed Wordsworth to the Lakes and moved into Greta Hall in 1800. Although identified by his contemporaries as a 'Lake Poet', Coleridge's response to the landscape was at variance with the vision of Wordsworth, leading Coleridge to identify the landscape's "Gothic elements"..."and in so doing seems to recognise a potential for psychological horror rather than solace." Wordsworth's rejection of the poem Christabel, partly written at Greta Hall, for the Lyrical Ballads collection, added to Coleridge's depression over his personal life, his doubts about being able to write as he would have wished and his ill-health which was made worse by the Cumbrian climate. This led him to resort to the Kendal Black Drop, making matters desperate. Coleridge moved out of the area in 1804.

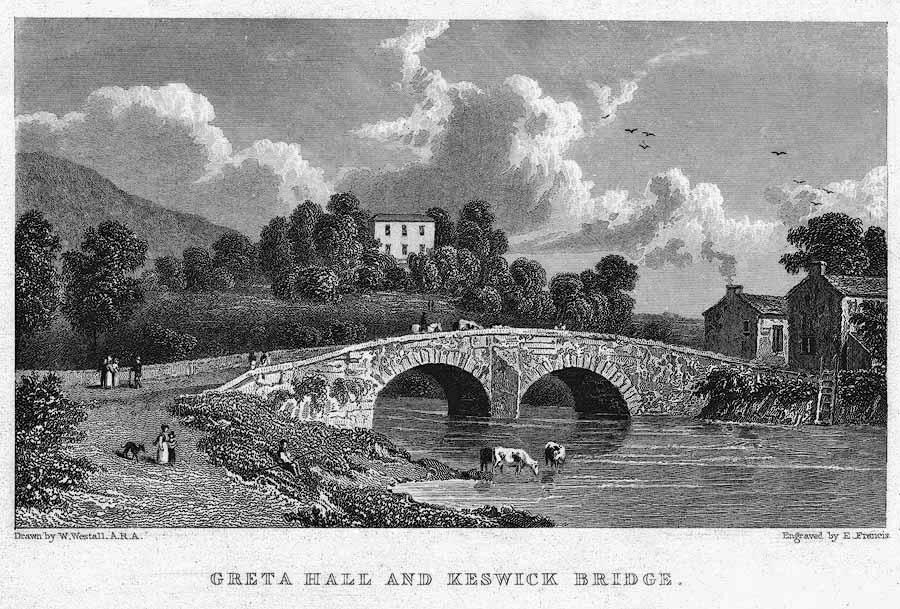
Greta Hall, Keswick – home of Samuel Taylor Coleridge, 1800–1804; home to Robert Southey, 1803–1843

Robert Southey, it has been argued, although becoming identified as the central 'Lake Poet' (he lived at Greta Hall from 1803 to 1843), was mostly a prose writer and did not particularly subscribe to the Wordsworthian vision of the Lakes. Southey, like Wordsworth, started out on the republican left, but, by the time the threat from Napoleon had dwindled, he had become the embodiment of a Tory extolling the virtues of nation and patriotism, and using the Lakes as a touchstone, and as "the symbol of the nation's covenant with God."

Letitia Elizabeth Landon's sketch, Grasmere Lake, A Sketch by a Cockney., in Fisher's Drawing Room Scrap Book, 1834, is a spoof on the Lake Poets, whom she admired (especially Wordsworth) but regarded as outmoded. In her view the days of Romanticism were over.

In John Paterson's Mare, James Hogg's allegorical satire on the Edinburgh publishing scene first published in the Newcastle Magazine in 1825, the Lake Poets feature as 'a whole covey of sandpipers or water larks'.

== Associated writers ==
The second generation of Romantic poets were drawn to the area by the Romantic vision of seclusion and by the perceived republican views of the older poets, but found a different reality when they arrived. Shelley lived for three months in 1811 at Keswick, having been drawn to the Lakes by reading the early, "liberty and equality" Southey, only to find that Southey's views had changed and that the Lakes had been despoiled by "the manufacturers".

Keats, in the summer of 1818, had a similar response to that of Shelley, finding his hero Wordsworth's house full of fashionable people and Wordsworth himself away canvassing for the local Tory candidate. Keats moved on to Scotland which provided him with the inspiration he sought (and where, in particular, he felt the influence of Robert Burns).

Byron did not visit the Lakes, but he ridiculed the isolation and narrowness of mind of the older Lake Poets, as well as of their abandonment of radical politics.

The hale and hearty John Wilson provided an alternative take on the role of Lake Poet. He lived near Windermere between 1808 and 1815 and knew the older Lake Poet trio well. His poetry (Isle of Palms) reveals a physical response to the Lakes scenery (he was an energetic walker and climber), and emphasises companionship and energy as against Wordsworthian quiet and solitude.

Wilson knew both Harriet Martineau and Thomas De Quincey. Martineau settled in a house she had built near Ambleside in 1845. As befitted her sociology-based background, her views concentrated on the need for the Lakes to be connected more with the outside world (for example, she was in favour of improved sanitation and of the new railways being set up through the district, unlike her friend Wordsworth). Her guide to the Lakes (Complete guide to the Lakes, 1855) was a rather factual and clear-eyed description about what to find there and about the condition of the people.

De Quincey moved into Dove Cottage in 1809 after having met his hero Wordsworth a couple of times before at Allan Bank, where the Wordsworths lived during 1808–1811, and then at Rydal Mount (Recollections of the Lake Poets, edited essays, 1834–1840). His worship of Wordsworth turned sour after De Quincey married a local girl and the Wordsworths refused to meet her. Instead, according to Nicholson, he turned more to the local dalesfolk and "he got to know the dalesmen as people, as persons, better than ever Wordsworth did". He reversed the practice of the Picturesque – instead of using the imagination to transform (and distort) the real, external world, he used the external world of the Lakes to feed his dreams and imagination.

== Other writers ==
The beauty of the Lake District has also inspired many other writers over the years, beyond the core Lake Poets. These include their contemporaries Bryan Procter, Felicia Hemans, and Walter Scott, as well as the labouring-class and slightly later John Close, who catered particularly to the growing tourist trade. Other poets include James Payn, Margaret Cropper, and Norman Nicholson.

In 1871, aged 48, having visited the Lakes many times, John Ruskin decided to settle down in Brantwood, a house overlooking Coniston Water. Worn out in body and mind, he was looking for a restful escape, and it was this 'weariness and despair' that caught the sympathy of the Lake visitors. They, too, turned to the Lakes for comfort and rest,' rather than for the 'stimulus and excitement that had been the joy of the early travellers.' Ruskin, although he wrote little about the area, ended up taking on the mantle of Wordsworth as the 'new Sage of the Lakes, the Picturesque Figure, the Old Man of Coniston.' Nicholson saw him as the 'Picturesque Figure', 'for in him are combined its three main phases - the aesthetic, the scientific and the moral ...' His scientific approach to the rocks and water of the Lakes, Nicholson argues, was an attempt, not to understand his subject, but to teach people how to react to it in a 'practical and moral' way.

== Sources ==
- Bradshaw, Penny (2011). "Romantic poetic identity and the English Lake District". Transactions of the Cumberland and Westmorland Antiquarian and Archaeological Society. 3. 11: 65–80.doi:10.5284/1064020
- Coleridge, Samuel Taylor (1983). James Engell and W. Jackson Bate (ed.). Biographia literaria : or biographical sketches of my early life and opinions [reprint of 1817 edition]. The collected works of Samuel Taylor Coleridge, v.7. Princeton: Princeton University Press. pp. cxxxvi, 409. ISBN 9780691018614.
- De Quincey, Thomas. Recollections of the Lakes and the Lake Poets. Edited by David Wright; New York, Penguin, 1970.
- Nicholson, Norman (1995). The Lakers : the adventures of the first tourists [reprint of 1955 ed. published by Robert Hale]. Milnthorpe: Cicerone Press. pp. 1–200. ISBN 1852841753.
- Thompson, Ian (2010). The English Lakes : a history. London : New York: Bloomsbury. pp. [viii], [1]-343. ISBN 9780747598381.
- Victoria and Albert Museum (1984). The discovery of the Lake District : a Northern Arcadia and its uses. [London]: V & A. pp. [1]–174. ISBN 0905209966.
