= 1912 in poetry =

Nationality words link to articles with information on the nation's poetry or literature (for instance, Irish or France).

== Events ==
- January – The Poetry Review, edited by Harold Monro, supersedes the Poetical Gazette as the journal of the Poetry Society, just renamed from the Poetry Recital Society.
- April 14–15 – Sinking of the RMS Titanic: The ocean liner RMS Titanic strikes an iceberg and sinks on her maiden voyage from the United Kingdom to the United States. This leads to a flood of Titanic poems, including Thomas Hardy's "The Convergence of the Twain".
- September 2 – American poet Robert Frost arrives in England.
- Indian poet Rabindranath Tagore takes a sheaf of his translated works to England, where they impress W. B. Yeats, Ezra Pound, Robert Bridges, Ernest Rhys, Thomas Sturge Moore and others. Yeats writes the preface to the English translation of Tagore's Gitanjali
- Harriet Munroe founds Poetry: A Magazine of Verse in Chicago (with Ezra Pound as foreign editor); this year she describes its policy this way:

The Open Door will be the policy of this magazine—may the great poet we are looking for never find it shut, or half-shut, against his ample genius! To this end the editors hope to keep free from entangling alliances with any single class or school. They desire to print the best English verse which is being written today, regardless of where, by whom, or under what theory of art it is written. Nor will the magazine promise to limit its editorial comments to one set of opinions.

=== Imagist poets ===
- Three poets meet and work out the principles of Imagist poetry. The most prominent of them, Ezra Pound, writes about the formulation in 1954:

In the spring or early summer of 1912, 'H.D.' [Hilda Doolittle], Richard Aldington and myself decided that we were agreed upon the three principles following:

1. Direct treatment of the 'thing' whether subjective or objective.
2. To use absolutely no word that does not contribute to the presentation.
3. As regarding rhythm: to compose in the sequence of the musical phrase, not in the sequence of a metronome.

- At a meeting with Doolittle and Aldington in the British Museum tea room, Pound appends the signature H.D. Imagiste to Doolittle's poetry, creating a label that is to stick to the poet for most of her writing life
- October – Pound submits to Poetry: A Magazine of Verse three poems each by Doolittle and Aldington under the label Imagiste. Aldington's poems are printed in the November issue, and H.D.'s appear in the January 1913 issue. The March 1913 issue of Poetry also contains Pound's A Few Don'ts by an Imagiste and F. S. Flint's essay Imagisme. This publication history means that Imagism, although London-based, has its first readership in the United States.

== Works published in English ==
=== Australia ===
- Adam Lindsay Gordon, The Poems of Adam Lindsay Gordon

=== Canada ===
- William Henry Drummond, The Poetical Works of William Henry Drummond. New York: G.P. Putnam's Sons. posthumous.
- Pauline Johnson, also known as "Tekahionwake", Flint and Feather, with an introduction by Theodore Watts-Dunton, an English critic
- Seranus, In Northern Skies and Other Poems
- Robert W. Service, Rhymes of a Rolling Stone, Canada

=== India, in English ===
- Sarojini Naidu, The Bird of Time, London; Indian poet writing in English, published in the United Kingdom
- Bharati Sarabhai, The Well of the People, Calcutta: Visva-Bharati
- Rabindranath Tagore, Gitanjali, Indian poet writing in English, published in the United Kingdom

=== United Kingdom ===
- Robert Bridges, Poetical Works Excluding the Eight Dramas
- Walter de la Mare, The Listeners, and Other Poems
- John Drinkwater, Poems of Love and Earth
- Wilfrid Gibson, Fires
- T. E. Hulme, The Complete Poetical Works, five poems
- Rudyard Kipling, Collected Verse
- Edward Marsh (ed.), Georgian Poetry 1911-12, the first Georgian Poetry anthology
- Claude McKay, Constab Ballads; along with Songs of Jamaica (published in Jamaica), constitute the first published collections of English-language, Creole dialect poetry; Jamaican poet published in the United Kingdom
- Sarojini Naidu, The Bird of Time : Songs of Love, Death and the Spring, Indian poet writing in English, published in Britain
- Ezra Pound, American poet published in the United Kingdom:
  - Ripostes, London
  - Translator, The Sonnets and Ballate of Guido Cavalcanti, London
- Isaac Rosenberg, Night and Day
- Dora Sigerson, New Poems
- James Stephens, The Hill of Vision
- Rabindranath Tagore, Gitanjali, Indian poet writing in English, published in Britain

=== United States ===
- Florence Earle Coates (1850–1927), The Unconquered Air, and Other Poems
- Robinson Jeffers, Flagons and Apples
- William Ellery Leonard, The Vaunt of Man
- Vachel Lindsay, Rhymes to be Traded for Bread
- Amy Lowell, A Dome of Many-Coloured Glass
- Edna St. Vincent Millay, "Renascence"
- Ezra Pound, American poet published in the United Kingdom:
  - Ripostes, London
  - Translator, The Sonnets and Ballate of Guido Cavalcanti, London
- John Hall Wheelock, The Beloved Adventure
- Charles Williams, The Silver Stair
- Elinor Wylie, Incidental Numbers

=== Other in English ===
- Claude McKay of Jamaica, publishes the first collections of English-language, Creole dialect poetry:
  - Songs of Jamaica, Kingston, Jamaica
  - Constab Ballads, London, England

== Works published in other languages ==
=== France ===
- Paul Claudel, L'Annonce faite à Marie
- Jean Cocteau, La Danse de Sophocle
- Léon-Paul Fargue, Poemes, suivi de Pour la musique
- Francis Jammes, Les Géorgiques chrétiennes ("Christian Georgics"), three volumes, published from (1911 to this year)
- Pierre Jean Jouve, Présences
- Max Jacob, Les Oeuvres Burlesques et Mystiques de Frère Matorel
- René Maran, La Vie Intérieure, Guyanese writer
- Charles Péguy, Le Porche du mystère de la deuxième vertu
- Saint-John Perse, pen name of Marie-René Alexis Saint-Léger, Eloges
- Victor Segalen, Stèles, an edition of 81 copies (see also Stèles, Peintures, Équipée 1955, and Stelae 1969, a translation into English by Nathaniel Tarn)

=== Indian subcontinent ===
Including all of the British colonies that later became India, Pakistan, Bangladesh, Sri Lanka and Nepal. Listed alphabetically by first name, regardless of surname:

==== Telugu language ====
- Gurajada Appa Rao (surname: Gurajada), narrative poems written in a four-line, stanzaic form, new for Telugu poetry:
  - Kanyaka
  - Purnima

==== Other languages of the Indian subcontinent ====
- Akshay Kumar Baral, Esa, Indian, Bengali-language
- Maithilisharan Gupta, "Bharat Bharati" ("The Voice of India"), Hindi poem glorifying the nation's past, deploring its contemporary social and political condition and calling for good relations between Hindus and Muslims at a time when animosity between the two groups was rising
- Sumatiben Mehta, Hridayjharnan, a poem conveying her anguish during an extended illness (posthumous), written in the Gujarati language

=== Other ===
- Anna Akhmatova, Vecher ("Evening"), her first collection, Russia
- Gottfried Benn, Morgue und andere Gedichte ("Morgue and other Poems") (Berlin), Germany
- David Burliuk, Aleksei Kruchenykh, Vladimir Mayakovsky and Velimir Khlebnikov, A Slap in the Face of Public Taste (Пощёчина общественному вкусу), Russian Futurist anthology
- Takuboku Ishikawa, Kanashiki gangu ("Sad Toys") published posthumously, Japan
- Antonio Machado, Campos de Castilla ("Fields of Castile"), first edition (revised edition 1917); Spain
- Patrick Pearse, Mise Éire ("I am Ireland"), Ireland

== Births ==
Death years link to the corresponding "[year] in poetry" article:

- January 1 – Nikiforos Vrettakos (died 1991), Greek
- February 11 – Roy Fuller (died 1991), English poet and novelist
- February 27 – Lawrence Durrell (died 1990), Indian-born English novelist, poet, dramatist and travel writer
- May 3 – May Sarton (died 1995), American poet, novelist and memoirist
- May 8 – George Woodcock (died 1995), Canadian poet, biographer, academic and prominent anarchist
- May 25 – Meeraji (died 1949), Indian, Urdu-language
- June 12 – Roland Robinson (died 1992), Australian
- June 13 – Hector de Saint-Denys Garneau (died 1943), Canadian poet, considered "Quebec's first truly modern poet"
- June 16 – Enoch Powell (died 1998), English MP from 1950 to 1987, classical scholar and poet
- June 29 – John Gawsworth, born Terence Ian Fytton Armstrong (died 1970), English poet and anthologist
- July 14 – Northrop Frye (died 1991), Canadian critic
- July 26 – Niall Sheridan (died 1998), Irish poet, fiction writer and broadcaster
- August 29 – Kenneth Allott (died 1973) Welsh-born Anglo-Irish poet and academic
- September 10 – William Everson, also known as "Brother Antoninus" (died 1994), American poet, author, literary critic and small-press printer
- September 12 – J. F. Hendry (died 1986), Scottish poet later living in Canada
- September 13 – F. T. Prince (died 2003) South African–British poet and academic
- September 16 – John Jefferson Bray (died 1995), Australian
- September 24 – Ian Serraillier (died 1994), English children's writer
- November 5 – Paul Dehn (died 1976), English screenwriter and poet
- November 12 – Donagh MacDonagh (died 1968), Irish poet, playwright and judge
- December 9 – Denis Glover (died 1980), New Zealand poet and publisher
- December 11 – Micky Burn (died 2010), English writer, journalist, World War II commando and prize-winning poet
- Also:
  - Ali Jafri, Indian, Urdu-language poet
  - P. R. Kaikini, Indian, writing Indian poetry in English
  - Nityananda Mahapatra, Indian, Oriya-language novelist, short-story writer, poet and politician
  - Prahlad Parekh (died 1962), Indian, Gujarati-language
  - Bharati Sarabhai, Indian English- and Gujarati-language playwright, including verse drama
  - Konduru Viraraghavacaryulu, Indian, Telugu-language poet, novelist and scholar

== Deaths ==
Birth years link to the corresponding "[year] in poetry" article:

- January 16 – Georg Heym (born 1887), German poet
- April 13 – Takuboku Ishikawa 石川 啄木 (born 1886), Japanese poet (surname: Ishikawa)
- November 28 – Lorentzos Mavilis (born 1860), Greek
- December 18 – Will Carleton (born 1845), American poet

== See also ==
- Poetry
- List of years in poetry
- Acmeist poetry movement in Russian poetry
- Dymock poets
- Ego-Futurism movement in Russian poetry
- Expressionism movement in German poetry
- Russian Futurism
- Silver Age of Russian Poetry
- Young Poland (Polish: Młoda Polska) modernist period in Polish arts and literature
