= 1902 in poetry =

This article covers 1902 in poetry. Nationality words link to articles with information on the nation's poetry or literature (for instance, Irish or France).

== Events ==
- March 4 – Bisexual English poets Lord Alfred Douglas and Olive Custance marry
- H.D. meets and befriends Ezra Pound
- Times Literary Supplement begins publication

== Works published in English ==
=== Canada ===
- James B. Dollard, also known as "Father Dollard", Irish Mist and Sunshine
- Anna Frances McCollum, Flower Legends and other Poems
- Agnes Ethelwyn Wetherald, Tangled in Stars

=== United Kingdom ===
- Alfred Austin, A Tale of True Love and Other Poems
- Maurice Baring, The Black Prince and Other Poems (published this year; book states "1903")
- Olive Custance, Rainbows
- Walter De la Mare (publishing under the pen name "Walter Ramal"), Songs of Childhood
- Thomas Hardy, Poems of the Past and Present actually published last year, although the book states "1902"
- Thomas MacDonagh, Through the Ivory Gate, Irish poet published in Ireland
- John Edward Masefield, Salt-Water Ballads, including "I must go down to the sea again"
- Alice Meynell, Later Poems
- Henry Newbolt, The Sailing of the Long Ships, and Other Poems
- Laurence Hope, editor, The Garden of Kama and Other Love Lyrics from India, London: Heinemann; anthology; Indian poetry in English, published in the United Kingdom
- Alfred Noyes, The Loom of Years
- Dora Sigerson, The Woman Who Went to Hell, and Other Ballads and Lyrics
- W. B. Yeats, Cathleen Ni Houlihan

=== United States ===
- Elizabeth Akers Allen, The Sunset Song
- Madison Cawein, Kentucky Poems
- John William De Forest, Poem: Medley and Palestrina
- Ellen Glasgow, The Freeman and Other Poems
- James Whitcomb Riley, The Book of Joyous Children
- Edwin Arlington Robinson, Captain Craig
- Trumbull Stickney, Dramatic Verses
- John B. Tabb, Later Lyrics

=== Other in English ===
- Adela Florence Cory Nicolson, editor, The Garden of Kama and Other Love Lyrics from India, London: Heinemann; anthology; Indian poetry in English, published in the United Kingdom

=== Works published in other languages ===
- Francis Jammes, Clairières dans le ciel, France
- Chanda Jha, Gitasaptasati; India, Maithili-language
- Else Lasker-Schüler, Styx, German
- Ștefan Petică, Fecioara în alb. Când vioarele tăcură. Moartea visurilor, Romanian
- Rainer Maria Rilke, The Book of Images, German

== Births ==
Death years link to the corresponding "[year] in poetry" article:

- January 10 – Dobriša Cesarić, Croatian poet and translator (d. 1980)
- February 1 – Langston Hughes (died 1967), African-American jazz poet, novelist, playwright, short story writer and newspaper columnist best known for his role in the Harlem Renaissance
- February 19 – Kay Boyle (died 1992, award-winning American poet, writer, educator and political activist
- February 22 – R. D. Fitzgerald (died 1987), Australian
- April 1 – Maria Polydouri (died 1930), Greek
- May 12 – Clementina Suárez (died 1991), Honduran
- July 3 – Yoshino Hideo (吉野秀雄) (died 1967), Japanese Shōwa period tanka poet
- July 19 – Ada Verdun Howell (died 1981), Australian
- July 28 – Kenneth Fearing (died 1961), American poet and writer
- August 19 – Ogden Nash (died 1971), American poet best known for pithy and funny light verse.
- August 24 – Felipe Alfau (died 1999), Spanish-American poet, translator and author
- September 20 – Stevie Smith (died 1971), British poet and novelist
- September 25 – Chen Xiaocui (suicide 1967), Chinese poet, fiction writer, translator and painter
- October 13 – Arna Bontemps (died 1973), American poet and member of the Harlem Renaissance
- November 1 – Nordahl Grieg (killed in action 1943), Norwegian poet and author.
- November 8 – A. J. M. Smith (died 1980), Canadian
- November 20 – Nazim Hikmet (died 1963), Turkish poet, dramatist and Communist
- December 6 – Michael Roberts (died 1948), English poet, writer, critic, broadcaster and teacher
- December 10 – Dulce María Loynaz (died 1997), Cuban
- December 22 – Evelyn Eaton (died 1983), Canadian novelist, short-story writer, poet and academic

== Deaths ==
- January 20 – Aubrey Thomas De Vere, 88, Irish poet and critic
- April 1 – Thomas Dunn English (born 1819), American politician, poet, author, songwriter who was elected to the United States House of Representatives and had a feud with Edgar Allan Poe
- May 6 – Bret Harte, 66, American author and poet, best remembered for accounts of pioneering life in California
- June 29 – Brunton Stephens (born 1835), Australian
- September 6 – Philip James Bailey, 86, English poet
- September 19 – Masaoka Shiki (正岡 子規), pen-name of Masaoka Tsunenori (正岡 常規), who changed his name to Noboru (升) (born 1867), Japanese author, poet, literary critic, journalist and, early in his life, a baseball player
- September 29 – William McGonagall, Scottish weaver, actor, and poet comically renowned as one of the worst poets in the English language
- October 4 – Lionel Pigot Johnson, 35 (born 1867), English poet, essayist, and critic

== See also ==
- 20th century in poetry
- 20th century in literature
- List of years in poetry
- List of years in literature
- French literature of the 20th century
- Silver Age of Russian Poetry
- Young Poland (Młoda Polska) a modernist period in Polish arts and literature, roughly from 1890 to 1918
- Poetry
