= 19th century in literature =

Literature of the 19th century refers to world literature produced during the 19th century. The range of years is, for the purpose of this article, literature written from (roughly) 1799 to 1900. Many of the developments in literature in this period parallel changes in the visual arts and other aspects of 19th-century culture.

== Literary realism ==
Literary realism is the popular type of literature, beginning with mid nineteenth-century French literature and extending to late-nineteenth- and early-twentieth-century authors, toward depictions of contemporary life and society as it was, or is. In the spirit of general "realism", realist authors opted for depictions of everyday and banal activities and experiences, instead of a romanticized or similarly stylized presentation.

=== Anglophones ===
Lionel Stevenson wrote that "The most explosive impact in English literature during the nineteenth century is unquestionably Thomas Carlyle's. From about 1840 onward, no author of prose or poetry was immune from his influence."

George Eliot's novel Middlemarch stands as a great milestone in the realist tradition. It is a primary example of nineteenth-century realism's role in the naturalization of the burgeoning capitalist marketplace.

William Dean Howells was the first American author to bring a realist aesthetic to the literature of the United States. His stories of 1850s Boston upper-crust life are highly regarded among scholars of American fiction. His most popular novel, The Rise of Silas Lapham, depicts a man who falls from materialistic fortune by his own mistakes. Stephen Crane has also been recognized as illustrating important aspects of realism to American fiction in the stories Maggie: A Girl of the Streets and The Open Boat.

=== Latin American Literature ===
Adventure novels about the gold rush in Chile in the 1850s, such as Martin Rivas by Alberto Blest Gana, and the gaucho epic poem Martin Fierro by Argentine José Hernández are among the iconic and populist 19th century literary works written in Spanish, published in Latin America.

=== Zenith ===
Honoré de Balzac is often credited with pioneering a systematic realism in French literature, through the inclusion of specific detail and recurring characters. Fyodor Dostoyevsky, Leo Tolstoy, Gustave Flaubert, and Ivan Turgenev are regarded by critics such as FR Leavis as representing the zenith of the realist style with their unadorned prose and attention to the details of everyday life. In German literature, 19th-century realism developed under the name of "Poetic Realism" or "Bourgeois Realism", and major figures include Theodor Fontane, Gustav Freytag, Gottfried Keller, Wilhelm Raabe, Adalbert Stifter, and Theodor Storm. Later "realist" writers included Benito Pérez Galdós, Nikolai Leskov, Guy de Maupassant, Anton Chekhov, José Maria de Eça de Queiroz, Machado de Assis, Bolesław Prus and, in a sense, Émile Zola, whose naturalism is often regarded as an offshoot of realism.

== People ==
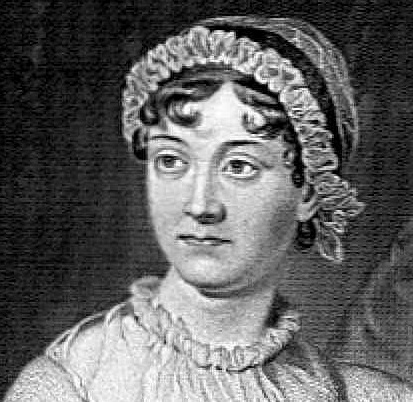
Jane Austen

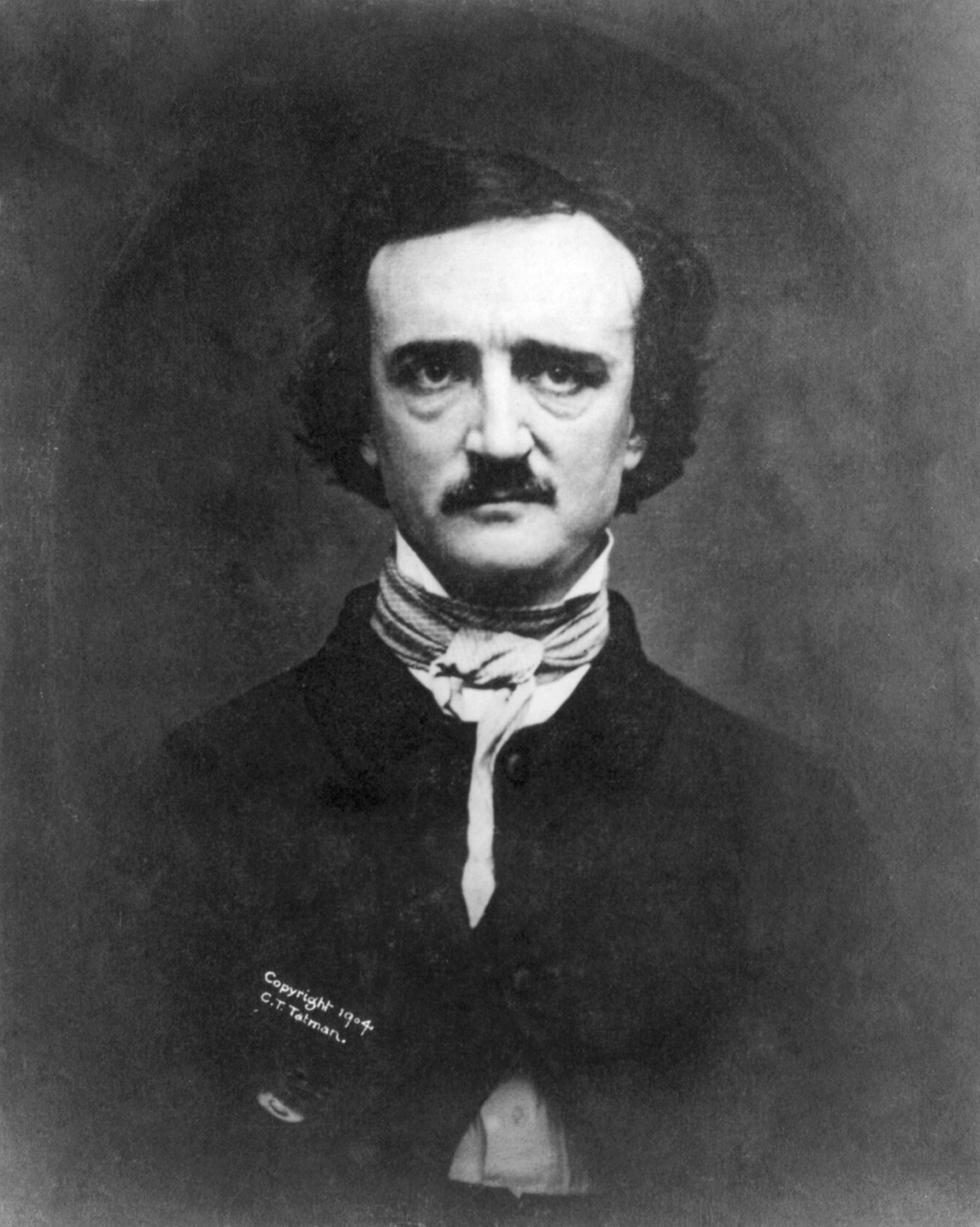
Edgar Allan Poe

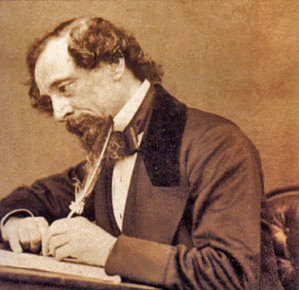
Charles Dickens

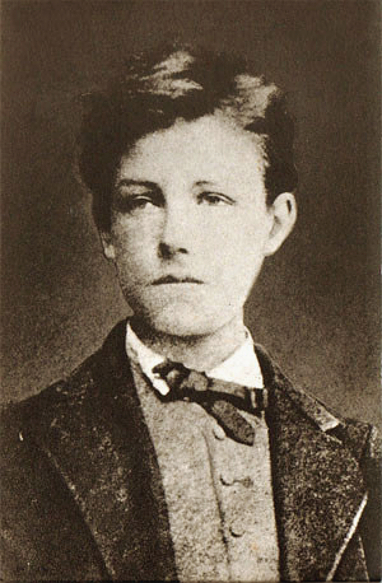
Arthur Rimbaud c. 1872

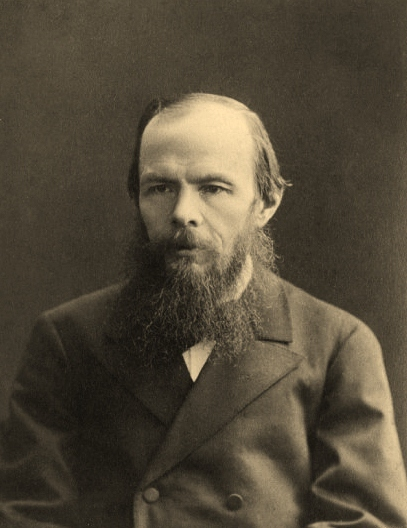
Fyodor Dostoyevsky, 1879

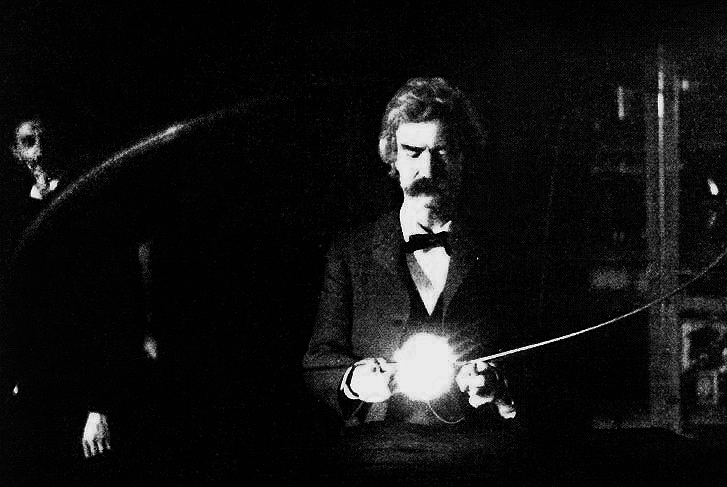
Mark Twain, 1894

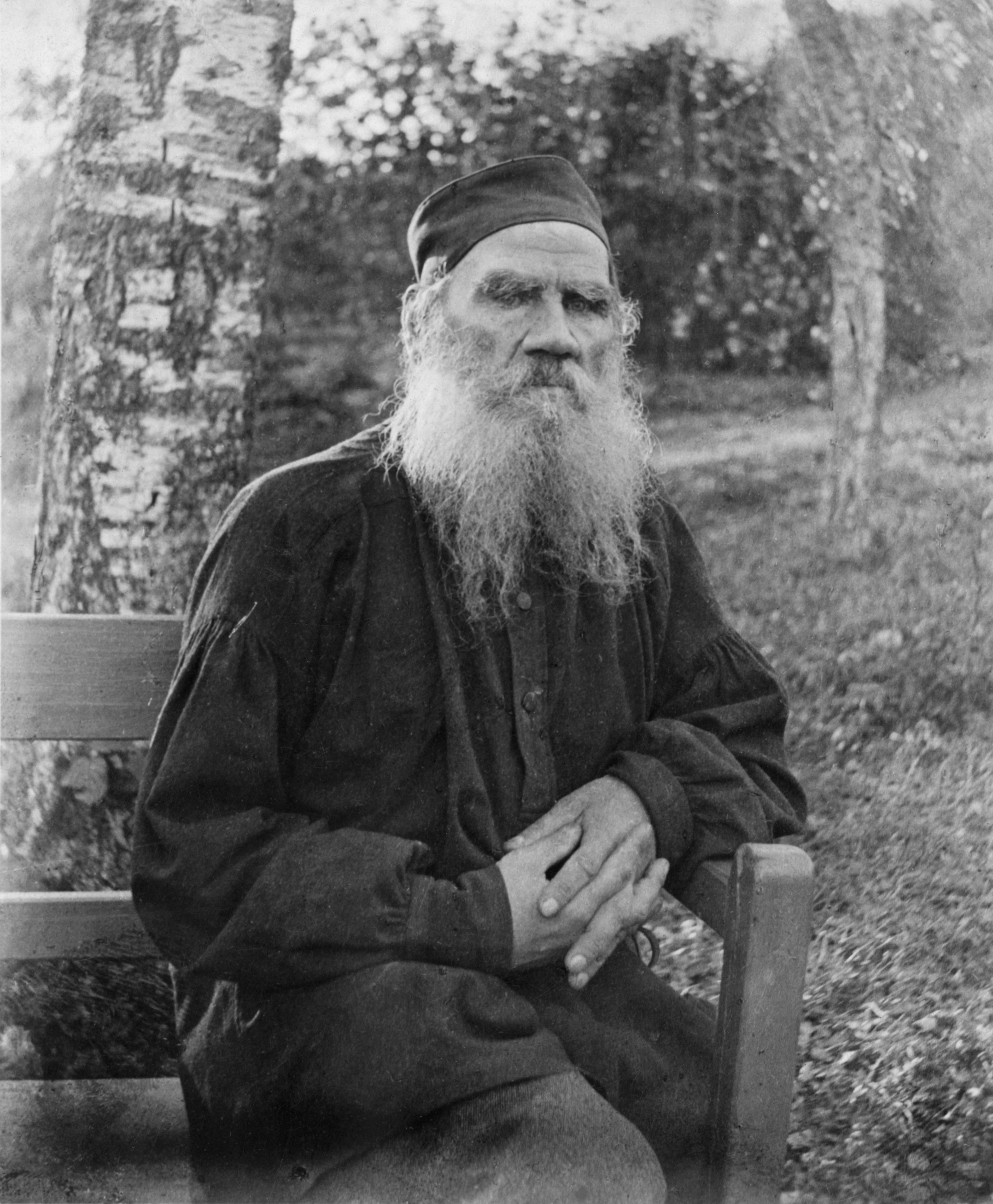
Leo Tolstoy, 1897

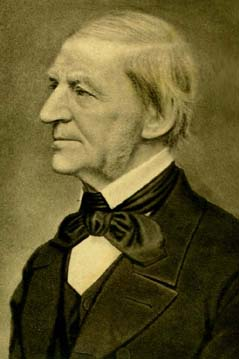
Ralph Waldo Emerson

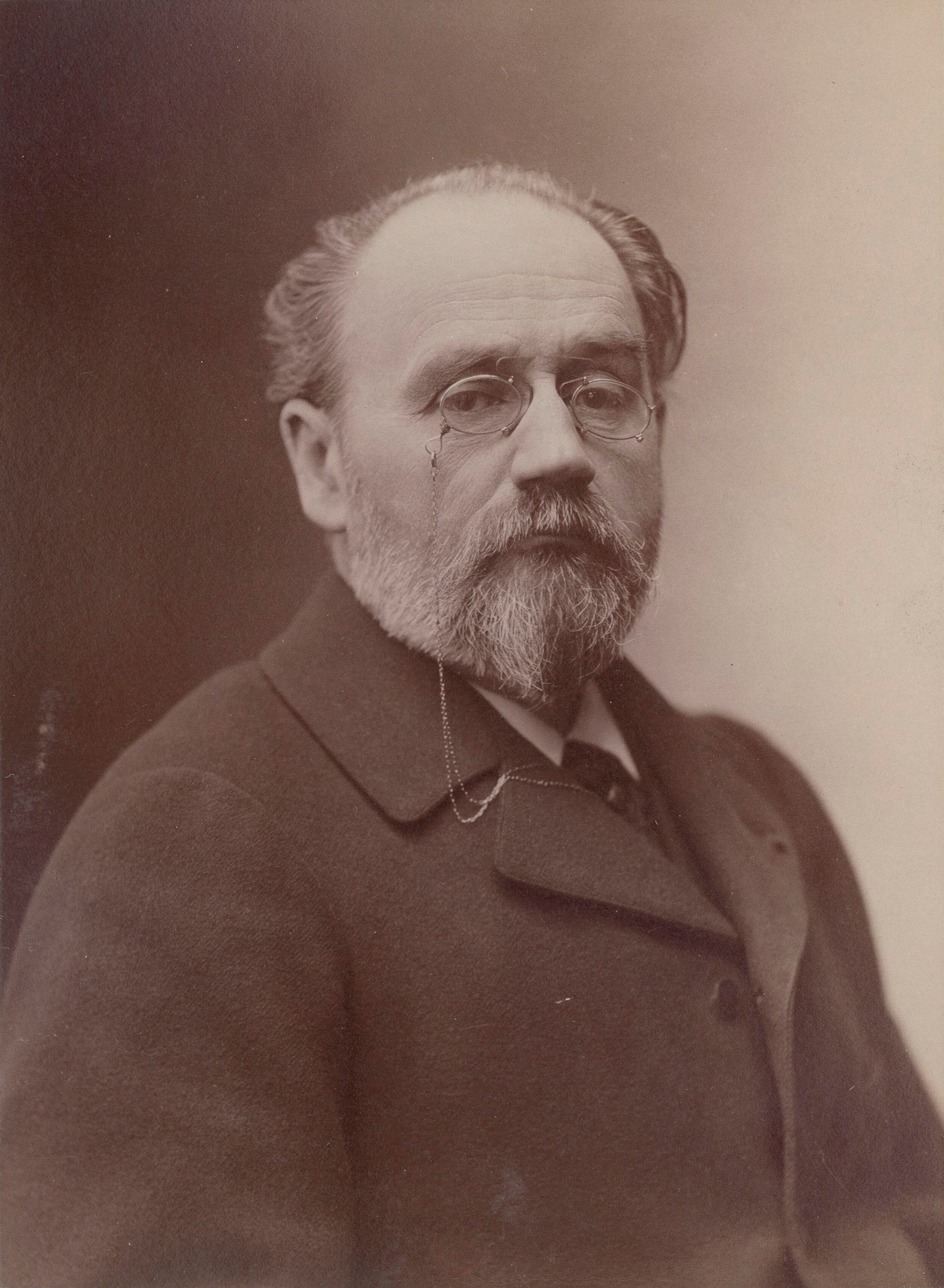
Émile Zola, c. 1900

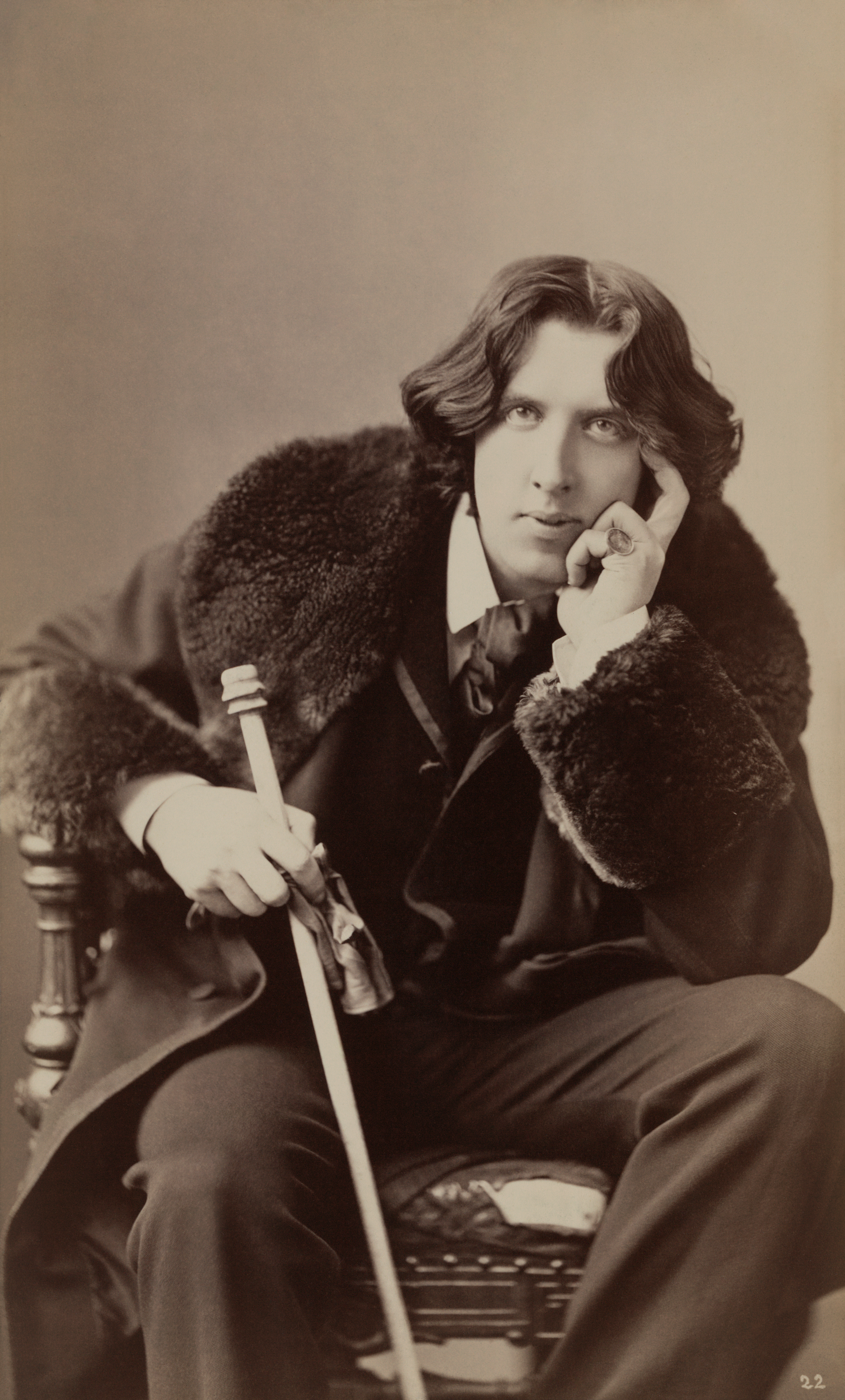
Oscar Wilde

- Leopoldo Alas
- Louisa May Alcott
- Hans Christian Andersen
- Machado de Assis
- Jane Austen
- Gertrudis Gómez de Avellaneda
- Gustavo Adolfo Bécquer
- Honoré de Balzac
- Alberto Blest Gana
- Elizabeth Barrett Browning
- Charles Baudelaire
- Richard Beatniffe
- Anne Brontë
- Charlotte Brontë
- Emily Brontë
- Georg Büchner
- Ivan Bunin
- Lord Byron
- Hall Caine
- Lewis Carroll
- Thomas Carlyle
- Rosalía de Castro
- François-René de Chateaubriand
- Anton Chekhov
- Kate Chopin
- Samuel Taylor Coleridge
- James Fenimore Cooper
- Stephen Crane
- Eduard Douwes Dekker
- Emily Dickinson
- Charles Dickens
- Fyodor Dostoevsky
- Arthur Conan Doyle
- Alexandre Dumas, père
- Alexandre Dumas, fils
- Paul Dunbar
- José Maria Eça de Queirós
- José Echegaray
- George Eliot (Mary Ann Evans)
- Ralph Waldo Emerson
- Gustave Flaubert
- Theodor Fontane
- Margaret Fuller
- Elizabeth Gaskell
- Johann Wolfgang von Goethe
- Nikolai Gogol
- Manuel González Prada
- Juana Manuela Gorriti
- Brothers Grimm
- Henry Rider Haggard
- Ida Gräfin Hahn-Hahn
- Thomas Hardy
- Francis Bret Harte
- Nathaniel Hawthorne
- Friedrich Hölderlin
- Heinrich Heine
- Victor Hugo
- Henrik Ibsen
- Washington Irving
- Henry James
- John Keats
- Gottfried Keller
- Rudyard Kipling
- Caroline Kirkland
- Jules Laforgue
- Giacomo Leopardi
- Mikhail Lermontov
- Nikolai Leskov
- Jack London
- Stéphane Mallarmé
- Alessandro Manzoni
- José Martí
- Clorinda Matto de Turner
- Herman Melville
- Guy de Maupassant
- John Neal
- Friedrich Nietzsche
- José María de Pereda
- Benito Pérez Galdós
- Edgar Allan Poe
- Marcel Proust
- Bolesław Prus
- Aleksandr Pushkin
- Fritz Reuter
- Arthur Rimbaud
- John Ruskin
- George Sand (Amandine-Aurore-Lucile Dupin)
- Mary Shelley
- Percy Shelley
- Henryk Sienkiewicz
- Stendhal (Marie-Henri Beyle)
- Robert Louis Stevenson
- Adalbert Stifter
- Bram Stoker
- Theodor Storm
- Harriet Beecher Stowe
- Alfred, Lord Tennyson
- Henry David Thoreau
- Leo Tolstoy
- Ivan Turgenev
- Mark Twain
- Juan Valera y Alcalá-Galiano
- Giovanni Verga
- Paul Verlaine
- Jules Verne
- Lew Wallace
- H. G. Wells
- Edith Wharton
- Walt Whitman
- Oscar Wilde
- William Wordsworth
- Émile Zola
- José Zorrilla

== By language ==
- Golden Age of Russian Poetry
- 19th-century French literature

== By year ==
1800s – 1810s – 1820s – 1830s – 1840s – 1850s – 1860s – 1870s – 1880s – 1890s – 1900s

== See also ==
- 19th century#Literature
- Kailyard school
