= 1830 in poetry =

| List of years in poetry | (table) |
- … 1820; 1821; 1822; 1823; 1824; 1825; 1826; 1827; 1828; 1829; 1830; 1831; 1832; 1833; 1834; 1835; 1836; 1837; 1838; 1839; 1840 …
- In literature 1827 1828 1829 1830 1831 1832 1833
- Art; Archaeology; Architecture; Literature; Music; Philosophy; Science; +...

Nationality words link to articles with information on the nation's poetry or literature (for instance, Irish or France).

== Events ==
- Godey's Lady's Book, the most popular women's magazine of the 19th century in the United States, is founded in Philadelphia by Louise Antoine Godey. Its circulation would reach 150,000. The magazine contained recipes, articles on beauty and health, sentimental and didactic writing and book reviews as well as the work of Ralph Waldo Emerson, Henry Wadsworth Longfellow, Oliver Wendell Holmes, Edgar Allan Poe and Harriet Beecher Stowe. The magazine lasted until 1898
- In Germany, a loose group of writers known as Young Germany (Junges Deutschland) begins to flourish this year. The movement continues until 1850
- La bibliothèque canadienne, a French Canadian magazine edited by Michel Bibaud, ceases publication this year (it began in 1825)

== Works ==
=== United Kingdom ===
- Thomas Aird, The Captive of Fez
- Lord Byron, Letters and Journals of Lord Byron, edited by Thomas Moore, biographical
- Samuel Taylor Coleridge and Robert Southey, anonymously published, The Devil's Walk; original version published in the Morning Post, September 6, 1799 as "The Devil's Thoughts"
- George Croly, Poetical Works
- Ebenezer Elliott, Corn Law Rhymes: The Ranter
- Caroline Fry, anonymously published, The Listener, poetry and prose
- John Abraham Heraud, anonymously published, The Descent into Hell
- Richard Lower, Tom Cladpole's Jurney to Lunnon, told by himself, and written in pure Sussex doggerel by his Uncle Tim, sells at least twenty thousand copies
- Robert Montgomery, Satan
- Caroline Norton
  - The Undying One and Other Poems
  - The Faithless Knight
- Alfred Tennyson, Poems, Chiefly Lyrical, including "The Kraken" and "Mariana" (see also Poems 1842)
- Charles Tennyson (later Charles Tennyson Turner), Sonnets and Fugitive Pieces

=== United States ===
- Sarah Josepha Hale, Poems for Our Children, written at Lowell Mason's request; includes "Mary's Lamb", with the verse "Mary Had a Little Lamb"; this poem and some others would be reprinted in McGuffy Readers and in various anthologies many times, without credit given to the author
- Oliver Wendell Holmes, "Old Ironsides", written after the author becomes angry that the USS Constitution, a navy ship that had seen service in the Tripolitan War and the War of 1812 was to be scrapped; first published in the Boston Daily Advertiser and reprinted nationwide, the poem saved the ship from destruction.
- George Pope Morris, "Woodman, Spare That Tree!", a popular poem praised by Edgar Allan Poe, who described it as a work "of which any poet, living or dead, might justly be proud"; first published in the New York Mirror and later included in The Deserted Bride and Other Poems in 1838; frequently published in schoolbooks and reprinted in support of conservation efforts
- William Gilmore Simms, Tricolor, or Three Days of Blood in Paris

=== Other in English ===
- Kasiprasad Ghose, Shair and Other Poems, the first volume of poetry by an Indian in English
- Adam Kidd, The Huron Chief, and Other Poems, Montreal: "Printed at the Office of the Herald and New Gazette", Canada

== Works published in other languages ==
=== French language ===
==== French Canada ====
- Michel Bibaud, Épitres, satires, chansons, épigrammes et autres pièces de vers; French language; Montreal: Ludger Duvernay, a l'Imprimerie de Minerve, the first book of French poetry published in Canada

==== France ====
- Théophile Gautier, Poésies, 42 poems in a wide variety of verse forms, often imitating other, more established Romantic poets such as Sainte-Beuve, Alphonse de Lamartine, and Victor Hugo; composed when the author was 18 years old; since publication took place during the July Revolution, no copies were sold and it was eventually withdrawn (reissued in 1832 with 20 additional poems under the name Albertus; revised edition, 1845)
- Alphonse de Lamartine, Harmonies poétiques et religieuses
- Alfred de Musset, Comtes d'Espagne et d'Italie
- Charles-Augustin Sainte-Beuve, Les Consolations

== Births ==
Death years link to the corresponding "[year] in poetry" article:

- January 1 - Paul Hamilton Hayne (died 1886) Southern American poet, critic and editor
- January 11 - Cornelia J. M. Jordan (died 1898) American poet and lyricist
- May 5 - Thomas Edward Brown (died 1897), Manx poet, scholar and theologian
- September 8 - Frédéric Mistral (died 1914), French poet who led the 19th century revival of Occitan (Provençal) language and literature, a key figure in the literary Félibrige movement, and one of two winners of the 1904 Nobel Prize in Literature for his contributions in literature and philology
- October 18 - Helen Hunt Jackson (died 1885) American poet and writer
- December 5 - Christina Rossetti (died 1894) English poet
- December 10 - Emily Dickinson (died 1886), American poet
- December 23 - Charlotte Alington Barnard (died 1869) English poet and composer of ballads and hymns

== Deaths ==
Death years link to the corresponding "[year] in poetry" article:

- January 17 – Wilhelm Waiblinger (born 1804), German Romantic poet
- August 20 – Vasily Pushkin (born 1766), Russian poet
- September 18 – William Hazlitt (born 1778), English writer, essayist and critic
- September 23 – A. Flowerdew (born 1759), English poet and hymnist

== See also ==
- Poetry
- List of years in poetry
- List of years in literature
- 19th century in poetry
- 19th century in literature
- Golden Age of Russian Poetry (1800–1850)
- Weimar Classicism period in Germany, commonly considered to have begun in 1788 and to have ended either in 1805, with the death of Friedrich Schiller, or 1832, with the death of Goethe
- Lists of poets
