= 1838 in poetry =

List of years in poetry	(table)
- … 1828; 1829; 1830; 1831; 1832; 1833; 1834; 1835; 1836; 1837; 1838; 1839; 1840; 1841; 1842; 1843; 1844; 1845; 1846; 1847; 1848 …
- In literature 1835 1836 1837 1838 1839 1840 1841
- Art; Archaeology; Architecture; Literature; Music; Philosophy; Science; +...

Nationality words link to articles with information on the nation's poetry or literature (for instance, Irish or France).

== Events ==
- Jane Johnston Schoolcraft writes the first known poems in the Ojibwe language.
- William Wordsworth granted an honorary Doctor of Civil Law degree by Durham University.
- December 13 - Irish-born Australian poet Eliza Hamilton Dunlop's "The Aboriginal Mother" is first published, in The Australian newspaper, between the perpetrators of the Myall Creek massacre (which it commemorates) being sentenced and hanged.

== Works published ==
=== United Kingdom ===
- Elizabeth Barrett, later Elizabeth Barrett Browning, The Seraphim, and Other Poems
- Alexander Bethune, written with John Bethune, Tales and Sketches of the Scottish Peasantry
- Richard Hurrell Froude, died 1836, edited by John Keble and John Henry Newman, Remains of the late Richard Hurrell Froude
- Leigh Hunt Abou Ben Adhem and "Jenny Kissed Me"
- Letitia Elizabeth Landon, died October 15, writing under the pen name "L.E.L.", Fisher's Drawing Room Scrap Book, 1839
- Monckton Milnes, Memorials of Residence upon the Continent and Poems of Many Years
- Robert Southey, The Poetical Works of Robert Southey, volumes 3-5 (first two volumes published in 1837)
- Isaac Williams, The Cathedral; or, The Catholic and Apostolic Church in England
- William Wordsworth's The Sonnets of William Wordsworth

=== United States ===
- George Moses Horton, Hope of Liberty — Poems by a Slave, a third edition of Hope of Liberty, originally published in 1829 together with poetry by Phillis Wheatley; a second edition was published in Philadelphia in 1837 by an abolitionist group, as was this Boston edition; Horton (still alive, unlike Wheatley) received no royalties (although he slave was trying to earn money for his freedom), and likely didn't even know that these editions had been published in the North
- James Russell Lowell, "Class Poem", the author's first published poem, a satire on new ideas and reforms, including Transcendentalism, abolitionism, women's rights and temperance; Lowell later supported many of these ideas and grew to regret writing humorously at their expense
- George Pope Morris, The Deserted Bride and Other Poems, the first of numerous editions; includes the author's most popular poem, "Woodman, Spare That Tree!" (which had originally been published in the New York Mirror 1830)
- John Greenleaf Whittier, Poems, expanded edition of the unauthorized work published in 1837

=== Other ===
- Emil Aarestrup, Digte ("Poems"), also called Erotiske Situationer ("Erotic Situations"); Denmark
- August Kopisch, Agrumi, volksthümliche Posien aus allen Mundarten Italiens und seiner Inseln, Germany

== Births ==
Death years link to the corresponding "[year] in poetry" article:

- January 29 - David Gray, Scottish (died 1861)
- February 5 (?) - Abram Joseph Ryan, American (died 1886)
- February 16 - Henry Adams, American historian and poet (died 1918)
- February 22 - Margaret Elizabeth Sangster, American (died 1912)
- June 13 - Elizabeth Otis Dannelly American Southern poet (died 1896)
- June 26 - Bankim Chandra Chattopadhyay, Bengali (died 1894)
- September 20 - William Reed Huntington, American (died 1909)
- September 21 - Charles Mair, Canadian (died 1927)
- October 8 - John Hay, American statesman and poet (died 1905)
- Date not known - Sarah Elizabeth Carmichael, American (died 1901)

== Deaths ==
Birth years link to the corresponding "[year] in poetry" article:

- March 12 - Richard Polwhele, Cornish historian and poet (born 1760)
- July 11 - Charles Morris, Anglo Irish army officer and songwriter (born c. 1745)
- October 15 - Letitia Elizabeth Landon, English (born 1802)
- November 7 - Anne Grant, Scottish poet and author (born 1755)
- November 25 - Margaret Miller Davidson, American, sister to Lucretia Maria Davidson (born 1823)
- December 18 - Annabella Plumptre, English writer and poet (born 1769)

== See also ==
- 19th century in poetry
- 19th century in literature
- List of years in poetry
- List of years in literature
- Victorian literature
- French literature of the 19th century
- Biedermeier era of German literature
- List of years in poetry
- Golden Age of Russian Poetry (1800–1850)
- Young Germany (Junges Deutschland) a loose group of German writers from about 1830 to 1850
- List of poets
- Poetry
- List of poetry awards
