= 1843 in poetry =

List of years in poetry	(table)
- … 1833; 1834; 1835; 1836; 1837; 1838; 1839; 1840; 1841; 1842; 1843; 1844; 1845; 1846; 1847; 1848; 1849; 1850; 1851; 1852; 1853 …
- In literature 1840 1841 1842 1843 1844 1845 1846
- Art; Archaeology; Architecture; Literature; Music; Philosophy; Science; +...

Nationality words link to articles with information on the nation's poetry or literature (for instance, Irish or France).

== Events ==
- April 4 – William Wordsworth accepts the office of Poet Laureate of the United Kingdom (following the death of Robert Southey on March 21) on being assured that it is regarded as a purely honorific position.

== Works published ==
=== United Kingdom ===
- R. S. Hawker, Reeds Shaken with the Wind
- Thomas Hood, "The Song of the Shirt", a poem (published in the Christmas issue of Punch)
- Richard Henry Horne, Orion: An epic poem

=== United States ===
- William Ellery Channing (poet), Poems, published at the expense of the author's friend Samuel Gray Ward; the volume is admired by Ralph Waldo Emerson and Henry David Thoreau but condemned by Edgar Allan Poe in "Our Amateur Poets", an essay in Graham's
- Thomas Dunn English, "Ben Bolt", a popular ballad written for the New York Mirror and later set to music numerous times
- William Lloyd Garrison, Sonnets
- James Russell Lowell, Miscellaneous Poems
- Cornelius Mathews, Poems on Man in His Various Aspects under the American Republic
- William Gilmore Simms, Donna Florida, a verse tale; Charleston
- James Gates Percival, The Dream of a Day
- John Pierpont, The Anti-Slavery Poems of John Pierpont
- Elizabeth Oakes Smith, The Sinless Child and Other Poems, acclaimed by critics, including Edgar Allan Poe
- John Greenleaf Whittier, Lays of My Home and Other Poems, regional poetry, including "The Merrimack", "The Funeral Tree of the Sokokis", "The Ballad of Cassandra Southwick" and "Massachusetts to Virginia"
- Nathaniel Parker Willis:
  - The Sacred Poems
  - Poems of Passion
  - The Lady Jane and Other Poems

=== Other ===
- Hilario Ascasubi, El gaucho Jacinto Cielo con doce números, Argentina
- Marceline Desbordes-Valmore, Bouquets et prières, France
- Christian Winther, Til Een ("To Someone"); see also revised edition 1849; Denmark
- Gonçalves Dias, "Canção do exílio", Brazil
- Mikhail Lermontov, "Valerik", Russia, posthumously in the anthology Dawn
- Betty Paoli, Nach dem Gewitter ("After the Storm"), Austria

== Births ==
Death years link to the corresponding "[year] in poetry" article:

- February 24 – Violet Fane, pen name of Lady Mary Currie, née Mary Montgomerie Lamb (died 1905), English novelist, poet and essayist
- May 3 – Edward Dowden (died 1913), Irish-born poet and critic
- August 19 – Charles Montagu Doughty (died 1926), English poet, writer and traveller
- December 7 – Helena Nyblom, née Roed (died 1926), Danish-born poet and writer of fairy tales
- December 21 – Thomas Bracken (died 1898), Irish-born New Zealander
- December 24 (December 12 O.S.) – Lydia Koidula, born Lydia Jannsen (died 1886), Estonian
- Undated – Dimitrios Paparrigopoulos (died 1873), Greek

== Deaths ==
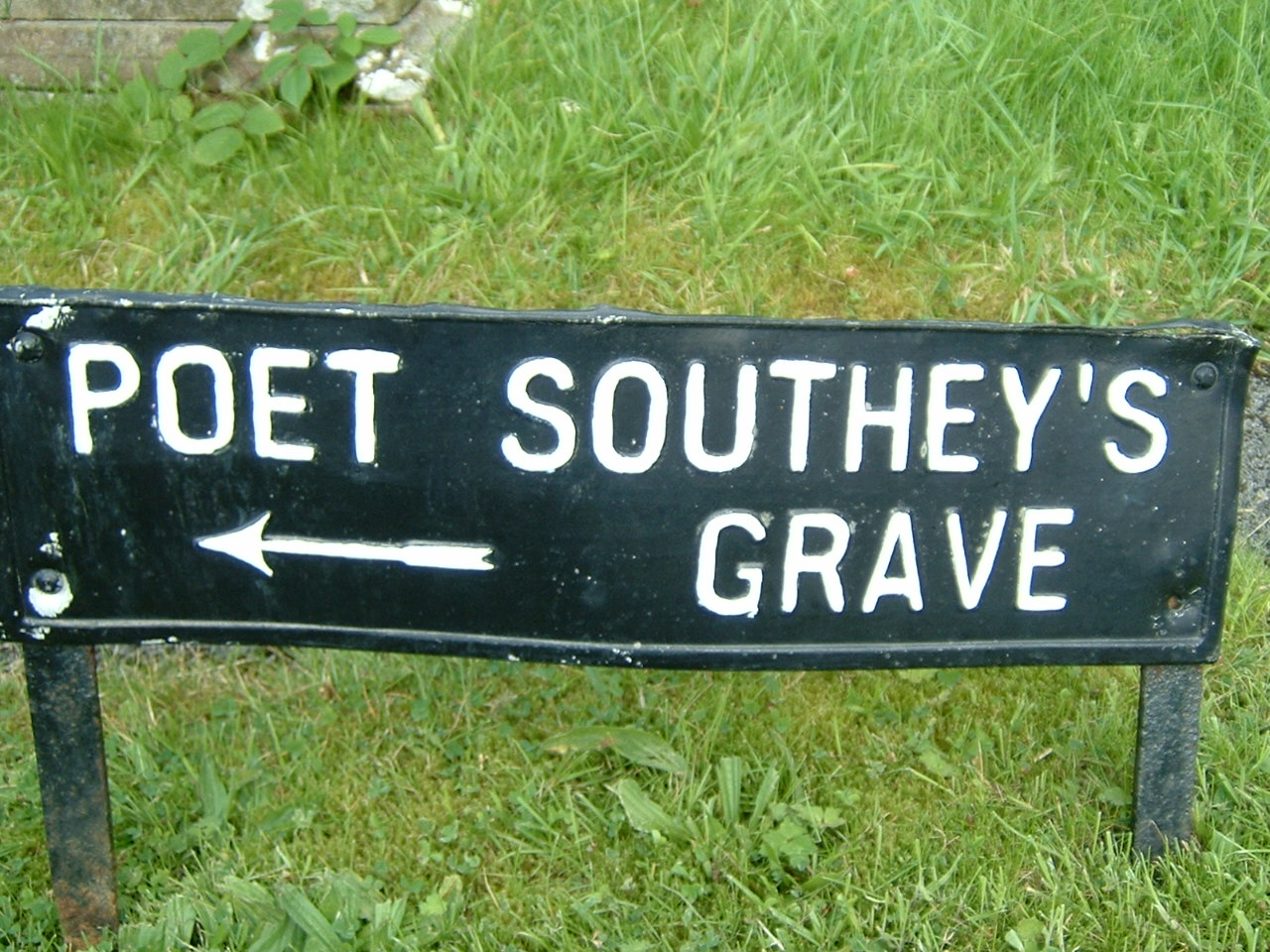
Sign to Robert Southey's grave, St. Kentigern's Churchyard, Crosthwaite, Cumbria, England

Death years link to the corresponding "[year] in poetry" article:

- January 11 – Francis Scott Key (born 1779), American lawyer, author, and amateur poet who wrote the words to the United States' national anthem, "The Star-Spangled Banner"
- March 21 – Robert Southey (born 1774), English Poet Laureate
- June 6 – Friedrich Hölderlin (born 1770), German lyric poet
- July 9 – Washington Allston, 63 (born 1779), American poet and painter
- December 11 - Casimir Delavigne (born 1793), French poet and dramatist

== See also ==
- 19th century in poetry
- 19th century in literature
- List of years in poetry
- List of years in literature
- Victorian literature
- French literature of the 19th century
- Biedermeier era of German literature
- Golden Age of Russian Poetry (1800–1850)
- Young Germany (Junges Deutschland) a loose group of German writers from about 1830 to 1850
- List of poets
- Poetry
- List of poetry awards
