= 1802 in poetry =

Nationality words link to articles with information on the nation's poetry or literature (for instance, Irish or France).

== Events ==
- 29 January – Greenock Burns Club holds the first Burns dinner, in Alloway, in honour of Scottish poet Robert Burns (died 1796).
- 15 April – William Wordsworth and his sister Dorothy, walking by Ullswater near their home in the Lake District of England, come across a "long belt" of daffodils, a circumstance which inspires his poem "I Wandered Lonely as a Cloud", written in 1804, first published in 1807 and in revised form in 1815. It is titled "The Daffodils" in some anthologies.
- 3 May–9 – Having recollected in tranquility while walking on Barton Fell near Ullswater an experience of despondency, William Wordsworth writes "The Leech-Gatherer", the first draft of his poem "Resolution and Independence" (published in 1807).
- Summer – Adam Oehlenschläger writes at a sitting the poem "Guldhornene", introducing Romanticism into Danish poetry.
- 31 July – William Wordsworth, leaving London for Dover and Calais with Dorothy, witnesses the early morning scene which he captures in his Petrarchan sonnet "Composed upon Westminster Bridge". In Calais, he will meet his 9-year-old illegitimate daughter Caroline for the first time.
- 4 October – Wordsworth marries Mary Hutchinson at Brompton, Scarborough.
- Henry Boyd completes the first full English translation of Dante's Divine Comedy.

== Poetry published ==
=== United Kingdom ===
- Anne Bannerman, Tales of Superstition and Chivalry, Scottish Gothic ballad collection
- Robert Bloomfield, Rural Tales, Ballads and Songs
- Sir Alexander Boswell, Songs, Chiefly in the Scottish Dialect
- Samuel Taylor Coleridge, Dejection: An Ode, first published 4 October 1802, in the Morning Post (see also Wordsworth and Coleridge, Lyrical Ballads, below, in which the poem is again published this year)
- George Dyer, Poems
- William Gifford, The Satires of Decimus Junius Juvenalis
- Joseph Ritson, Ancient English Metrical Romances
- Walter Savage Landor, Poetry by the author of Gebir
- Amelia Opie, Poems
- Tadhg Gaelach Ó Súilleabháin (died 1795), Timothy O'Sullivan's Pious Miscellany, Irish Gaelic language poet published in Ireland
- Walter Scott, editor, Minstrelsy of the Scottish Border (1802–03), an anthology of ballads
- William Wordsworth and Samuel Taylor Coleridge, new edition of Lyrical Ballads, with Pastoral and Other Poems, published under Wordsworth's name but with poems by Coleridge as well; Preface of 1801 expanded and texts of numerous poems amended; includes Coleridge's "Dejection: An Ode" (Later, revised editions: 1798, 1801, 1805)

=== Other ===
- John Blair Linn, The Powers of Genius, A Poem, in Three Parts, By John Blair Linn ... Second Edition, Corrected and Enlarged, Philadelphia: John Conrad, & Co.; sold by M. and J. Conrad & Co., United States
- Charles Morris, Songs Political and Convivial, United States

== Births ==
Death years link to the corresponding "[year] in poetry" article:

- 11 February – Lydia Maria Child (died 1880), American abolitionist, women's rights activist, Indian rights activist, novelist, journalist and poet; author of "Over the River and Through the Woods"
- 26 February – Victor Hugo (died 1885), French novelist, playwright and poet
- 14 March – Rangga Warsita (died 1873), Javanese
- 28 July – Winthrop Mackworth Praed (died 1839) English politician and poet
- 14 August – Letitia Elizabeth Landon, also known as "L.E.L." (died 1838), English poet and novelist
- 28 August – Thomas Aird (died 1876), Scottish
- 1 October – Edward Coote Pinkney (died 1828), American poet, lawyer, sailor, professor, and editor
- 10 October – George Pope Morris (died 1864), American editor, poet, and songwriter
- 23 December – Sara Coleridge (died 1852), English poet and translator; daughter of Samuel Taylor Coleridge
- 31 December – Richard Henry Horne (died 1884), English poet, critic and journalist, and public official in Australia
- date not known – Isaac Williams (died 1865) English poet and tractarian, a prominent member of the Oxford Movement

== Deaths ==
Birth years link to the corresponding "[year] in poetry" article:

- 18 April – Erasmus Darwin (born 1731), English physician, natural philosopher, physiologist, inventor and poet (grandfather of Charles Darwin)
- 17 September – Richard Owen Cambridge (born 1717), English
- Also:
  - Sophia Burrell (born 1750), English poet and playwright
  - Christoph Friedrich Sangerhausen (born 1740), German

== See also ==
- List of years in poetry
- List of years in literature
- 19th century in literature
- 19th century in poetry
- Romantic poetry
- Golden Age of Russian Poetry (1800–1850)
- Weimar Classicism period in Germany, commonly considered to have begun in 1788 and to have ended either in 1805, with the death of Friedrich Schiller, or 1832, with the death of Goethe
- List of poets
- Poetry

== Notes ==
- "A Timeline of English Poetry" Web page of the Representative Poetry Online Web site, University of Toronto
