= Frederick Thomas =

Frederick or Fred Thomas may refer to:

== Sportspeople ==
- Fred Thomas (baseball manager), Major League Baseball manager of the 1887 Indianapolis Hoosiers
- Fred Thomas (third baseman) (1892–1986), Major League Baseball player
- Fred Thomas (cornerback) (born 1973), former American football cornerback
- Frederick Hall Thomas (1886–1927), birth name of boxer Freddie Welsh
- Fred Thomas (wrestler) (born 1938), former wrestler from New Zealand
- Freddie Thomas (cricketer) (1917–2003), Scottish cricketer
- Freddie Thomas (rugby union) (born 2001), English rugby union player
- Fred Thomas (American football coach), American football coach
- Fred Thomas (athlete) (1923–1981), Canadian multi-sport athlete

== Politicians ==
- Frederick William Thomas (politician), Lord Mayor of Melbourne
- Fred Thomas (Australian politician) (1882–1960), Australian politician
- Fred A. Thomas (1865–1958), Montana State Representative
- Fred Thomas (American politician) (born 1958), Majority Leader of the Montana Senate
- Fred Thomas (British politician) (born 1992), British politician

== Music ==
- Fred Thomas (bassist), bassist best known for his work with James Brown
- Fred Thomas (rock musician) (born 1976), indie rock musician best known for starting the band Saturday Looks Good to Me

== Others ==
- Frederick Bruce Thomas (1872–1928), son of former Mississippi slaves who became a prominent citizen of Moscow and, later, Constantinople
- Frederick William Thomas (writer) (1806–1866), American writer
- Frederick William Thomas (philologist) (1867–1956), Indologist and Tibetologist
- F. W. L. Thomas (Frederick William Leopold Thomas, c. 1812–1885), Royal Navy officer, photographer, and historian
- Frederick Jennings Thomas (1786–1855), British Royal Navy rear admiral

== See also ==
- Frédéric Thomas (disambiguation)
