= 1832 in poetry =

Nationality words link to articles with information on the nation's poetry or literature (for instance, Irish or France).

== Events ==
- The Weimar Classicism period in Germany is commonly considered to have begun in 1788) and to have ended either in 1805, with the death of Schiller, or this year, with the death of Goethe
- Thomas Jefferson Hogg, a friend of Percy Bysshe Shelley, contributed to Bulwer-Lytton's New Monthly Magazine his "Reminiscences of Shelley", which was highly regarded. As a result, Hogg will later write a biography of Shelley.

== Works published in English ==
=== United Kingdom ===
- W. E. Aytoun, Poland, Homer, and Other Poems
- Henry Glassford Bell, My Old Portfolio; or, Tales and Sketches
- William Lisle Bowles, St. John in Patmos
- John Donald Carrick, ed., Whistle Binkie, anthology of Scottish poetry
- Barry Cornwall, see Bryan Waller Proctor, below
- James Hogg, writing under the pen name "The Ettrick Shepherd", Altrive Tales
- Leigh Hunt, The Poetical Works of Leigh Hunt published by subscription
- Thomas Miller, Songs of the Sea Nymphs
- Bryan Waller Proctor, writing under the pen name "Barry Cornwall", English Songs
- Percy Bysshe Shelley, The Masque of Anarchy, posthumous, preface by Leigh Hunt
- Alfred Tennyson, Poems, including "The Lady of Shalott", "Mariana in the South", "Oenone", "The Palace of Art", "A Dream of Fair Women" and "The Lotos-Eaters"; published in December of this year, although the book states "1833" (see also Poems 1842)
- Letitia Elizabeth Landon, writing under the pen name "L.E.L." The Easter Gift
- Letitia Elizabeth Landon, writing under the pen name "L.E.L." Fisher's Drawing Room Scrap Book, 1833
- Robert Millhouse, The Destinies of Man.

=== United States ===
- William Cullen Bryant, Poems, has most of the author's significant work since 1818, with five previously unpublished poems, including "To a Fringed Gentian" and "The Song of Marion's Men"; described as "the best volume of American verse that has ever appeared" by a writer in The North American Review
- Thomas Holley Chivers, The Path of Sorrow; or, The Lament of Youth; the author's first book of poetry, written while he was studying medicine
- Sumner Lincoln Fairfield, The Last Night of Pompeii, a narrative poem about the conflicts between the Christian and pagan faiths; written in three cantos of blank verse
- William Gilmore Simms, Atalantis: A Story of the Sea, a poem about a sea-fairy saved from a demon by a Spanish knight, who is then led by her into the caves of the ocean
- Frederick William Thomas, The Emigrant, the author's first book; about the Ohio River region, influenced by William Wordsworth and Lord Byron

== Works published in other languages ==
- Théophile Gautier, Albertus, 62 poems in a wide variety of verse forms, often imitating other, more established Romantic poets such as Sainte-Beuve, Alphonse de Lamartine, and Victor Hugo; an expanded version of Poésies 1830, which contained 40 pieces composed when the author was 18 years old (since that work was published during the July Revolution, no copies were sold and it was eventually withdrawn; see also the revised edition, 1845), includes "Albertus", written in 1831, a long narrative poem of 122 alexandrine stanzas parodying macabre and supernatural Romantic tales; France
- Johann Wolfgang von Goethe, Faust, part II, Germany
- Adam Mickiewicz, Dziady, part III, Poland
- Aleksandr Pushkin's Eugene Onegin, Russia
- Frederik Paludan-Muller Fire Romancer ("Four Romances"), his first book of poems, Denmark

== Births ==
Death years link to the corresponding "[year] in poetry" article:

- January 27 – Lewis Carroll, pen name of Charles Lutwidge Dodgson (died 1898), English writer of nonsense prose and poetry
- March 17 – Joseph Skipsey (died 1903), English "pitman poet"
- May 13 – Juris Alunāns (died 1864), Latvian philologist and poet
- June 10 – Edwin Arnold (died 1904), English
- October 1 – Henry Clay Work (died 1884), American songwriter
- October 9 – Elizabeth Akers Allen (died 1911), American author, journalist and poet
- November 21 – Benjamin Paul Blood (died 1919), American philosopher and poet
- December 13 – Matsudaira Teru 松平照 also called "Teruhime" 照姫, literally translated, "Princess Teru" (died 1884), late Edo and early Meiji period Japanese aristocrat and skilled waka poet who instructed Matsudaira Katamori in poetry and calligraphy

== Deaths ==
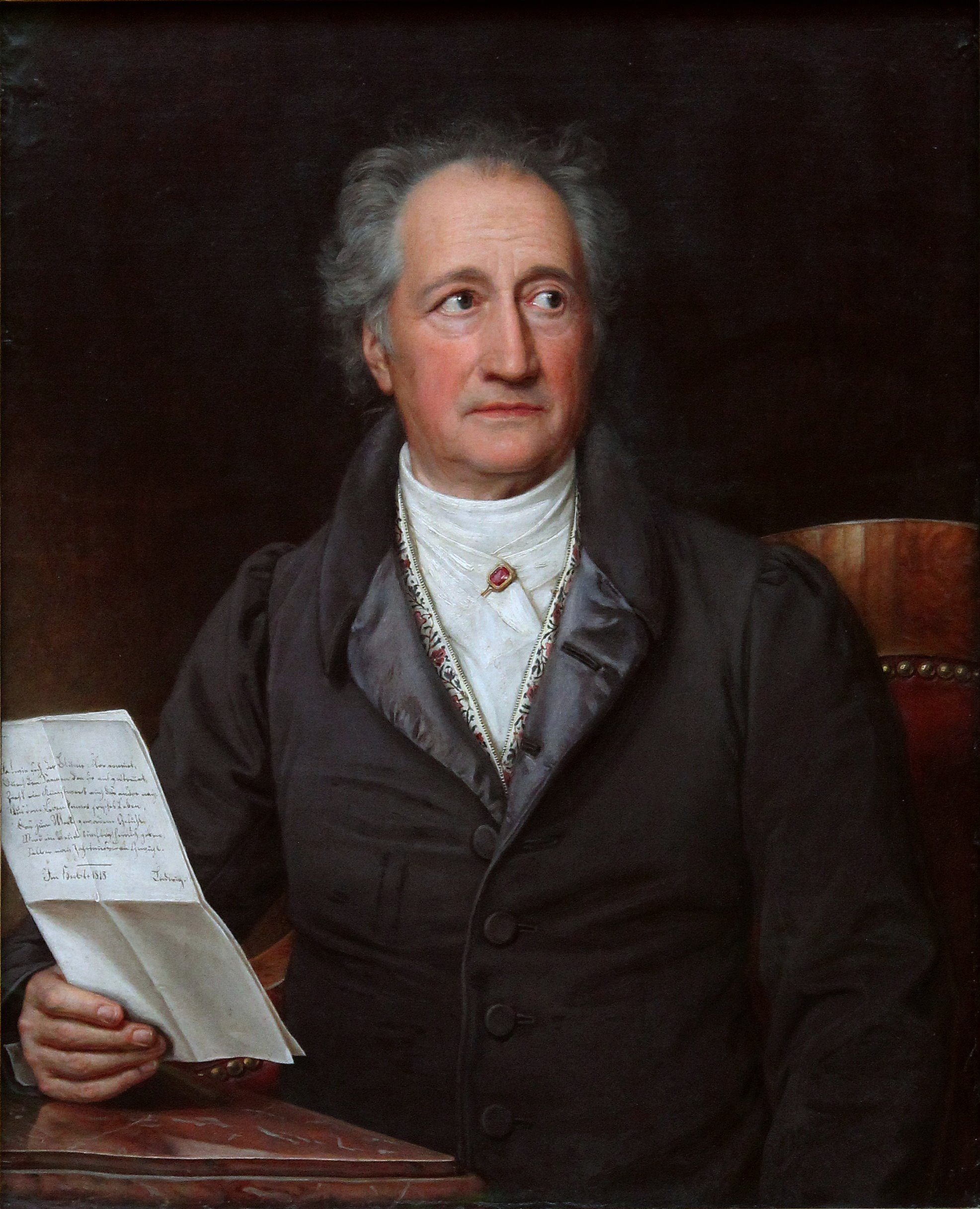
Johann Wolfgang von Goethe, who died this year, from an 1828 portrait

Birth years link to the corresponding "[year] in poetry" article:

- February 3 – George Crabbe (born 1754), English
- March 22 – Johann Wolfgang von Goethe (born 1749), German novelist, dramatist and poet
- June 21 – Anna Maria Porter (born 1780), English poet, novelist and sister of Jane Porter, typhus
- August 17 – James Bisset (born c. 1762), British artist, manufacturer, writer, collector, art dealer and poet
- September 21 – Sir Walter Scott (born 1771), Scottish poet and historical novelist
- December 17 – Robert Charles Sands (born 1799), American writer and poet
- December 18 – Philip Freneau (born 1752), American poet, nationalist, polemicist, sea captain and newspaper editor
- James Thomson (born 1763), Scottish weaver poet

== See also ==
- Poetry
- List of years in poetry
- List of years in literature
- 19th century in literature
- 19th century in poetry
- Romantic poetry
- Golden Age of Russian Poetry (1800–1850)
- Young Germany (Junges Deutschland) a loose group of German writers from about 1830 to 1850
- List of poets
