= David Robertson (bookseller) =

Scottish bookseller & publisher (1795–1854)

David Robertson (1795–1854) was a Scottish bookseller, now known for his publication of the early Whistle Binkie anthologies.

== Life ==
The son of a farmer, Robertson was born in the parish of Kippen, Perthshire. He received an education in his native district, and in 1810 was apprenticed to William Turnbull, bookseller in Trongate, Glasgow.

In 1821 appeared a pseudonymous work Three Nights in Perthshire by Percy Yorke Jr., written by Robertson's friend Thomas Atkinson. The pair had made a visit to Perthshire, the historical county: they went to the Trossachs, now in the Stirling council area, as is Kippen. The younger Atkinson, a Glaswegian, at this point was working for Brash & Reid, booksellers, where he had been an apprentice. The book is a fictionalised account of their visit to Loch Ard and the farm Ledard there, run by the Macfarlane family, who included Donald Macfarlan(e) MD of Ledard (died 1857).

On the death of Turnbull in 1823, Robertson carried on the business for seven years, in partnership with Atkinson. In 1830 the partnership was dissolved, and Robertson opened new premises in a different part of Trongate. In 1842 his portrait, painted by Sir Daniel Macnee, was publicly presented to him.

David Robertson belonged to the United Presbyterian Church, Wellington Street, Glasgow. In 1848 he provided an essay prize for "Sabbath tracts", by way of answer to the Tracts for the Times. He died of cholera on 6 October 1854, and was buried in Glasgow Necropolis, where his friends placed a memorial obelisk, with medallion portrait.

== 188 Trongate ==
Robertson's gift for story-telling, his love of Scottish poetry, and his tact and shrewdness, won him friendships and success, and his place of business became a rendezvous for local men of letters, such as William Kennedy. John Strang, one of the regulars, listed others, besides Kennedy: John Donald Carrick, Dr John Graeme (1797–1852), Andrew A. Henderson, William Motherwell, Edward Pinkerton (1798–1844), Alexander Rodger, and Dr William Young. Young was medically qualified, and had been in practice at Neilston before moving to Glasgow, where he was one of the founders, with Henderson, of the Glasgow Dilettanti Society; he died of typhus in 1838, after being appointed to the Glasgow Royal Infirmary. Others mentioned are the journalists Charles Mackay, and Lucius Verus (Thomas Davidson) of the Glasgow Free Press.

== Publisher ==
To his trade as bookseller Robertson gradually added publishing. In 1832 he published the first issue of Whistle Binkie, a collection of contemporary Scottish lyrics. This he followed up with four similar series, and in 1846 with a separate volume of Songs for the Nursery, praised by Lord Jeffrey in a letter to the publisher. The whole series was reissued in one volume in 1848, in two volumes in 1853, and again, with additions, in 1878 and 1890.

Two series of The Laird of Logan, Scottish stories narrated by Robertson himself and others, appeared in 1835 and 1837, and a complete enlarged edition, dedicated to Albert, Prince Consort, in 1841. New issues, with additions, were published in 1845 and 1854, and were often reprinted. The name was taken from the last Logan of that Ilk to be laird of the lowland branch of Clan Logan, Hugh Logan of Logan died 1802. Of Kyle, Ayrshire, he was a reputed wit, supposed to have sat on a stone, Logan's Pillar, cracking jokes.

Robertson also published William Motherwell's Poems (1832, 1847, 1849) and Andrew Henderson's collection Scottish Proverbs (1832); as well as the "Western Supplement" to Oliver and Boyd's Almanac, from 1824 onwards.

== Family ==
Robertson married in 1826 Frances Aitken, daughter of a prominent Glasgow builder. Three daughters and a son David, who succeeded to the business, survived him. Of the daughters, Helen King Robertson married in 1864 James MacGregor, after they met at the home of another daughter, Mrs. Hutchison (actually Hutcheson); Jane, the second daughter, married in 1851 John Hutcheson, Bank of Scotland agent in Paisley.
