= Ram Sharma (disambiguation) =

Ram Sharma (1837–1918) was an Indo-Anglian poet.

Ram Sharma can also refer to:

== Academics and poets ==
- Ram Avatar Sharma (1877–1929), Indian academic
- Ram Vilas Sharma (1912–2000), Indian literary critic and poet
- Ram Sharan Sharma (1919–2011), Indian historian
- Ram Karan Sharma (born 1927), Sanskrit poet

== Politicians ==
- Ram Narayan Sharma (1915–1985), Indian politician
- Sadhu Ram Sharma (born 1921), Indian politician, leader of the Indian National Congress
- Tulsi Ram Sharma (active 1948–1955), Indian politician
- Madho Ram Sharma (active 1967–1977), Indian politician, represented Karnal (Lok Sabha constituency)
- Ram Sewak Sharma (born 1955), Indian civil servant
- Ram Swaroop Sharma (born 1958), Indian politician
- Ram Kumar Sharma (active since 2014), Indian politician
- Ram Prasad Sharma (active since 2014), Indian politician

== Others ==
- Shriram Sharma, Indian social reformer, philosopher, and spiritualist
  - Pandit Shree Ram Sharma metro station
- S. Ram Sharma, Indian director of 1965 Hindi film Shaheed and the 1970 Hindi film Yaadgaar
- Ram Carlo Sharma, Philippine basketballer
