= Thomas Atkinson (poet) =

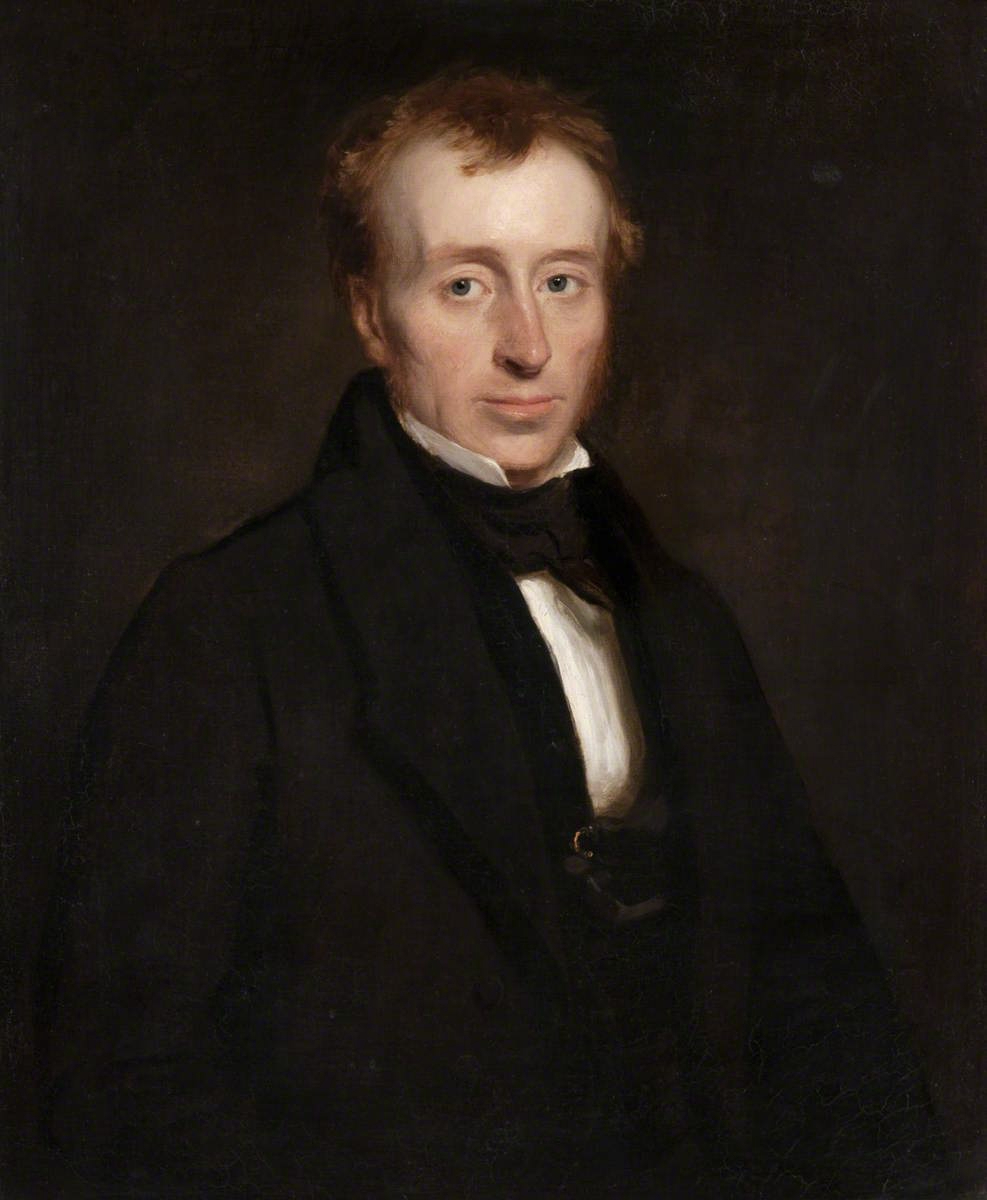
Thomas Atkinson, portrait by Andrew A. Henderson

Thomas Atkinson (1801–1833) was a Scottish poet and miscellaneous writer.

== Life ==
Atkinson was a native of Glasgow, where he carried on business as a bookseller. He followed in the shoes of his father, also Thomas Atkinson. He was apprenticed to Brash & Reid, booksellers, and continued for a time there.

From 1823 to 1830 Atkinson was in partnership with David Robertson, having taken over the business of William Turnbull on his death. Later he ran a bookshop at 80 Trongate under the name of Atkinson & Co.

After the passing of the Reform Bill, Atkins became a candidate in the liberal interest for the representation of the Stirling Burghs in parliament, but was unsuccessful, losing to Archibald Primrose, Lord Dalmeny. He then fell ill with consumption, and died at sea on a passage to Barbados, 10 October 1833.

== Works ==
In 1821 appeared the pseudonymous work Three Nights in Perthshire by Percy Yorke Jr., written by Thomas Atkinson. With his older friend David Robertson, he had made a visit to Perthshire, the historical county: they went to the Trossachs, now in the Stirling council area, as is Kippen, Robertson's native town. The book is a fictionalised account of their visit to Loch Ard and the farm Ledard there, run by the Macfarlane family. It was privately printed, and given a later edition.

Atkinson published the Sextuple Alliance (poems on Napoleon Bonaparte), dedicated to James Ewing of Levenside, a friend. A fortnightly, then weekly literary periodical, The Ant, appeared end 1826–end 1827. It had a supposed co-editor "Solomon Saveal" (see wikt:save-all). A Scottish-themed annual, The Chameleon, appeared three times from 1831.

== Legacy ==
Monies left in Atkinson's will created the Atkinson Institution in Glasgow. It was a trust for technical education, functioning in 1861. It was in existence until the Glasgow and West of Scotland Technical College was founded in 1887 when its funds were used for student bursaries.
