= 1762 in poetry =

This article covers 1762 in poetry. Nationality words link to articles with information on the nation's poetry or literature (for instance, Irish or France).

== Works published ==
=== Colonial America ===
- James Bowdoin, four poems in the anthology Harvard Verses presented to George III in an attempt to gain royal support for Harvard College
- Thomas Godfrey, "The Court of Fancy: A Poem", English, Colonial America
- Francis Hopkinson:
  - "An Exercise"
  - "Science: A Poem"
  - A Collection of Psalm Tunes

=== United Kingdom ===
- James Boswell, The Cub at Newmarket, published by James Dodsley
- Elizabeth Carter, Poems on Several Occasions
- Charles Churchill, The Ghost, Books I-III (followed by Book IV in 1763)
- Mary Collier, Poems, on Several Occasions
- John Cunningham, The Contemplatist
- Thomas Denton, The House of Superstition, prefixed to William Gilpin's Lives of the Reformers, written in imitation of Edmund Spenser
- William Falconer, The Shipwreck (revised in 1764 and 1769)
- Edward Jerningham, The Nunnery: An elegy in imitation of the Elegy in a Churchyard, an imitation of Thomas Gray
- James Macpherson, Fingal, an Ancient Epic Poem [...] Together with several other poems translated from the Galic language (see also Fragment of Ancient Poetry 1760, and Temora 1763)
- John Ogilvie, Poems on Various Subjects
- William Whitehead, A Charge to the Poets
- Edward Young, Resignation, published anonymously; first privately printed 1761

=== Other ===
- Tomás António Gonzaga, Marília de Dirceu, Portuguese
- Giulio Variboba, Ghiella e Shën Mëriis Virghiër, Arbëresh

== Births ==
Death years link to the corresponding "[year] in poetry" article:

- February 25 (bapt.) – Susanna Rowson (died 1824), English-American novelist, playwright, poet, lyricist, religious writer, stage actress and educator
- c. March or October – Thomas Russell (died 1788), English poet
- September 11 – Joanna Baillie (died 1851), Scottish poet and dramatist
- September 24 – William Lisle Bowles (died 1850), English poet and critic
- October 21 – George Colman the Younger (died 1837), English dramatist and miscellaneous writer
- October 30 – André Chénier (guillotined 1794), French poet
- November 30 – Samuel Egerton Brydges (died 1837), English bibliographer, writer, poet, genealogist and politician
- Approximate date – James Bisset (died 1832), Scottish-born artist, manufacturer, writer, collector, art dealer and poet

== Deaths ==
Birth years link to the corresponding "[year] in poetry" article:

- June 26 – Luise Gottsched (born 1713), German poet
- August 21 – Lady Mary Wortley Montagu (born 1689), English aristocrat and writer
- October 20 (bur.) – Mary Collier (born 1688), English poet and washerwoman

== See also ==
- Poetry
- List of years in poetry
