= 1837 in poetry =

Nationality words link to articles with information on the nation's poetry or literature (for instance, Irish or France).

== Events ==
- July – English "peasant poet" John Clare first enters an asylum for the insane, at High Beach in Essex.
- October – The United States Magazine and Democratic Review is established by John L. O'Sullivan, a political and literary magazine that publishes Walt Whitman, Henry David Thoreau and others.

== Works in English ==
=== United Kingdom ===
- Richard Harris Barham's Ingoldsby Legends
- Lord Byron, Dramas (poetry, despite the title)
- Eliza Cook's The Old Armchair
- Lady Mary Wortley Montagu, Letters and Works, including introductory anecdotes by Lady Louisa Stuart (See also Works 1803)
- Thomas Love Peacock's The Paper Money Lyrics
- Robert Southey, The Poetical Works of Robert Southey, first two volumes published this year; second two volumes published in 1838
- Letitia Elizabeth Landon, writing under the pen name "L.E.L." Fisher's Drawing Room Scrap Book, 1838

=== United States ===
- Thomas Holley Chivers, Nacoochee
- George Moses Horton's Hope of Liberty — Poems by a Slave, a second edition of Hope of Liberty, originally published in 1829; the new edition was published in Philadelphia by an antislavery group; Horton received no royalties (although the North Carolina slave was trying to earn money for his freedom), and likely didn't even know that this and another edition had been published in Boston in 1838); contains 23 poems, including three on the author's feelings about having been a slave;
- Frederick William Shelton, The Trollopiad; or, Travelling Gentlemen in America, a verse satire on British travel writer Frances Trollope, who wrote harshly about Americans in her Domestic Manners of the Americans 1832
- John Greenleaf Whittier, Poems Written During the Progress of the Abolition Question in the United States, the author's first poetry book, published in an unauthorized edition by Boston abolitionists; the next year, Whittier expanded the collection and published it under the title Poems; includes poems attacking slavery, such as "Clerical Oppressors", which focuses on Southern church leaders who use Christianity to defend slavery, and "Stanzas", on the irony of America's commitments to both freedom and slavery

== Works published in other languages ==
- Victor Hugo, Les Voix intérieures, France
- José de Espronceda, El estudiante de Salamanca, first fragment, Spain
- Alphonse de Lamartine's Chute d'un ange, France
- Charles-Augustin Sainte-Beuve, Les Pensées d'août, France

== Births ==
Death years link to the corresponding "[year] in poetry" article:

- January 30 – Augusta Webster, born Julia Augusta Davies (died 1894), English
- February 24 – Rosalía de Castro (died 1885), Spanish Galician poet and writer
- March 1 – William Dean Howells (died 1920), American writer, editor and critic
- March 18 – Eliza A. Pittsinger (died 1908), American, "The California Poetess"
- April 1 – Jorge Isaacs, born Jorge Isaacs Ferrer (died 1895), Colombian writer, politician and explorer
- April 5 – Algernon Charles Swinburne (died 1909), English
- April 10 – Forceythe Willson, born Byron Forceythe Willson (died 1867), American
- July 14 – Estella Hijmans-Hertzveld (died 1881), Dutch
- September 8 – Joaquin Miller, born Cincinnatus Heine Miller (died 1913), American "Poet of the Sierras"
- Undated – Ram Sharma (died 1918), Indian, English-language poet and journalist

== Deaths ==
Birth years link to the corresponding "[year] in poetry" article:

- January 29 – Alexander Pushkin (born 1799), Russian poet, killed in a duel
- June 14 – Giacomo Leopardi (born 1798), Italian poet, philosopher, essayist and philologist
- March 15 – Lukijan Mušicki (born 1777), Serbian poet, prose writer and polyglot
- September 8 – Sir Samuel Egerton Brydges (born 1762), English
- October 17 – George Colman the Younger (born 1762), English dramatist and miscellaneous writer
- October 19 – Hendrik Doeff (born 1764), Dutch trader, the first westerner to write haiku in Japanese
- November 11 – Thomas Green Fessenden (born 1771), American

== See also ==
- 19th century in poetry
- 19th century in literature
- List of years in poetry
- List of years in literature
- Victorian literature
- French literature of the 19th century
- Biedermeier era of German literature
- Golden Age of Russian Poetry (1800–1850)
- Young Germany (Junges Deutschland) a loose group of German writers from about 1830 to 1850
- List of poets
- Poetry
- List of poetry awards
