= Frédéric Thomas =

Frédéric Thomas may refer to:

- Frédéric Thomas (footballer) (born 1980), French footballer
- Frédéric Thomas (playwright) (1814–1884), French politician and playwright

== See also ==
- Frederick Thomas (disambiguation)
