= On Quitting School =

Sonnet written by Samuel Taylor Coleridge

"On Quitting School" is a sonnet written by Samuel Taylor Coleridge in 1791. It describes Coleridge's feelings of leaving school for Cambridge in an optimistic manner quite contrary to the views he expressed later in life.

== Background ==
Coleridge attended Christ's Hospital for his pre-college education and completed many poetic exercises there. During his final year, he wrote "On Quitting School for College" for an exercise. He included his feelings about his school years, his future at college, and his childhood home at Ottery. It was completed during the summer of 1791 (see 1791 in poetry) and included in the Ottery Copy Book, a manuscript containing poetry from Coleridge's early years. The poem was eventually published in the 1834 edition of Coleridge's poems (see 1834 in poetry). Another poem titled "Absence: A Farewell Ode on Quitting School for Jesus College, Cambridge", and Coleridge stated that he wrote it during 1791. It was published in the Sherborne Weekly Entertainer during the summer of 1793 and again in the October 1794 Cambridge Intelligencer. The tone of the later edition is serious, whereas a possible 1792 version in a letter could be a parody.

== Poem ==
"On Quitting School" is a sonnet dedicated to saying goodbye to Christ's Hospital and Ottery:

Farewell parental scenes! a sad farewell!
To you my grateful heart still fondly clings,
Tho' fluttering round on Fancy's burnish'd wings
Her tales of future Joy Hope loves to tell.
Adieu, adieu! ye much-lov'd cloisters pale!

— lines 1–5

There is a tone of regret within the poem:

Ah! would those happy days return again,
When 'neath your arches, free from every stain,
I heard of guilt and wonder'd at the tale!

— lines 6–8

=== Absence ===
Like "On Quitting School", "Absence" deals with saying farewell to a time, although it is uncertain what specific event or subject he was remembering. The subtitle "A Farewell Ode on Quitting School for Jesus College, Cambridge" is a variation of the poem alters the meaning of the poem. The poem begins with a respectful description of the narrator's education:

Where graced with many a classic spoil
Cam rolls his reverened stream along,
I haste to urge the learnéd toil
That sternly chides my love-lorn song:

— lines 1–4

Like "On Quitting School", there is also a tone of regret:

Ah me! too mindful of the days
Illumed by Passion's orient rays,
When Peace, and Cheerfullness and Health
Enriched me with the best of wealth.
Ah fair Delights! that o'er my soul
On Memory's wing, like shadows fly!
Ah Flowers! which Joy from Eden stole
While Innocence stood smiling by!—

— lines 5-12

It is possible that the 1792 poem, "A Fragment Found in a Lecture Room", is a parody and makes fun of his education (called Mathesis) as the first four lines of this poem read:

Where deep in mud Cam rolls his slumbrous stream,
And bog and desolation reign supreme;
Where all Boeotia clouds the misty brain,
The owl Mathesis pipes her loathsome strain.

— lines 1–4

== Themes ==
The terms that Coleridge uses to describe his time at Ottery and at school are more positive than his real feelings. Years later, he would recall bad experiences from his school days and include negative descriptions of the time in poems such as "Frost at Midnight". The final years at Christ's Hospital were filled with pain and suffering, as Coleridge lost both a brother and a sister at the time, and these emotions come out in the poetry during that time. Richard Holmes, Coleridge's late 20th-century biographer, wrote, "Perhaps this also explains the intense emotion with which he finally left Christ's Hospital that summer, celebrated in his 'Sonnet:On Quitting School for College' [...] He bid 'Adieu, adieu! to the 'much-lov'd cloisters pale!', and spoke in tears of his happy days there". Similarly, the later poem on saying goodbye to Christ's Hospital, "Absence", is a serious, but it is possible that an early version of the poem was a parody.

The tone and language of the poem is influenced by William Bowles's poetry; it differs from 18th-century poetic conventions and connects the style of the poem to many of Coleridge's other poems of the time, including "To the Autumnal Moon", "Pain", "On Receiving an Account that his only Sister's Death was Inevitable" and "To the River Otter". Also, Coleridge uses the word "ah" in a regretful manner which is common to many of his poems, including "On Receiving an Account", "Absence" and "To the River Otter".
