= Alexander Laing (Scottish poet) =

Scottish verse writer

Alexander Laing (1787–1857) was a Scottish verse writer, known as the Brechin poet.

== Life ==
Laing was born at Brechin, Angus, 14 May 1787; his father was an agricultural labourer. Laing spent only two winters at school, and when eight years old became a herdsman. At the age 16 he was apprenticed to a flax-dresser, and followed this occupation for fourteen years, when an accident permanently disabled him.

Laing afterwards earned a living as a pedlar, and died at Brechin, 14 October 1857.

== Works ==
Laing wrote in Lallans, and contributed to local newspapers and to the following poetical miscellanies:

- The Harp of Renfrewshire, 1819;
- John Struthers's The Harp of Caledonia, 1819;
- Robert Archibald Smith's The Scotish Minstrel, 1820;
- Alexander Whitelaw's Book of Scottish Song, 1844; and
- Whistle Binkie, 1832–47.

Laing also furnished anecdotes to the Scottish story-book The Laird of Logan, 1835. In 1846 he published a collection of his poetry under the title Wayside Flowers, of which a second edition appeared in 1850. He edited popular editions of Robert Burns and Robert Tannahill, supplied notes to Allan Cunningham's Scottish Songs, 1825, and biographical notices to the Angus Album, 1833.

== Notes ==
Attribution

This article incorporates text from a publication now in the public domain: Lee, Sidney, ed. (1892). "Laing, Alexander (1787-1857)". Dictionary of National Biography. Vol. 31. London: Smith, Elder & Co.
