= James MacGregor (moderator) =

Scottish minister and philanthropist

James MacGregor FRSE
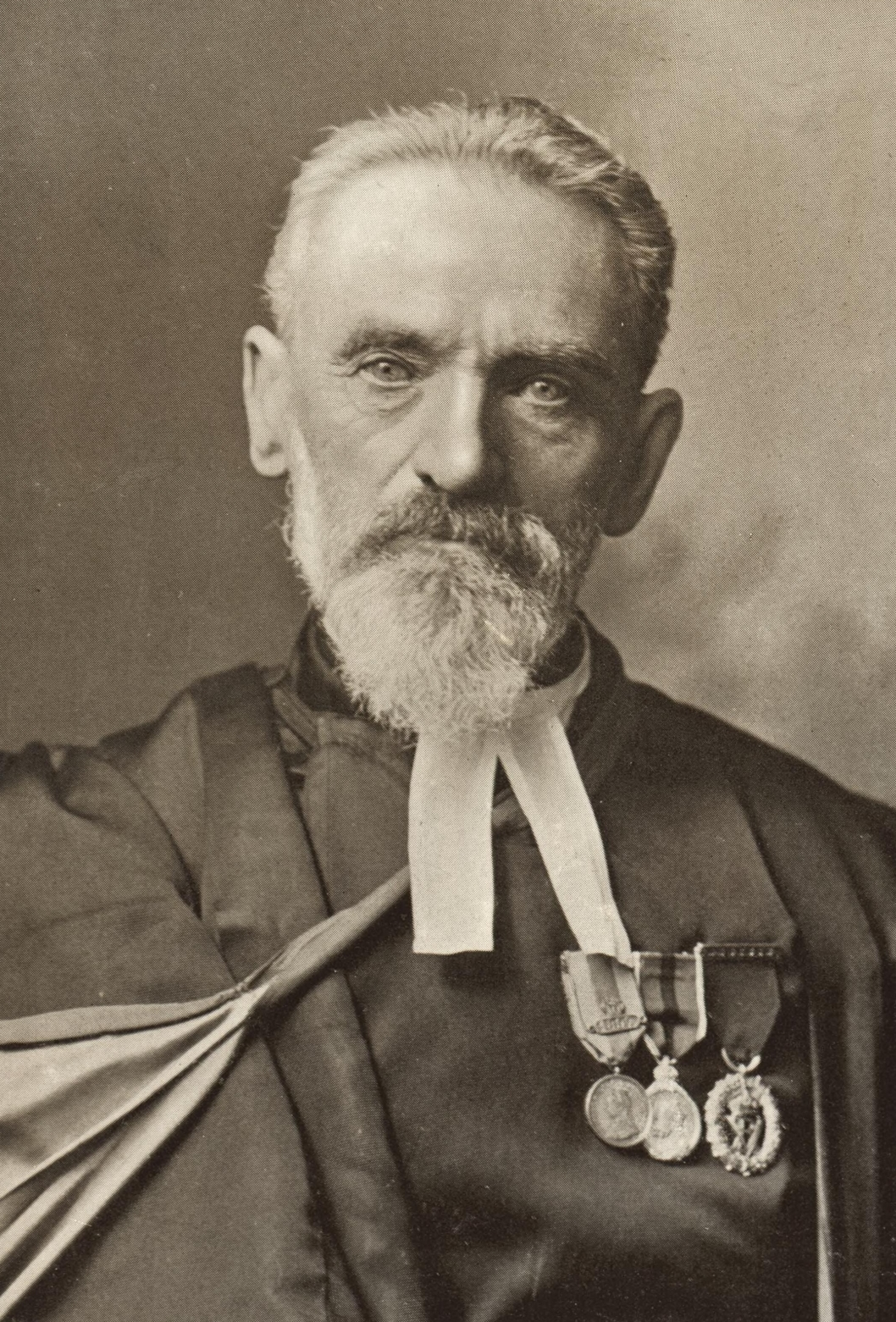
- Born: 1832; Brownhill Farm, Perthshire, Scotland
- Died: 1910 (aged 77–78)
- Occupation: minister

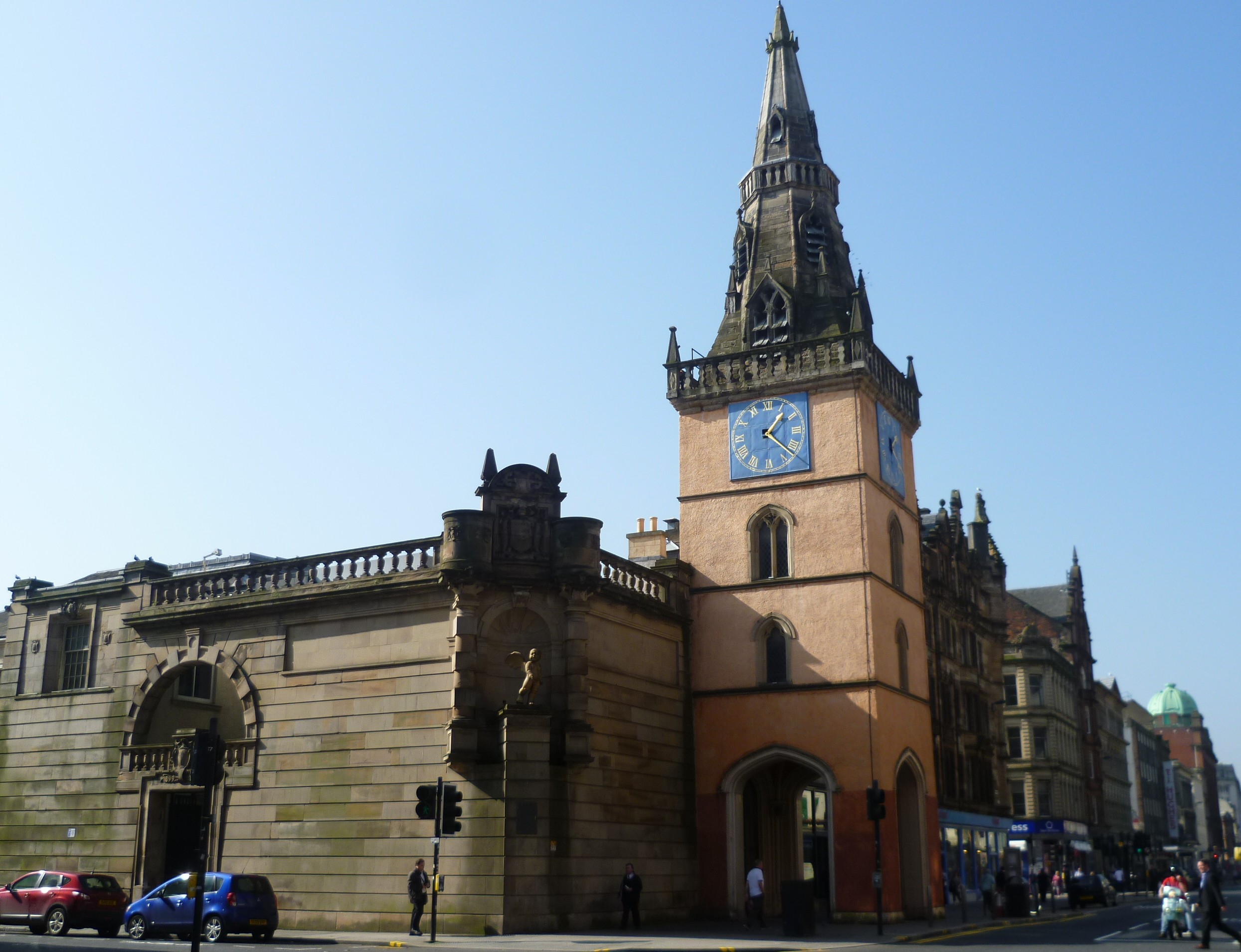
Tron Church, Glasgow

James MacGregor FRSE (1832–1910) was a Scottish minister and philanthropist. He was Moderator of the General Assembly of the Church of Scotland in 1891. In 1886 he was made Chaplain in Ordinary to Queen Victoria, in 1901 Chaplain to King Edward VII, and in 1910 to King George V, serving three monarchs in all.

== Life ==
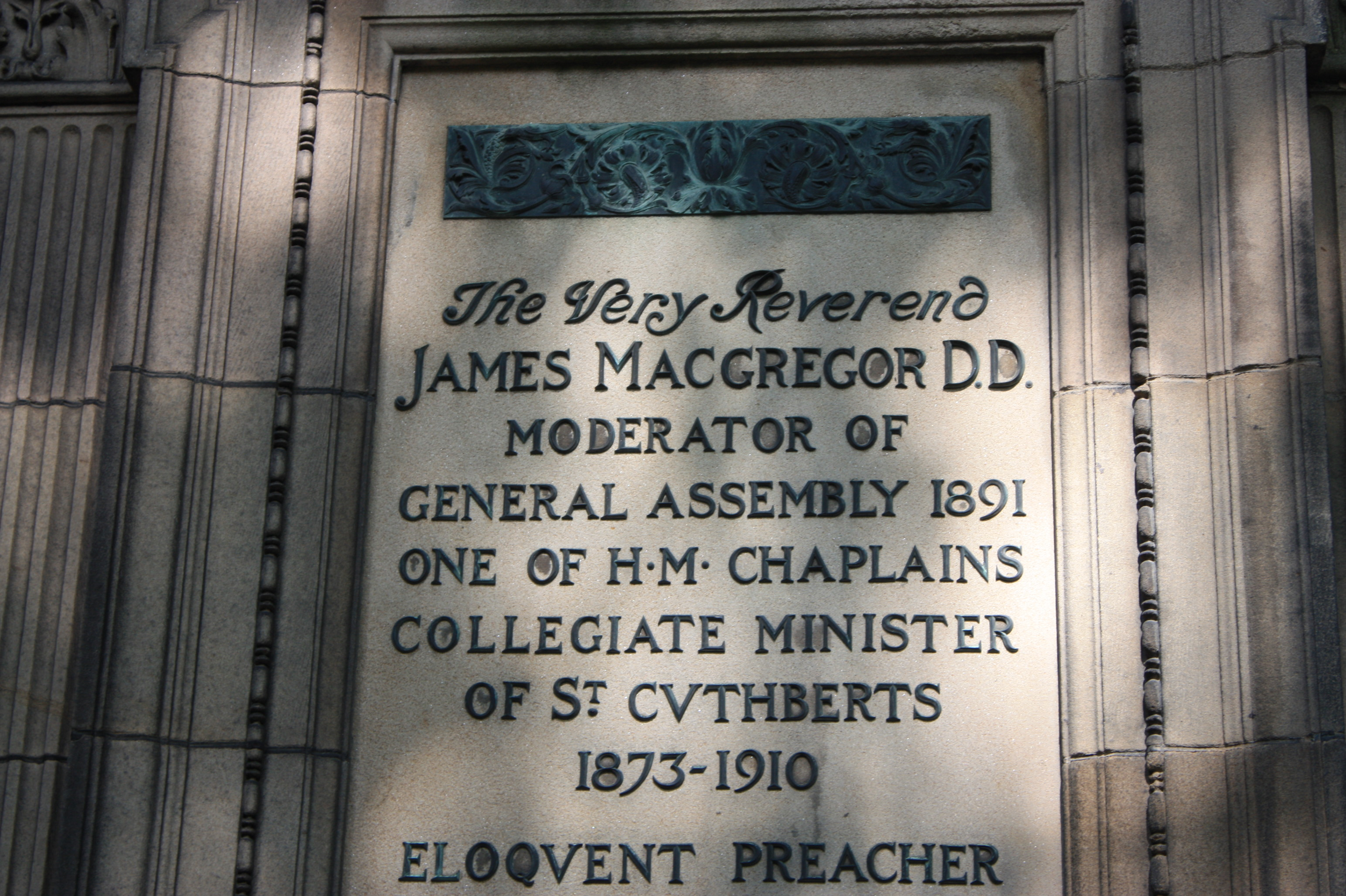
Memorial tablet to James MacGregor, St Cuthberts, Edinburgh

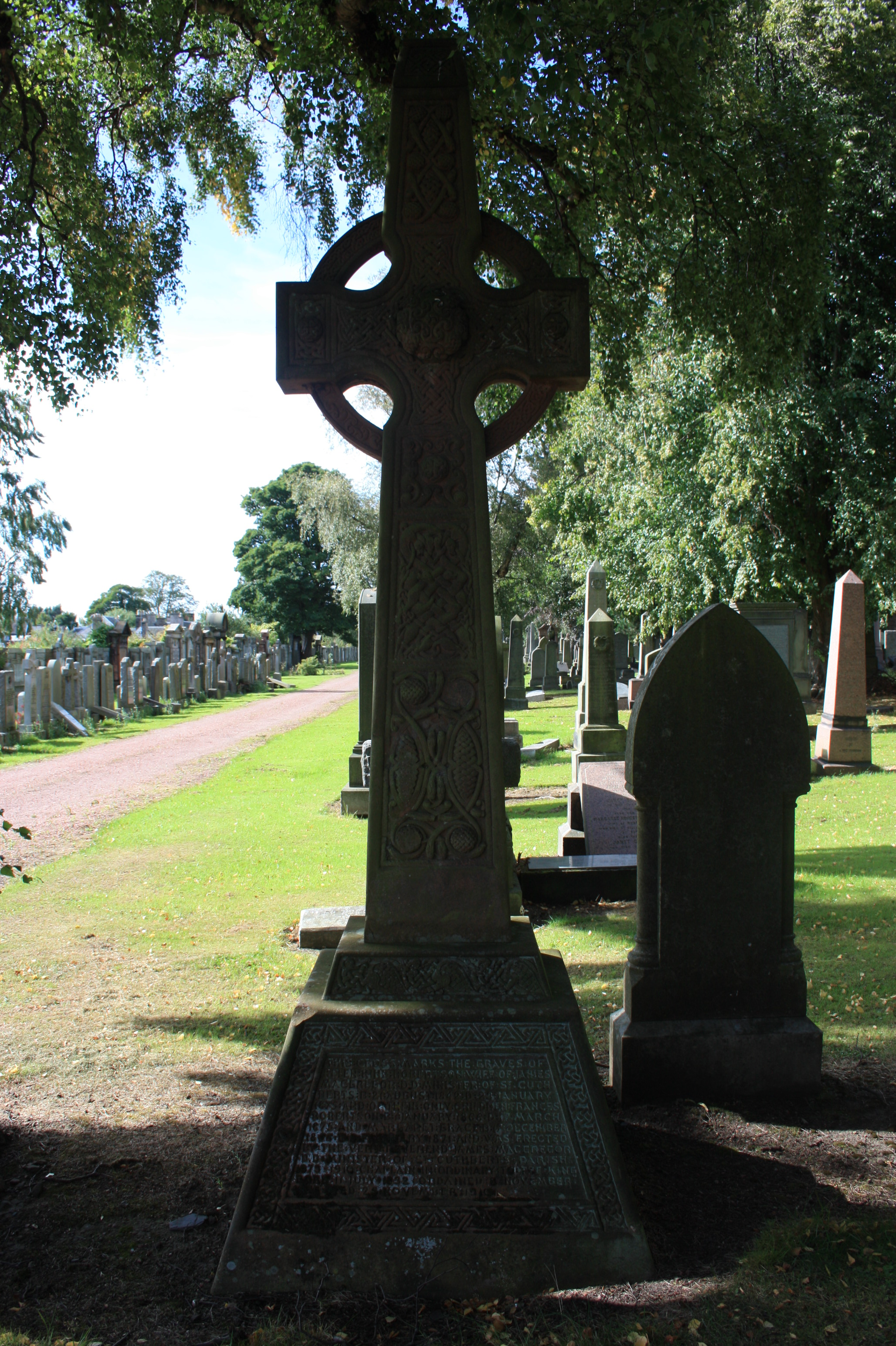
The grave of Very Rev James MacGregor, Grange Cemetery, Edinburgh

He was born on 11 July 1832 at Brownhill Farm near Scone, Perthshire, the son of James MacGregor, farmer, and his wife, Margaret MacDougall. He was educated at Scone Parish School, then Perth Academy. He then studied divinity at St Andrews University 1848 to 1855.

He was licensed to preach by the Presbytery of Perth in May 1855 and then served in a series of illustrious churches: Paisley High Church (1855-1862); Monimail Church in Fife (1862-1864), Tron Church in Glasgow (1864-1868); Tron Kirk in Edinburgh (1868-1873); and finally St Cuthbert's Church, Edinburgh (1873-1910). During his ministry of St Cuthberts, he oversaw the total reconstruction of the church from 1888 to 1894, under the design of Edinburgh architect Hippolyte Blanc.

In Glasgow he lived at 7 Clayton Place in the Dennistoun district.

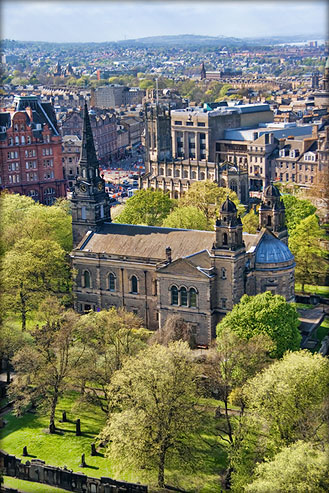
A view of St. Cuthbert's from the Northwest wall of Edinburgh Castle

St Andrews University awarded him an honorary doctorate (DD) in 1870. In 1876 he was made the official Chaplain to the Royal Scottish Academy. In 1886 he was elected a fellow of the Royal Society of Edinburgh. His proposers were Robert Flint, James Sanderson, Peter Guthrie Tait and Alexander Buchan. In 1892 he was appointed Honorary Chaplain (Pontifex Maximus) of the Harveian Society of Edinburgh.

In 1890 he was living at 11 Cumin Place in the Grange district of south Edinburgh.

He travelled widely, with trips to China, Canada with the Marquis of Lome to inspect the progress of the Canadian Pacific Railway. In 1889 he represented Scotland in Australia's jubilee celebration of the Presbyterian Church.

He died at home 3 Eton Terrace in the Learmonth district of Edinburgh on 25 November 1910. He is buried with his first wife and children in Grange Cemetery on the south side of the city. The grave stands on the extreme south-east corner of the south-east section.

== Recognition ==
The town of MacGregor, Manitoba, was named after him during his Canadian visit.

He was painted by both Otto Leyde and George Reid RSA. John Bowie ARSA painted him as part of a group entitled “The Queen’s Chaplains”.

== Family ==
He married twice.

In August 1864, he married Helen King Robertson (1842–1875), daughter of David Robertson, a Glasgow publisher. Their two daughters died in infancy. In September 1892 he married Helen Murray, daughter of Charles Murray of Perth. Helen died in 1930 and was buried with James in Grange Cemetery.

== Publications ==
Resources by this author at your library

- The Sabbath Question (1866)
- Memoirs of the late Rev Henry M. Douglas (1867)
- The Epistle of Paul to the Churches of Galatia (1881)
- Old Scottish Communion Plate (1892)
- Studies in the History of Christian Apologetics (1892)
