= Robert Archibald Smith =

Scottish musical Ronantic composer

Robert Archibald Smith (1780–1829) was a Scottish musical Romantic composer, known for his collection Scotish [sic] Minstrel, which began to appear in 1821.

== Life ==
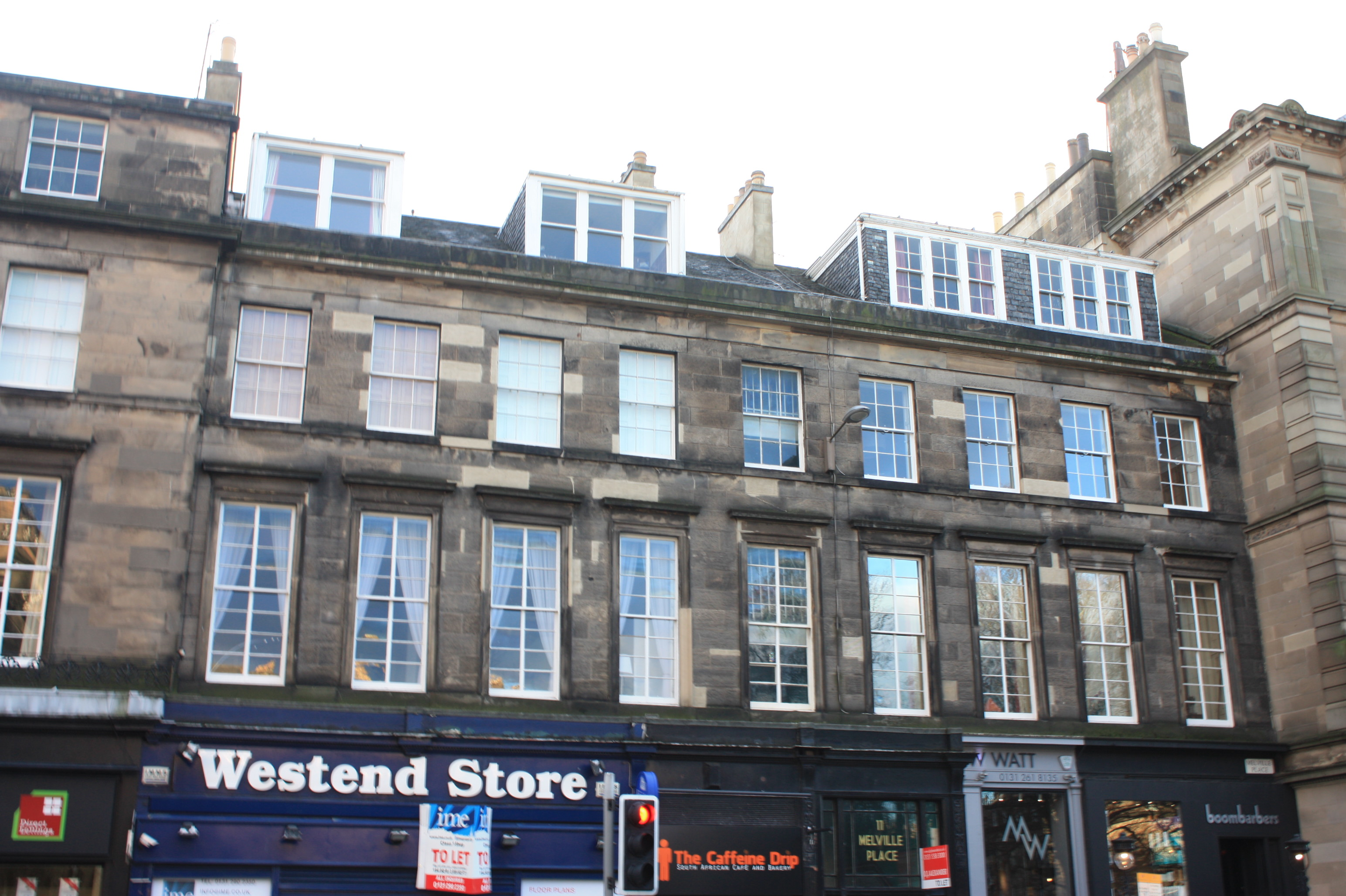
Smith lived in a flat at 11 Melville Place, Edinburgh

He was born on 16 November 1780.

He was the son of Robert Smith, a silk-weaver from East Kilbride who had moved to England, and was born at Reading, Berkshire on 16 November 1780; his mother was Ann Whitcher. He was apprenticed in silk-weaving, joined a church choir in Reading, and played in the band of a volunteer regiment. In 1800 the family moved to Paisley in Renfrewshire where father and son became muslin weavers. Here he also became acquainted with Robert Tannahill with whom he began composing tunes to match his words.

Smith joined a volunteer company, played in its band, and composed its marches and quick-steps. Becoming a teacher of music, he was in 1807 appointed leader of psalmody in Paisley Abbey. Robert Boog, the incumbent of the parish, introduced him to Walter Young, minister of Erskine, Renfrewshire, who helped him on harmony. In 1817 he conducted his first public performance of sacred music in the Abbey.

In August 1823 Smith was appointed musical conductor (pre-cantor) in St. George's Church, Edinburgh, where the minister was Andrew Mitchell Thomson. Employed in teaching, composing, and editing, his health failed, and he died at home, a flat at 11 Melville Place, near Dean Bridge in Edinburgh on 3 January 1829.

He is buried in St Cuthbert's churchyard at the west end of Princes Street. The grave is marked by a small obelisk.

== Works ==
In Devotional Music, original and selected (1810), 24 of the numbers are Smith's. His setting of his friend Robert Tannahill's songs, especially Jessie, the Flow'r o' Dumblane (1816), made his reputation. His Scotish Minstrel, a selection from the vocal melodies of Scotland ancient and modern, was published in six volumes, 1821–4, and reached a third edition, 1838–43; many of the anonymous melodies in it have been attributed to him. Songs by Tannahill, and others set by Smith, first appeared in this work. Other contributors included Robert Allan, Alexander Laing and John Ross. The Irish Minstrel, with similar scope, appeared in one volume in 1825.

In 1826 Smith published a practical manual, Introduction to Singing. A first volume of Smith's uncompleted Select Melodies, with appropriate Words, chiefly original, selected and arranged, with Symphonies and Accompaniments for the Pianoforte, appeared in 1827. Pieces by contemporary lyrists were anonymously set by Smith, including William Motherwell's Midnight Wind. His other works were:

- Sacred Music for the Use of St. George's, Edinburgh.
- The Sacred Harmony of the Church of Scotland (1820).
- Sacred Music, consisting of Tunes, Sanctuses, etc., sung in St. George's Church (1825; other editions, 1830?, 1856, and 1867).
- Anthems for George Heriot's Day.

His setting of the anthem How beautiful upon the mountains was often reprinted.

== Family ==
Smith married, in 1802, Mary MacNicol, of Arran, who survived him with five children.

== Notes ==
Attribution

This article incorporates text from a publication now in the public domain: Lee, Sidney, ed. (1898). "Smith, Robert Archibald". Dictionary of National Biography. Vol. 53. London: Smith, Elder & Co.
