= Robert Allan (poet) =

Scottish poet

Robert Allan (4 November 1774 – 1 June 1841) was a Scottish poet.

== Biography ==
Allan was born at Kilbarchan, Renfrewshire, where his father was a flax-dresser. He, himself, would later become a muslin-weaver. Early in life he began to write songs, chiefly in the Scottish dialect. He would often composing them while working at his loom. He received the praise of Tannahill, who, like himself, was a Renfrewshire weaver and songwriter. As time progressed, Robert Archibald Smith set to music many of his Scotch songs and published them in the Scottish Minstrel in 1820. A number of them additionally appeared in the Harp of Renfrewshire. A volume of Allan's poems was also printed by subscription in 1836.

Allan reared a large family, and was poor, old, and discontented, when, in opposition to the advice of his friends, he sailed for the United States, where his youngest son was a portrait-painter of promise. He died in New York City on 1 June 1841, six days after landing. Allan's Scotch lyrics are melodious and of a melancholy nature. The best received of his works was the Covenanter's Lament.
