= Freddie Thomas (cricketer) =

Scottish cricketer

Personal information
- Full name: Frederick Oswald Thomas
- Born: 19 November 1917; Corstorphine, Midlothian, Scotland
- Died: 20 February 2003 (aged 85); Edinburgh, Midlothian, Scotland
- Batting: Right-handed
- Bowling: Right-arm medium

International information
- National side: Scotland

Domestic team information
- Years: Team
- 1947: Cambridgeshire

Career statistics
Competition	FC
Matches	1
Runs scored	21
Batting average	10.50
100s/50s	–/–
Top score	21
Balls bowled	–
Wickets	–
Bowling average	–
5 wickets in innings	–
10 wickets in match	–
Best bowling	–
Catches/stumpings	–/–
- Source: Cricinfo, 20 July 2010

Frederick Oswald Thomas (19 November 1917 – 20 February 2003) was a Scottish cricketer. Thomas was a right-handed batsman who bowled right-arm medium pace. He was born at Corstorphine, Midlothian.

In 1947, Thomas made a single Minor Counties Championship appearance for Cambridgeshire against Norfolk.

Thomas also played a single first-class match for Scotland against Worcestershire in 1951. In his only first-class match, he scored 21 runs at a batting average of 10.50, with a high score of 21.

Thomas died at Edinburgh, Midlothian on 20 February 2003.
