= Caroline Fry =

British Christian writer (1787–1846)

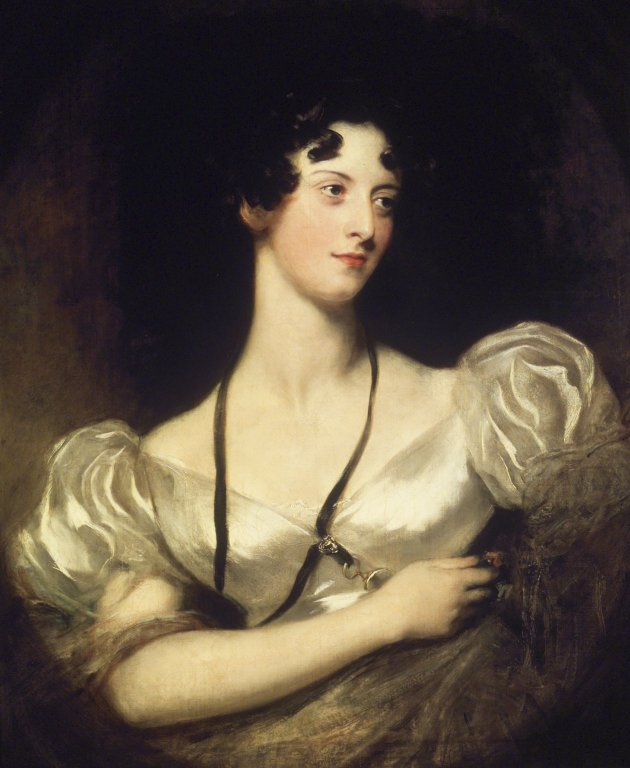
- Portrait of Miss Caroline Fry by Sir Thomas Lawrence
- Born: 31 December 1787
- Died: 17 September 1846 (aged 58)
- Spouse: William Wilson

Caroline Fry (31 December 1787 – 17 September 1846), a British Christian writer, later Mrs Caroline Wilson, was born and died at Tunbridge Wells in Kent.

== Life ==
She was one of ten children born to John and Jane Fry. She married William Wilson at Desford, Leicestershire on 26 May 1831.

Fry's family was affiliated with the "High Church" in the Church of England. Her brother John Fry (1775 – 1849) attended Oxford University and later became rector of Desford parish. He also wrote a number of Christian books. He was instrumental in educating his sister in theological matters emphasizing an evangelical faith that influenced Caroline and others of her family to abandon their "high-and-dry" religious convictions for a more fervent evangelical piety. Caroline Fry's conversion experience as a young adult in 1822 is recorded in her Autobiography, as inserted as an introduction to her book entitled, Christ Our Example. Fry has produced an impressive list of publications over her life as listed below. She began her professional writing career in 1823 by writing a monthly periodical called the Assistant of Education, Religious and Literary, which she intended for the education of children. In addition to writing church theology, she wrote devotional meditations, prayers, poetry and recounted moral lessons one might learn from the life stories of people she encountered in her travels throughout the English countryside published in two volumes entitled, The Listener.

Fry can rightfully be considered a church theologian, a writer, a poet and a Christian educator—someone who wrote from a staunch Reformed perspective on a variety of theological issues. In her book, The Listener in Oxford she describes herself as someone predestined to arrive "at the very birth-time" of conflict. Her anguish was due to the major theological differences creating strife between the newly formed Tractarian movement led by John Henry Newman, John Keble and Edward Bouverie Pusey and the existing parties of the Church of England. Her description of the Oxford lectures give readers a unique insight as to what impact the Anglo-Catholic movement was having upon the Church during a difficult time of transition, especially in her book entitled, The Table of the Lord, addressing divisive issues held by opposing parties in regard to the theology of the sacraments.

Sir Thomas Lawrence painted a famous portrait of her in 1827.

== Some of her published writings ==
- The Assistant of Education: religious and literary. Intended for the use of young persons from ten to sixteen years of age (periodical)
- An Autobiography; letters and remains of the author of the "Listener," etc
- Christ our Example (still available secondhand and possibly new)
- Christ our Law
- Daily readings : passages of scripture selected for social reading, with applications
- Death, and other poems
- Gatherings; a collection of short pieces
- The Gospel of the Old Testament : an explanation of the types and figures by which Christ was exhibited under the legal dispensation / rewritten from the original work of Samuel Mather
- The Great Commandment
- The Listener (still readily available secondhand)
- The Listener in Oxford
- Narrative of Poll Peg, of Leicestershire
- Peggy Lum, or, A hint to the purchasers of smuggled goods

(the two previous items are from The Assistant of Education)

- A Poetical Catechism; or, sacred poetry for the use of young persons
- Prayers
- Scripture principles of education
- The Scripture Reader's Guide to the devotional use of the Holy Scriptures
- Seek to be like the Saviour
- Serious poetry (available online as an e-text at University of California, Davis)
- Sunday Afternoons at Home
- The Table of the Lord
- A word to women, The love of the world, and other gatherings
- The Dog of St. Bernard's
