= Charles Morris (poet) =

British poet

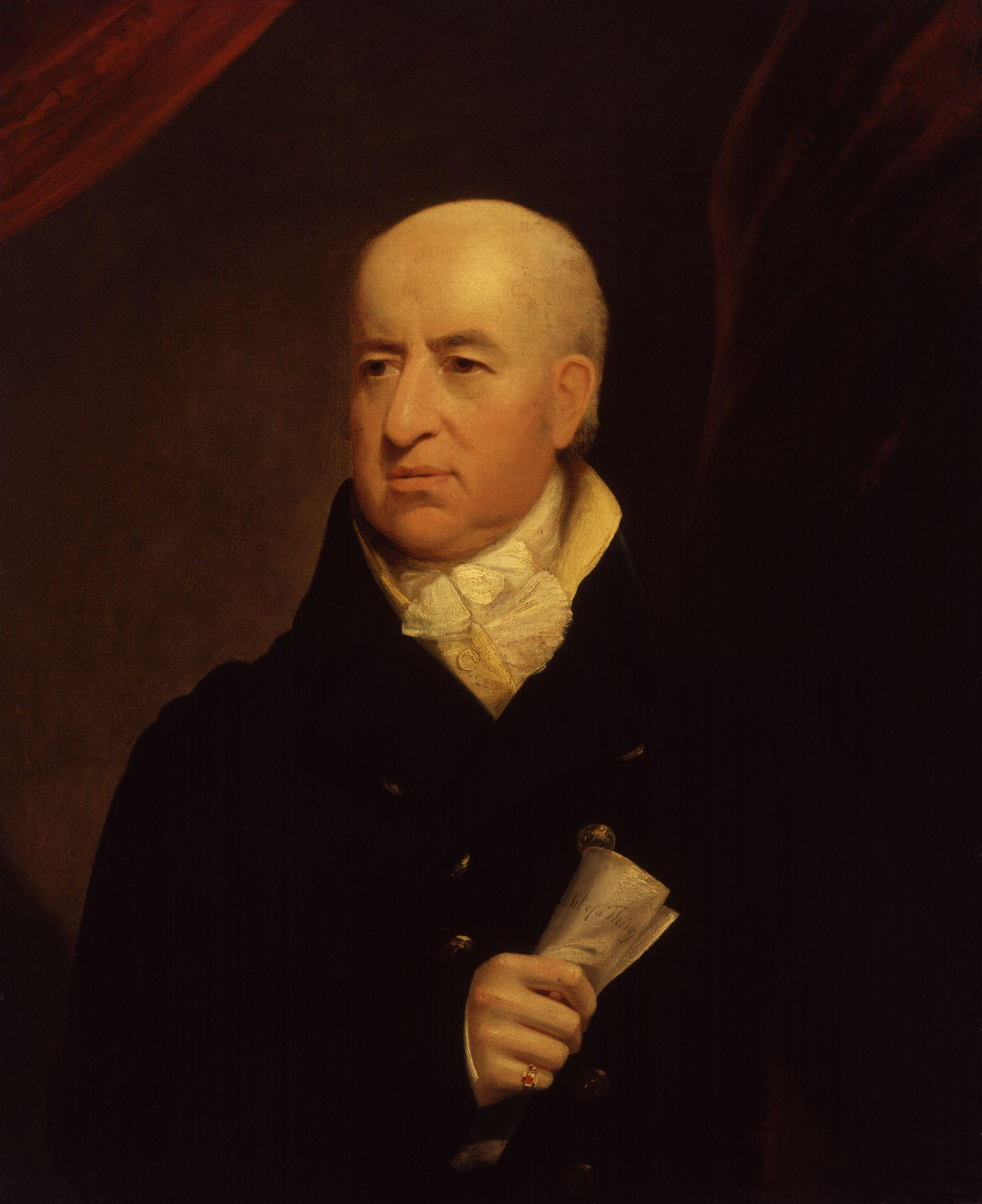
Charles Morris, by James Lonsdale (died 1839), given to the National Portrait Gallery, London

Charles Morris (c. 1745 – 11 July 1838) was a British poet.

He was possibly born near Cork, Ireland, the son of Captain Thomas Morris, whose family was of Welsh extraction. Thomas Morris had served in the 17th Foot regiment, as had his father (who commanded it under the Duke of Marlborough during the War of the Spanish Succession). Morris senior is generally credited as being the author of the song, Kitty Crowder. In 1764 Charles Morris gained an ensigncy in the regiment and was later promoted to captain whilst serving in America. After he returned to Ireland, he transferred to the Royal Irish Dragoons and His Majesty's Life Guards as he wanted to live in London.

On 14 February 1785 Morris became punch-maker and bard of the Sublime Society of Beef Steaks, a famous society limited to 24 members. He held the position until 1831.

He performed after Club dinners at Covent Garden Theatre. Politically he was a Whig associated with Charles James Fox.

On 8 February 1773 he married the widow of Sir William Stanhope (a son of Lord Chesterfield), Anne Hussey Delaval (1737-1812).

His older brother was Captain Thomas Morris (1732?-1808), who served in the British Army in America, and was himself a noted writer in his day.

Charles Morris died at Brockham Lodge, near Dorking in Surrey, a home given to him by his patron the Duke of Norfolk. He was in his 93rd year.

In 1840 a collection of his poetry, which he had assembled himself, was published as Lyrica Urbanica (or The Social Effusions of the Celebrated Captain Charles Morris of the Late Lifeguards) in two volumes.
