= 1799 in poetry =

Nationality words link to articles with information on the nation's poetry or literature (for instance, Irish or France).

== Events ==
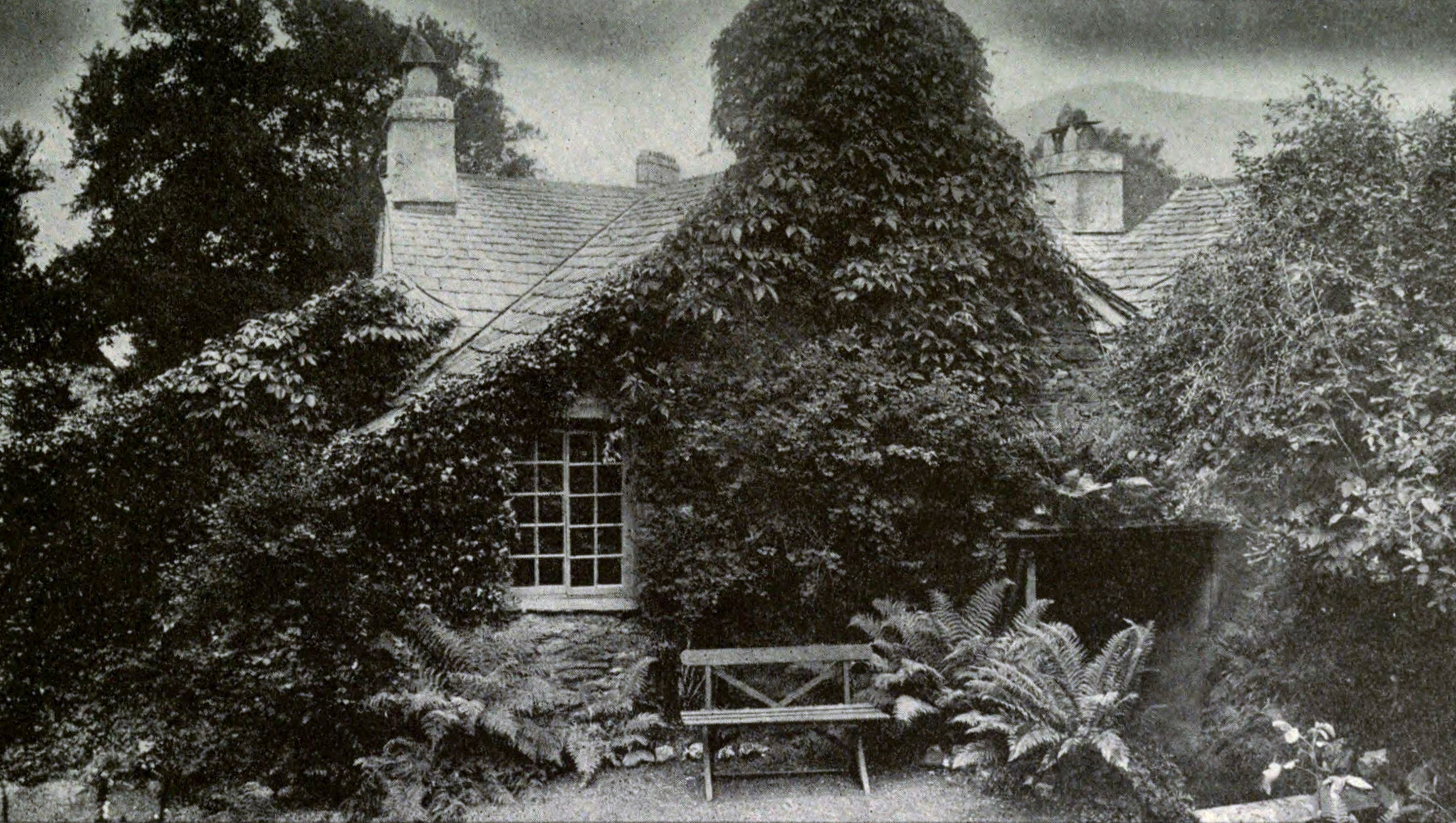
Dove Cottage, photographed c.1920

- August 1 – British Rear-Admiral Horatio Nelson's defeat of the French fleet in the Battle of the Nile is the subject of separate poems this year by English poets William Lisle Bowles and William Sotheby.
- December 20 – William Wordsworth and his sister Dorothy first take up residence at Dove Cottage, Grasmere.
- William Wordsworth completes the first version of The Prelude, begun in 1798. This version, in two parts, describes the growth of his understanding up to age 17, when he leaves home for the University of Cambridge. He will revise the poem more than once during his lifetime but not publish it. Months after his death in 1850 it will be published for the first time in its final version.
- The Monthly Magazine and American Review starts publication in the United States; edited by Charles Brockden Brown, featuring articles on current events and science, poems, short stories, essays and book reviews; converted into American Review and Literary Journal in 1801, when it becomes a quarterly.

== Works published in English ==
=== United Kingdom ===
- Mary Alcock, Poems
- William Lisle Bowles, Song of the Battle of the Nile, about Nelson's defeat of the French fleet in the Battle of the Nile on August 1, 1798
- Thomas Campbell, The Pleasures of Hope, with Other Poems
- George Huddesford, published anonymously:
  - Bubble and Squeak
  - Crumbe Repetita, sequel to Bubble and Squeak
- M. G. Lewis, editor and contributor, Tales of Terror, imitations, translations and other poems; poets included: Walter Scott, Robert Southey, John Leyden (see also Sir Walter Scott, An Apology for Tales of Terror below)
- Sir Walter Scott:
  - Translated from the German of Johann von Goethe, Goetz of Berlichingen; with The Iron Hand
  - Anonymously published, An Apology for Tales of Terror, also attributed to M. G. Lewis
- William Sotheby, The Battle of the Nile, about Nelson's defeat of the French fleet in the Battle of the Nile on August 1, 1798
- Robert Southey, Poems ... The Second Volume, including the original Book 9 of Joan of Arc ("the Vision of the Maid of Orleans") and new material (see also Poems 1796)
- Jane West
  - The Mother: a Poem in Five Books
  - Poems and Plays, vols 1 & 2

=== United States ===
- Richard Alsop, Lemuel Hopkins and Theodore Dwight, The Political Greenhouse, popular satirical verse with a Federalist attack on Thomas Jefferson, Democratic Republicans, France and Jacobins; first appeared in the Connecticut Courant; quoted in Congress
- Sarah Wentworth Morton, The Virtues of Society, narrative poem about a wounded British officer and his wife; adapted from part of Beacon Hill 1797
- Lindley Murray, editor, The English Reader; or, Pieces in Prose and Poetry Selected from the Best Writers, fiction, nonfiction and poetry

== Works published in other languages ==
- Tomás António Gonzaga, Marília de Dirceu, second part, Brazil in Portuguese
- Évariste-Désiré Parny, La Guerre des dieux, anti-Christian mock epic; France

== Births ==
Death years link to the corresponding "[year] in poetry" article:

- March 12 – Mary Howitt, née "Botham" (died 1888) English poet, author of The Spider and the Fly
- April 17 – Eliza Acton (died 1859), English poet and cook
- May 11 – Robert Charles Sands (died 1832), American writer and poet
- May 23 – Thomas Hood (died 1845), English humorist and poet; father of playwright and editor Tom Hood
- June 6 – Alexander Pushkin (died 1837), Russian poet
- July 5 – John Abraham Heraud (died 1887), English epic poet
- October 9 – Louisa Stuart Costello (died 1870), English miniature-painter, poet, historical novelist and travel writer
- Also:
  - George Pirie (died 1870), Scottish-born Canadian newspaper publisher and poet
  - Gu Taiqing (died 1876), Chinese poet during the Qing Dynasty (a woman)
  - Sukey Vickery (died 1821), American novelist and poet (a woman)

== Deaths ==
Death years link to the corresponding "[year] in poetry" article:

- February 24 – Georg Christoph Lichtenberg (born 1742), German writer, poet, mathematician and the first German professor of experimental physics
- August 15 – Giuseppe Parini (born 1729), Italian satirist and poet
- William Cliffton (born 1772), American
- Johann Christoph Krauseneck (born 1738), German

== See also ==
- Poetry
- List of years in poetry
- List of years in literature
- 18th century in literature
- 18th century in poetry
- Romantic poetry
