= 1834 in poetry =

Nationality words link to articles with information on the nation's poetry or literature (for instance, Irish or France).

== Works published ==
=== United Kingdom ===
- Samuel Taylor Coleridge, Poetical Works, including "On Quitting School" (last edition proofread by the author, who died this year)
- Sara Coleridge, Pretty Lessons in Verse for Good Children
- George Crabbe, The Poetical Works of George Crabbe (includes letters, journals and a biography by Crabbe's son; published in eight volumes from February through September)
- Dafydd ap Gwilym (died c.1350), Translations into English Verse from the Poems of Davyth ap Gwilym, a Welsh Bard of the Fourteenth Century, translated from the Welsh by "Maelog" (Arthur James Johnes)
- Thomas De Quincey, Recollections of the Lake Poets, beginning this year, a series of essays published in Tait's Edinburgh Magazine on the Lake Poets, including William Wordsworth and Robert Southey; this year, essays on Samuel Taylor Coleridge were published from September through November, with another in January 1835 (see also Recollections 1839; last essay in the series was published in 1840)
- Charlotte Elliott, editor, The Invalid's Hymn Book (anthology)
- A. H. Hallam (died 1833), Remains in Verse and Prose, including a memoir by Henry Hallam
- R. S. Hawker, Records of the Western Shore
- Felicia Dorothea Hemans:
  - National Lyrics, and Songs for Music
  - Scenes and Hymns of Life
- Mary Howitt, The Seven Temptations
- Letitia Elizabeth Landon, writing under the pen name "L.E.L." "The "Fairy of the Fountains" (in Fisher's Drawing Room Scrap Book, 1835)
- Richard Monckton Milnes, Memorials of a Tour in Some Parts of Greece, Chiefly Poetical
- Thomas Moore, Irish Melodies
- Amelia Opie, Lays for the Dead
- Thomas Pringle, African Sketches
- Catherine Eliza Richardson Poems: Second Series
- Samuel Rogers, Poems
- Percy Bysshe Shelley (died 1822), The Works of Percy Bysshe Shelley, with the Life, unauthorized; parts were reissued this year as Posthumous Poems
- Henry Taylor, Philip van Artevelde
- Alfred Tennyson, "Morte d'Arthur", completed by October but not published until Poems 1842

=== Other ===
- Thomas Holley Chivers, Conrad and Eudora; or, the Death of Alonzo, United States
- Pierre-Jean de Béranger, Oeuvres complètes, France
- Adam Mickiewicz, Pan Tadeusz, czyli ostatni zajazd na Litwie. Historia szlachecka z roku 1811 i 1812 we dwunastu księgach wierszem pisana ("Mister Thaddeus, or the Last Foray in Lithuania: a History of the Nobility in the Years 1811 and 1812 in Twelve Books of Verse"), also known simply as "Pan Tadeusz", an epic poem in Polish, published in June in Paris
- Frederik Paludan-Muller, Amor og Psyche ("Cupid and Psyche"), a verse drama, Denmark
- France Prešeren, A Wreath of Sonnets (Slovene: Sonetni venec) and Sonnets of Unhappiness (Slovene: Sonetje nesreče), Slovenia (Austro-Hungarian Empire)
- Friedrich Rückert, Gesammelte Gedichte (Collected Poems), begins publication in 6 volumes (to 1838), Germany
- Cynthia Taggart, Poems, United States

== Births ==
Death years link to the corresponding "[year] in poetry" article:

- 7 February – Estanislao del Campo (died 1880), Argentine poet
- 24 March – William Morris (died 1896), English poet and designer
- 27 March – Melissa Elizabeth Riddle Banta (died 1907), American poet
- 5 May – Emily Rebecca Page (died 1862), American poet and editor
- 24 June – George Arnold (died 1865), American author and poet
- 9 July – Jan Neruda (died 1891), Czech writer
- 27 August – Roden Noel (died 1894), English poet
- 1 October – Mary Mackellar, née Cameron (died 1890), Scottish Gaelic poet and translator
- 2 November – Harriet McEwen Kimball (died 1917), American poet, hymnwriter, philanthropist
- 10 November – José Hernández (died 1886), Argentine poet
- 23 November – James Thomson (died 1882), Scottish poet publishing under the pen name "Bysshe Vanolis"

== Deaths ==
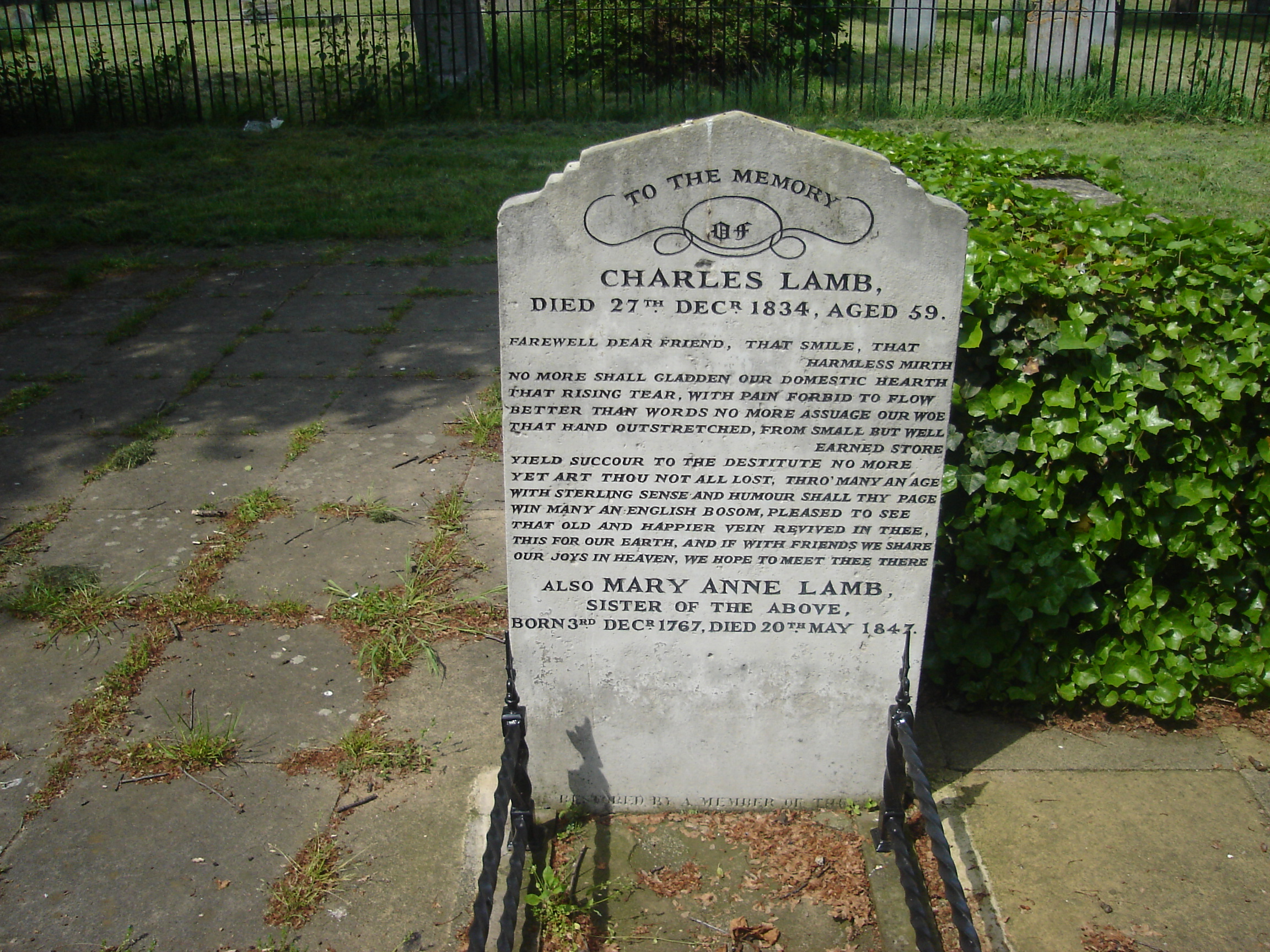
Charles and Mary Lamb's grave

Birth years link to the corresponding "[year] in poetry" article:

- 17 February – John Thelwall (born 1764), radical English orator, writer, elocutionist and poet
- 23 February – Karl Ludwig von Knebel (born 1744), German poet and translator
- 25 July – Samuel Taylor Coleridge, English Romantic poet, critic and writer
- 5 December – Thomas Pringle (born 1789), Scottish writer, poet and abolitionist
- 27 December – Charles Lamb, English, poet, playwright, critic and essayist

== See also ==
- 19th century in literature
- 19th century in poetry
- Golden Age of Russian Poetry (1800–1850)
- List of poetry awards
- List of poets
- List of years in poetry
- List of years in literature
- Poetry
- Young Germany (Junges Deutschland) a loose group of German writers from about 1830 to 1850
