= Anne Bannerman =

Scottish poet (1765–1829)

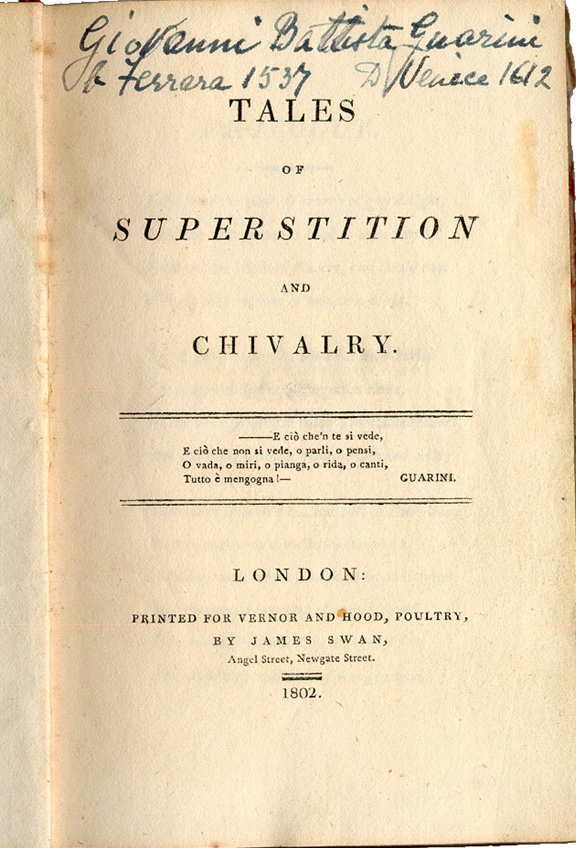
- Title page, Anon. [Anne Bannerman], Tales of Superstition and Chivalry (Vernor and Hood, 1802)
- Born: 31 October 1765; Edinburgh, Scotland
- Died: 29 September 1829 (aged 63); Portobello, Edinburgh
- Occupation: Poet
- Relatives: Isobel (née Dick) Bannerman (mother); William Bannerman (father)
- Writing career
- Pen name: Augusta
- Period: Romantic

Anne Bannerman (31 October 1765 – 29 September 1829) was a Scottish poet. She was part of the Edinburgh literary circle which included John Leyden, Jessie Stewart, Thomas Campbell, and Robert Anderson. Her work was popular in her lifetime and "remains significant for her Gothic ballads, as well as for her innovative sonnet series and her bold original odes."

== Early life ==
Bannerman was born in Edinburgh to Isobel (née Dick) and William Bannerman, a "running stationer" licensed to sell ballads in the streets.

== Career ==
Bannerman's early work was published, often pseudonymously, in periodicals, notably the Monthly Magazine, the Poetical Register, and the Edinburgh Magazine, the latter of which was edited by her friend and supporter, Dr Robert Anderson. She was read and admired by Thomas Park, James Currie, Bishop Thomas Percy, Anne Grant, and antiquary Joseph Cooper Walker. Her first volume, Poems (1800), was well regarded but did not sell well. It contains a series of odes, original sonnets, a sonnet series translated from Petrarch, and another based on The Sorrows of Werther. In these two latter Bannerman developed Joanna Baillie's theory of dramatic composition – her stated intent to focus on the progress of one master passion – and applied it to poetry. Her second collection, Tales of Superstition and Chivalry (1802) was published anonymously. It consisted of ten Gothic ballads and four engravings and did not fare so well with reviewers, in part because of her penchant for the strain of obscurity and ambiguity within the Gothic tradition. Her ballads were, however, praised by Walter Scott.

After the deaths of her mother and brother, she struggled financially and was a governess for a period despite precarious health. Although various of her friends supported her and sought to procure her a pension, such attempts were largely unsuccessful and she died in debt on 29 September 1829.

Contemporary scholars are rediscovering her work and she is the subject of several recent studies.

== Works ==
- "Epistle from the Marquis de Lafayette to General Washington" (attrib.; 1800)
- Tales of Superstition and Chivalry (pub. anon.; London: Ann Vernor and Thomas Hood, 1802) (Etext, British Women Romantic Poets Project).
- Poems, by Anne Bannerman. A New Edition (pub. by subscription; 1807), including "To Miss Baillie"
- "On the loss of a child in infancy." The Casket, a Miscellany, Consisting of Unpublished Poems. (London: John Murray, 1829, pp. 349–350).
- "The Exile." The Laurel. Fugitive Poetry of the XIXth Century. (London: John Sharpe, 1830, pp. 290–291).

== See also ==
- List of 18th-century labouring-class writers (England, Wales, and Great Britain)

== Bibliography ==
- "Bannerman, Anne (1765–1829)." The Feminist Companion to Literature in English. Virginia Blain, et al., eds. New Haven and London: Yale UP, 1990. 56–57.
- "Bannerman, Anne." The Women's Print History Project, 2019, Person ID 15. Accessed 2022-08-08. (WPHP)
- Craciun, Adriana. "Anne Bannerman: A Critical Introduction." Scottish Women Poets of the Romantic Period. 2005.
- Craciun, Adriana. "Bannerman, Anne (1765–1829)." Oxford Dictionary of National Biography. Ed. H. C. G. Matthew and Brian Harrison. Oxford: OUP, 2004. 28 Mar. 2007.

== Etexts ==
- "The Exile." The Laurel. Fugitive Poetry of the XIXth Century. (London: John Sharpe, 1830, pp. 290–291). (HathiTrust)
- "On the loss of a child in infancy." The Casket, a Miscellany, Consisting of Unpublished Poems. (London: John Murray, 1829, pp. 349–350) (Internet Archive)
- Poems. A new ed. Edinburgh: Printed by Mundell, Doig, & Stevenson, 1807. (HathiTrust)
- Tales of Superstition and Chivalry (pub. anon.; London: Ann Vernor and Thomas Hood, 1802) (Internet Archive) (Archived transcription; British Women Romantic Poets Project).
