= Sadhu Ram Sharma =

Indian politician (born 1921)

Personal details
- Born: 25 May 1921 Haryana, India
- Party: Indian National Congress
- Children: Ashok Kumar Sharma, Venod Kumar Sharma, Parmod Kuamr Sharma .

Sadhu Ram Sharma (born 25 May 1921) is an Indian politician who was the leader of the Indian National Congress party from Haryana, a state in the Punjab region of India. He was a member of the Rajya Sabha in the Indian Parliament. A noted Gandhi loyalist, he rose in political circles to become one of the most powerful men in Haryana.

== Personal life ==
Sadhu Ram Sharma was born into a Sharma family from Haryana in 1921. He received a B.Sc.(agri.) from Cornell University in the United States.

His brother Shankar Dayal Sharma was the president of India from 1992 to 1997. Sadhu Ram Sharma is also the father of Ashok Kumar Sharma, an MP in the Rajya Sabha under the banner of the Bharatiya Janata Party.

== Political initiation ==
During the 1940s Sadhu Ram Sharma was involved in the struggle for Indian independence from Britain. He joined the Indian National Congress with his brother Shanker Dayal Sharma. In the 1960s he became a member of the Rajya Sabha in the Indian Parliament, under the banner of the Indian National Congress.
