= Thomas Russell (poet) =

18th-century English poet

Thomas Russell (1762-July 31, 1788) was an English poet born at Beaminster early in 1762. He was the son of John Russell, an attorney at Bridport, in Dorsetshire, and his mother was Miss Virtue Brickle, of Shaftesbury. He was educated at the grammar school of Bridport and in 1777 proceeded to Winchester, where he stayed three years under Dr. Joseph Warton, and Thomas Warton the professor of poetry.

In 1780 Russell became a member of New College, Oxford. He graduated with a B.A. in 1784 and was ordained a priest in 1786. During his residence at the university, he devoted himself to French, Italian, Spanish, Portuguese, Provençal, and even German literature. His health, however, broke down, and he retired to Bristol Hotwells to drink the waters, but in vain, for he died there from consumption on the 31st of July 1788. He was buried in Powerstock churchyard, Dorset.

In 1789 was published a thin volume, containing his sonnets, and Miscellaneous Poems, now a very rare book. It contained twenty-three sonnets, of regular form and a few paraphrases and original lyrics. Russell is known for his sonnets, and he is known as a precursor of the romantic school. In War, Love, the Wizard, and the Fay, he rejected the narrow circle of subjects laid down for 18th century poets. In this he was certainly influenced both by Chatterton and by Coffins. But he was still more clearly the disciple of Petrarch, of Boccaccio and of Camoens, each of whom he had carefully and enthusiastically studied. His Sonnet Suppos'd to be Written at Lemnos, is considered his masterpiece, and is widely considered the greatest English sonnet of the 18th century.

The anonymous editor of Russell's solitary volume is said to have been William Howley (1766–1848), long afterwards archbishop of Canterbury, who was a youthful bachelor of New College when Russell, who had been his tutor, died. His memoir of the poet is very perfunctory, and the fullest account of Russell is that published in 1897 by Thomas Seccombe.

== Sources ==
- Collection of Thomas Russell sonnets, edited by Howley in 1789
