= George Arnold (poet) =

American author and poet

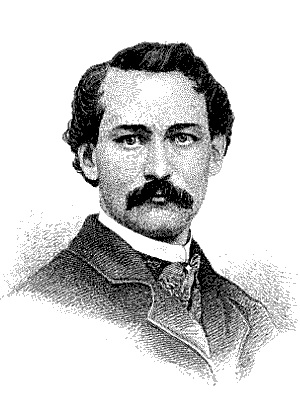
George Arnold

George Arnold (June 24, 1834 – November 9, 1865) was an American writer and poet.

He was born in New York City on June 24, 1834. After briefly attempting a career as a portrait painter, he turned to writing and became a regular contributor to Vanity Fair and The Leader. A contemporary of Walt Whitman, Arnold was likewise a patron of Pfaff's beer cellar.

His most enduring work is a humorous piece, The Jolly Old Pedagogue.

He died on November 9, 1865, in Monmouth County, New Jersey.
