= Whistle Binkie =

Scottish poetry and song anthology

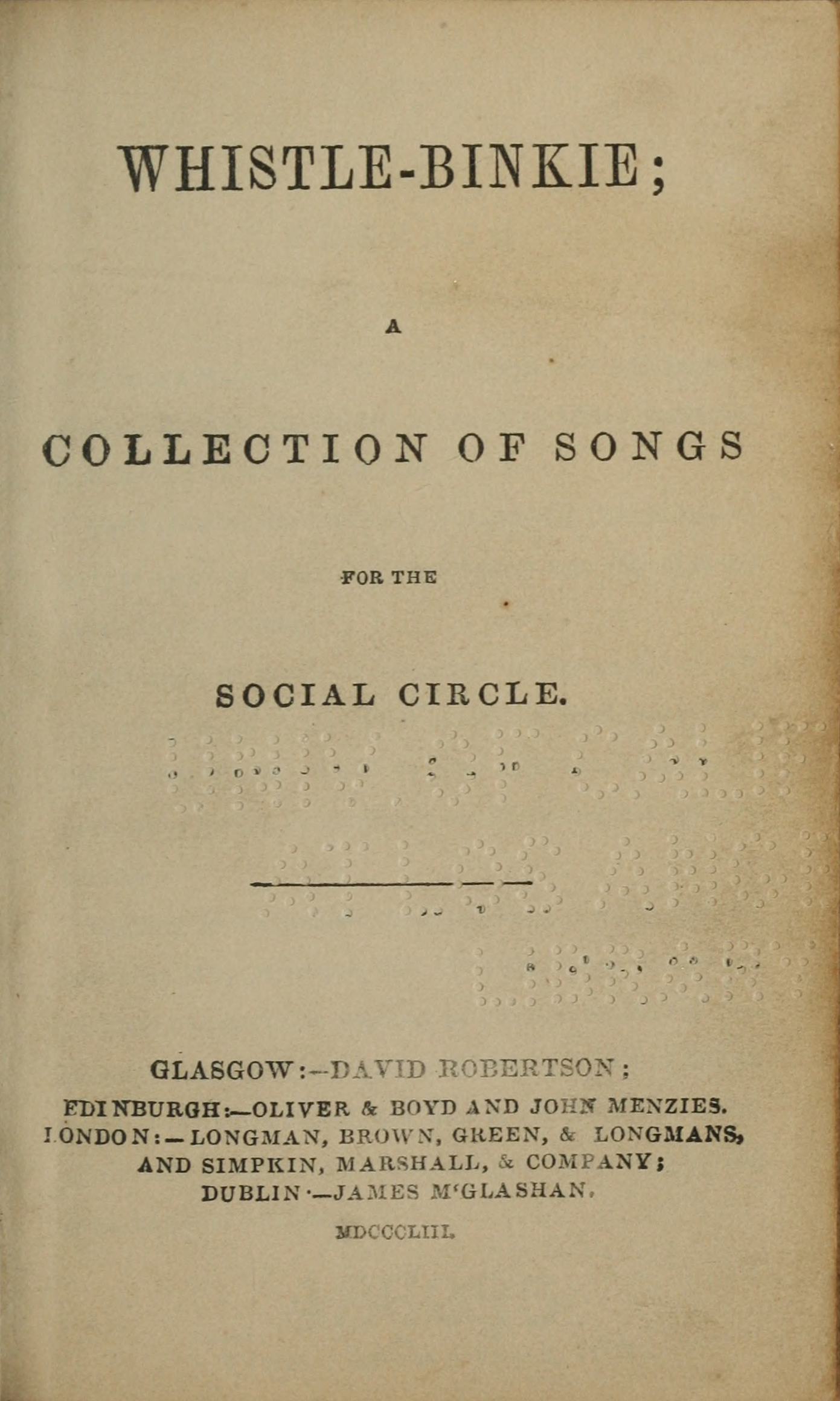

Whistle-Binkie, or, The piper of the party: Being a collection of songs for the social circle was a Scottish poetry and song anthology first appearing in 1832. There were later volumes under the same title, at least four more anthologies, and collected editions appearing from 1853. The style of verse typically was in imitation of Robert Burns. The series was enduringly popular, and the final Whistle Binkie anthology appeared in 1890.

While the intention at the time was to publish Scottish writers, later critics such as Edwin Morgan have attacked the series on grounds of taste. Alexander Laing saw in it "sentiment, mild pathos and sly humour" writing in 1857; by a century later Hugh MacDiarmid could regard it as opening the way for children to be given "sentimental trash".

== First edition ==
Whistle Binkie was published in 1832 by David Robertson, a bookseller in Trongate, Glasgow. The editor was John Donald Carrick, who also contributed to the collection.
