= Tales of Superstition and Chivalry =

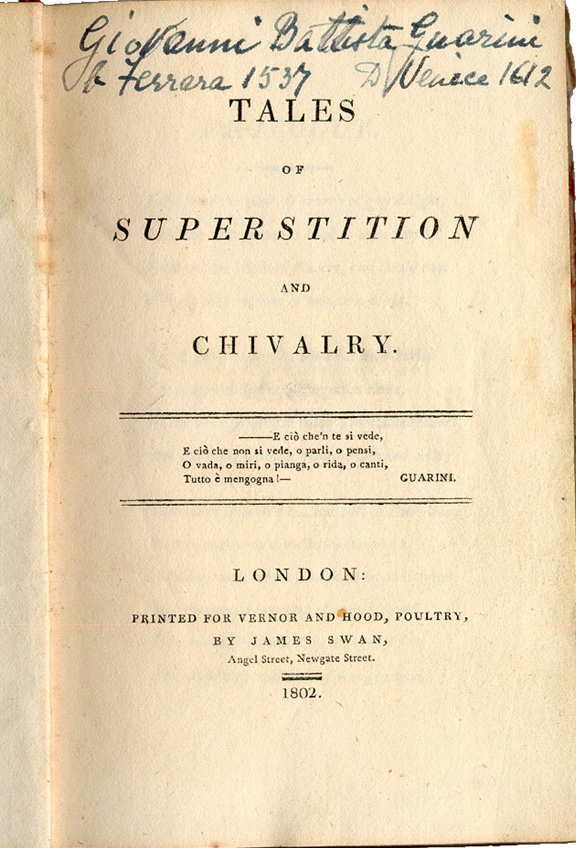
Title page, Anon. [Anne Bannerman], Tales of Superstition and Chivalry (Vernor and Hood, 1802)

Tales of Superstition and Chivalry was an illustrated Gothic ballad collection written by Anne Bannerman. It was published anonymously by Vernor and Hood in 1802, two years after her first volume, Poems. The reviews of Tales were not as favorable as for the earlier production, though it is often now considered her strongest work. In 1807, the two collections were combined, revised, and re-printed as Poems, a New Edition. The illustrations were handled by Thomas Park.

== Literary criticism ==
The Poetical Register, and Repository of Fugitive Poetry (1802):—

"Tales of Superstition and Chivalry." These are metrical tales, by a lady, it is rumoured, of high celebrity in the circle of our British Muses.

The British Critic (1803-01):—

"Tales of Superstition and Chivalry". 12mo. 144 pp. 4s. Vernor and Hood. 1802. This beautiful little book belongs, as its title implies, to the family of Tales of Wonder. It is printed without a name; but, if we are not misinformed, it is the production of Miss Bannerman, already known for poetical talents. The Tales abound with fancy; but it is fancy perverted to the purpose of raising only horror, and raising it by praeternatural agency. This uniformity has an effect not pleasing to those, who have not learnt to accommodate their taste to a transient fashion; and we, who can see through the disguise the marks of talent formed for better things, cannot but regret that the volume is not of a more miscellaneous kind. Its contents are ten Tales, illustrated by three plates; the third of which, prefixed to "the Murcian Cavalier," is not without elegance. The measure used in most of the Tales is of the ballad kind, and an imitation of ancient simplicity seems every where to be intended. As the effect of such narratives arises from the whole context, we shall not attempt to give a partial specimen; but, recommending the book to those who love to shudder o’er the midnight fire, we advise the author to make a livelier and better use of a fancy stored with images.
