= 1838 in philosophy =

1838 in philosophy

== Events ==
- May 21 - The People's Charter is drawn up in the United Kingdom, demanding universal suffrage
- July 15 - Ralph Waldo Emerson delivers the "Divinity School Address" at Harvard University
- University of Belgrade Faculty of Philosophy founded

== Publications ==
- Jacques Boucher de Crèvecœur de Perthes, De La Création, Essai sur L'Origine et la Progression des Êtres, 1st part
- S. D. Poisson, Recherches sur la probabilité des jugements en matière criminelle et en matière civile

== Births ==
- January 16 - Franz Brentano (died 1917)
- February 16 - Henry Adams (died 1918)
- February 18 - Ernst Mach (died 1916)
- March 14 - Robert Flint (died 1910)
- September 2 - Bhaktivinoda Thakur (died 1914)
- December 20 - Edwin Abbott Abbott (died 1926)

== Deaths ==
- March 13 - Poul Martin Møller (born 1794)
