= Frederick Jennings Thomas =

British Royal Navy rear admiral

Rear-Admiral Frederick Jennings Thomas
- Born: 19 April 1786
- Died: 19 December 1855 (aged 59)
- Occupation: Royal Navy rear-admiral

Frederick Jennings Thomas (19 April 1786 – 19 December 1855) was a British Royal Navy rear-admiral.

== Biography ==
Thomas was the younger son of Sir John Thomas (1749–1828) of Wenvoe Castle, Glamorganshire, fifth baronet, by his wife Mary, daughter of John Parker of Hasfield Court, Gloucestershire, was born on 19 April 1786. He entered the navy in March 1799 on board the Boston on the North American station, and afterwards in the West Indies. In the autumn of 1803 he joined the Prince of Wales, flagship of Sir Robert Calder, and was present in the action of 22 July 1805. On 19 September he was appointed acting lieutenant of the Spartiate, and in her was present in the battle of Trafalgar. His commission as lieutenant was confirmed on 14 February 1806. He continued in the Spartiate off Rochefort, and afterwards in the Mediterranean till November 1809, when he was for a few months on board the Antelope, the flagship of Sir John Duckworth, and was then sent to Cadiz, where he was employed for the next three years in the defence of the town against the French flotilla; was promoted to be commander on 4 March 1811, and second in command of the English flotilla. Towards the end of 1813 he was acting captain of the San Juan, the flagship of Rear-admiral Samuel Hood Linzee at Gibraltar. He was posted on 8 December 1813, and returned to England with Linzee in the Eurotas in 1814. He had no further employment afloat, but married on 7 August 1816, Susannah, daughter of Arthur Atherley of Southampton, and seems to have settled down in that neighbourhood. He accepted the retired rank of rear-admiral on 1 October 1846, and died at Hill, near Southampton, on 19 December 1855, leaving three sons and a daughter. He was buried at Millbrook, near Southampton.
