= Andrew Henderson (portrait painter) =

Scottish portrait-painter (1783–1835)

Andrew Henderson (12 June 1783 – 9 April 1835) was a Scottish portrait-painter.

== Life ==
Henderson was born at Cleish, near Kinross in Scotland, in 1783, son of the gardener to Lord Chief Commissioner William Adam of Blair Adam. He was apprenticed at the age of thirteen to his brother Thomas in General Scott's gardens at Bellevue, Edinburgh, and was subsequently employed in the Earl of Kinnoull's gardens at Dupplin Castle and in the Earl of Hopetoun's gardens at Hopetoun House.

His constitution was regarded as not strong enough for outdoor work, so he obtained work in Paisley, Renfrewshire, eventually becoming foreman of a company there. His love of pictorial art led him, however, to attend a drawing-school, and eventually he decided to become an artist. In March 1809 he went to London and studied for three or four years at the Royal Academy.

In 1813 Henderson returned to Scotland and settled in Glasgow as a portrait-painter, practising with considerable local success for about twenty years. He exhibited at the Royal Scottish Academy in Edinburgh in 1828, 1829, and 1830. He was a founder member in 1825 of the Glasgow Dilettanti Society, and he exhibited there from 1828.

His character is described by Lionel Henry Cust in the Dictionary of National Biography: "Henderson was a man of extremely original character, of fiery temperament and violent impetuosity in speech, yet full of broad humour, and much beloved by his intimate friends. He was large and ungainly in figure, but possessed a sharp, shrill voice."

In 1832 he published in Edinburgh Scottish Proverbs, with etchings by himself, and a preface by his friend William Motherwell; a second edition was published in London in 1876 without the etchings. Henderson, Motherwell and a third friend, John Donald Carrick, were the chief contributors to The Laird of Logan; Anecdotes and Tales illustrative of the Wit and Humour of Scotland. The book contains many anecdotes of Henderson, and the preface supplies biographies of the three friends. It was published posthumously in 1835, and reprinted in 1889.

Henderson never married. He died of an apoplectic fit in Glasgow, on 9 April 1835, and was buried in the Glasgow Necropolis.
