= Ram Sharma =

Ram Sharma (1837–1918) was a nineteenth-century Indo-Anglian poet who alternately criticized and praised the government in his poems and newspaper articles. He began his literary career in the 1860s but pursued steady writing only after his retirement from a government post in 1878. He practiced Yoga for 40 years.

== Poetry ==
His poem, Ode on The Meeting of Congress at Allahabad, on 26 December 1888 was considered one of his most powerful poems. Some of his other poems are:

- Willow Drops, published 1874-75
- Our Greetings to His Royal Highness Albert Victor of Wales, which first brought him to prominence
- Siva Ratri, which has similarities to Bunyan's Pilgrim's Progress
- Bhagobati Gita, a Keatsian expression of Ram Sharma's mystical perceptions
- The Last Day, a dream fantasy, together with Siva Ratri and Bhagobati Gita are the most expressive of Ram Sharma's genius and talent.
- Unheard Melodies, a fluent and elegant expression of his deeper spiritual experiences
- Mohinee
- Stanzas to Lord Lytton's Infant Son
- Song of the Indian Conservative
- To Our Pseudo-social Reformers
- India's Welcome---To Mr Bradlaugh and Her Other English Friends
- India to Britain
- To England
- The Jolly Beggars
- In Memoriam: Michael Madhusudan Dutt and A Prayer.
