= Frederick William Thomas (writer) =

American writer (1806–1866)

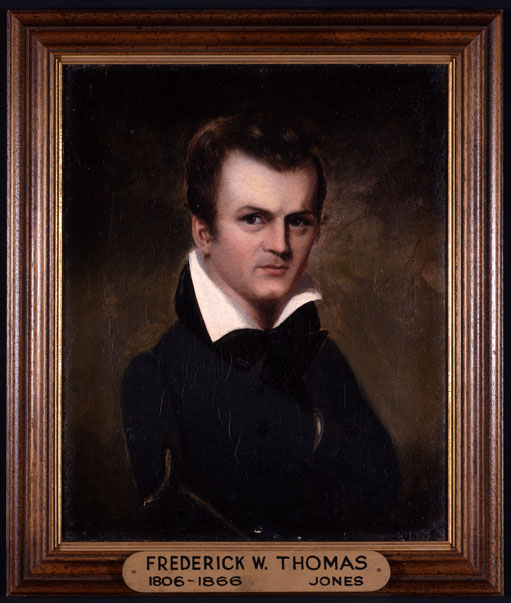
- Born: October 25, 1806; Providence
- Died: August 27, 1866 (aged 59)
- Occupation: Writer
- Parent(s): Ebenezer Smith Thomas

Frederick William Thomas (October 25, 1806 – August 27, 1866 in Washington, D.C.) was an American writer.

== Biography ==
He was born in Providence, Rhode Island, the son of Ebenezer Smith Thomas, a journalist and a nephew of printer Isaiah Thomas. He was educated in Baltimore, Maryland, where he studied law, and was admitted to the bar in 1828. In 1830 he moved to Cincinnati and assisted his father in editing the Advertiser, in which appeared his song “'Tis said that absence conquers love.” He became an associate editor of the Democratic Intelligencer in 1834, and of the Evening Post in 1835. From 1841 until 1850, he was a clerk in the United States Department of the Treasury in Washington, D.C., for which he selected a library. In 1850 he returned to Cincinnati, entered the ministry of the Methodist Episcopal Church and preached in that city. Subsequently, he was professor of rhetoric and English literature in the University of Alabama, and in 1858 resumed the practice of law in Cambridge, Maryland. In 1860 he took charge of the literary department of the Richmond Enquirer, and afterward became editorially connected with the South Carolinian of Columbia. He traveled extensively through the southern states, was a successful lecturer, and occasionally took part in politics.

== Works ==
- The Emigrant, Or, Reflections While Descending the Ohio (1832), a book of poetry about the Ohio River region
- Clinton Bradshaw; or, The Adventures of a Lawyer (1835), famous for its courtroom scene
- East and West (1836), set in western Pennsylvania
- Howard Pinckney (1840), a detective story.
- The Beechen Tree, a Tale told in Rhyme, and other Poems (New York, 1844)
- Sketches of Character, and Tales founded on Fact (Louisville, 1849)
- John Randolph of Roanoke, and other Sketches of Character, including William Wirt; together with Tales of Real Life (Philadelphia, 1853)

He maintained a correspondence with Edgar Allan Poe and became his closest confidant.
