= John Donald Carrick =

Scottish journalist and songwriter

- Born: April 1787; Glasgow, Scotland
- Died: 17 August 1837 (aged 50); Glasgow, Scotland
- Occupations: Journalist, songwriter
- Known for: Life of Sir William Wallace of Elderslie; Whistle-Binkie, or the Piper of the Party

John Donald Carrick (April 1787 – 17 August 1837) was a Scottish journalist and songwriter.

== Early life, family and education ==
Carrick was born in Glasgow in April 1787. His father was originally from Buchlyvie in Stirlingshire. He was placed in the office of Nicholson, a Glasgow architect, while still young, leaving about 1805 for a clerkship in a counting-house. In 1807 he ran away, and walked to London, where a Scottish tradesman gave him a trial as shopboy.

== Career ==
In 1809 Carrick was working at Spode & Co., potters in Staffordshire, who had warehouses in London. He acquired sufficient knowledge of the business to return to Glasgow in 1811 and set up shop in Hutcheson Street. In 1825 prolonged litigation led to his insolvency. As agent to manufacturers, he visited the Highlands, where he learned Gaelic.

Returning to Glasgow in 1828, Carrick was engaged as sub-editor of the Scots Times. In 1833 he accepted the editorship of the Perth Advertiser, but he quarrelled with the managing committee in a year, and in February 1834 started the Kilmarnock Journal. He again fell out with the proprietors and was attacked by paralysis of the mouth.

== Works ==
In Glasgow Carrick took to writing, producing several humorous Scotch songs, and a Life of Wallace for the young. Later he contributed articles to The Day, a Glasgow daily paper which lasted only six months; and published 1830, his extended Life of Sir William Wallace of Elderslie, 2 vols. (vols. liii. and liv. of Constable's Miscellany). In 1832 he edited and partly wrote Whistle-Binkie, or the Piper of the Party, a collection of humorous songs.

Carrick edited and contributed to the Laird of Logan a collection of Scotch tales and witticism, which appeared in 1835. From Rothesay he contributed some papers to the Scottish Monthly Magazine, and announced a new work, Tales of the Bannock Men. He left in manuscript Logan House, or the Laird at Home, a comedy. A new edition of the Laird of Logan, accompanied by an anonymous "Biographical Sketch". came out in 1841. Whistle-Binkie appeared in numerous issues.

== Personal life and demise ==
In 1835, he returned to Glasgow, in bad health. He died 17 August 1837 at age 50.
