= Golden Age of Russian Poetry =

First half of the 19th century

Golden Age of Russian Poetry (or Age of Pushkin) is the name traditionally applied by philologists to the first half of the 19th century. This characterization was first used by the critic Peter Pletnev in 1824 who dubbed the epoch "the Golden Age of Russian Literature."

== Poets ==
The most significant Russian poet Pushkin (in Nabokov's words, the greatest poet this world was blessed with since the time of Shakespeare) and some scholars even refer to this period as the "Age of Pushkin". Mikhail Lermontov and Fyodor Tyutchev are generally regarded as two most important Romantic poets after Pushkin. Other poets include Pyotr Vyazemsky, Anton Delvig, Kondraty Ryleyev, Vasily Zhukovsky and Konstantin Batyushkov. Pushkin himself, however, considered Evgeny Baratynsky to be the finest poet of his day.

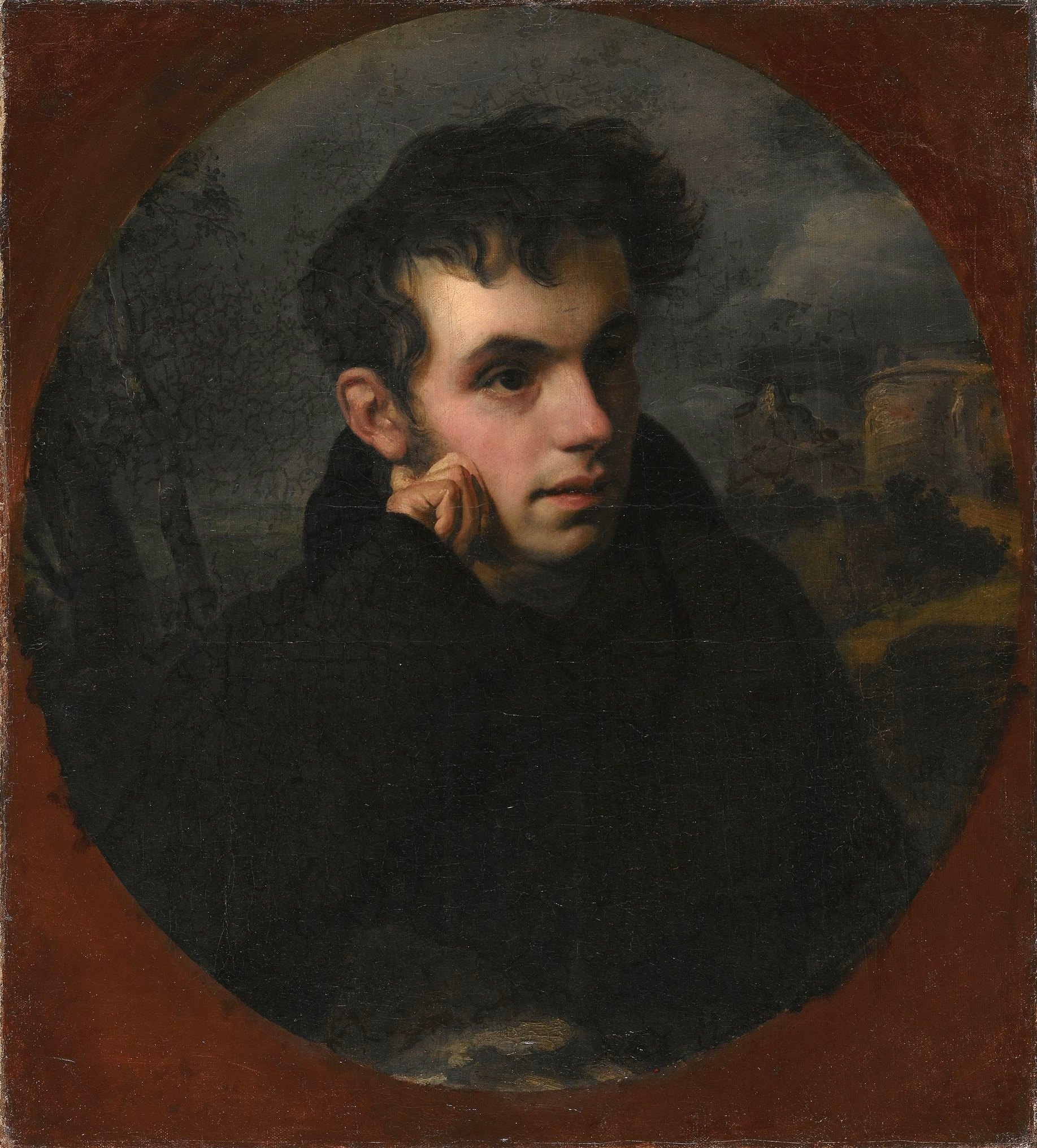
Vasily Zhukovsky

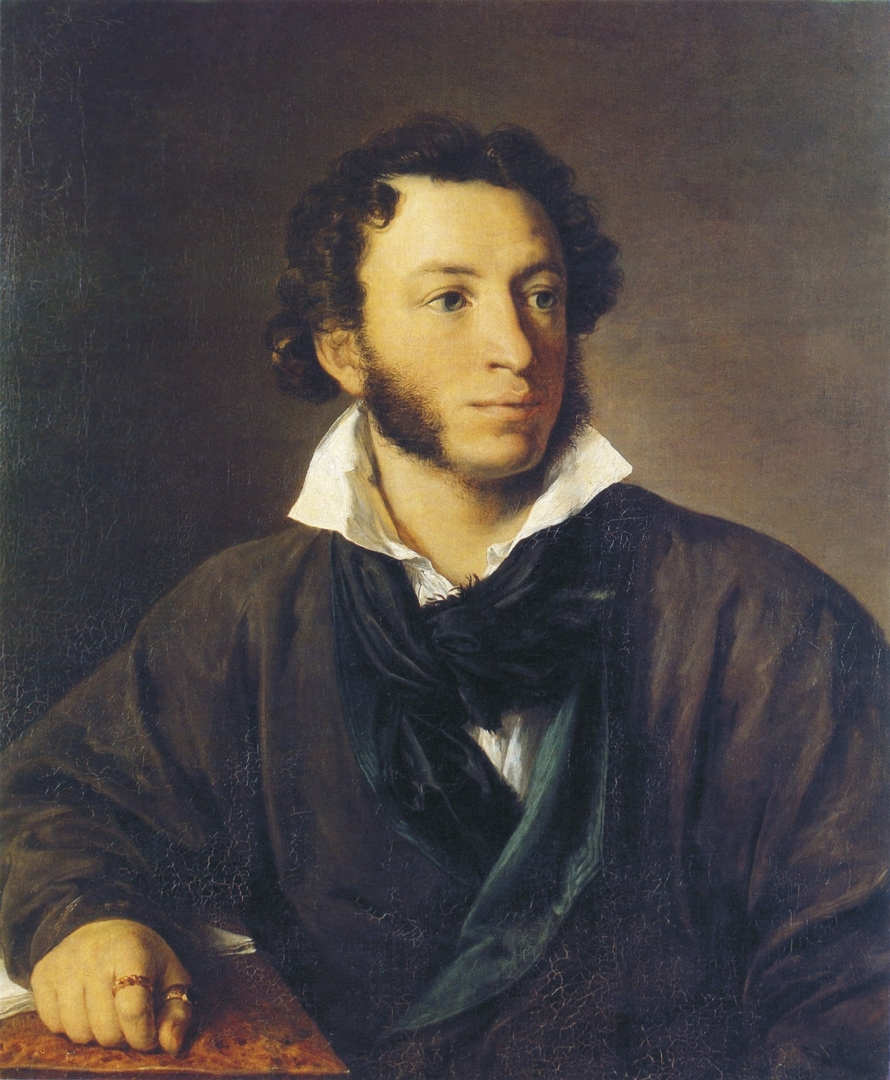
Alexander Pushkin

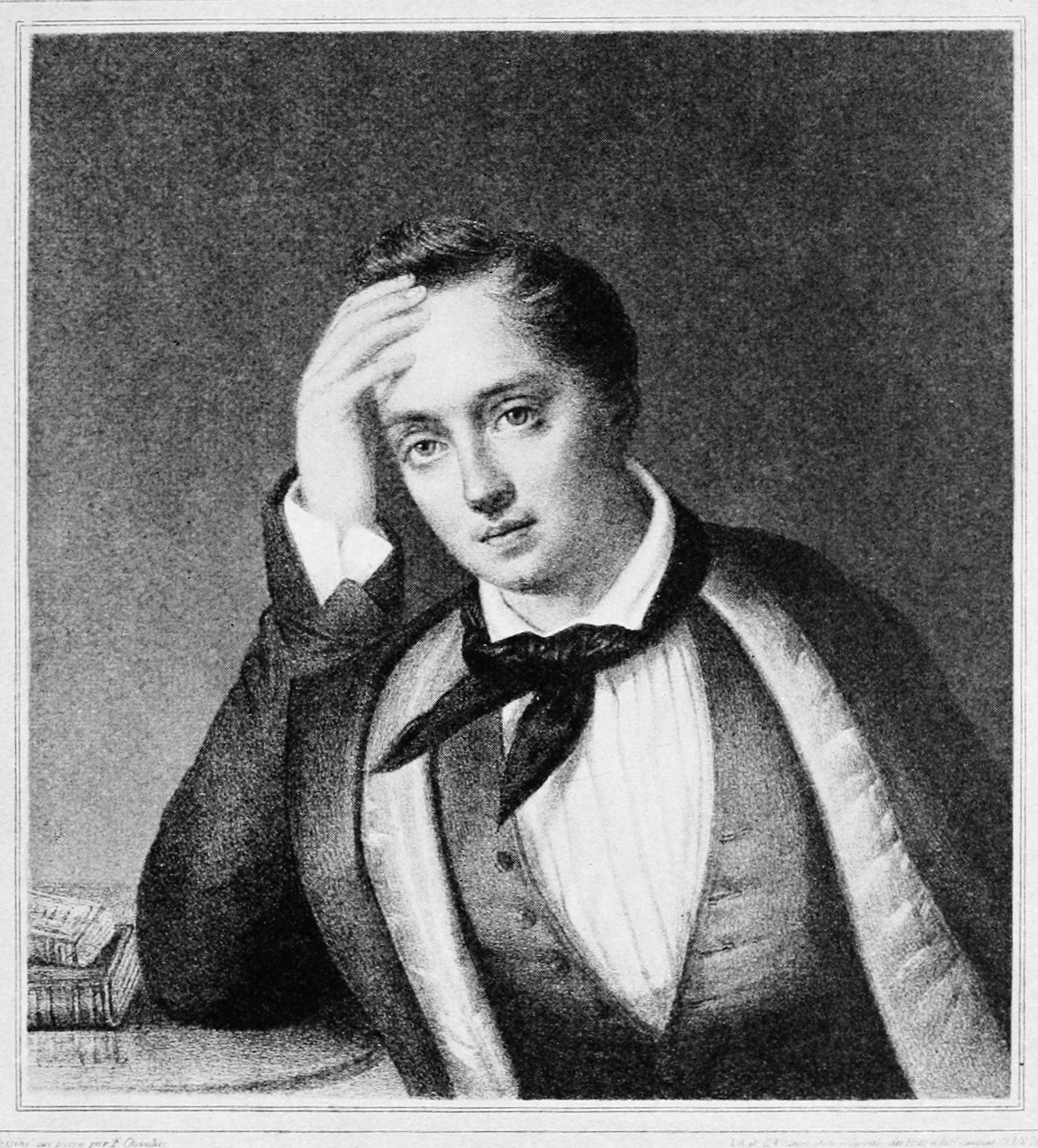
Evgeny Baratynsky

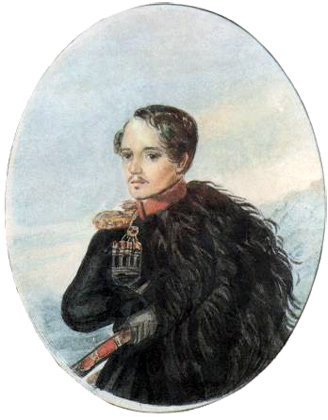
Mikhail Lermontov

== See also ==
- Silver Age of Russian Poetry
- List of Russian-language poets
