= 1848 in literature =

This article contains information about the literary events and publications of 1848.

== Events ==
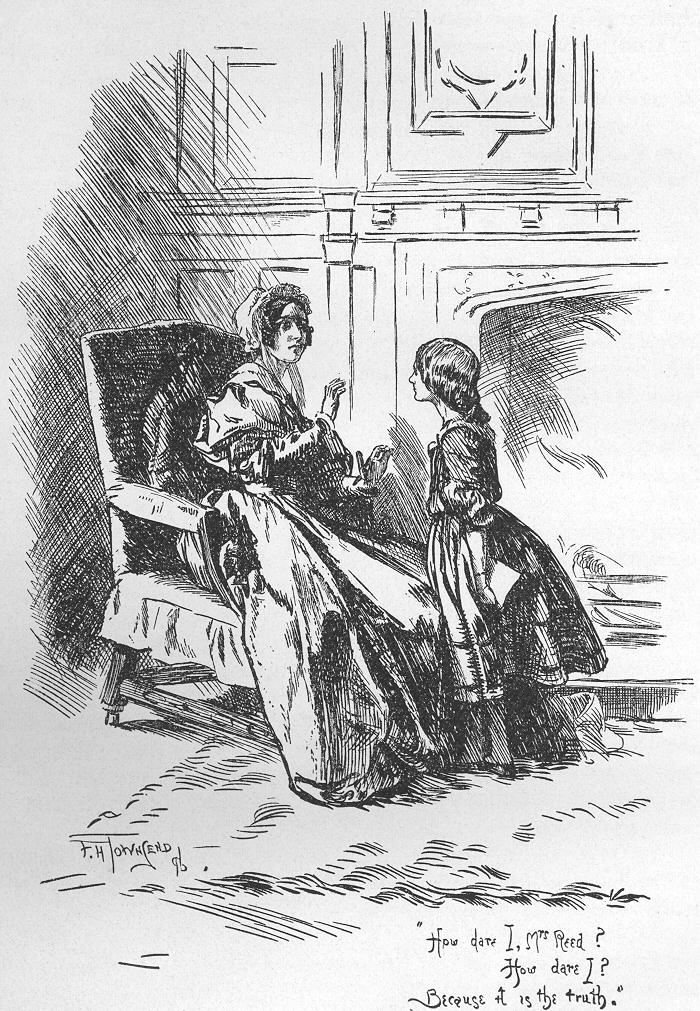
Young Jane Eyre argues with her guardian, Mrs Reed of Gateshead, illustration by F. H. Townsend

- January 22 – The second edition of Charlotte Brontë's Jane Eyre is dedicated to William Makepeace Thackeray. It is also first published in the United States this year.
- February 21 – Karl Marx and Friedrich Engels publish The Communist Manifesto (Manifest der Kommunistischen Partei) in London.
- March 15 – Revolutions of 1848 in the Austrian Empire: Hungarian Revolution of 1848 – The poet Sándor Petőfi with Mihály Táncsics and other young men lead the bloodless revolution in Pest, reciting Petőfi's "Nemzeti dal" (National song) and the "12 points" and printing them on the presses of Landerer és Heckenast, so forcing Ferdinand I of Austria to abolish censorship.
- March 18 – The Boston Public Library is founded by an act of the Great and General Court of Massachusetts.
- April 1 – Charles Dickens's novel Dombey and Son concludes its serial publication.
- April 10 – John Ruskin marries Effie Gray.
- May 5 – Poet Alfred de Musset is dismissed as librarian of the Ministry of the Interior under the French Second Republic.
- c. June 27 – The second and final novel of Anne Brontë (as Acton Bell), The Tenant of Wildfell Hall is published in London. It sells out in six weeks, requiring a reissue.
- July – Serial publication of William Makepeace Thackeray's novel Vanity Fair by Punch magazine concludes. It appears in book format (from the same typesetting) by Bradbury and Evans in London, with illustrations by the author.
- October 1 – At the funeral of Branwell Brontë, his younger sister Emily begins to show symptoms of a cold, soon revealed to be tuberculosis.
- October 15 – Elizabeth Gaskell's first novel, Mary Barton: A Tale of Manchester Life is published anonymously by Chapman & Hall in London in two volumes.
- c. October – The first frescoes of scenes from English literature in the Poets' Hall of the Palace of Westminster are completed: Charles West Cope's Griselda's first Trial of Patience (based on Chaucer's The Clerk's Tale) and John Callcott Horsley's Satan touched by Ithuriel's Spear while whispering evil dreams to Eve (based on Milton's Paradise Lost).
- November
  - William Makepeace Thackeray's novel The History of Pendennis begins its serial publication.
  - The London publisher George Routledge begins issuing the Railway Library series of cheap reprint novels, pioneering the yellow-back genre, with an edition of James Fenimore Cooper's The Pilot.
- December 22 – Three days after her death from tuberculosis at Haworth Parsonage, aged 30, Emily Brontë is buried in her father's St Michael and All Angels' Church, Haworth. The funeral procession is led by her father and her dog, Keeper.
- unknown date – The first issue of the penny dreadful Gentleman Jack, or Life on the Road, probably by James Malcolm Rymer, is published in London by Edward Lloyd. Inspired by the life of the highwayman Claude Duval (hanged 1670), but opening in 1780, the series will reach over 200 parts by 1852 and be popular on both sides of the Atlantic.

== New books ==
=== Fiction ===
- W. Harrison Ainsworth
  - The Lancashire Witches (serialised in The Sunday Times)
  - James the Second
- Willibald Alexis – Der Werwulf
- R. M. Ballantyne – Life in the Wilds of North America
- Anne Brontë – The Tenant of Wildfell Hall
- Edward Bulwer-Lytton – Harold, the Last of the Saxons
- William Carleton – The Emigrants of Ahadarra
- Charles Dickens
  - Dombey and Son
  - The Haunted Man and the Ghost's Bargain
- Fyodor Dostoevsky – White Nights
- Alexandre Dumas, fils – La Dame aux caméllias
- Elizabeth Gaskell – Mary Barton
- Geraldine Jewsbury – The Half Sisters
- Julia Kavanagh – Madeleine, a Tale of Auvergne
- Charles Kingsley – Yeast
- Eliza Lynn Linton – Amymone: a romance of the days of Pericles
- Frederick Marryat
  - The Little Savage
  - Valerie
- Henri Murger – Scènes de la vie de Bohème
- John Henry Newman – Loss and Gain: the story of a convert
- G. W. M. Reynolds
  - The Coral Island, or the Hereditary Curse
  - Wagner the Wehr-Wolf
- Adele Schopenhauer – Eine dänische Geschichte (A Danish Story)
- William Makepeace Thackeray – The Book of Snobs
- Anthony Trollope – The Kellys and the O'Kellys

=== Children and young people ===
- Cecil Frances Alexander – Hymns for Little Children (includes "All Things Bright and Beautiful" and "Once in Royal David's City"
- Catherine Crowe – Pippie's Warning, or, Mind Your Temper

=== Drama ===
- Émile Augier – L'Aventurière
- Alfred de Musset – André del Sarto

=== Poetry ===
- William Edmonstoune Aytoun – Lays of the Scottish Cavaliers
- Edward Bulwer-Lytton – King Arthur (1848-9)
- James Russell Lowell – A Fable for Critics, The Biglow Papers
- Charles Masson – Legends of the Afghan countries, in verse
- Johan Ludvig Runeberg – The Tales of Ensign Stål

=== Non-fiction ===
- Ivar Aasen – Det norske Folkesprogs Grammatik (Grammar of the Norwegian Dialects)
- George Catlin – Eight Years' Travels and Residence in Europe
- Wilkie Collins – Memoirs of the Life of William Collins
- Catherine Crowe – The Night-side of Nature
- Jacob Grimm – Geschichte der deutschen Sprache (History of the German Language)
- Benjamin Randell Harris – The Recollections of Rifleman Harris
- Søren Kierkegaard – The Point of View of My Work as an Author (Om min Forfatter-Virksomhed)
- Thomas Babington Macaulay – The History of England from the Accession of James the Second, Vols 1–2
- Harriet Martineau – Household Education
- Karl Marx and Friedrich Engels – The Communist Manifesto
- Charles Delucena Meigs – Females and Their Diseases; A Series of Letters to His Class
- John Stuart Mill – Principles of Political Economy
- Monckton Milnes – Life, Letters and Literary Remains of John Keats
- Edgar Allan Poe – Eureka: A Prose Poem
- George Ayliffe Poole – A History of Ecclesiastical Architecture in England
- Percy Bolingbroke St John – French Revolution in 1848: The three days of February, 1848; with sketches of Lamartine, Guizot, etc.
- Ephraim George Squier and Edwin Hamilton Davis – Ancient Monuments of the Mississippi Valley
- Harriet Ward – Five years in Kaffirland: with sketches of the late war in that country to the conclusion of peace, written on the spot
- John Collins Warren – Etherization: with Surgical Remarks

== Births ==
- January 6 – Hristo Botev, Bulgarian poet and journalist (died 1876)
- January 28 – Mary Elizabeth Hawker, Scottish-born English fiction writer (died 1908)
- February 5 – Joris Karl Huysmans (Charles-Marie-Georges Huysmans), French novelist (died 1907)
- February 16 – Octave Mirbeau, French travel writer, novelist and playwright (died 1917)
- February 22 – Emily Selinger, American author, painter, and educator (died 1827)
- February 24 – Grant Allen, Canadian novelist and science writer (died 1899)
- March 9 – George Panu, Romanian memoirist, critic, and politician (died 1910)
- March 11 – Emma Pow Bauder, American novelist, evangelist, missionary, and reformer (died 1932)
- April 4 – Alice Williams Brotherton, American author of poetry, lyrics, essays, reviews, and children's stories (died 1930)
- April 20 — Kurd Lasswitz, author, physicist (died 1910)
- May – Bonifaciu Florescu, Wallachian and Romanian polygraph (died 1899)
- May 15 – Susanne Vandegrift Moore, American editor and publisher (died 1926)
- June 19 – Mary R. Platt Hatch, American author (died 1935)
- July 15 – Vilfredo Pareto, Italian economist, political scientist and philosopher (died 1923)
- August 14 – Mary E. Mann (Mary Rackham), English novelist and short story writer (died 1929)
- August 16 – Francis Darwin, English botanist and academic (died 1925)
- September 4 – Alice E. Bartlett, American author, novelist, essayist, lyricist (died 1920)
- October 25 – Karl Emil Franzos, Austrian novelist (died 1904)
- unknown date – Maryana Marrash, Syrian writer and salonist (died 1919 in literature)
- probable year – Bithia Mary Croker, Irish novelist (died 1920)

== Deaths ==
- January 19 – Isaac D'Israeli, English scholar and man of letters (born 1766)
- February 9 – Ann Batten Cristall, English poet (born 1769)
- February 13 – Sophie von Knorring, Swedish novelist (born 1797)
- July 4 – François-René de Chateaubriand, French historian, politician and diplomat (born 1768)
- July 6 – He Changling (賀長齡), Chinese scholar and writer on governance (born 1785)
- August 9 – Frederick Marryat (Captain Marryat), English novelist and children's writer (born 1792)
- September 24 – Branwell Brontë, English painter, writer and poet, brother of Emily, Charlotte and Anne (tuberculosis; born 1817)
- November 23 – John Barrow, English writer, geographer and linguist (born 1764)
- December 19 – Emily Brontë, English novelist and poet (tuberculosis, born 1818)
- December 23 – James Cowles Prichard, English ethnologist and psychiatrist
- Unknown date – Leyla Khanim, Turkish woman poet
