= 1848 in poetry =

Nationality words link to articles with information on the nation's poetry or literature (for instance, Irish or France).

== Events ==
- March 15 – Revolutions of 1848 in the Austrian Empire: Hungarian Revolution of 1848 – Hungarian poet Sándor Petőfi with Mihály Táncsics and other young men lead the bloodless revolution in Pest, reciting Petőfi's "Nemzeti dal" (National song) and the "12 points" and printing them on the presses of Landerer es Heckenast, forcing Ferdinand I of Austria to abolish censorship
- Pre-Raphaelite Brotherhood founded by Dante Gabriel Rossetti, William Holman Hunt, and John Everett Millais in England
- End of the Biedermeier era of German literature, which began in 1815. The name is derived from a parody in the Munich magazine Fliegende Blätter of 1848 by Ludwig Eichrodt and Dr. Adolph Kussmaul of two poems by Joseph Victor von Scheffel, "Biedermanns Abendgemütlichkeit" ("Biedermann's Evening Comfort") and "Bummelmaiers Klage" ("Bummelmaier's Complaint")

== Works published in English ==
=== United Kingdom ===
- Cecil Frances Alexander, The Baron's Little Daughter, and Other Tales in Prose and Verse
- William Edmondstoune Aytoun, Lays of the Scottish Cavaliers, Scotland
- John Stanyan Bigg, The Sea-King
- Arthur Hugh Clough, The Bothie of Tober-na-Vuolich: A Long-Vacation Pastoral
- Robert Davidson, Leaves from a Peasant's Cottage Drawer, Scotland
- Aubrey Thomas de Vere, English Misrule and Irish Deeds
- Dora Greenwell, Poems
- John Keats, Ode on Indolence first published, posthumously (the author died in 1821)
- Charles Kingsley, The Saint's Tragedy
- Walter Savage Landor, The Italics of Walter Savage Landor
- Monckton Milnes, Life, Letters and Literary Remains of John Keats

=== United States ===
- John Quincy Adams, Poems of Religion and Society
- Rufus Wilmot Griswold, Female Poets of America, anthology
- Henry Beck Hirst, Endymion
- James Russell Lowell:
  - The Biglow Papers (1848)
  - A Fable for Critics: A Glance at a Few of Our Literary Progenies, book-length poem published as a pamphlet
  - Poems: Second Series
  - The Vision of Sir Launfal
- Fitz-Greene Halleck, The Poetical Works of Fitz-Greene Halleck, Now First Collected, New York: D. Appleton & Company
- James Mathewes Legare, Orta-Undis, and Other Poems, the only book of poetry published in the author's lifetime; Boston: Ticknor and Company, printed at the author's expense
- Edgar Allan Poe, Eureka: A Prose Poem, United States
- Adrien Rouquette, Wild Flowers: Sacred Poetry
- William Gilmore Simms:
  - The Eye and the Wing, New York
  - Lays of the Palmetto: a Tribute to the South Carolina Regiment in the War with Mexico, Charleston
  - The Cassique of Accabee
  - Charleston and Her Satirists: A Scribblement
- William Ross Wallace, Alban the Pirate

== Works published in other languages ==
- José Bonifácio, Rosas e Goivos ("Roses and Cresses"), Brazil
- James Huston, editor, Le répertoire national, anthology of French Canadian poetry in four volumes, published from this year to 1850, including poetry by Joseph Mermet ("Les Boucheries: fêtes rurales du Canada"), Isidore Bédard ("Sol canadien, terre chérie"), François-Xavier Garneau, Napoléon Aubin, François-Magloire Derome and Pierre Chauveau
- Andreas Munch, Digte, gamle og nye, Norway
- Johan Ludvig Runeberg, The Tales of Ensign Stål (Swedish original title: Fänrik Ståls sägner, Finnish: Vänrikki Stoolin tarinat), first part, Finland

== Births ==
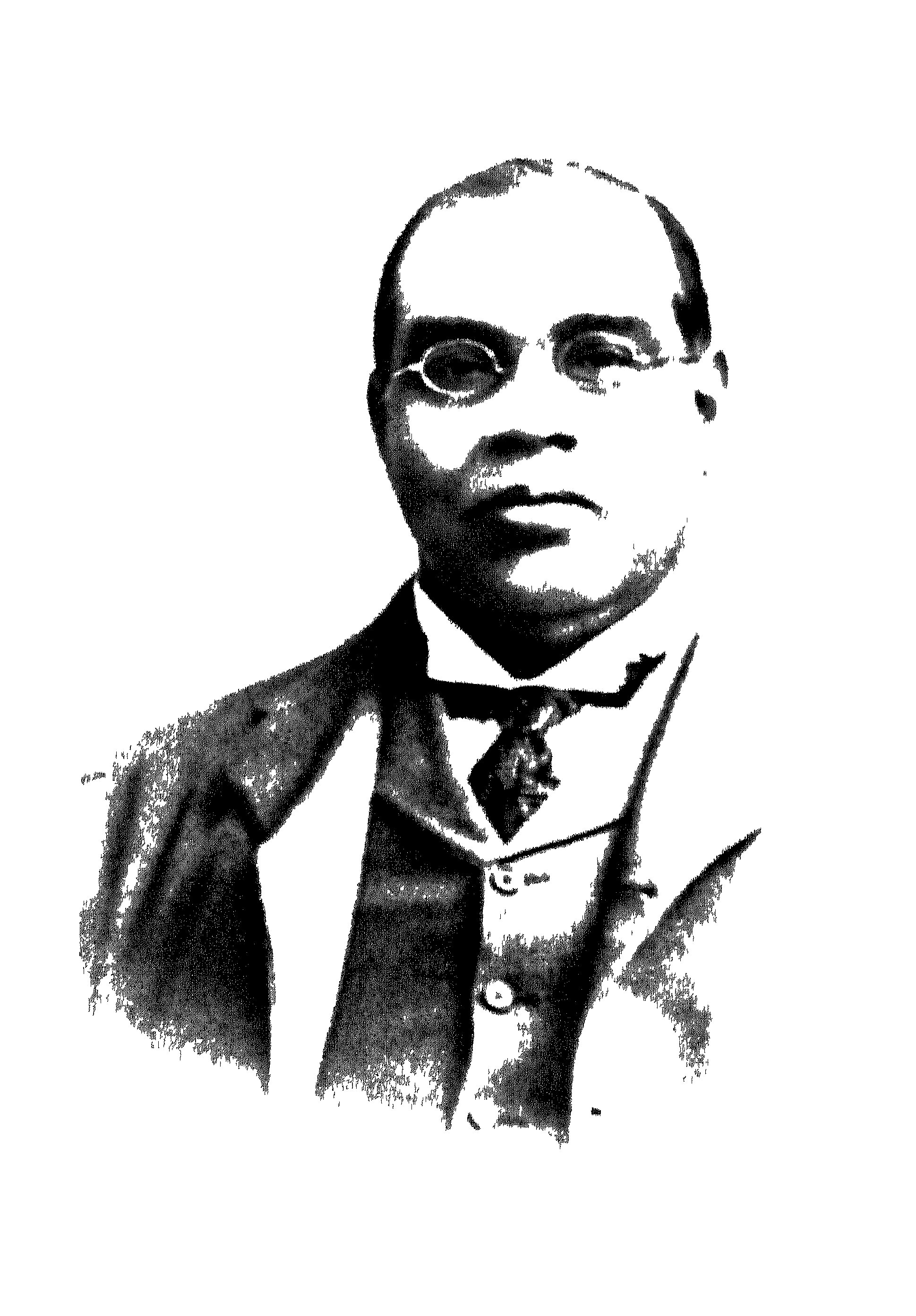
Romesh Chunder Dutt, born this year

Death years link to the corresponding "[year] in poetry" article:

- January 6 (December 25, 1847 O.S.) – Hristo Botev (killed 1876), Bulgarian revolutionary and poet
- February 17 – Louisa Lawson, née Albury (died 1920), Australian poet, writer, publisher and feminist; mother of Henry Lawson
- August 13 – Romesh Chunder Dutt (died 1909), Indian poet writing in English; cousin of Toru Dutt
- Undated – Gobinda Rath (died 1918), Indian, Oriya-language poet and satirist

== Deaths ==
Birth years link to the corresponding "[year] in poetry" article:

- January 19 – Isaac D'Israeli (born 1766), English scholar and man of letters
- February 11 – Thomas Cole (born 1801), English-born American landscape painter and occasional poet
- February 23 – John Quincy Adams (born 1767), American statesman, sixth President of the United States
- May 25 – Annette von Droste-Hulshoff (born 1797), German author and poet
- August 14 – Sarah Fuller Flower Adams (born 1805), English religious poet (tuberculosis)
- September 24 – Branwell Brontë (born 1817), English painter, writer and poet (tuberculosis)
- December 19 – Emily Brontë (born 1818), English novelist and poet (tuberculosis)
- Undated – Ann Batten Cristall (born c. 1769), English
- Undated – Leyla Khanim, Turkish woman poet

== See also ==
- 19th century in poetry
- 19th century in literature
- List of years in poetry
- List of years in literature
- Victorian literature
- French literature of the 19th century
- Biedermeier era of German literature
- Golden Age of Russian Poetry (1800–1850)
- Young Germany (Junges Deutschland) a loose group of German writers from about 1830 to 1850
- List of poets
- Poetry
- List of poetry awards
