= William Alexander (bishop) =

Irish bishop (1824-1911)

The Right Reverend William Alexander GCVO
- Archbishop of Armagh; Primate of All Ireland
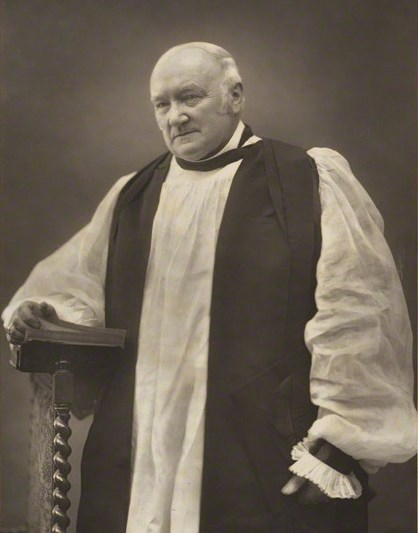
- Alexander c. 1890
- Church: Church of Ireland
- Diocese: Armagh
- Elected: 25 February 1896
- In office: 1896–1911
- Predecessor: Robert Gregg
- Successor: John Crozier
- Previous post: Bishop of Derry and Raphoe (1867–1896)

Orders
- Ordination: 1848 by Richard Ponsonby
- Consecration: 6 October 1867 by Marcus Beresford

Personal details
- Born: 13 April 1824 Derry, Ireland
- Died: 12 September 1911 (aged 87) Torquay, Devon, England
- Buried: Derry City Cemetery
- Denomination: Anglican
- Parents: Robert Alexander; Dorothea McClintock
- Spouse: Cecil Frances Alexander
- Children: 4
- Education: Tonbridge School; Brasenose College, Oxford

William Alexander GCVO (13 April 1824 – 12 September 1911) was an Irish cleric in the Church of Ireland.

== Life ==
He was born in Derry on 13 April 1824, the third child of the Revd Robert Alexander. He was educated at Tonbridge School and Brasenose College, Oxford. During his time in Oxford he came under the influence of the Oxford Movement. Due to illness his academic record failed to live up to his promise, but he nonetheless displayed a solid scholarship which was to stand him in good stead in later life.

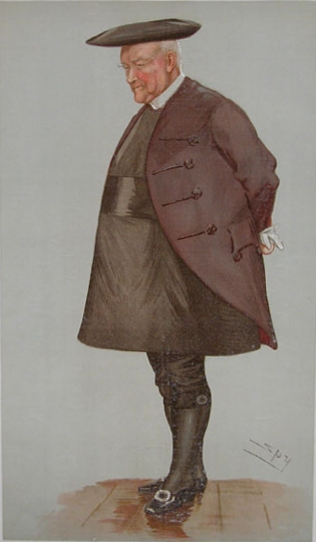
Alexander as caricatured by Spy (Leslie Ward) in Vanity Fair, November 1895

After holding several livings in Ireland, including the rectories of Fahan and later Camus-juxta-Mourne (Strabane), he was Dean of Emly from 1864 to 1867, resigning on becoming Bishop of Derry and Raphoe, to which see he was nominated on 27 July and consecrated on 6 October 1867. He and three of his brother bishops were the last bishops of Ireland to sit in the Westminster House of Lords before the disestablishment of the Church of Ireland in 1871 by the Irish Church Act 1869. On 25 February 1896 he was translated to become Archbishop of Armagh and Primate of All Ireland.

In the years 1871 to 1877 he was much involved in the reorganisation of the Church of Ireland and was one of the conservative voices, along with the primate, Marcus Beresford, Archbishop Trench, and Bishop John Gregg of Cork, that preserved the close identity of the Irish Book of Common Prayer with that of the Church of England. He did however regret some of the more aggressively anti-Ritualist provisions in the Irish canons, such as that prohibiting the placement of a cross upon the holy table. He gave the Bampton Lectures in 1876. An eloquent preacher and the author of numerous theological works, including Primary Convictions, he is best known as a master of dignified and animated verse. His poems were collected in 1887 under the title of St Augustine's Holiday and other Poems.

His wife, Cecil Frances Alexander, wrote some tracts in connection with the Oxford Movement. She is known as the author of many well-known hymns, including "Once in Royal David's City", "All Things Bright and Beautiful". They both lived in Milltown House, Strabane. The house is now used as a school, Strabane Grammar School. Their daughter, Eleanor Jane Alexander, was also a poet and novelist.

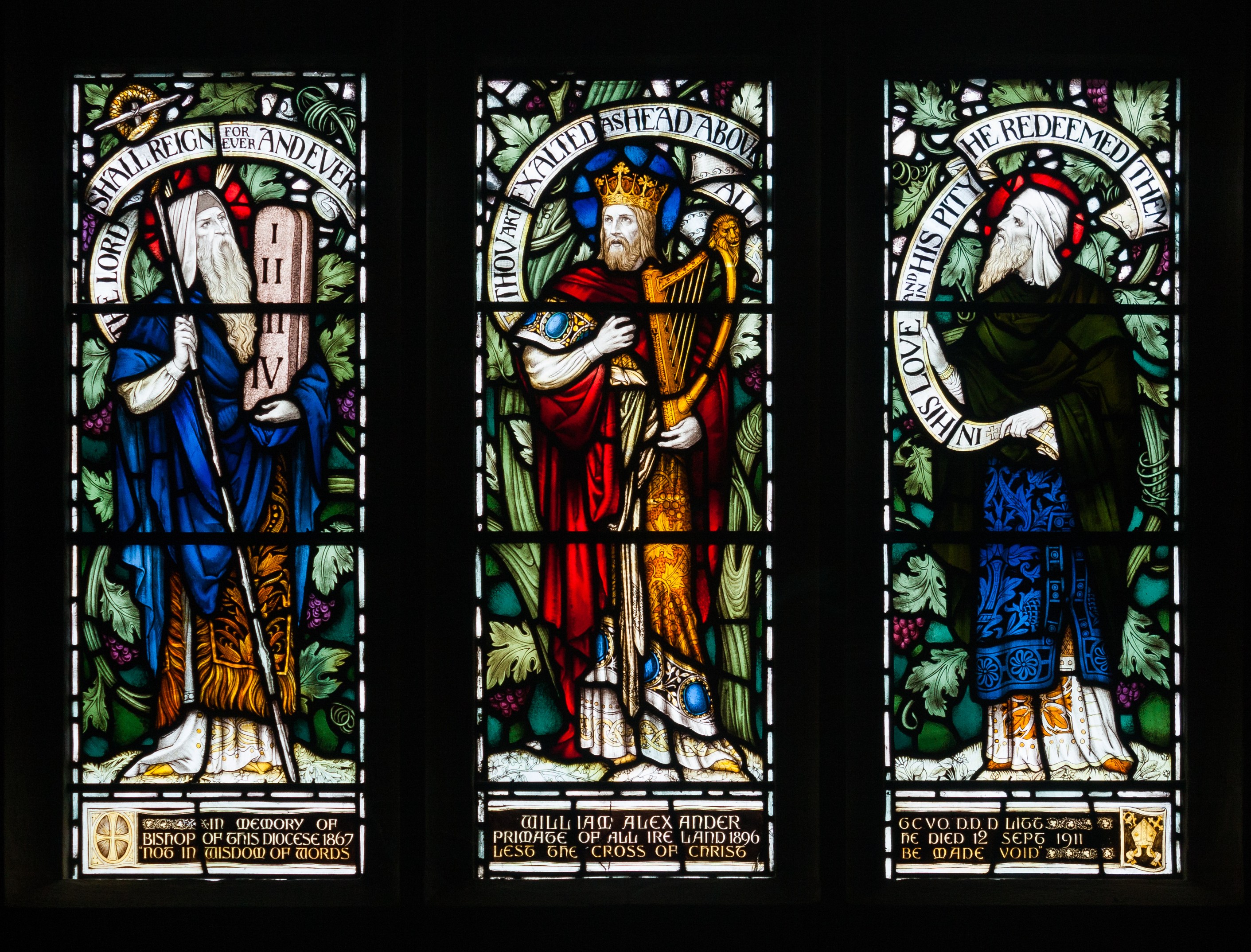
Lower lights of the stained glass window in memory of Alexander

In March 1913, a stained glass window by James Powell and Sons was erected in memory of him in the east wall of the side chapel of St Columb's Cathedral, financed by public subscription. The lower panels depict Moses, King David, and Isaiah in reference to his qualities as leader, poet, and preacher. His closing words of his resignation speech in February 1911 are quoted at the bottom: "Not in wisdom of words, lest the Cross of Christ be made void" (1 Cor 1:17).

There is a memorial to Alexander in the south aisle at St Patrick's Cathedral, Armagh.

== References in literature ==
Alexander is mentioned as part of the procession in James Joyce's "Circe" episode of Ulysses.

== Works ==
- Perils of home rule: a speech delivered at a meeting of the General Synod of the Church of Ireland, on Tuesday, 14 March. Dublin: The Irish Union Alliance. 1893.
