= Creggan, Derry =

Housing estate in Northern Ireland

Coordinates: 54°59′43″N 7°20′48″W

Creggan: Irish: An Creagán
- Housing estate
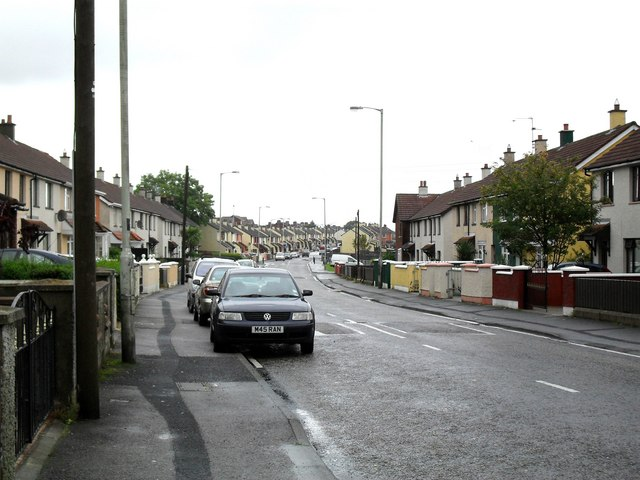
- Housing on Creggan Heights

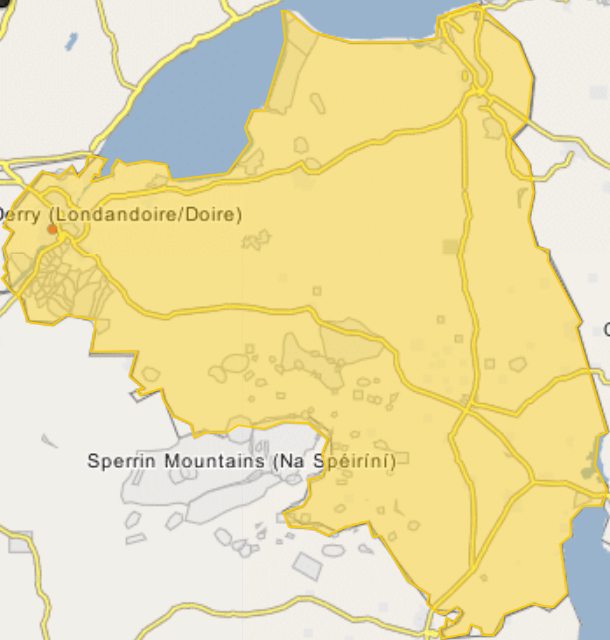
- Location within Northern Ireland
- District: Derry City and Strabane
- County: County Londonderry
- Country: Northern Ireland
- Sovereign state: United Kingdom
- Post town: LONDONDERRY
- Postcode district: BT48
- Dialling code: 028
- UK Parliament: Foyle
- NI Assembly: Foyle

Creggan (Irish: An Creagán; meaning stony place) is a large housing estate in Derry, Northern Ireland, on a hill not far from the River Foyle. It lies on the townlands of Ballymagowan and Edenballymore.

The estate is very close to the border with County Donegal in the Republic of Ireland.

== History ==
=== The Troubles ===
The civil rights movement that was occurring in Northern Ireland in the late 1960s took place consistently in Derry. This led to an outbreak of violence between the police, local Unionist Supporters and Nationalists. Violence in the city originally started in the Bogside but quickly spread out to the rest of the city, which included Creggan. One of these occurrences during 12 to 14 August 1969 became known as the Battle of the Bogside. A disagreement over defending Nationalists from British State forces and elements of Unionism led to a split in the IRA, and the two new paramilitary organizations became known as the Official IRA and Provisional IRA.

In the early years, 1969 to 1972, the Officials were the most prominent in Creggan and the rest of Northern Ireland with militant members carrying attacks out on the British Army, even though the Provisionals as a whole were carrying out a more violent campaign along with a bombing campaign in Derry City Centre. Following the introduction of internment without trial being carried out by the British government, as well as Civil Rights protests in Derry that turned into intense rioting with the Royal Ulster Constabulary (RUC), the Bogside and Creggan areas effectively became a no-go area for the British government along with the RUC and were only controlled and policed by both wings of the IRA. This all existed until Operation Motorman in July 1972. After this, the no-go area across Northern Ireland became fully controlled by the British government. By 1972, after Motorman, the British Army conducted large scale operations in the once no-go areas. It caused more open clashes between the British Army, the citizens of Creggan and the rest of Derry. This violence continued to occur up to the early 1990s.

=== Subsequent history ===
Creggan has experienced a seismic change; long gone are the no-go areas and levels of inequality suffered from the 1960s to 1980s. It has seen some redevelopment most noticeably with the redevelopment of the Bishop's Field as a sports and recreation area, the introduction of a play park and the development of a country park and fishery at the old reservoir sites at the edge of the estate.

New housing developments have also been completed on the edge of the estate, the largest of these being the new Ballymagowan area.

On 18 April 2019, 29-year-old journalist Lyra McKee was fatally shot during rioting in Fanad Drive. Police initially suggested the New IRA were responsible for the killing. The New IRA later confirmed responsibility and offered apologies.

== Education ==
=== Primary ===
- Holy Child Primary School
- St John's Primary School

=== Secondary ===
- St Cecilia's College
- St Joseph's Boys' School
- St. Mary's Girls School
- St. Peter's High School (closed in 2013)
- Lumen Christi College

== Places of interest ==
- City Cemetery – Derry's largest graveyard, opened in 1853. The site includes 194 Commonwealth war graves of those who died in the First and Second World Wars. The site also includes the republican section, which contains the graves Patsy O'Hara, Michael Devine, and Martin McGuinness.
- Creggan Country Park – recreation centre
- Bishop's Field – Astro-Turf pitch

== Notable people from Creggan ==
- Tony O'Doherty – international footballer, former Derry City F.C. player and manager
- Mickey Bradley – bass guitarist with The Undertones
- Liam Ball – Irish Olympic swimmer
- Dana – pop star, Ireland's first Eurovision song contest winner and politician
- Michael Devine – INLA member and participant in the 1981 hunger striker
- Don Mullan – author
- Charlie Nash – Former professional and Olympic boxer
- Raymond Gilmour – Member of the Provisional IRA and INLA that was an informer, and later a supergrass, for the RUC Special Branch
- Terry Harkin – international footballer
- James McClean – professional footballer with Derry City F.C.
- Darren Kelly – ex professional footballer and manager

== 2001 Census ==
Two wards in Derry have the name Creggan - Creggan Central and Creggan South. (A 3rd smaller ward in part of lower Creggan is 'Beechwood')

Creggan Central and South are classified by the Northern Ireland Statistics and Research Agency (NISRA) as being within Derry Urban Area (DUA). On Census day (29 April 2001) there were 3,504 people living in Creggan Central and 2,453 people living in Creggan South.

Of those living in Creggan Central:

- 34.1% were aged under 16 years and 9.1% were aged 90 and over
- 46.5% of the population were male and 53.5% were female
- 98.7% were from a Catholic background and 0.9% were from a Protestant background
- 12.5% of people aged 16 to 74 were unemployed

Of those living in Creggan South:

- 30.2% were aged under 16 years and 15.6% were aged 60 and over
- 45.6% of the population were male and 54.4% were female
- 98.8% were from a Catholic background and 0.9% were from a Protestant background
- 10.0% of people aged 16 to 74 were unemployed

== Deprivation ==
According to the Northern Ireland Multiple Deprivation Measure (NIMDM) of 2005, of 582 wards in Northern Ireland, Creggan Central was the 11th most deprived while Creggan South was ranked 15th.
