= Eleanor Jane Alexander =

Poet and novelist

- Born: 1857
- Died: 3 June 1939 (aged 81–82); Hampton Court Palace

Eleanor Jane Alexander MBE (1857 – 3 June 1939), was a poet and novelist, who was made a Member of the Order of the British Empire for her work during World War I.

== Life ==
Eleanor Jane Alexander was born in 1857 to Cecil Frances Humphreys and Rev. William Alexander, G.C.V.O., in Strabane, County Tyrone, Northern Ireland. Her father, who also wrote and published poetry, became Archbishop of Armagh and Primate of All Ireland. Her mother was also a poet and hymnwriter and died in 1895. Alexander had two brothers and a sister, including Robert Jocelyn Alexander, also a poet, who was killed when the RMS Leinster was torpedoed on 10 October 1918.

Alexander wrote for The Spectator, the Belfast Telegraph and The Times, and wrote Lady Anne's Walk, which was a miscellany of reflections based on the sketches of Lady Anne Beresford. She also wrote novels and biographies which detailed life in Ulster and recorded local dialects. She worked on a collection of humorous pieces at the start of World War I. Awarded her MBE for her hospital war work, she was also awarded the grade of Lady of Grace in the Order of Saint John.

Alexander lived with her father until he died in 1911. In honour of her father's work, she was granted permission to live in rooms in Prince Edward's Lodgings, Hampton Court Palace, by George V. She died on 3 June 1939 and is buried with her parents in Derry City Cemetery.

== Bibliography ==
- Lady Anne's Walk
- The Rambling Rector
- The Lady of the Well
- Primate Alexander: Archbishop of Armagh: A Memoir
