= Once in Royal David's City =

1848 Christmas carol

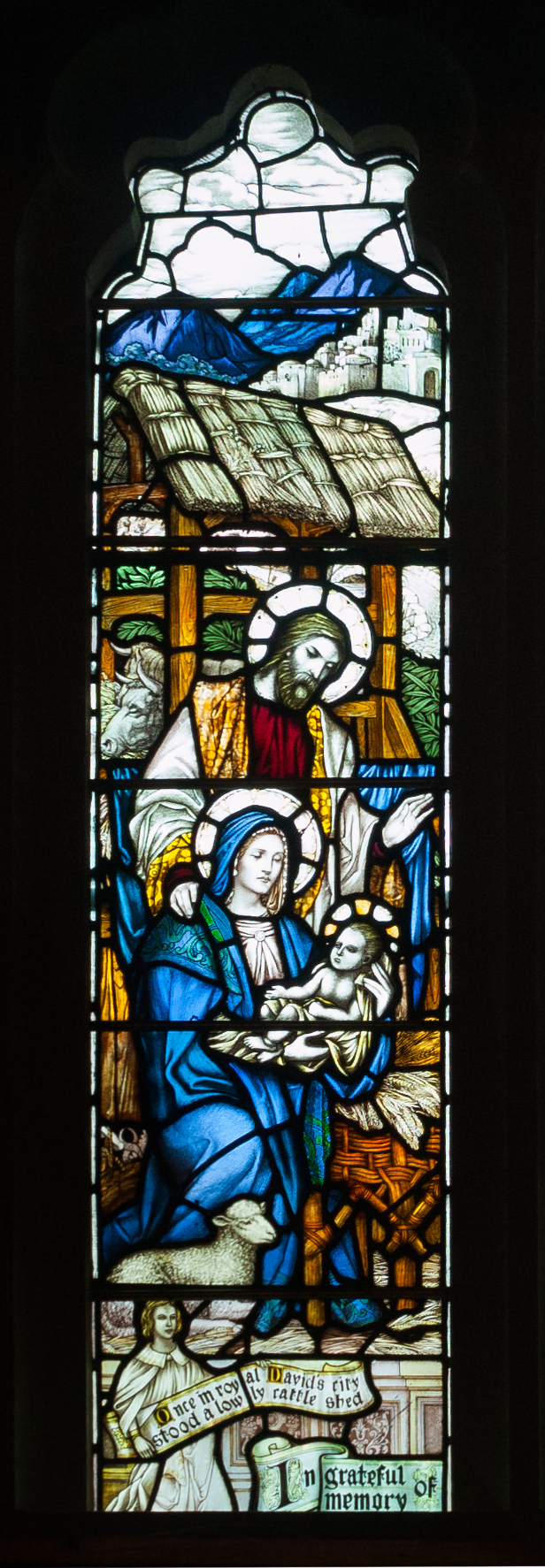
- Left light of the memorial window dedicated to Cecil F. Alexander in St Columb's Cathedral
- Genre: Hymn
- Occasion: Christmas
- Written: 1848
- Text: Cecil Frances Alexander
- Language: English
- Based on: Luke 2:4–7
- Meter: 8.7.8.7.7.7
- Melody: "Irby" by Henry Gauntlett

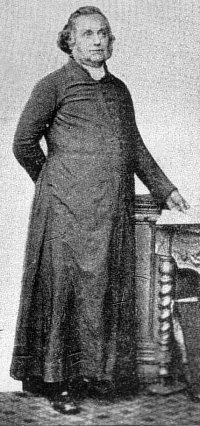
Henry John Gauntlett

Once in Royal David's City is a Christmas carol originally written as a poem by Cecil Frances Alexander. The carol was first published in 1848 in her hymnbook Hymns for Little Children. A year later, the English organist Henry Gauntlett discovered the poem and set it to music.

== History ==
Hymns for Little Children was a collection of poems aimed to elucidate parts of the Apostles' Creed for use in Sunday schools or in the home; "Once in Royal David's City" told the story of the nativity of Jesus to illuminate "born of the Virgin Mary". Other well-known hymns in the collection included "All Things Bright and Beautiful" (on the subject of "maker of Heaven and Earth") and "There is a green hill far away" (on "Was crucified dead and buried").

Alexander was married to the Anglican clergyman William Alexander, who became Bishop of Derry and Raphoe, and after her death became Archbishop of Armagh. Her most famous poems are commemorated in a memorial window at St Columb's Cathedral, Derry.

== Tune and modern usage ==
Henry John Gauntlett was organist at a number of London churches, including St Olave's in Tooley Street, Southwark from 1827 to 1846, Christ Church Greyfriars and Union Chapel, Islington from 1852 to 1861. He edited many hymnbooks and wrote more than a thousand hymn tunes, although his setting of "Once in Royal David's City" to the tune of "Irby" is his most famous.

Since 1919, the Festival of Nine Lessons and Carols at the King's College Chapel, Cambridge has begun its Christmas Eve service, with Dr Arthur Henry Mann's arrangement of "Once in Royal David's City" as the processional hymn. Mann was organist at King's between 1876 and 1929.

In Mann's arrangement, the first verse is sung by a boy chorister of the college's choir as a solo. The second verse is sung by the choir, and the congregation joins in the third verse. Excluding the first verse, the hymn is accompanied by the organ.

In The English Carol, Erik Routley notes that Mann's unaccompanied arrangement of Gauntlett's original hymn changes the character of the work into one which emphasises the acoustic space of the chapel: "with subtle art that arrangement turns the homely children's hymn into a processional of immense spaciousness."

According to the tradition of the King's College Choir, the soloist of this hymn is usually chosen right before the performance, when the choirmaster decides whose voice is the strongest on the day, prior to the start of the broadcast. The final verse is often accompanied by a soprano descant, most commonly the version written by David Willcocks and first published in Carols for Choirs 2.

This carol was the first recording that the King's College Choir under Boris Ord made for EMI in 1948.

== Text and melody ==
Once in royal David's city
Stood a lowly cattle shed,
Where a mother laid her baby
In a manger for his bed:
Mary was that Mother mild,
Jesus Christ her little Child.

He came down to earth from heaven
Who is God and Lord of all,
And his shelter was a stable,
And his cradle was a stall:
With the poor and mean and lowly,
Lived on earth our Saviour holy.

And through all His wondrous childhood
He would honour and obey,
Love and watch the lowly maiden,
In whose gentle arms He lay:
Christian children all must be
Mild, obedient, good as He.

For he is our childhood's pattern;
Day by day like us he grew,
He was little, weak, and helpless,
Tears and smiles like us he knew:
And he feeleth for our sadness,
And he shareth in our gladness.

And our eyes at last shall see him
Through his own redeeming love,
For that Child so dear and gentle,
Is our Lord in heaven above:
And he leads his children on
To the place where he is gone.

Not in that poor lowly stable,
With the oxen standing by,
We shall see him: but in heaven,
Set at God's right hand on high,
Where like stars his children crowned,
All in white shall wait around.

== See also ==
- List of Christmas carols
