= James Huston =

James Huston may refer to:

- James Huston (typographer) (1820–1854), Canadian typographer, journalist and author
- James Huston (Canadian politician) (1845–1922), politician in Manitoba, Canada
- James N. Huston (1849–1927), U.S. Treasurer
- James W. Huston (mayor), former mayor of Boise in Idaho Territory
- James W. Huston (author) (1953–2016), American author and lawyer

== See also ==
- James Archibald Houston (1921–2005), Canadian artist, designer, children's author and film-maker
- Jim Houston (1937–2018), former American football player
