= Michael Devine (hunger striker) =

Irish hunger striker (1954–1981)

- Mícheál Ó Daimhín

Personal details
- Born: Michael James Devine; 26 May 1954 Springtown Camp, Derry, Northern Ireland
- Died: 20 August 1981 (aged 27) HM Prison Maze, County Down, Northern Ireland
- Cause of death: Died after 60 days on hunger strike
- Party: Irish Republican Socialist Party (1974–1981) Republican Clubs (1971–1974) Irish Labour Party (1970–1971)
- Children: 2
- Nickname: Red Mickey

Military service
- Paramilitary: Irish National Liberation Army (1975–1981); Official Irish Republican Army (1971–1975)
- Battles/wars: The Troubles

Michael James Devine (Irish: Mícheál Ó Daimhín; 26 May 1954 – 20 August 1981) was an Irish militant and Republican activist. He was a volunteer in the Irish National Liberation Army (INLA), and the last hunger striker to die during the 1981 Irish hunger strike.

== Background ==
Devine, also known as Red Mickey because of his red hair, was born into a family from the Springtown Camp, Derry, Northern Ireland.

In 1960, when Devine was six years of age, the Devine family including his grandmother, sister Margaret and parents Patrick and Elizabeth, moved to the then newly built Creggan estate to the north of Derry city centre. Devine was educated at Holy Child Primary School and St. Joseph's Secondary School, both in the Creggan.

== Political activities ==
In the early 1970s, Devine joined the Irish Labour Party and Young Socialists. In July 1971, soldiers from the Royal Anglian Regiment fired into a crowd of approximately 70 people stoning them, fatally wounding two civilians, Dessie Beattie and Seamus Cusack. After this incident, Devine joined the James Connolly branch of the Republican Clubs in Derry. The events of Bloody Sunday on 30 January 1972 had a deep impact on Devine. In 1974, he was a founding member of the Irish Republican Socialist Party.

== Paramilitary activity ==
Devine, through Republican Clubs, joined the Official IRA in 1971. Unhappy with the path taken by the leadership of the Official IRA, Devine helped found the INLA in 1975. On 20 September 1976, after an arms raid in County Donegal of the Republic of Ireland, Devine was arrested along with Desmond Walmsley and John Cassidy in Lifford, County Donegal. He was charged with the theft of rifles, shotguns and possession of 3,000 rounds of ammunition. On 20 July 1977 Devine was convicted and sentenced to 12 years in prison. He joined the blanket protest before joining the hunger strike.

== Hunger strikes ==
Devine participated in a brief hunger strike in 1980, which was called off without fatalities. On 22 June 1981, Devine joined the 1981 hunger strike at the Maze Prison. He became the INLA prisoners' Officer Commanding in Maze Prison when his friend and comrade Patsy O'Hara began his hunger strike.

Devine died on 20 August 1981 after 60 days on hunger strike, being the tenth and last of the hunger strikers to die. The funeral took place two days later, on 22 August, in his native city of Derry. He was buried in a grave next to Patsy O'Hara, who died three months before. After the Requiem offered in St Mary's chapel, the funeral took place from Devine's sister's home, in Rathkeele Way, to the cemetery.

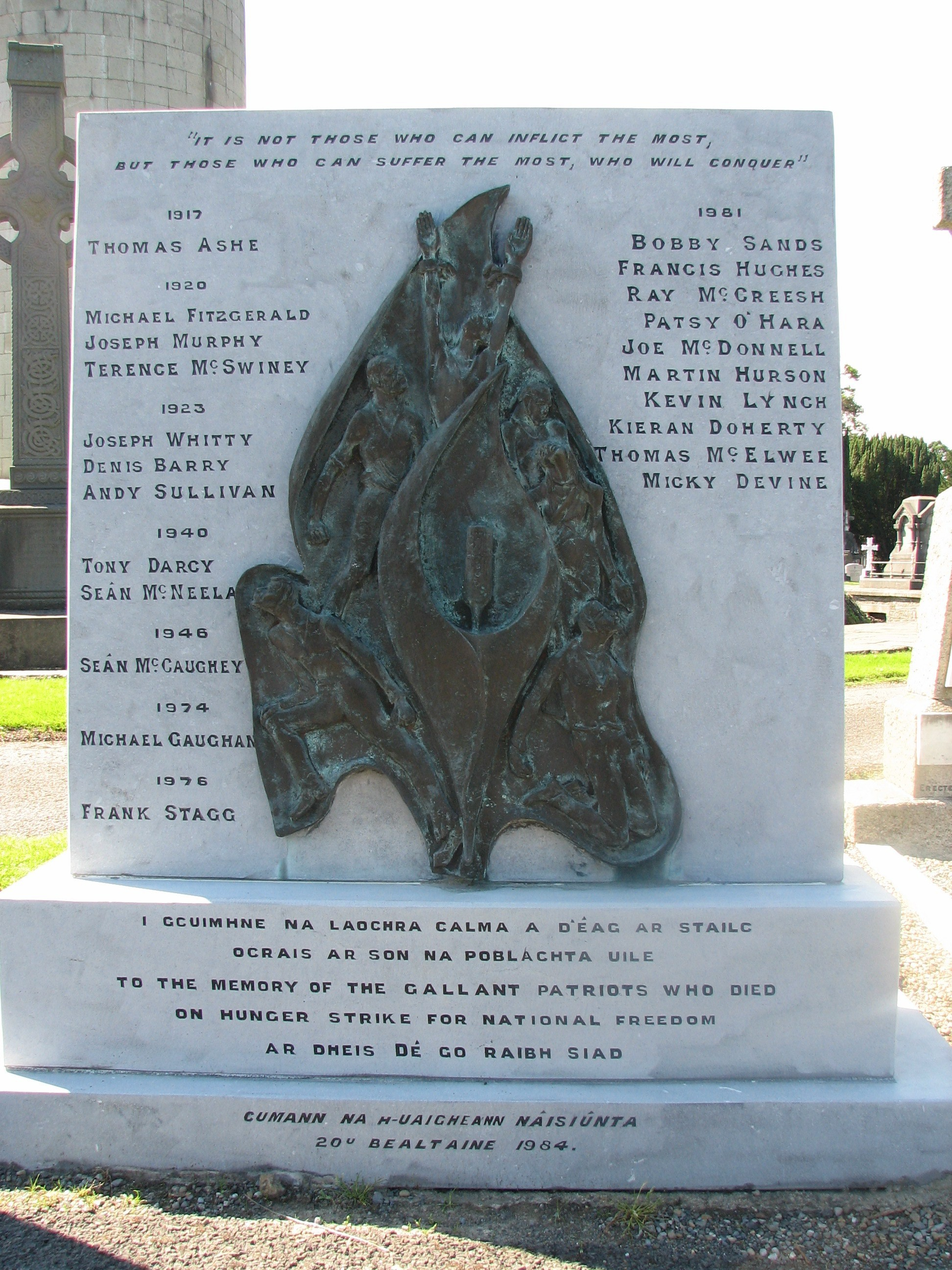
Hunger Strikers Memorial Glasnevin Cemetery Dublin
