= There is a green hill far away =

Christian hymn

- Christian hymn
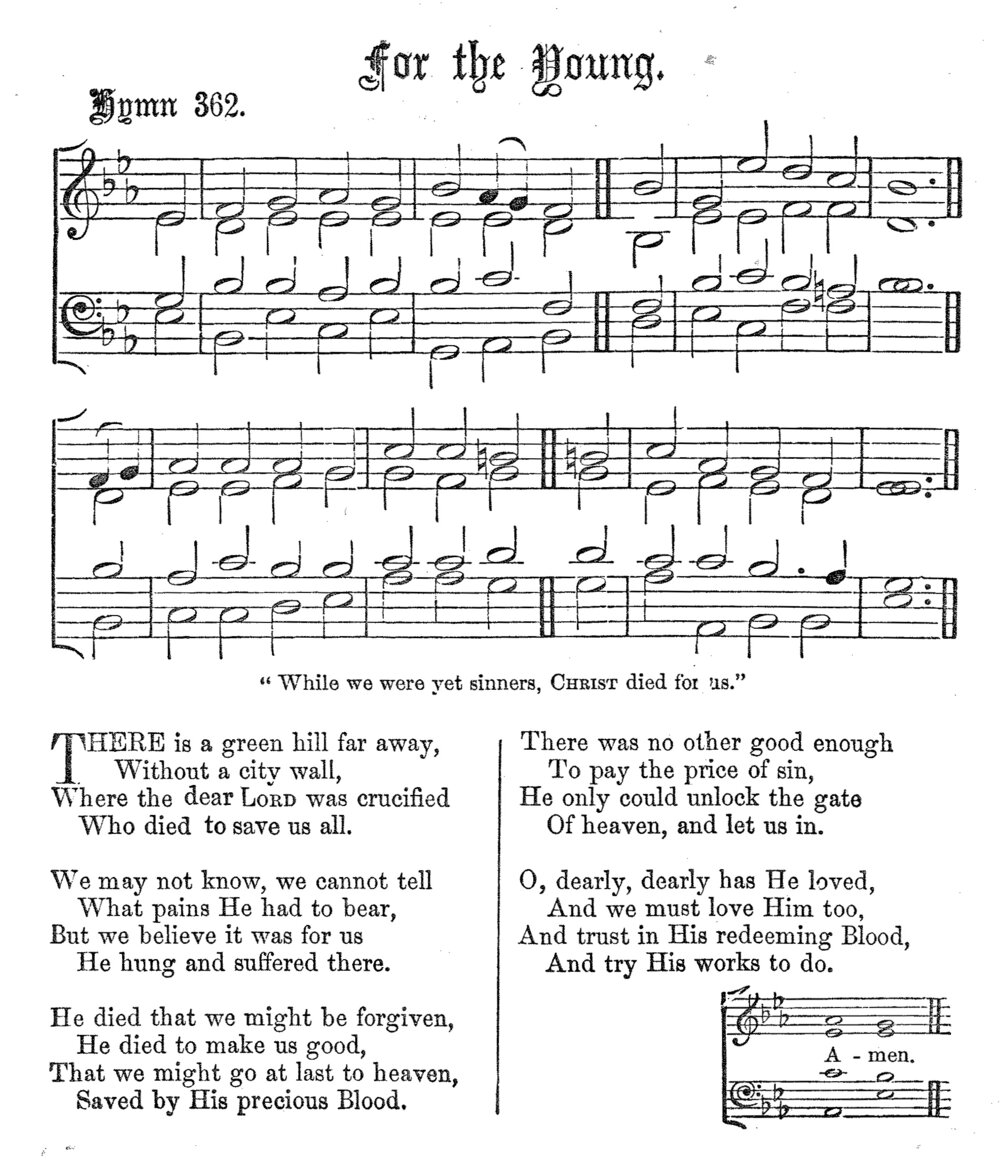
- The hymn as it appears in the 1868 appendix to Hymns Ancient and Modern
- Genre: Hymn
- Occasion: Passiontide
- Text: by Cecil Frances Alexander
- Language: English
- Meter: C.M. (86.86)
- Melody: "Horsley"

"There is a green hill far away" is a Christian hymn, originally written as a children's hymn but now usually sung for Passiontide. The words are by Cecil Frances Alexander, and the most popular tune by William Horsley.

== History ==
The text was first published in Hymns for Little Children (1848), and the profound but simple text reflects well on this original purpose. The hymn would become popular after its publication in the 1868 appendix to the first edition of Hymns Ancient and Modern, paired with the tune "Horsley". The writer's husband, William Alexander, considered it among the best of those written by his wife, with later assessments agreeing on the matter, one early 20th century noting the fine poetic skill of the poet and proclaiming that "she surpassed all other writers of sacred song in meeting a growing demand for children's hymns". French composer Charles Gounod, who composed a musical setting on the hymn's text in 1871, reportedly considered that it was "the most perfect hymn in the English language", due in part to its striking simplicity.

Despite the apparent simplicity, the text remains well known today due to its "clear presentation of the redemptive work of Christ". It appeared in later influential publications such as The English Hymnal (1906) and remains popular to this day, appearing in most compilations, scholar John Richard Watson noting that, since the time of its first publication, "it would be hard to find a major hymn book that has not included it".

== Text ==
The text is in five common metre stanzas. It is based upon the words "Suffered under Pontius Pilate, was crucified, dead, and buried," of the Apostles' Creed, and is an example of a metric paraphrase of the Creed where each article is extended to form a complete hymn. It can be summarised as a "touching" description of Christ dying for the sins of men and giving his "redeeming blood" to "save us all".

The first stanza refers to Golgotha (Calvary). According to legend, the author often went past a "green hill" when walking from her home to Derry, and she might have associated this with the distant – both physically and temporally – location of the Crucifixion. "Without" in the second line is usually taken to mean "outside", and some hymnals make this change explicitly. The final line refers to passages such as 1 John 2 and Isaiah 53:6. The second stanza speaks of the mystery of the cross and of atonement through the sacrifice of Christ, based on Isaiah 53:5 and 2 Corinthians 5:21.

The third stanza talks of the forgiveness of sin (cf. Hebrews 9:22, Ephesians 1:6–7), through which Man is made good (2 Cor 5:17), framing this as the gateway to Heaven, an imagery continued in the fourth stanza.

The final stanza is a fitting emotional conclusion to the text, and the repetition of the word "dearly" here refers has a double meaning: "that Christ loved mankind dearly, and in a way that cost Him dearly". The concluding line is a clear call to the Biblical instruction to "love the Lord your God with all your heart and with all your soul and with all your might" (Deuteronomy 6:5).

There is a green hill far away,
Without a city wall,
Where the dear Lord was crucified
Who died to save us all.

We may not know, we cannot tell,
What pains he had to bear,
But we believe it was for us
He hung and suffered there.

He died that we might be forgiven,
He died to make us good;
That we might go at last to heaven,
Saved by his precious Blood.

There was no other good enough
To pay the price of sin;
He only could unlock the gate
Of heaven, and let us in.

O dearly, dearly has he loved,
And we must love him too,
And trust in his redeeming Blood,
And try his works to do.

== Tune ==
The most common tune is "Horsley", named after its author, William Horsley. It was first published as a four-part setting with figured bass in collection Twenty Four Psalm Tunes and Eight Chants (London: Addison & Hodson, 1844). The original harmonisation was kept in the 1868 Hymns Ancient and Moderns publication, and has endured ever since. The following setting is transcribed from The English Hymnal (1906):

In the United States, the hymn is also frequently sung to the tune "Green Hill" by gospel composer George C. Stebbins. It was originally intended as a setting for the hymn's text and published in Gospel Hymns No. 3 (Chicago: Biglow & Main, 1878). This setting uses the final stanza as a refrain. In mostly step-wise melodic motion, it features a slow harmonic rhythm which eventually leads to a summit in the final line.

Another alternative is "Meditation" by John H. Gower, published in An Evening Service Book for Evensong, Missions, Sunday Schools, Family Prayer, etc. (Denver: Denver Music Pub., 1891) where it is set to both this text and "There is a fountain filled with blood" by William Cowper.
