= Strabane Grammar School =

Location
- Milltown House, Liskey Road; Strabane, County Tyrone; Northern Ireland; 54.812°N 7.457°W

Information
- Type: Controlled
- Established: 1956
- Closed: 2011
- Headmaster: Lewis Lacey
- Gender: Co-educational
- Enrolment: 400
- Colours: Royal blue, white (Sixth form – royal blue, blue)
- Main sports: Rugby union, cricket, hockey, football
- Website: http://www.strabanegs.co.uk/

Strabane Grammar School was a grammar school located just outside Strabane, County Tyrone, Northern Ireland. It was within the Western Education and Library Board area. As part of the 2020 scheme, the school was officially shut down on 30 June 2011 to join with Strabane High School, to create Strabane Academy.

== Location ==
The school was located on 23 acres (93,000 m^{2}) of wooded grounds at Milltown House just outside Strabane. It overlooked the River Mourne to the south of the town.

== History ==
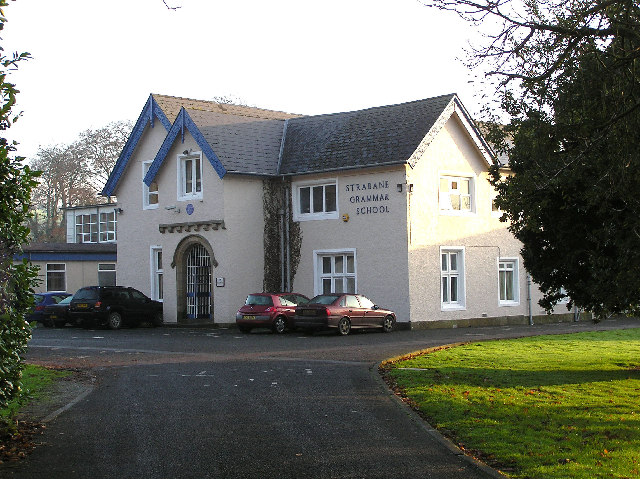
Milltown House

The main school building, Milltown House, was built in 1887 and for a time was the residence of hymn-writer and poet Mrs. Cecil Frances Alexander, best known for her hymn "All Things Bright and Beautiful". Milltown House was used as the headmasters study, the reception, a history room, a staff room, an IT suite and two English rooms.

== Future Plans ==
Having lain derelict for too many years, the site is in jeopardy of terminal decline, or being sold off by the current owners (the Education Authority) to the highest bidder. An effort is underway, led by several community groups to secure the historic site and repurpose it for community purposes. One such group is Strabane Rugby Football Club who have never had a permanent ground, though they played on this site for a spell until it closed.

== Notable alumni ==
- Sarah Friar
- Stephen Ogilby
- William Porterfield
- Boyd Rankin
- Sharon Wauchob
