= Milltown House =

Historical building in Northern Ireland

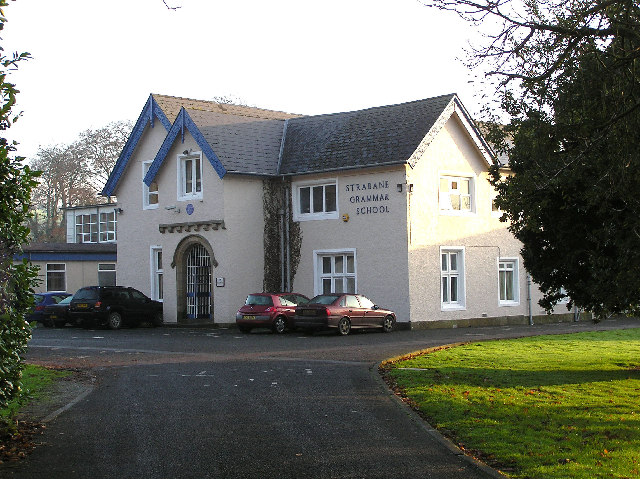
- Milltown House, Strabane Grammar School, November 2005

- Location within Ireland

General information
- Architectural style: Neoclassical style
- Location: Townsend Street, Strabane, County Tyrone, Strabane, Northern Ireland
- Coordinates: 54°48′52″N 7°27′15″W
- Completed: 1836
- Client: Major John Humphreys
- Owner: Education Authority

Design and construction
- Architect: William Vitruvius Morrison

Milltown House is a historic building in Strabane, County Tyrone, Northern Ireland.

The two-storey gabled cottage-style house and gate lodge was constructed in c. 1836 for Major John Humphreys (father of Cecil Frances Alexander), agent to the 2nd Marquess of Abercorn (later created, in 1868, the 1st Duke of Abercorn), and was designed by William Vitruvius Morrison. At the age of fifteen, Irish hymn-writer and poet, Cecil Frances Alexander, moved into Milltown House, with her family. While living there she wrote and had published a number of books, verses and hymns.

The building was the former site of Strabane Grammar School, and during the transition to Strabane Academy at their new building on the High School site, functioned as the Sixth Form College. It has been vacant since January 2020. In July that year it was subject to an arson attack and suffered substantial damage. The building was further damaged by another fire in August 2025.

== Preservation campaign ==
In 2022 the Education Authority resolved to sell the 8.9 ha (22 acres) site, including Milltown House. A public campaign is building to preserve the building and repurpose the site for community use. The Derry City and Strabane District Council has resolved to request the Authority preserve the historic building and examine the possibility of transferring it as a community asset.
