= Sarah Friar =

Irish-American business executive (born 1972)

Sarah Friar OBE
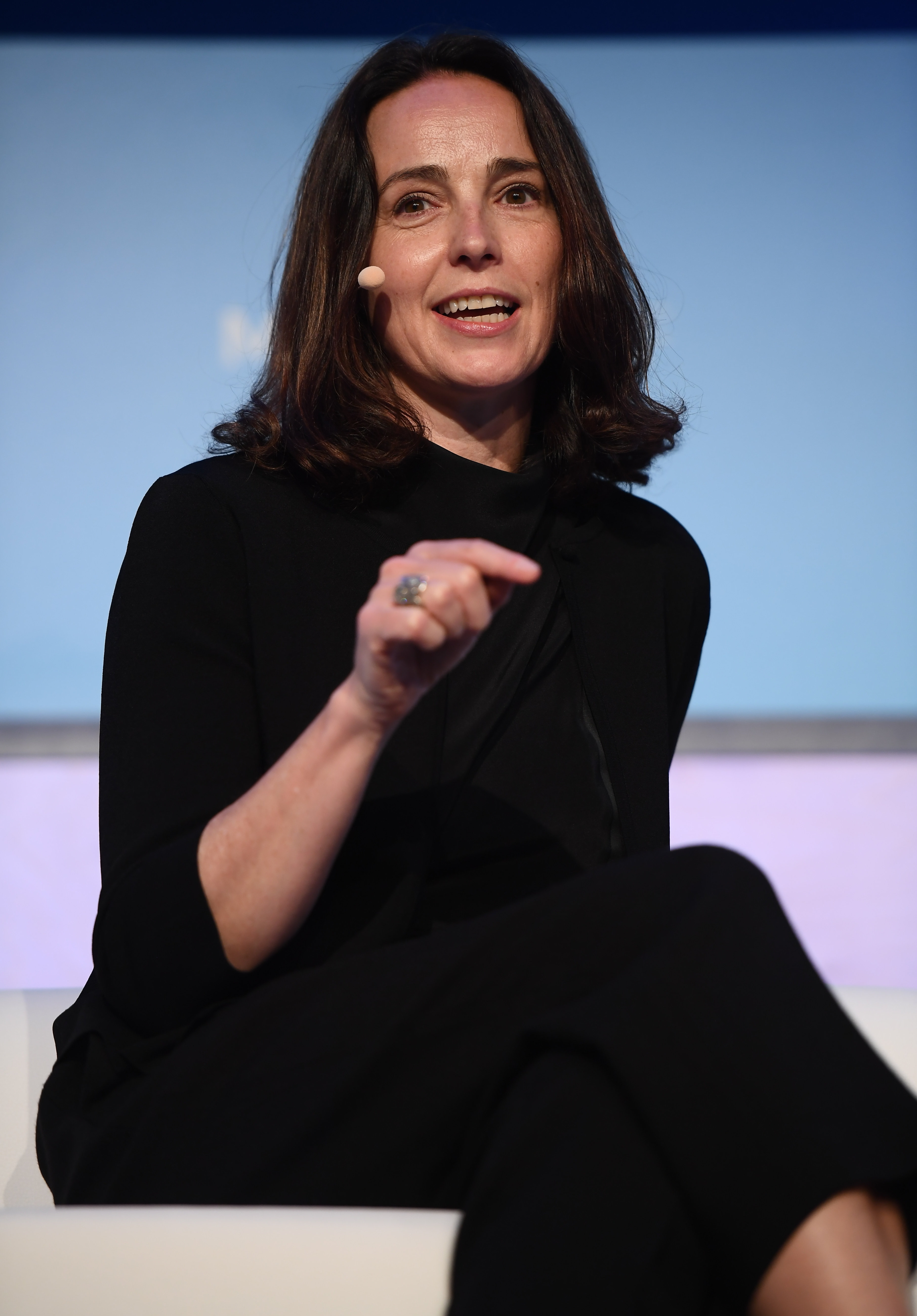
- Friar in 2018
- Born: Sarah Jane Friar; 24 December 1972 (age 53); Sion Mills, County Tyrone, Northern Ireland
- Education: St Anne's College, Oxford (MEng); Stanford University (MBA)
- Occupation: Business executive
- Known for: CFO of OpenAI
- Children: 2

Sarah Jane Friar OBE (born 24 December 1972) is a British-Irish and American business executive, who has been the chief financial officer (CFO) of OpenAI since June 2024. She was the chief executive officer of American technology company Nextdoor from 2018 to 2024 and the CFO of Block, Inc. (formerly Square, Inc.) from 2012 to 2018.

== Early life ==
Born in 1972, Friar grew up in the town of Sion Mills in Northern Ireland. She attended Strabane Grammar School. Friar won a scholarship from the accounting firm Arthur Andersen after entering a competition; she then worked there for a year before pursuing engineering studies at University of Oxford. She studied metallurgy, economics, and management at Oxford, and then completed an MBA from Stanford Graduate School of Business where she was an Arjay Miller scholar. Friar interned at Ashanti Goldfields in 1990s, during which she was assigned to work at a gold mine in Ghana.

== Career ==
Friar worked as an analyst for McKinsey & Company in South Africa, a managing director in equity research at Goldman Sachs, and a senior vice president of finance and strategy at Salesforce before becoming chief financial officer at Square in 2012. She then joined Nextdoor, a hyperlocal social networking service for neighborhoods, as CEO in 2018. Friar led the company public through a special-purpose acquisition company in 2021. Nextdoor announced Friar would step down as CEO in mid-2024. In June 2024, she joined OpenAI, the artificial intelligence research organization that develops ChatGPT, as its first CFO.

Friar is on the boards of Walmart and ConsenSys, and previously sat on the boards of Slack Technologies and New Relic's boards. She also co-chairs Stanford's Digital Economy Lab and runs Ladies Who Launch, a non-profit focused on female entrepreneurs that she co-founded.

She received an honorary doctorate from Ulster University in 2018. In 2019, she was granted an Order of the British Empire from Queen Elizabeth II for her commitment to entrepreneurship and financial services.

== Personal life ==
Friar is married to David Riley, a former hedge fund partner. The couple has a daughter and son. She lives in Marin County, California. She was also named on Time's list of the 100 most influential people in the world in 2026.
