= Raymond Gilmour =

Irish spy (1959–2016)

- Born: 1959; Derry, Northern Ireland
- Died: October 2016 (aged 56 or 57); Kent, England
- Occupations: Undercover agent in INLA/IRA; author
- Known for: Successful infiltration of the INLA and Provisional IRA

Raymond Gilmour (1959 – October 2016) was an Irish National Liberation Army (INLA) and Provisional Irish Republican Army (IRA) volunteer who worked clandestinely from 1977 to 1982 for the Royal Ulster Constabulary (RUC) within those paramilitary organisations. His testimony was a main element of the supergrass policy, which was aimed at convicting large numbers of paramilitaries.

== Early life ==
He was born in 1959 into a working class Catholic, nationalist family in Creggan, Derry to Patrick and Brigid Gilmour, the youngest of eleven siblings and grew up as The Troubles began in Derry in the early 1970s.

A cousin, Hugh Gilmour (usually spelt "Gilmore"), was shot dead by the British Army on Bloody Sunday, a seminal event in the development of the "Troubles" and a traumatic event witnessed by the 12-year-old Gilmour himself. His parents were reportedly split over the issue of political violence. He described his father as an "armchair supporter" of the IRA, while his mother was reportedly fiercely opposed to their actions.

Two of Gilmour's brothers were kneecapped by the IRA for alleged anti-social behaviour. He was also given a beating by British soldiers at age 13 for petty crime and they attempted to recruit him as an informer.

He left school without sitting for his O Level exams and drifted into crime. When he was 16, he was again in trouble with the authorities, this time for armed robbery. On remand in Crumlin Road Prison, he was severely beaten by IRA prisoners. It was at this point that he apparently agreed to become an undercover agent for British security forces.

== INLA member ==
Several months later, he joined the INLA. He chose the INLA over the IRA as a number of his friends were already in the organisation. Gilmour participated in, among other activities, a botched car hijacking in which a friend, Colm McNutt, also an INLA member, was shot dead by an undercover soldier. In 1978, after two years with the INLA as an RUC agent, he left on police instructions. He got married the same year and fathered the first of two children.

== IRA career ==
After an interlude of several months, Gilmour was instructed by his RUC handler to join the IRA. He was offered £200 a week with bonuses for arrests and weapons finds. The IRA vetted him for several weeks before accepting his application in late 1980. They attached him to an active service unit in the Brandywell area of Derry. Over the following two years, he was involved in many IRA operations, mostly as a getaway driver.

Most of these operations were "shoots" or sniping attacks, but on only one occasion, in January 1981, did his activities result in the death of a British soldier who was shot and killed at Castle Gate, near Derry's city walls. Gilmour claimed that he helped to foil many other IRA attacks, saving the lives of numerous police officers and soldiers.

In November 1981, he was arrested by the RUC, along with two other IRA members, on their way to carry out a shooting attack on riot police, who were combating disturbances arising out of the 1981 Irish Hunger Strike. Gilmour was sent on remand to Crumlin Road Prison. After a riot that destroyed much of the republican wing there, he was transferred to the Maze Prison. His RUC handler then applied pressure on the authorities for his release, he was freed on 1 April 1982.

== Supergrass ==
He left the IRA and went into protective custody in August of that year, as he believed that his position in the IRA was about to be discovered after his information led to the capture of an M60 machine gun. Around 100 IRA and INLA members were then arrested in Derry on his evidence, of whom 35 were charged with terrorist offences.

In November, Gilmour's father was abducted by the IRA. He was held in secret in an unknown location for almost a year. Gilmour was then sent to Cyprus and then Newcastle by the RUC. The following year, Gilmour gave evidence in a special Diplock Court, jury-less trial against the 35 people he had incriminated. Under the "supergrass" scheme, his was the only evidence available against them.

On 18 December 1984, the presiding judge, Lord Lowry, ruled that Gilmour was not a credible witness. He said he was "entirely unworthy of belief ... a selfish and self-regarding man, to whose lips a lie comes more naturally than the truth".

== Exile and plea to return home ==
After the trial, Gilmour was in hiding outside Northern Ireland. He states that of the IRA and INLA members he knew, almost half were dead or missing by the end of the conflict. In 1998, he published a book, Dead Ground: Infiltrating the IRA, telling of his experiences.

In 2007, Gilmour publicly voiced his desire to return home to Derry, asking Martin McGuinness for assurances of his safety. Gilmour said he was suffering from a heart ailment and was an alcoholic. McGuinness said Gilmour had to decide for himself if it was safe to return and whether or not he was under threat. McGuinness stated that if de facto exiles such as Gilmour wanted to return home, it was a matter for their own judgment and their ability to make peace with the community.

Gilmour's former RUC handler advised him not to return, citing the 2006 murder in Glenties, County Donegal, of Denis Donaldson, a high-ranking Sinn Féin politician and activist who was revealed to have been a long-term informer.

In April 2014, Gilmour's second book, What Price Truth, was published, in which Gilmour went into greater detail about his life within the IRA and INLA.

== Death ==
On 27 October 2016, Gilmour was found dead in his flat in Kent, where he had lain dead for up to a week. He was reportedly an alcoholic with serious psychological problems.

Following his death, Gilmour's friend, Martin McGartland, also a British spy who had infiltrated the IRA, and who survived a serious assassination attempt, said, "It is disgraceful that Ray died in these circumstances. He spent years begging MI5 for financial and psychological help. Instead, they turned their back on him. He was a broken man, a wreck of a human being, and they left him to die in the gutter." He was survived by his two children, from whom he was estranged, as well as a large extended family.
