= William Horsley =

English musician

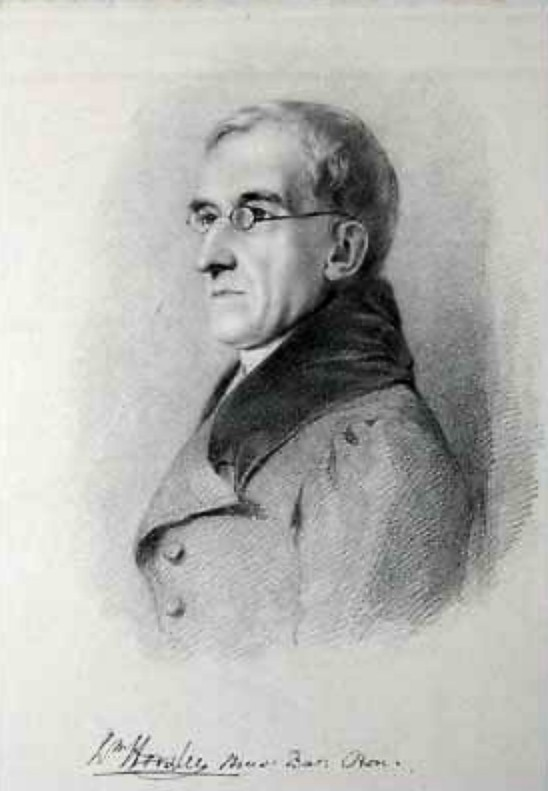
- William Horsley (1832) by Richard James Lane
- Born: 18 November 1774
- Died: 12 June 1858 (aged 83)
- Children: Charles Edward Horsley; John Calcott Horsley

William Horsley (18 November 1774 – 12 June 1858) was an English composer, organist and teacher.

== Career ==
In 1790, Horsley became the pupil of the pianist and composer Theodore Smith (c. 1740–1810), who taught him sufficiently well to obtain the position of organist at Ely Chapel, Holborn, in 1794. He resigned this post in 1798 to become the organist at the Asylum for Female Orphans as well as the assistant to John Wall Callcott, with whom he had long been on terms of personal and artistic intimacy, and whose eldest daughter, Elizabeth Hutchins Callcott, he married. Callcott encouraged his interest in vocal music. In 1802 he became his friend's successor upon the latter's resignation. Besides holding this appointment he became the organist of Belgrave Chapel, Halkin Street, in 1812 and of London Charterhouse in 1838.

Horsley spent time studying in Germany, where he met Moritz Hauptmann and Robert Schumann, and he first met Felix Mendelssohn on his visit to London in 1829 and remained friends with him. Horsley was one of the founders of the Philharmonic Society of London, which became the Royal Philharmonic Society.

== Music ==
His compositions were numerous, and include amongst other instrumental pieces three symphonies for full orchestra (now lost). There are five surviving piano sonatas, composed between 1812 and 1817, of which Nicholas Temperley and Leanne Langley particularly highlight No. 2 of 1814. More important are his glees, of which he published five books (1801–1807) besides contributing many detached glees and part songs to various collections. His glees include "By Celia's Arbour," "O, Nightingale," and "Now the storm begins to lower". His ballads, particularly Gentle Lyre and The Sailor’s Adieu enjoyed popularity in his lifetime. Two of his hymn tunes, 'Belgrave' (1819) and 'Horsley' (1844), the latter (usually set to There is a green hill far away), are still in use today.

== Family ==
The Horsley family were friendly with Mendelssohn and, according to L T C Rolt, were the first to hear his music for A Midsummer Night's Dream, played by him on the piano at their home at No 1 High Row (now 128 Church Street) in Kensington. In 1833, while on a visit to London, Mendelssohn "enjoyed flirting with two of Horsley's daughters, Fanny and Sophie". Their letters from that period are full of references to him, and were published in 1934. Fanny was an artist who died young, Sophie an accomplished pianist. Horsley's eldest daughter Mary Elizabeth (born 1813) married the engineer Isambard Kingdom Brunel. His son Charles Edward also enjoyed a certain reputation as a musician. Another son John Callcott was a painter, who is reputed to have designed the first Christmas card in 1843.
