= Cecil Frances Alexander =

British hymn-writer and poet

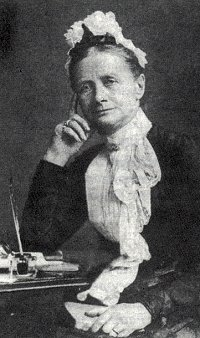
- Undated photograph of Alexander
- Born: Cecil Frances Humphreys; April 1818; Dublin, Ireland
- Died: 12 October 1895 (aged 77); Derry, Ireland
- Occupations: Hymnwriter, poet
- Notable work: Hymns for Little Children

Cecil Frances Alexander (April 1818 – 12 October 1895) was an Anglo-Irish hymnwriter and poet. Amongst other works, she wrote "All Things Bright and Beautiful", "There is a green hill far away" and the Christmas carol "Once in Royal David's City".

== Biography ==
Alexander was born at 25 Eccles Street, Dublin, the third child and second daughter of Major John Humphreys of Norfolk (land-agent to 4th Earl of Wicklow and later to the second Marquess of Abercorn), and his wife Elizabeth (née Reed). She was known by family and friends as Fanny. She began writing verse in her childhood, being strongly influenced by Dr Walter Hook, Dean of Chichester. Her subsequent religious work was strongly influenced by her contacts with the Oxford Movement, and in particular with John Keble, who edited Hymns for Little Children, one of her anthologies. By the 1840s she was already known as a hymn writer and her compositions were soon included in Church of Ireland hymnbooks. She also contributed lyric poems, narrative poems, and translations of French poetry to Dublin University Magazine under various pseudonyms. (Note: Her "Burial of Moses" appeared anonymously in Dublin University Magazine (1856), causing Tennyson to profess it one of the few poems of a living author he wished he had written.)

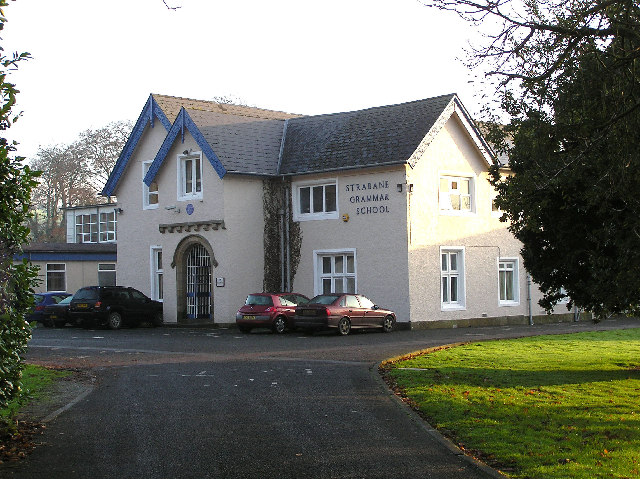
Milltown House, Strabane (later Strabane Grammar School)

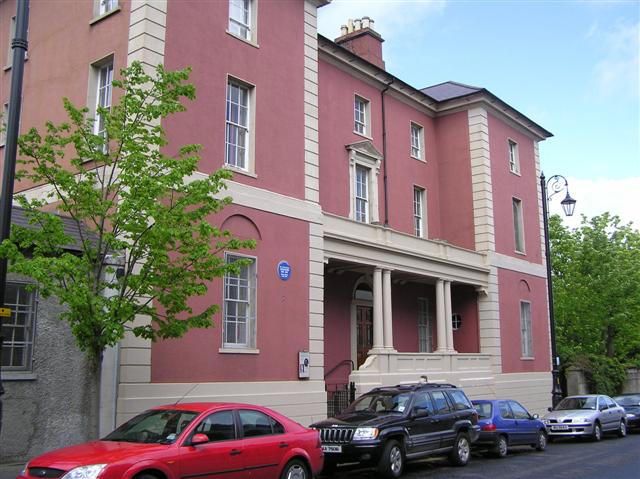
The former Bishop's Palace in Derry

In 1833, Alexander went to live at Milltown House in Strabane. (The building later became Strabane Grammar School until the school vacated the building in 2020.) While living there, she published a number of Christian books: Verses for Holy Seasons (1846), The Lord of the Forest and His Vassals (1848) – a children's allegory – and Hymns for Little Children (1848). By the close of the 19th century, Hymns for Little Children reached its 69th edition. Some of her hymns, such as "All Things Bright and Beautiful", "There is a green hill far away" (Note: With music by William Horsley) and the Christmas carol "Once in Royal David's City", are known by Christians the world over, as is her rendering of "Saint Patrick's Breastplate".

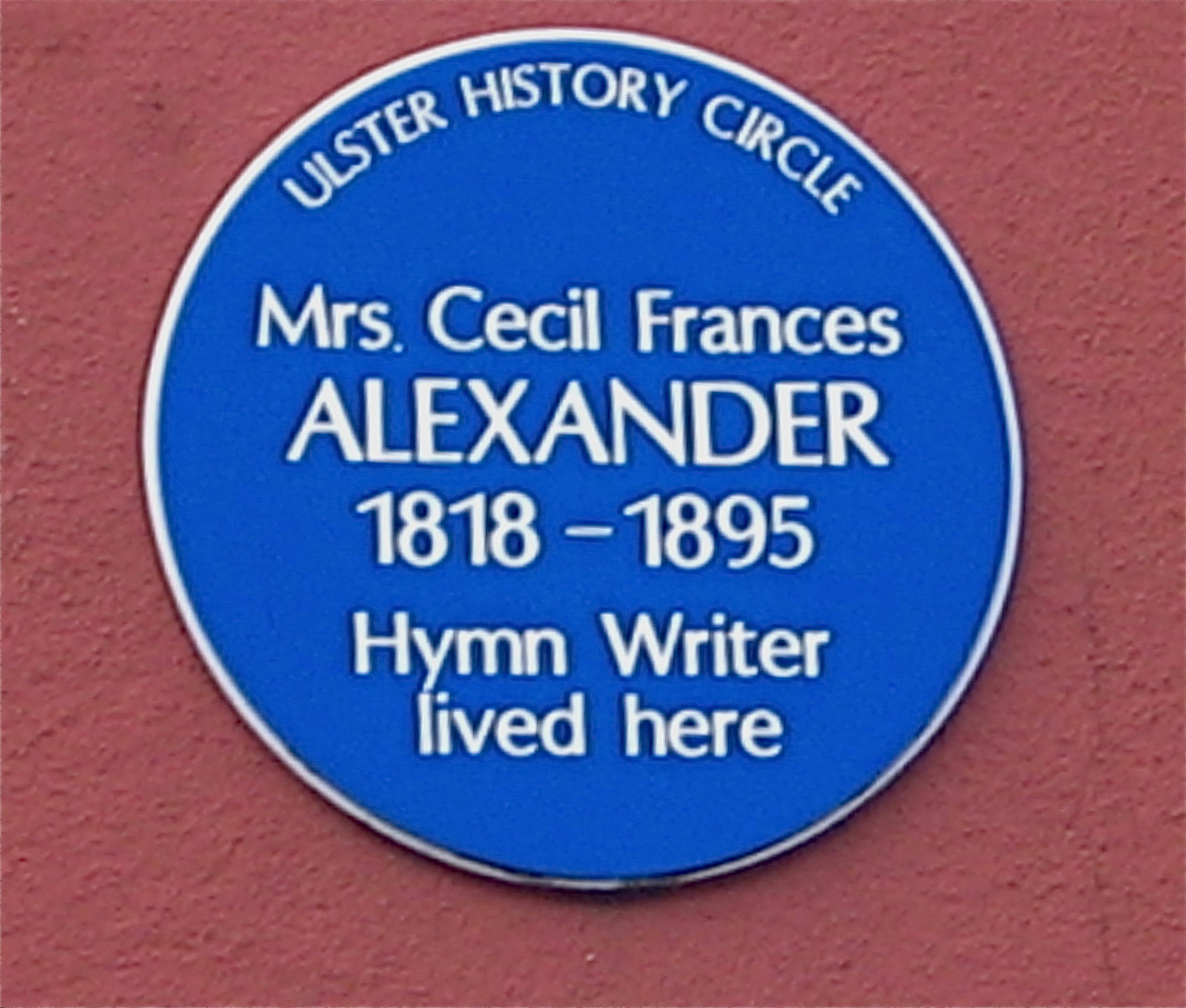
Blue plaque on the former Bishop's Palace in Derry

In Strabane in October 1850 she married the Anglican clergyman William Alexander, afterwards Bishop of Derry and Archbishop of Armagh. Her husband also wrote several books of poetry, of which the best known is St. Augustine's Holiday and other Poems. She was six years older than the clergyman, causing great family concern. Alexander published Poems on Subjects in the Old Testament in 1854, which includes the poem "The Burial of Moses," often utilized by Mark Twain during his encore performances. Her daughter, Eleanor Jane Alexander, was also a poet.

Alexander was involved in charitable work for much of her life. Money from her first publications had helped build the Derry and Raphoe Diocesan Institution for the Deaf and Dumb, which was founded in Strabane in 1846. The profits from Hymns for Little Children were also donated to the school. She was involved with the Derry Home for Fallen Women, and worked to develop a district nurses service. She was an "indefatigable visitor to poor and sick". She was criticised, however, for her endorsement of the class system, as expressed, for example, in the original third verse of "All Things Bright and Beautiful":

The rich man in his castle,
The poor man at his gate,
God made them, high or lowly,
And ordered their estate.

Usually this verse is omitted from performances of the hymn, and was omitted from The English Hymnal (1906) and the revised edition of Hymns Ancient and Modern (1950).

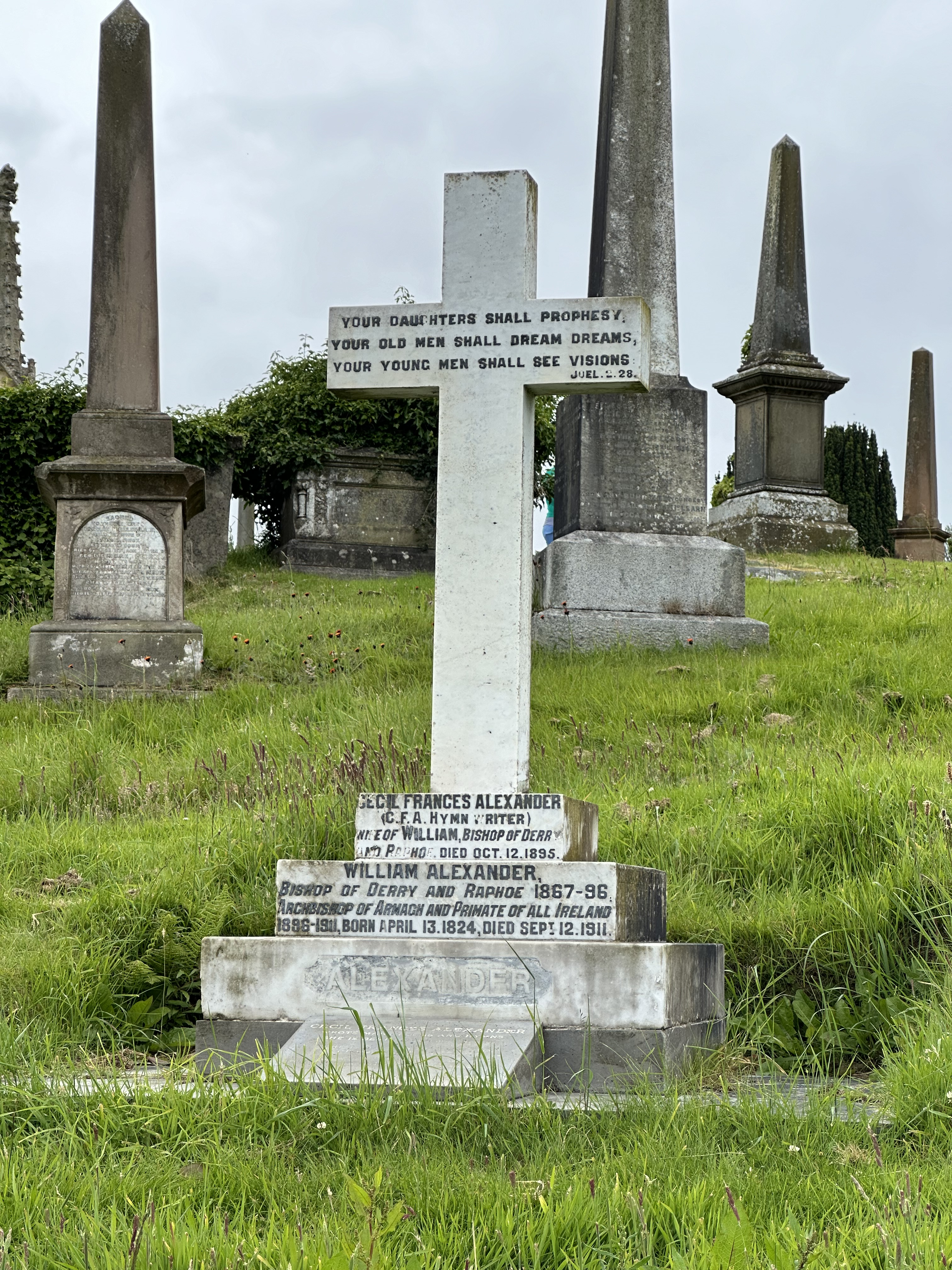
Her grave is located in the lower section of the City Cemetery in Derry and is marked by a plain white cross.

Seven hymns penned by Alexander were included in the 1873 issue of the Church of Ireland Hymnal, and eighteen of her works were contained in A Supplement to Hymns Ancient and Modern (1889). They continue to be well-accepted, as nine of her works were contained in both the 1960 and the 1987 editions of the Hymnal. A posthumous collection of her poems was published in 1896 by William Alexander, titled Poems of the late Mrs Alexander.

Alexander died at the Bishop's Palace in Derry and was buried in Derry City Cemetery. Her husband (who died in 1911) is buried beside her in a grave which was restored by the Friends of St Columb's Cathedral in 2006.

== Commemorations ==
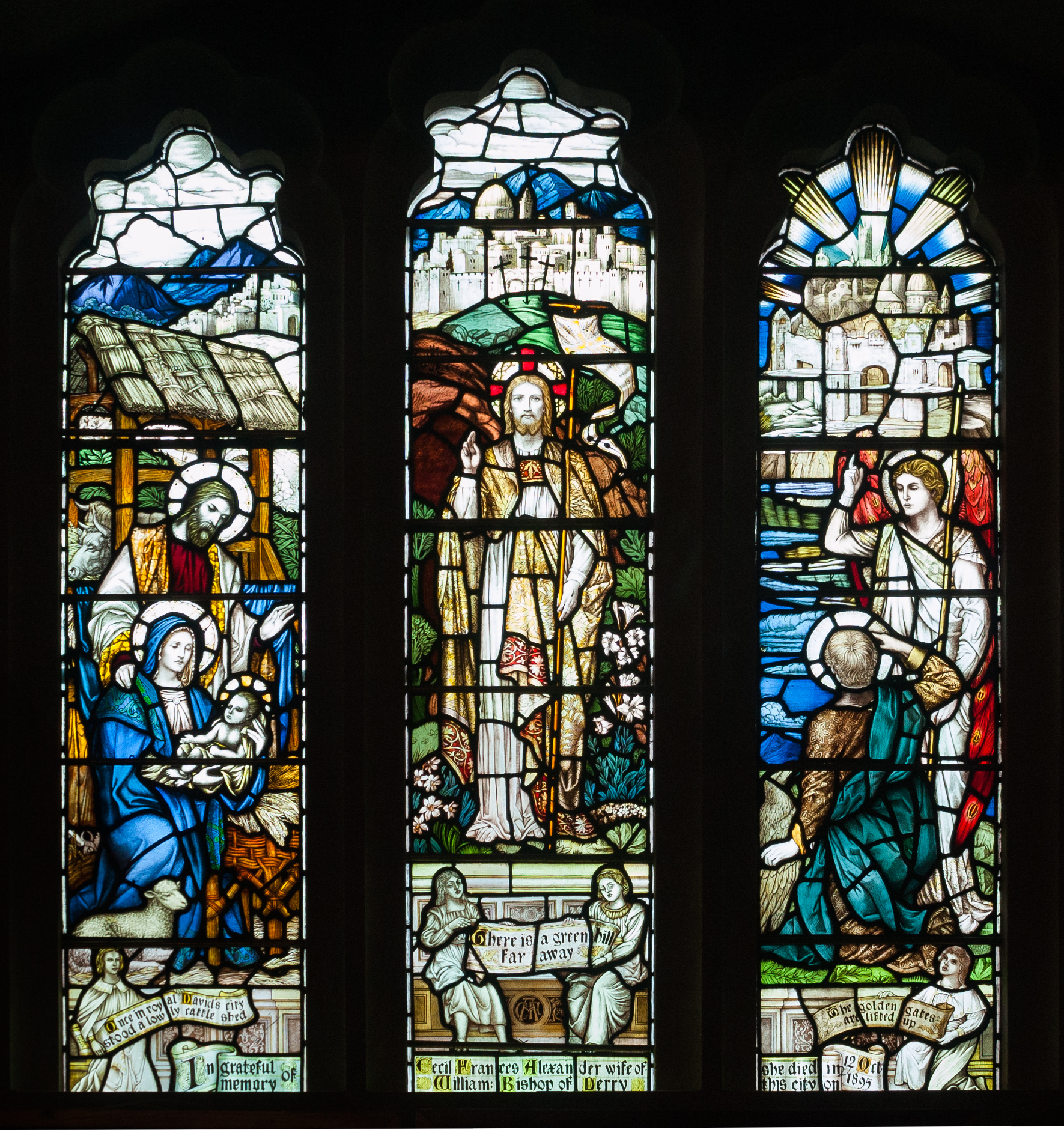
Stained glass window in memory of Cecil Frances Alexander, in St Columb's Cathedral, Derry, Northern Ireland.

In 1913 a stained glass window by James Powell and Sons in her memory was installed in the north vestibule of St Columb's Cathedral in Derry, financed by public subscription. The three lights of the windows refer to three of her hymns and show corresponding scenes: "Once in Royal David's City", "There Is a Green Hill Far Away", and "The Golden Gates Are Lifted Up".

An Ulster History Circle commemorative blue plaque was unveiled in her memory on 14 April 1995 at Bishop Street, Derry. Another plaque commemorates her residence at Milltown House.

== In popular culture ==
Lukas Media LLC (FishFlix), released the full-length documentary The stories and Hymns of Cecil Frances Alexander and Joseph Scriven in 2011. The 45 minute documentary movie talks about the life of Cecil Frances Alexander and her influence on Christian hymns.
