= Alice E. Bartlett =

American author

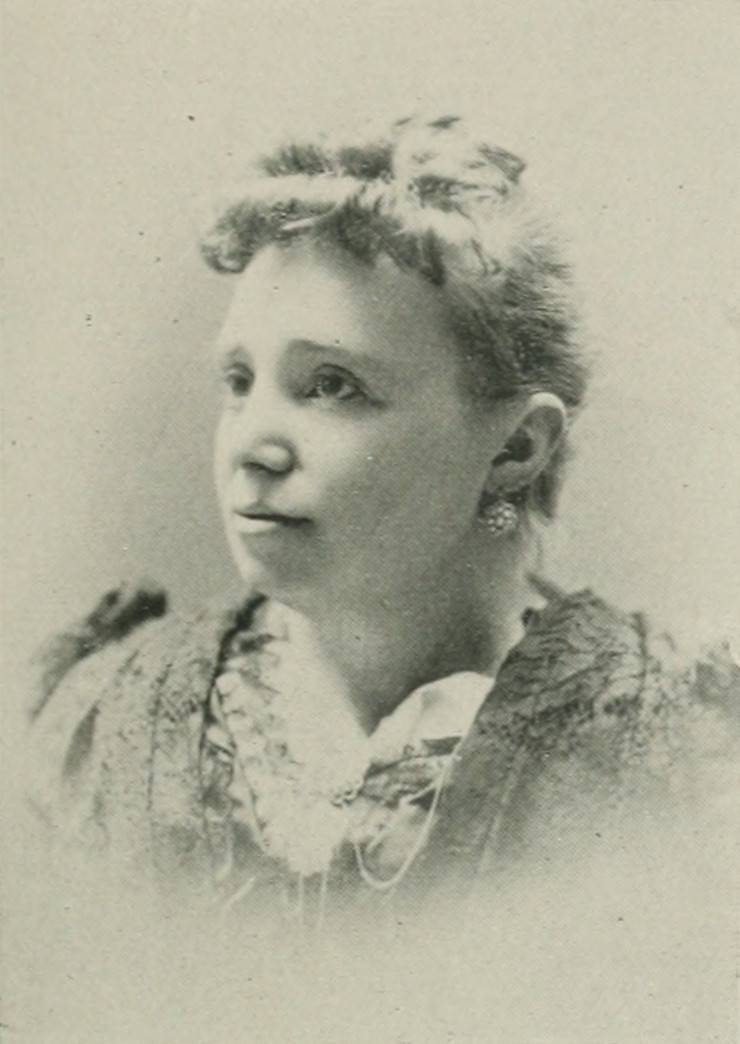
- "A Woman of the Century"
- Born: Alice Elinor (or Eloise) Bowen; September 4, 1848; Delavan, Wisconsin
- Died: November 19, 1920 (aged 72); Detroit, Michigan
- Education: University of Wisconsin
- Spouse: J. M. D. Bartlett
- Children: 2
- Writing career
- Pen name: Birch Arnold, Mrs. J.M.D. Bartlett

Alice E. Bartlett (pen name, Birch Arnold and Mrs. J. M. D. Bartlett; September 4, 1848 – November 19, 1920) was an American author. She published novels, wrote for newspapers, and penned lyrics, essays and miscellaneous writings.

== Early years and education ==
Alice Elinor (or Eloise) Bowen was born in Delavan, Wisconsin, September 4, 1848, the daughter of Joseph Bowen and Sophronia E. (Braley) Bowen. She was educated at the University of Wisconsin. On September 28, 1876, in Leavenworth, Kansas, she married J. M. D. Bartlett, books and news dealer of Quincy, Illinois. They had two children, Donald Bowen and Faith Alice (Mrs. Morse).

== Career ==
Widely known by her pen-name, "Birch Arnold", her first poem, "The Meeting of the Waters," was published in the Madison Democrat around 1870 or 1871. For six years, she was with the Chicago Herald, three years with the Chicago Chronicle, four years with the Detroit Journal, and was a writer of specials for numerous other papers and magazines. In 1877, she published her first novel, Until the Daybreak, which at once gave her a rank among story writers. In 1872, she commenced to write for the Toledo Blade and Locke's National Monthly. Her articles attracted a great deal of attention, and Locke told a friend that he intended to "adopt that promising young man;" his chagrin on learning that the young man was a young woman can be imagined. It was amusing to Bartlett to find her writing commented on as the "vigorous ideas of thinking men." To the world-at-large, she was often addressed as, "Birch Arnold, Esq." Ill health for several years prevented the continuous effort necessary for pronounced success, but she did continue to write lyrics, essays and miscellaneous writings from time to time. Bartlett was also a dramatic reader, often reciting her own poems in public.

Bartlett made her home in Detroit, Michigan. She was the first president of the Detroit Press Club (served five years); and she was a member of the Michigan Woman's State Press Association, Wolverine Press Club, and the National Press Association. She was a Congregationalist, she favored women's suffrage, and in politics, she was a Democrat. Bartlett died on November 19, 1920, in Detroit, Michigan.

== Selected works ==
- Until the Daybreak, 1877
- A New Aristocracy, 1891
- The Spirit of the Inland Seas, 1901
- The Mystery of the Monogram, 1904
- Birch Leaves: Homely Verse for Homely People, 1905
