= Springtown Camp =

Former US military base turned emergency housing, Northern Ireland

Springtown Camp was a former United States military camp near Derry, Northern Ireland, that housed up to 400 Catholic families in the 1940s to 1960s in substandard housing rented by the local authority. The outcry over the Unionist-controlled city council's failure to re-house the tenants in proper buildings gave rise to some of the first Northern Irish civil rights protests of the 1960s.

== Beginnings ==
Springtown Camp was built by the United States Navy during World War II and consisted of 302 corrugated iron Nissen huts and a number of other temporary buildings. It was sited in the western outskirts of the city, off the Buncrana Road, in an area now redeveloped as an industrial estate, and was part of the US Navy's "Base One Europe", accommodating arriving Marines and Navy personnel. Eleanor Roosevelt visited in 1942.

== Squatters ==
After the United States Navy evacuated the camp at the end of the war, local people living in over-crowded terraced homes, sometimes with three families living in one small house, broke into the camp in August 1946 and squatted in the huts. The huts lacked running water, electricity, or any means of heating, but they still provided the families with space, which was lacking in their previous homes.

== Protests ==
After a public outcry, the Londonderry Corporation granted "temporary" rentals to the new occupants and charged rent. This agreement was supposed to last six months, after which the families were to be housed in proper houses in Derry City. The quality of the accommodation was poor, and over time conditions in the tin huts deteriorated due to lack of repairs and became hazardous and prone to fires, leading to a sustained campaign for rehousing. The promised rehousing never occurred due to discrimination, as the residents of Springtown Camp were over 90% Catholic and Nationalist, though the camp also had some working-class Protestant residents. They again refused to re-house the people of the camp, recognising that moving many Catholic Nationalists to different areas of Derry would jeopardise their grip on power.

Children grew up, married, and were obliged to live with parents, resulting in over-crowding. The Corporation resisted the residents' campaign for years but after a "silent" protest march by the residents from the camp to Derry's Guildhall was televised and broadcast to many homes throughout Ireland, pressure was mounting on the Londonderry Corporation to act. However the residents' protest gained so much support that the Londonderry Corporation was forced to move on the rehousing of the people. Eventually all the residents were rehoused and on 11 October 1967 the last two families were finally housed to make way for the Springtown industrial estate.

Springtown Camp, intended to provide temporary housing for the people for a maximum of six months, was in existence for period of over 21 years. The camp residents claim that their march from Springtown Camp to Derry's Guildhall on Tuesday 28 January 1964, was the first Northern Irish civil rights march in the 1960s and was a precursor to the Northern Ireland Civil Rights Association (NICRA) march in Duke Street, Derry, where the marchers were beaten by the Royal Ulster Constabulary with batons. This march led to worldwide condemnation of the RUC and led to other Civil Rights Marches throughout Northern Ireland which was the start of the "Troubles" in Northern Ireland which lasted over 30 years.

The Derry Journal, in a two-page article in their 25 January 2019 edition on the 55th anniversary of the Springtown Camp silent protest march of Tuesday 28 January 1964, quoted founder-member of NICRA Fionnbarra O'Dochartaigh confirming that that march was the first march in the civil rights campaign in Derry. He further confirmed it was the spark that led to the formation of the Derry Housing Action Committee (DHAC).

== Today ==
Willie Deery and Hugo McConnell are former residents who lobbied politicians for support to obtain planning permission to erect an art installation in remembrance of the community who lived there. The memorial also remembers the camps' first occupants, the US Navy personnel who were billeted there from 1942 until they vacated the Nissen huts at the end of World War II. The memorial was completed in 2019.
