= Derry City Cemetery =

Cemetery in Derry, Northern Ireland

Coordinates: 54°59′33″N 7°20′24″W

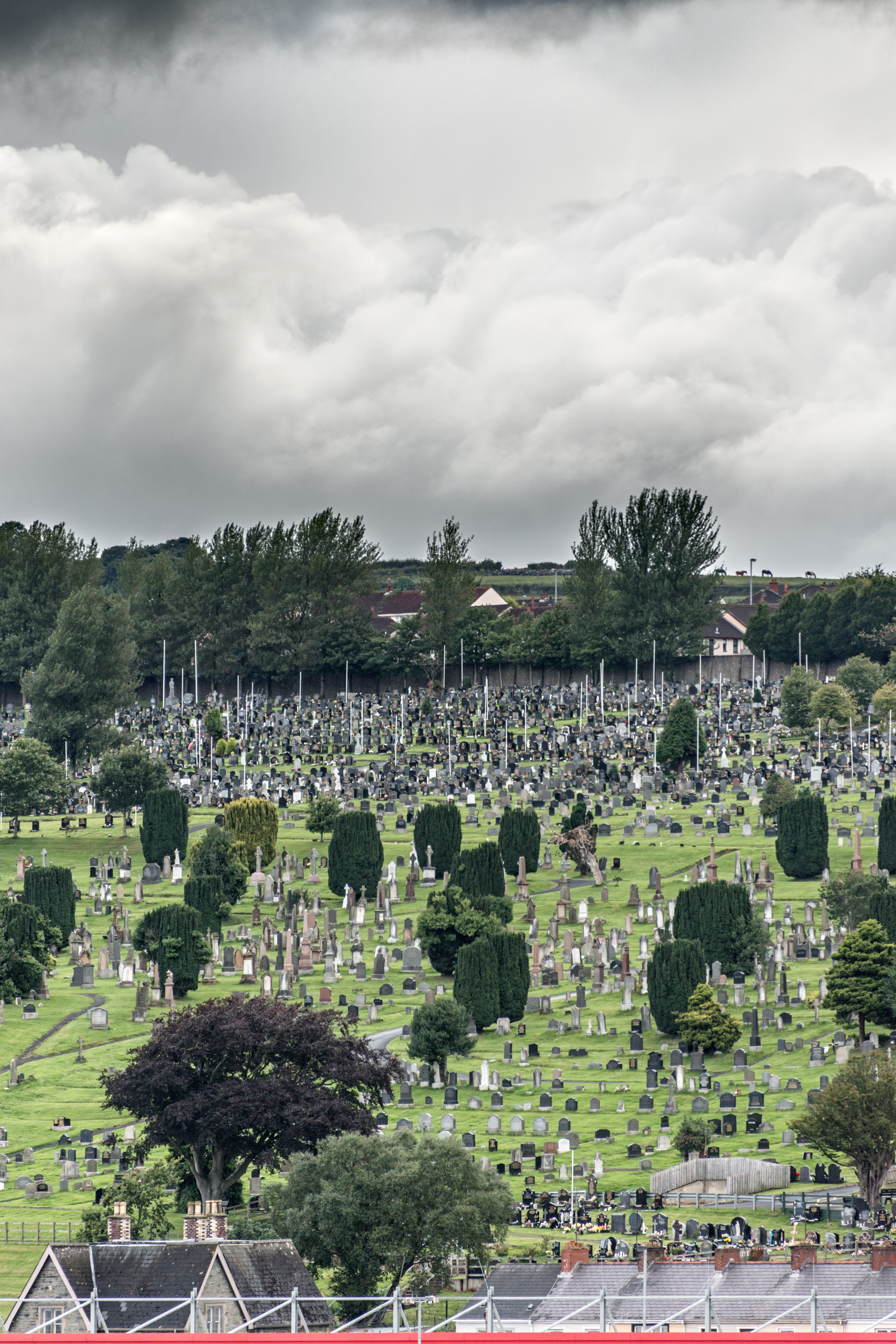
Derry City Cemetery in 2017

Derry City Cemetery, known locally as the City Cemetery, is a cemetery based in the Creggan area of Derry, Northern Ireland. By the mid-19th century Derry’s graveyards were becoming overcrowded, and soon would reach capacity. To alleviate the strain the cemetery was opened in 1853, becoming the first municipal cemetery in the city. By 1867 the graveyards at St Columb's Cathedral, St. Augustine’s Church, and Long Tower Chapel had all stopped accepting ‘new’ burials. Due to this the cemetery became the main burial ground for the city's Protestant and Catholic population. It is the final resting place for over 70,000 people and includes graves to victims of the cholera pandemics of the late 1800s, as well as graves of those who fought in WWII. Hunger striker and INLA member Patsy O'Hara is also buried in the cemetery.

In recent years the cemetery suffered from vandalism and antisocial behaviour, with holy ornaments and flower pots being damaged or destroyed. In an attempt to deal with the problems the council installed CCTV. In May 2016 the City Cemetery Records Project was set up and 40 volunteers transcribes and verified over 45,000 entries from the Cemetery's Burial Registers from the formation of the cemetery up until 1961. In 2018 a local historian set up the 'Friends of Derry City Cemetery' to organise tours in an attempt to deal with the problems.

The cemetery is also rapidly approaching capacity, despite the opening of a new section on the lower part of the cemetery. As of March 2020 the council stated that there are approximately 650 plots that remain available, and that the cemetery is expected to reach capacity by 2025, although it will remain open to secondary burials until 2043.

In March 2022 work commenced on an expansion to the city cemetery, with land used near Southway in Derry to increase the cemetery capacity with an extra 950 plots being available. The work was completed by December 2022.

Derry City Cemetery is open seven days a week - with the cemetery open from 8.00am until 8.00pm running from the end of March (when the clocks are put forward one hour) until the end of October (when the clocks go back one hour). During the winter months of early November until late March, the cemetery is open from 8.00am until 4.30pm.

== Notable burials ==
- Cecil Frances Alexander (1818–1895), poet
- John Hume (1937–2020), Nobel Peace Prize laureate and nationalist politician
- Eddie McAteer (1914–1986), leader of the Nationalist Party
- James McCarron (1851–1918), trade unionist and Labour politician
- Martin McGuinness (1950–2017), former Irish Republican Army leader and Sinn Féin politician
- Jimmy McShane (1957–1995), singer and musician
- Hugh O'Doherty (1857–1924), nationalist politician and Mayor of Derry
- Patsy O'Hara (1957–1981), leader of the Irish National Liberation Army and participant in the 1981 Irish hunger strike
- Michael Devine (1954-1981), member of the Irish National Liberation Army and participant in the 1981 Irish hunger strike
