= Patsy O'Hara =

Irish republican (1957–1981)

- Peatsaí Ó hEadhra
- Born: 11 July 1957; Brandywell, Derry, Northern Ireland
- Died: 21 May 1981 (aged 23); HM Prison Maze, Northern Ireland
- Resting place: Derry City Cemetery
- Known for: Died after 61 days during the 1981 Irish Hunger Strike
- Political party: Official Sinn Féin (1971–1973); Irish Republican Socialist Party (from 1975)
- Military career
- Paramilitary: Fianna Éireann (1970–1975); Irish National Liberation Army (1975–1981)
- Rank: Officer Commanding
- Conflict: The Troubles

Patsy O'Hara (Irish: Peatsaí Ó hEadhra; 11 July 1957 – 21 May 1981) was an Irish republican hunger striker and member of the Irish National Liberation Army (INLA). O'Hara was one of 10 Irish republicans who died in the 1981 hunger strike.

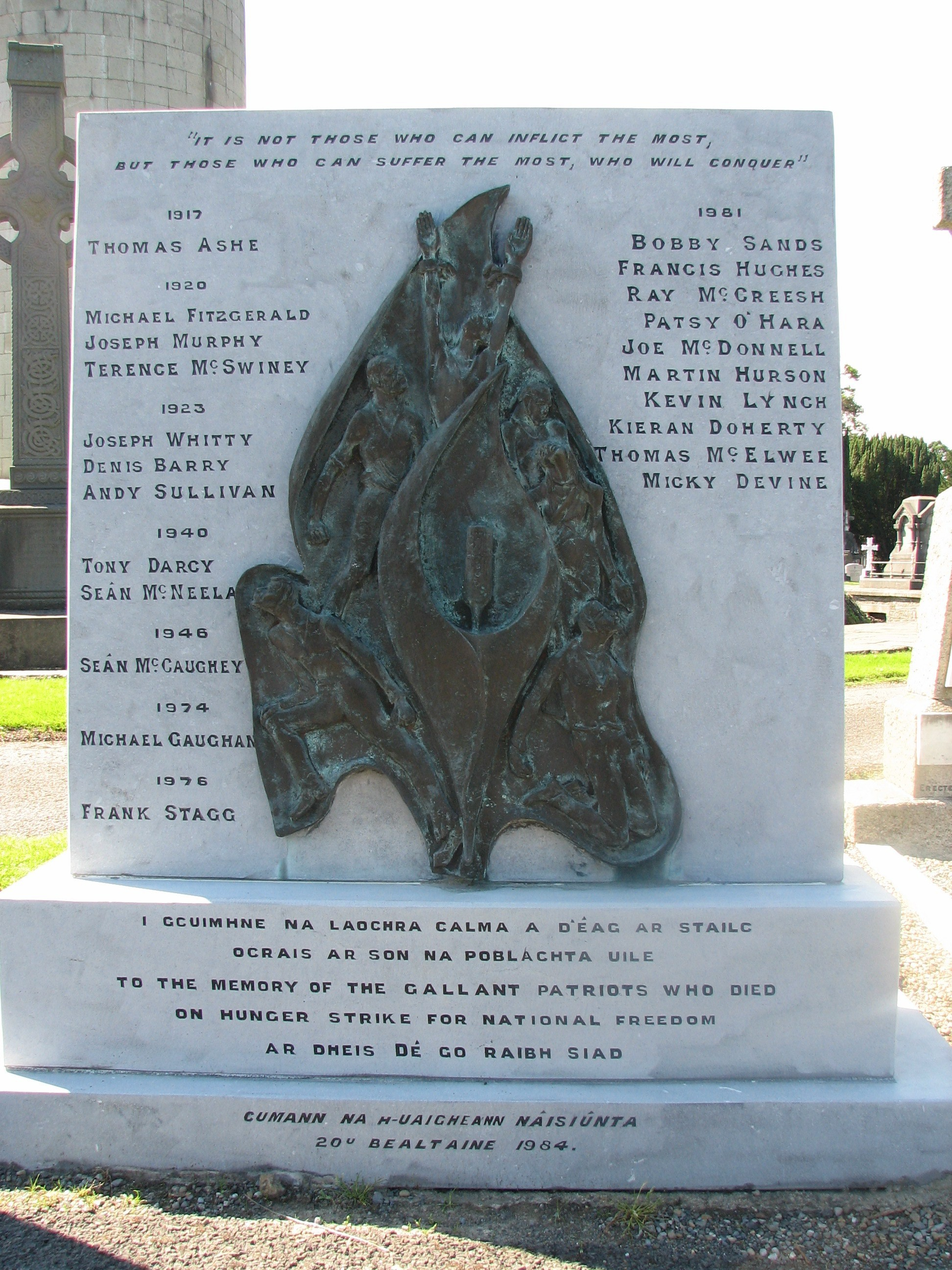
Memorial to 22 Irish Hunger Strikers Deaths Glasnevin Cemetery

== Biography ==
O'Hara was born in Bishop Street, Derry, Northern Ireland. He joined Official IRA-aligned faction of Na Fianna Éireann in 1970, and in 1971, one of his brothers Sean was interned in Long Kesh. In early 1971 he joined the local Official Sinn Féin cumann in the Bogside. In late 1971, at the age of 14, he was shot and wounded by a soldier while manning a barricade. Due to his injuries, he was unable to attend the civil rights march on Bloody Sunday but watched it go by him in the Brandywell, and the events of the day had a lasting effect on him.

In October 1974, O'Hara was interned in Long Kesh, and on his release in April 1975 he joined the Irish Republican Socialist Party (IRSP) and INLA. He was arrested in Derry in June 1975 and held on remand for six months. In September 1976, he was arrested again and once more held on remand for four months.

On 10 May 1978, he was arrested on O'Connell Street, Dublin, Republic of Ireland under section 30 of the Offences Against the State Act, and was released 18 hours later. He returned to Derry in January 1979 and was active in the INLA. On 14 May 1979, he was arrested and was convicted of possessing a hand grenade. He was sentenced to eight years in prison in January 1980.

He became Officer Commanding of the INLA prisoners at the beginning of the first hunger strike in 1980, and he joined the 1981 hunger strike on 22 March. During the hunger strike, O'Hara and other hunger strikers were given golden crucifixes by Pope John Paul II.

On Thursday, 21 May, at 11:29 pm, he died after 61 days on hunger strike, at the age of 23. Despite a plea from his mother two days before his death, O'Hara expressed his desire not to receive the medical intervention needed to save his life. His corpse was found to be mysteriously disfigured prior to its departure from prison and before the funeral, including signs of his face being beaten, a broken nose, and cigarette burns on his body. Raymond McCreesh, a member of the Provisional IRA, also died on 21 May 1981 during the hunger strike. Following his death, INLA member Kevin Lynch took his place on the hunger strike.

=== Family ===
His mother Peggy O'Hara, was an independent candidate in the 2007 Northern Ireland Assembly election in the Foyle constituency. She was not elected, but she was one of the more successful dissident republican candidates opposed to the new policy of the Sinn Féin leadership of working with the Police Service of Northern Ireland (PSNI), and won 1,789 votes. On the eve of the election, over 330 former republican prisoners wrote a letter to the Derry Journal endorsing her campaign.

O'Hara's brother, Anthony O'Hara, was also a prisoner in Long Kesh and stood as a candidate during the 1981 general election for the Dublin West constituency. He received 3,034 votes (6.49% of the vote) but failed to take a seat.

His sister, Elizabeth O'Hara, took part in a tour in the United States by NORAID. Some in NORAID objected to O'Hara's involvement stating her brother was a "communist" and that it would tarnish their image among Irish-Americans at the time. However, Malachy McCreesh and Seán Sand, relatives of other hunger strikers, refused to participate unless O'Hara was allowed to accompany them. A meeting of the IRSP Ard-Chomhairle following the tour revealed that all the money collected was distributed to Provisional prisoners families, with none going to INLA prisoners families. O'Hara also allowed filmmaker Mickey Rourke to use the story of her brother in a film to help NORAID, however Denis Donaldson disrupted this effort and ultimately the film ceased development. She later married Kevin Kelly and became a multi-millionaire.
