= James Huston (typographer) =

Canadian typographer and journalist

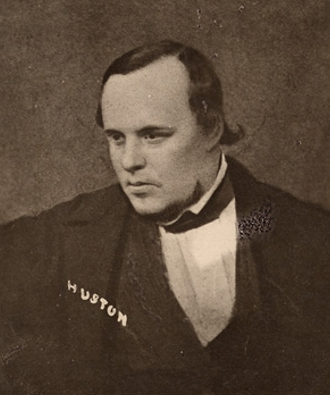
- Born: August 17, 1820; Quebec City, Lower Canada
- Died: September 21, 1854 (aged 34); Quebec City, Lower Canada
- Occupations: typographer, journalist, and author

James Huston (August 17, 1820 – September 21, 1854) was a Canadian typographer and journalist. Born in Quebec City, he was also a longtime member and subsequent President of the Institut canadien de Montréal.

Huston is best known as the compiler of Le répertoire national which was a collection of the works of Canadian writers for the previous half century.

He died in Quebec, aged 34.
