= Leyla Khanim =

Turkish poet

Leyla Hanim (d. 1848) was a 19th-century women poet from the Ottoman Empire.

== Biography ==
Leyla Hanım was born (date unknown) in Istanbul. Her father was Moralızâde Hâmid Efendi and her mother was Hadîce Hanım. She was educated by the father of poet Mehmed Fuad Pasha, Mehmed Fuad Pasha, who was also a poet and writer. Leyla experienced a brief marriage which resulted in divorce. She died in 1848. As a member of the Mevlevi Order, she is buried at the Galata Mevlevihanesi.

After Leyla's divorce, she started writing poetry collected in a diwan. She experimented with various forms of poetry. After her father died she wrote odes in the Iran tradition of ghazal.

== Sources ==
- Mehmed Zihnî Efendi. In: Meşahir ün-nisa. 1877 (in Turkish).
- Sami Frashëri. Kâmûsü’l-A’lâm’a Göre 19.Yüzyılın Sonunda Trabzon. 1877 (in Turkish)
