= All Things Bright and Beautiful =

Anglican hymn written by Cecil Frances Alexander

- Genre: Hymn
- Written: 1848
- Text: Cecil Frances Alexander
- Meter: 7.6.7.6 with refrain
- Melody: All Things Bright And Beautiful (William Henry Monk, 1887); Royal Oak (Trad. 17th C)

"All Things Bright and Beautiful" is an Anglican hymn, also sung in many other Christian denominations. The words are by Cecil Frances Alexander and were first published in her Hymns for Little Children of 1848.

The hymn is commonly sung to the hymn tune All Things Bright And Beautiful, composed by William Henry Monk in 1887. Another popular tune is Royal Oak, adapted from a 17th-century English folk tune, "The 29th of May".

== History ==
The hymn was first published in 1848 in Mrs Cecil Alexander's Hymns for Little Children. It consists of a series of stanzas that elaborate upon the clause of the Apostles' Creed that describes God as "maker of heaven and earth", and has been described as asserting a creationist view of the natural world.

It has been suggested that a number of sources may have influenced Alexander's composition. The hymn may have been inspired by Psalm 104, verses 24 and 25: "Oh Lord, how manifold are thy works! in wisdom hast thou made them all: the earth is full of thy riches. So is this great and wide sea, wherein are things creeping innumerable, both small and great beasts". The hymn may have been inspired as well by a verse from Samuel Taylor Coleridge's The Rime of the Ancient Mariner: "He prayeth best, who loveth best; All things great and small; For the dear God who loveth us; He made and loveth all." Alternatively, inspiration may have come from William Paley's Natural Theology, published in 1802, that argues for God as the designer of the natural world. For example, the hymn's second verse alludes to "wings" and verse 7 refers to "eyes". Paley cited wings and eyes as examples of complexity of design, analogous to that of a watch, with God as the Divine Watchmaker.

Inspiration for Alexander's hymn text "The purple-headed mountain, The river running by" has been attributed to four separate locations in Wales, Ireland and England. Alexander visited Llanwenarth House in Govilon, Monmouthshire in 1848, and according to this claim, the hymn refers to the nearby Sugar Loaf or the Blorenge mountains, and to the River Usk. She is also known to have visited Markree Castle near Sligo, and some sources link Alexander's text with the surrounding gardens there. Alexander's travels also took her to the nearby village of Dunster in Somerset in 1848, and the landscape of Grabbist Hill and the River Avill are also claimed to be her inspiration.

However, a more credible account is given by Sir John Heygate of Bellarena House in County Londonderry, which links the hymn to the many visits paid by the Alexanders to what was then the Gage family residence, a family into which Sir John's ancestor, Sir Frederick Heygate, married in 1850. Writing in 1973, Sir John attributed "the purple headed mountain" to nearby Benevenagh, and "the river running by" to the River Roe which flows past Bellerena House. Sir John had heard the story from the late Sir Norman Stronge, Speaker of the House of Commons of Northern Ireland, whose family also had ties to the area.

Purple-headed mountains and rivers running by: possible inspiration

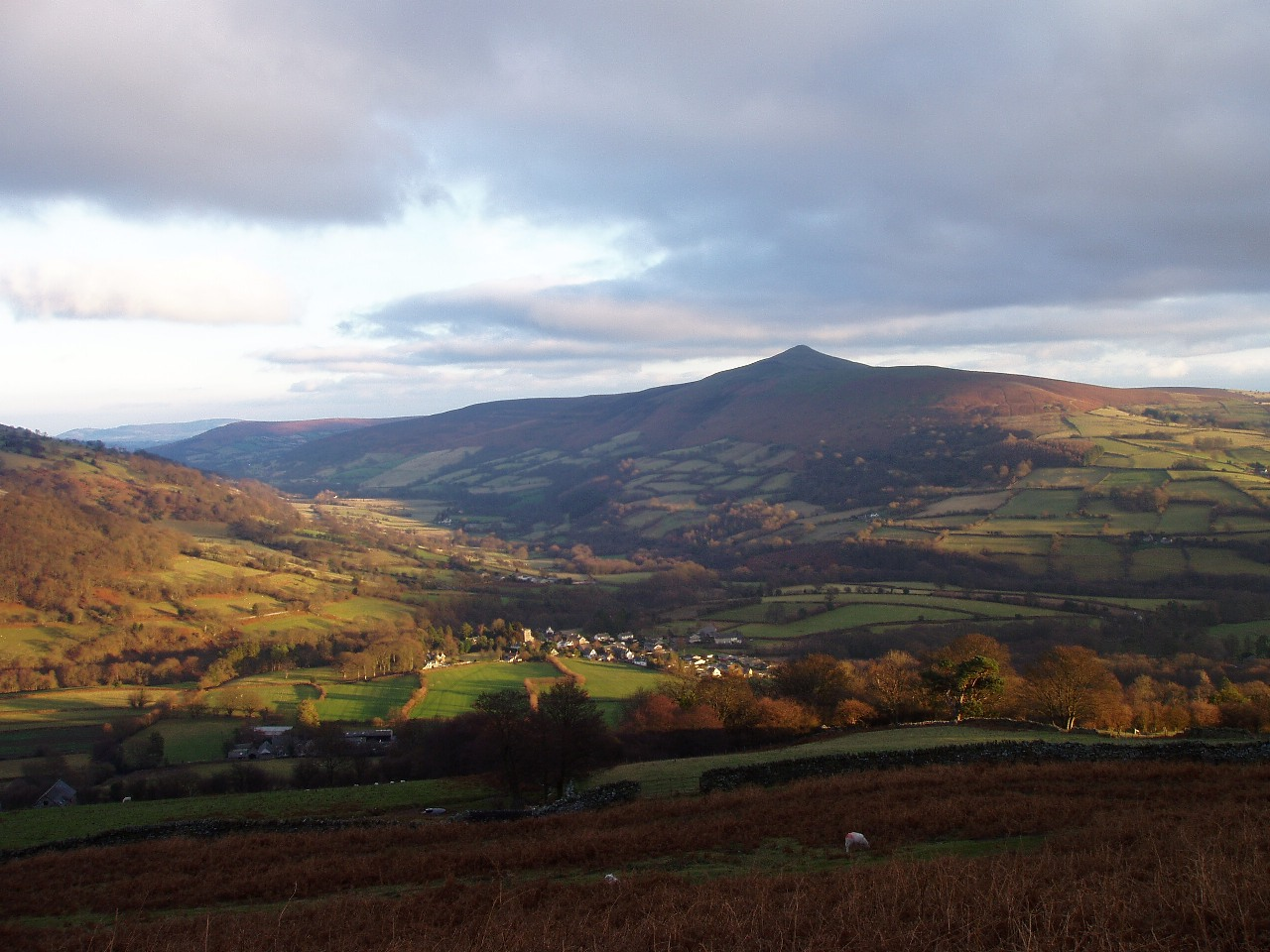
The Sugar Loaf, Monmouthshire

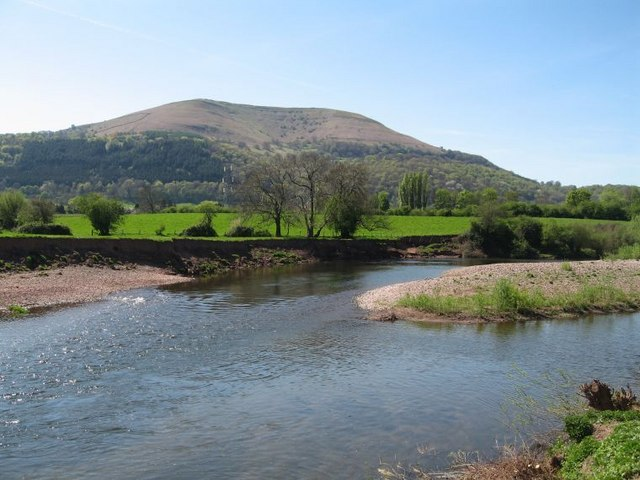
Blorenge, Monmouthshire, with the River Usk running by

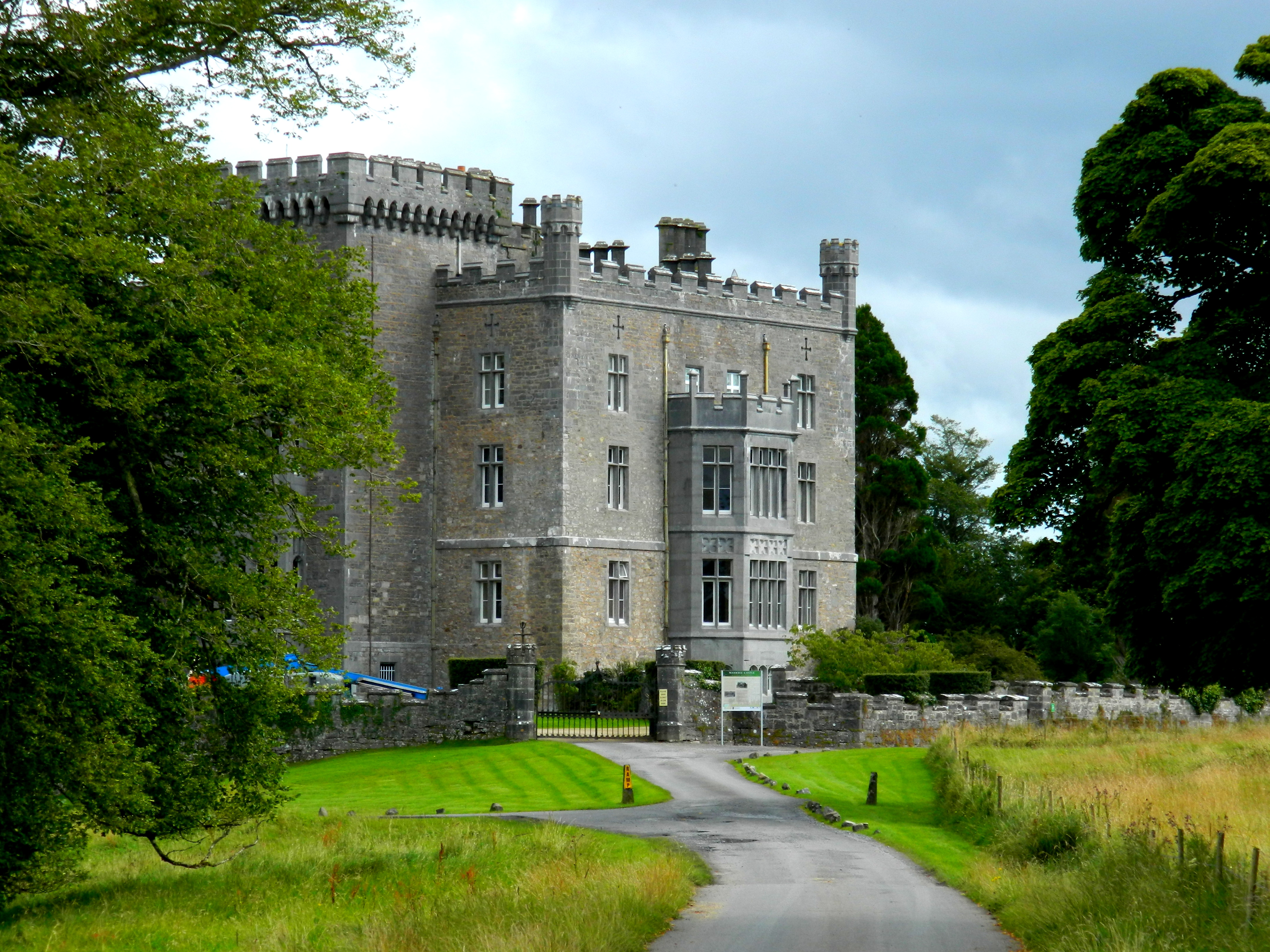
Markree Castle gardens

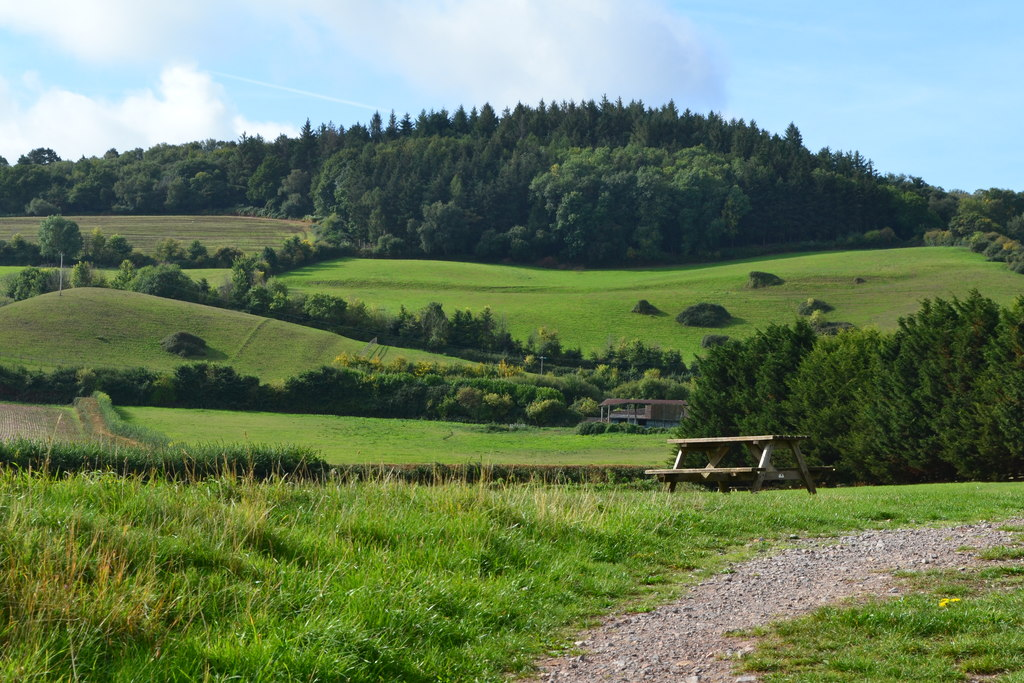
Grabbist Hill, Somerset

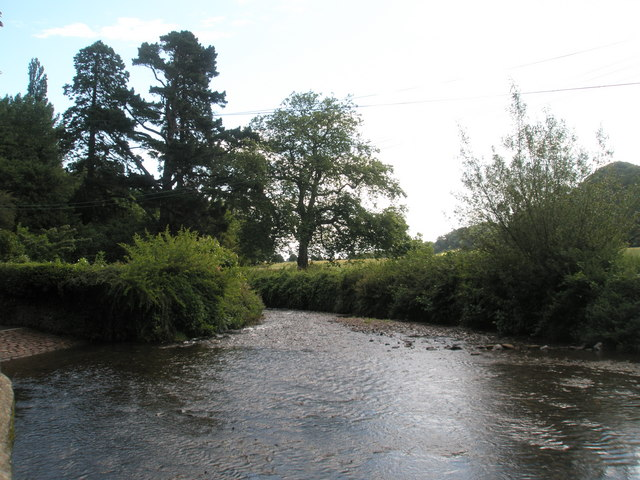
the River Avill, Somerset

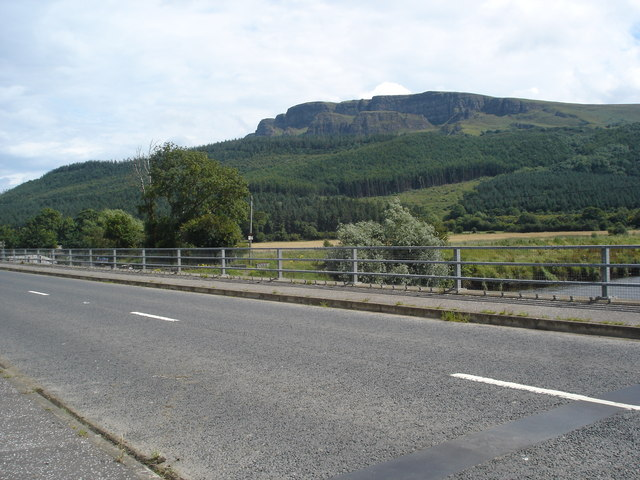
Benevenagh, County Londonderry

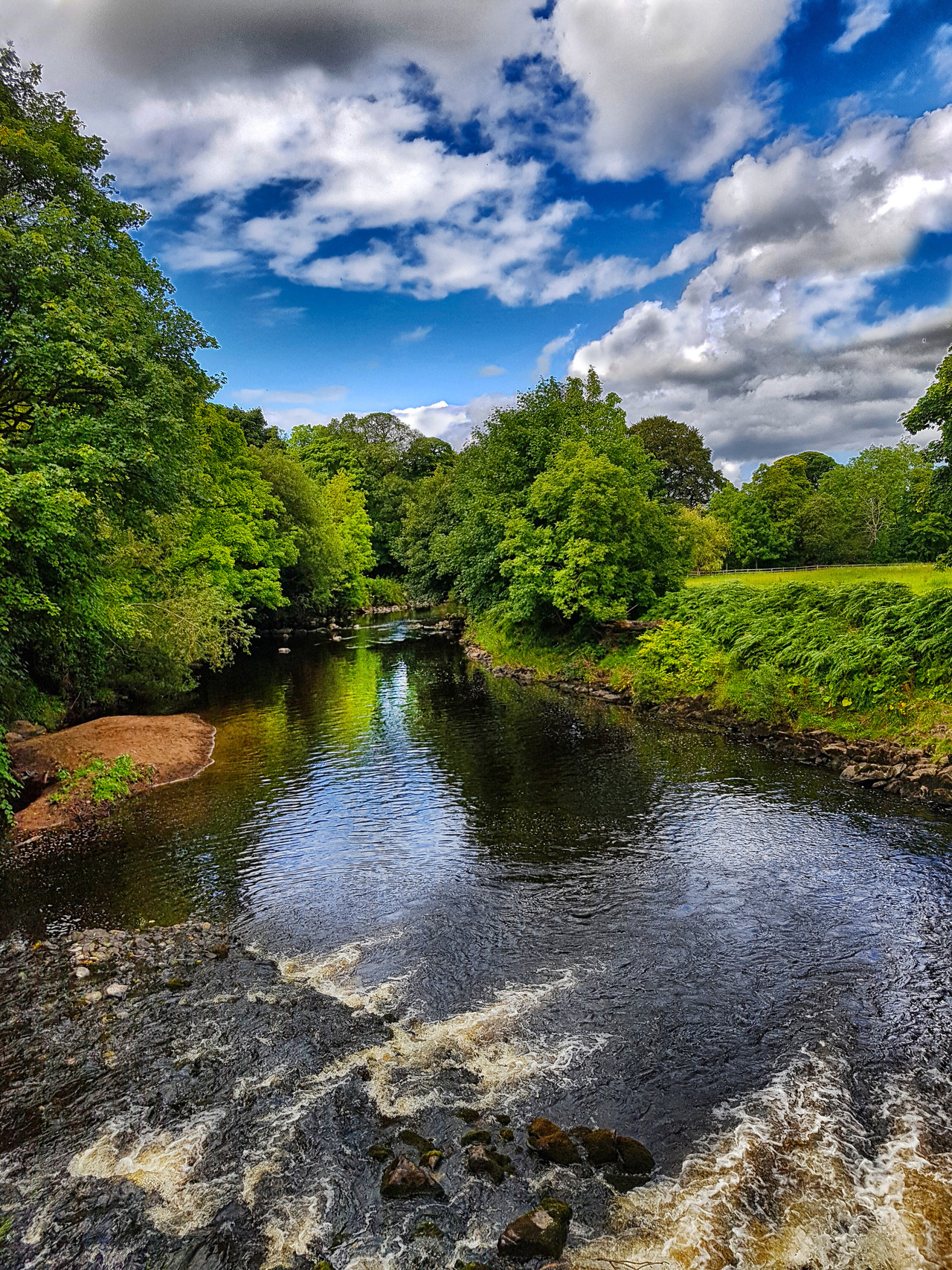
River Roe, County Londonderry

The third verse makes reference to "The rich man in his castle,/The poor man at his gate", and asserts that their social positions have been ordained by God. It has been interpreted as an expression of the theological view that society is ordered and upheld by Divine providence. This view of social strata has been linked to Alexander's identity as an Anglo-Irish person affirming the existing social order in the midst of the Irish famine. An alternative interpretation of the third verse holds that Alexander was expressing the equality of rich and poor in the eyes of God. A comparable text in Alexander's Verses for Holy Seasons (1846) makes reference to "The poor man in his straw-roofed cottage,/The rich man in his lordly hall" and states that their prayers to God are of equal importance: "He listens, and He answers all".

Nevertheless, the sentiments of this verse are generally considered to be outdated and many later versions and performances of "All Things Bright and Beautiful" omit the third verse. Percy Dearmer omitted this verse from The English Hymnal (1906); he was sympathetic to Christian socialism and stated that the words reflected the "passivity and inertia at the heart of the British Establishment in the face of huge inequalities in Edwardian society". Dearmer questioned whether Alexander had remembered the parable of the Rich man and Lazarus (Luke 16:19–31), and attributed her view of the world to her having "been brought up in the atmosphere of a land-agent on an Irish estate". The revised edition of Hymns Ancient and Modern, published in 1950, also omits this verse.

== Words ==
Alexander's text reads:

1.
All things bright and beautiful,
All creatures great and small,
All things wise and wonderful,
The Lord God made them all.

2.
Each little flower that opens,
Each little bird that sings,
He made their glowing colours,
He made their tiny wings.

All things bright ...

3.
The rich man in his castle,
The poor man at his gate,
God made them, high or lowly,
And ordered their estate.

All things bright ...

4.
The purple-headed mountain,
The river running by,
The sunset and the morning,
That brightens up the sky.

All things bright ...

5.
The cold wind in the winter,
The pleasant summer sun,
The ripe fruits in the garden,−
He made them every one:

All things bright ...

6.
The tall trees in the greenwood,
The meadows where we play,
The rushes by the water,
We gather every day;−

All things bright ...

7.
He gave us eyes to see them,
And lips that we might tell,
How great is God Almighty,
Who has made all things well.

All things bright ...

(Amen)

The United Church of Canada includes a fourth verse:

The rocky mountain splendour,
The lone wolf's haunting call,
The Great Lakes and the prairies,
The forest in the fall.

== Musical setting ==
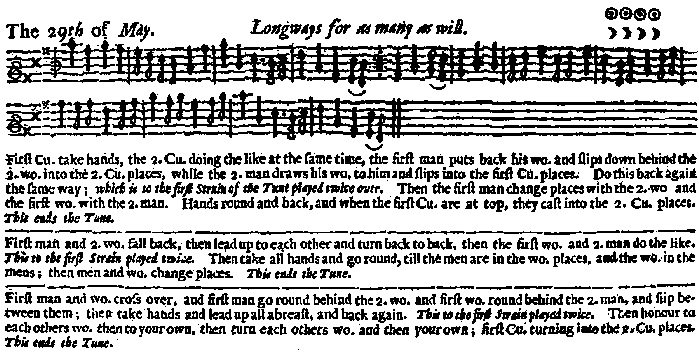
"The 29th of May" from The Dancing Master by John Playford (Seventh Edition – 1686)

Hymn tunes for "All Things Bright and Beautiful"
All Things Bright and Beautiful
William Henry Monk, 1887

Royal Oak (trad. 17th C.)

The hymn is often sung to the hymn tune All Things Bright And Beautiful, composed by William Henry Monk in 1887.

It is also frequently sung to the tune Royal Oak, a melody that was adapted from a 17th-century folk tune, "The Twenty-Ninth of May", published in The Dancing Master in 1686. The melody may have political origins in the English Civil War, and its name is thought to be a reference to the Royal Oak, a tree at Boscobel, Shropshire in which King Charles II hid himself in 1651. This tune was first arranged for the hymn by Martin Shaw in 1916, published in his book for children, Song Time. This arrangement became widely associated with the hymn after it was included in Songs of Praise (hymnal).

There have also been other adaptations, such as a full choral piece by John Rutter. In earlier editions of the Church of Scotland's Church Hymnary, the tunes "God in Nature" by John Stainer and "All Things Bright" by Frederick Arthur Gore Ouseley had been used. The chorus has been recommended as a Christian song for children to learn, even for children as young as five years of age.

Another tune used in the Apostolic Christian Church of America was composed by Mary Yergler Rassi.

== Cultural legacy ==
In the 20th century, the writer James Herriot used lines from the hymn as titles for his series of veterinary story collections, All Creatures Great and Small (1972), All Things Bright and Beautiful (1974), All Things Wise and Wonderful (1977) and The Lord God Made Them All (1981). Material from his books has also been adapted as a film, All Creatures Great and Small (1975), as a television series of the same name in 1978 and another in 2020.

For the 1970 science fiction film Beneath the Planet of the Apes, composer Leonard Rosenman composed a discordant version of the hymn, rewritten for a dystopian cult who worship a nuclear bomb.

The hymn was parodied by the Monty Python comedy troupe in their 1980 album Monty Python's Contractual Obligation Album; Alexander's text is inverted and a choir sings in praise of "All Things Dull And Ugly" to Monk's melody.

Another parody features in Dad's Army (1971 film). Captain Mainwaring, Sergeant Wilson and Corporal Jones sing orders to the squad while disguised as choirboys to disarm the three Nazi bomber pilots.

The opening theme of the film Saving Grace (2000) includes Mark Russell's chiefly instrumental variation of William Henry Monk's melody.
