= 1913 in poetry =

I think that I shall never see

A poem lovely as a tree.

A tree whose hungry mouth is prest
Against the earth's sweet flowing breast;

A tree that looks at God all day,
And lifts her leafy arms to pray;

A tree that may in summer wear
A nest of robins in her hair;

Upon whose bosom snow has lain;
Who intimately lives with rain.

Poems are made by fools like me,

But only God can make a tree.

— Joyce Kilmer (1886–1918), "Trees", first published this year

Rose is a rose is a rose is a rose.

— Gertrude Stein (1874–1946), from "Sacred Emily", written this year

Nationality words link to articles with information on the nation's poetry or literature (for instance, Irish or France).

== Events ==
- January and March – Three poems by H.D. appear in the January issue of Poetry: A Magazine of Verse, submitted by Ezra Pound, the magazine's "foreign editor" and a close associate of Doolittle. The March issue also contains Pound's "A Few Don'ts by an Imagiste" and F. S. Flint's essay Imagisme. This publication history means that this London-based movement has its first readership in the United States.
- January 8 – Harold Monro officially opens the Poetry Bookshop in London (opened for business November 1912). American poets Robert Frost and Ezra Pound will eventually meet here.
- June – The New Freewoman, a literary magazine, begins publication, but becomes defunct in December. Dora Marsden owns it; Rebecca West edits it at first, then Ezra Pound takes over as editor; it succeeds The Freewoman and will be succeeded by The Egoist.
- June 2 – English Poet Laureate Alfred Austin dies, succeeded by Robert Bridges on July 17.
- September – Founding of The Glebe, an American literary magazine edited by Alfred Kreymborg and Man Ray; it will cease publication in 1914 after 10 issues. Ezra Pound, having heard about the magazine from Kreymborg's friend John Cournos, sends Kreymborg the manuscript of Des Imagistes in the summer and this famous first anthology of Imagism is published as the fifth issue of The Glebe (February 1914).
- September 8 – W. B. Yeats' poem "September 1913" is published in The Irish Times during the Dublin Lock-out.
- November 14 – Rabindranath Tagore is awarded the Nobel Prize in Literature.
- December 15 – Ezra Pound (in London) writes to James Joyce (in Trieste) requesting some of his recent poems for The Egoist. Pound arrived in London by September to meet W. B. Yeats, whom he considers "the only poet worthy of serious study"; from this November until 1916, the two men winter in the Stone Cottage at Ashdown Forest, with Pound nominally acting as secretary to the older poet.
- Jose Martínez Ruiz, commonly known as Azorín, comes up with the name "Generation of '98" this year, referring to the novelists, poets, essayists, and philosophers active in Spain at the time of the Spanish–American War (1898) and alluding to the moral, political, and social crisis produced by Spain's defeat in that war. Writing mostly after 1910, the group reinvigorates Spanish letters, revives literary myths and breaks with classical schemes of literary genres. In politics, members of the movement often justify radicalism and rebellion.

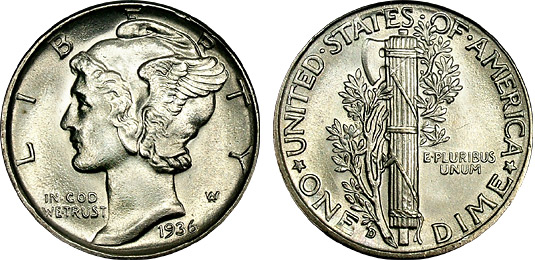
1936 Winged Liberty Head (Mercury) dime

- Wallace Stevens and his wife, Elsie, rent a New York City apartment from sculptor Adolph Weinman, who makes a bust of Elsie, whose image is used on the artist's 1916–1945 Mercury dime design.
- Norbert von Hellingrath begins publishing Friedrich Hölderlin's complete works (Sämtliche Werke: historisch-kritische Ausgabe, the "Berliner Ausgabe"), restoring his work to literary prominence.

== Works published in English ==
=== Australia ===
- Arthur H. Adams, The Collected Verses of Arthur H. Adams
- Christopher Brennan, Poems (1913)
- C. J. Dennis:
  - Backblock Ballads and Other Verses
  - "Wheat"
- Henry Lawson, For Australia and Other Poems
- John Shaw Neilson, "Song Be Delicate"
- Will H. Ogilvie, The Overlander and Other Verses

=== Canada ===
- Tom MacInnes, The Rhymes of a Rounder
- Marjorie Pickthall, The Drift of Pinions
- Varna Sheard, The Miracle and Other Poems
- Albert D. Watson, Love and the Universe, the Immortals and Other Poems

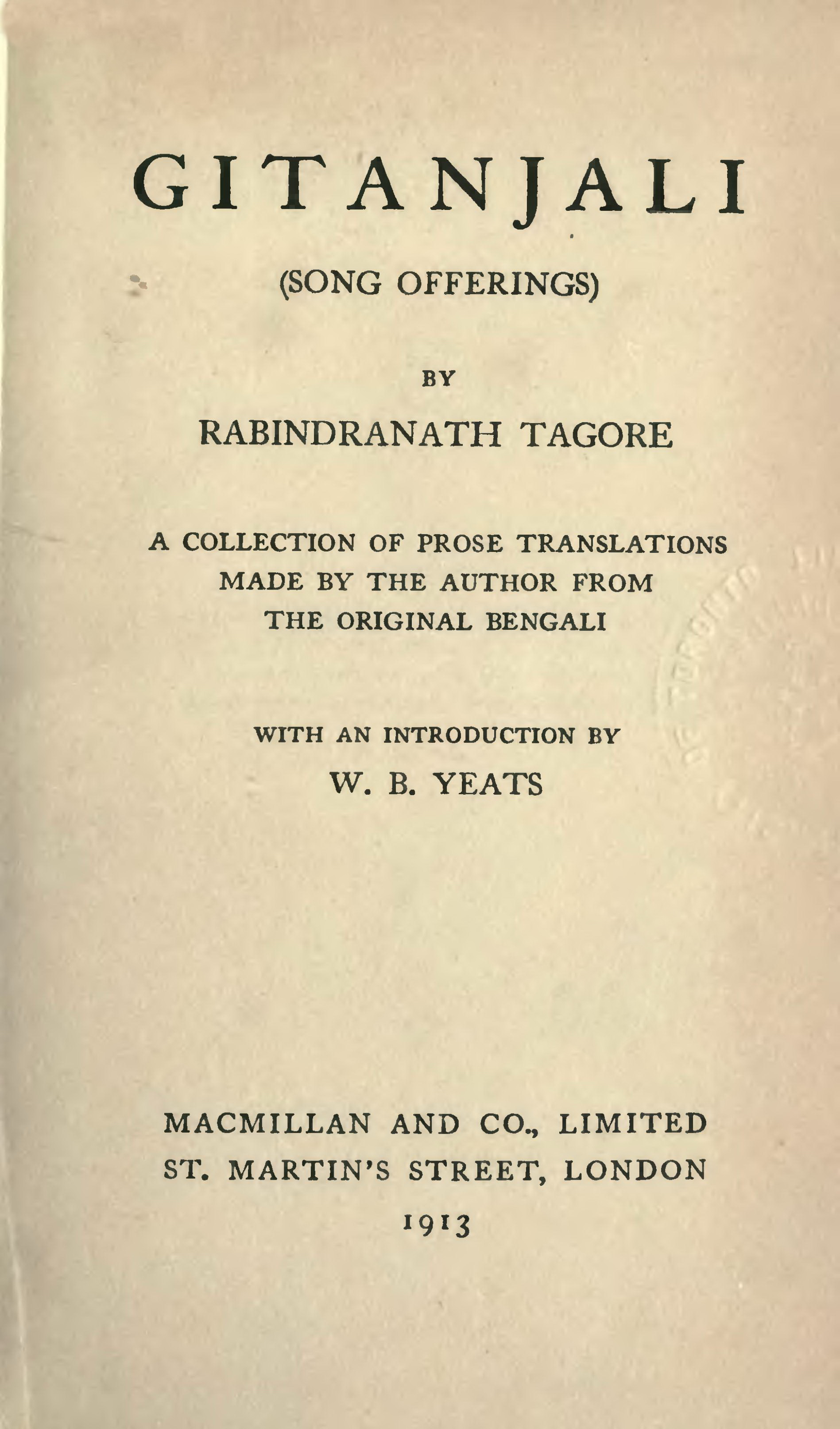
Title page of the 1913 Macmillan edition of Tagore's Gitanjali

=== United Kingdom ===
- Laurence Binyon, Auguries
- Joseph Campbell, Irishry
- W. H. Davies, Foliage
- Walter de la Mare, Peacock Pie: a book of rhymes
- John Drinkwater, Cromwell, and Other Poems
- Radclyffe Hall, Songs of Three Counties, and Other Poems
- D. H. Lawrence, Love Poems and Others
- Richard Le Gallienne, The Lonely Dancer, and Other Poems, English poet living at this time in the United States
- Winifred Mary Letts, Songs from Leinster, English-born poet resident in Ireland
- John Masefield, Dauber
- Alfred Noyes, Tales of the Mermaid Tavern
- Cecil Roberts, Phyllistrata
- George William Russell ("Æ"), Collected Poems (expanded editions published in 1919, 1926 and 1935)
- Siegfried Sassoon, The Daffodil Murderer
- Dora Sigerson, Madge Linsey, and Other Poems
- J. C. Squire, The Three Hills, and Other Poems
- Rabindranath Tagore, ' 'The Crescent Moon' ', lyrics, translated mostly from Bengali; Indian poetry in English
- Katharine Tynan, Irish Poems, Irish poet published in the United Kingdom
- William Carlos Williams, The Tempers, the second book of poetry by this American poet; his friend, Ezra Pound arranged to have it published in the United Kingdom
- W. B. Yeats, Poems Written in Discouragement, Irish poet published in the United Kingdom

=== United States ===
- Witter Bynner, Tiger
- Robert Frost, A Boy's Will
- Paul Laurence Dunbar, Complete Poems, published posthumously
- John Gould Fletcher:
  - Fire and Wine
  - Fool's Gold
  - The Book of Nature
  - The Dominant City
  - Visions of the Evening
- Joyce Kilmer, "Trees" first appears in the August issue of Poetry magazine, it was later included in Trees and Other Poems 1914
- Richard Le Gallienne, The Lonely Dancer, English poet living at this time in the United States
- Vachel Lindsay, General William Booth Enters into Heaven and Other Poems
- John Hall Wheelock, Love and Liberation
- William Carlos Williams, The Tempers, the second book of poetry by this American poet; his friend, Ezra Pound arranged to have it published in the United Kingdom.

=== Other in English ===
- Rabindranath Tagore, ' 'The Crescent Moon' ', lyrics, translated mostly from Bengali; Indian poetry in English
- Katharine Tynan, Irish Poems Irish poet published in the United Kingdom
- W. B. Yeats, Poems Written in Discouragement, Irish poet published in the United Kingdom

== Works published in other languages ==
=== France ===
Cover of Blaise Cendrars' La prose du Transsibérien et de la Petite Jehanne de France

- Guillaume Apollinaire, pen name of Wilhelm Apollinaris de Kostrowitzky, Alcools: Poemes 1898–1913, edited by Tristan Tzara; France
- Blaise Cendrars, La prose du Transsibérien et de la Petite Jehanne de France ("Prose of the Trans-Siberian and of Little Jehanne of France"), a collaborative artists' book with near abstract pochoir print by Sonia Delaunay-Terk
- Francis Jammes, Feuilles dans le vent
- Pierre Jean Jouve, Parler
- Valery Larbaud, Les Poésies de A. O. Barnabooth
- Charles Péguy, Ève

=== Indian subcontinent ===
Including all of the British colonies that later became India, Pakistan, Bangladesh, Sri Lanka and Nepal. Listed alphabetically by first name, regardless of surname:

==== Assamese language ====
- Chandra Kumar Agarwala, Pratima
- Hiteshwar Bar Barua, Tirotav Atma Balidan Kavya, narrative poem about the sacrifice of Jaymoti Kunwari for the sake of her husband, Gadadhar Singha, ruler of Assam from 1681 to 1696
- Lakshminath Bezbarua, Kadam Kali, inspired by the ballads of Assam

==== Bengali language ====
- Adipudi Somanatharavu, translator, Gitanjali Bengali poems by Rabindranath Tagore translated into Telugu
- Chittaranjan Das, Sagar Sangit, Bengali language, short verses, intensely religious, later translated into English by Sri Aurobindo
- Pramatha Chaudhuri, Sanet Pancasat, India, Bengali language

==== Indian poetry in other languages ====
- K. C. Kesava Pillai, Kesaviyam, India, Malayalam language
- Kilabhai Ghansyam, Meghdut, translation into Gujarati from the original Sanskrit of Meghudutam by Kalidasa
- Mohammad Abdul Majid, Caman-i-benazir, Urdu language
- Raja Shyama Kumar Tagore, Jarmani Kavyam, Sanskrit language, a poem on Germany
- Ulloor S. Parameswara Iyer, Umakeralam, a mahakavya, a type of Indian epic poem, India, Malayalam language
- Vakil Ahmad Shah Qureshi, Om-nama (incorporating Ghazalyat-e-Shastri), Kashmiri language

=== Other languages ===
- Delmira Agustini, Los cálices vacíos, pórtico de Rubén Darío ("Empty chalices"), Uruguay
- Stefan George, Der Stern des Bundes ("The Star of the Order"), Germany
- Marie Heiberg, Luule ("Poems"), Estonia
- Emmy Hennings, Äthergedichte ("Ether poems"), Germany
- Vicente Huidobro, Canciones en la noche ("Songs in the Night"), Chile
- Blanche Lamontagne-Beauregard, Visions gaspésiennes, French language Canada
- Lionel Léveillé (writing under the pseudonym Englebert Gallèze), La claire fontaine, French language Canada
- Georg Trakl, Gedichte ("Poems"), Austrian published in Germany
- Nik Welter, Hochofen, Luxembourg published in Germany
- Vladimir Mayakovsky, I [Я], Russia

== Births ==
Death years link to the corresponding "[year] in poetry" article:

- January 1 – Norman Rosten (died 1995), American poet, playwright and novelist
- January 19 – Rex Ingamells (died 1955), Australian
- February 10 – Charles Henri Ford (died 2002), American novelist, poet, filmmaker, photographer, and collage artist
- February 26 – George Barker (died 1991), English poet and author
- February 28 – Virginia Hamilton Adair, (died 2004), American poet
- March 4 – Sadako Kurihara 栗原貞子 (died 2005), poet who survives the Hiroshima nuclear holocaust and became known for her poems about her city
- March 16 – Carmelo Arden Quin, (died 2010), Uruguayan poet, political writer, painter, sculptor and co-founder of the international artistic movement "Madi"
- March 29 – R. S. Thomas (died 2000), Anglo-Welsh poet
- May 6 – Douglas Stewart (died 1985), Australian
- May 8 – Saima Harmaja, (died 1937), Finnish poet
- June 24 – Vincent Ferrini (died 2007), American writer and poet
- June 26 – Aimé Césaire (died 2008), Martinican Francophone poet, writer and politician
- July 10 – Salvador Espriu (died 1985), Spanish Catalan
- July 30 – John Blight (died 1995), Australian
- August 4 – Robert Hayden (died 1980), American poet, essayist, educator and Poet Laureate Consultant in Poetry to the Library of Congress
- September 16 – Dinesh Das (died 1985), Indian, Bengali-language
- September 25 – Seaforth Mackenzie (died 1955), Australian
- November 10 – Karl Shapiro died 2000), American
- December 7 (November 24 O.S.) – Kersti Merilaas, born Eugenia Moorberg (died 1986), Estonian
- December 8 – Delmore Schwartz (died 1966), American poet and short-story writer
- December 15 – Muriel Rukeyser (died 1980), American poet and political activist
- December 27 – Elizabeth Smart (died 1986), Canadian poet and novelist
- Also:
  - Appan M. A., Indian, Malayalam-language
  - James Boughton, American poet
  - Flexmore Hudson (died 1988), Australian
  - V. R. Kant (died 1990), Indian, Marathi-language
  - Bhatt Damodar Kesavaji, pen name Sudhansu (died 1983), Indian, Gujarati-language
  - Devandas Kishinani, "Azad", Indian, Sindhi-language
  - Ananta Pattanayak, Indian, Oriya-language
  - Bal Krisna Rav (died 1974), Indian, Hindi-language poet, editor and translator; edited the monthly ' 'Kadambini' '
  - Harumal Isardas Sadarangani, "Khadim", Indian, Sindhi-language poet and scholar
  - Upendra Thakur, "Mohan" (died 1980), Indian, Oriya-language

== Deaths ==
Birth years link to the corresponding "[year] in poetry" article:

- February 17 – Joaquin Miller (born 1837), American "Poet of the Sierras"
- March 7 – Pauline Johnson, also known as "E. Payuline Johnson" and "Tekahionwake" (born 1861), Canadian known for poems and performances celebrating her aboriginal heritage, including the frequently anthologized "The Song My Paddle Sings"
- May 17 – Dwijendralal Ray (born 1863), Indian, Bengali-language poet, playwright and musician known primarily for patriotic plays and songs as well as Hindu devotional lyrics
- June 2 – Alfred Austin (born 1835), English Poet Laureate of the United Kingdom
- June 29 – Martina Swafford (born 1845), American poet
- July 30 – Itō Sachio 伊藤佐千夫, pen name of Itō Kojirō (born 1864), Meiji period tanka poet and novelist
- August 1 (January 19 O.S.) – Lesya Ukrainka (born 1871), Ukrainian
- September 2 – Lucy H. Washington (born 1835), American poet and social reformer
- December 1 (November 18 O.S.) – Juhan Liiv (born 1864), Estonian
- December 5 – Ferdinand Dugué (born 1816), French poet and playwright
- Also:
  - Bhuban Chandra Barua pen name "Umesh Chandra Barua", (birth year uncertain, possibly 1890), Indian, Assamese-language poet
  - Kunjikuttan Thampuran (born 1865), Indian, Malayalam-language poet associated with the Kodungalloor School of poetry

== Awards and honors ==
- Nobel Prize in Literature: Rabindranath Tagore, partly for Gitanjali
- Newdigate Prize: Roy Ridley, Oxford
- Robert Bridges becomes British Poet Laureate

== See also ==
- List of years in poetry
- Ego-Futurism movement in Russian poetry
- Dymock poets
- Expressionism movement in German poetry
- Russian Futurism
- Silver Age of Russian Poetry
- Young Poland (Polish: Młoda Polska) modernist period in Polish arts and literature
- Poetry
