= 1910 in Australian literature =

This article presents a list of the historical events and publications of Australian literature during 1910.

== Books ==
- Mary Gaunt – The Uncounted Cost
- Fergus Hume – High Water Mark
- G. B. Lancaster – Jim of the Ranges
- Rosa Praed – Opal Fire
- Ambrose Pratt
  - A Daughter of the Bush
  - The Living Mummy
- Henry Handel Richardson – The Getting of Wisdom
- Ethel Turner – Fair Ines
- Lilian Turner – Three New Chum Girls
- Wong Shee Ping — The Poison of Polygamy
- Arthur Wright – Gambler's Gold

== Short stories ==
- Arthur Bayldon – The Tragedy Behind the Curtain and Other Stories
- James Francis Dwyer – "A Jungle Graduate"
- Henry Lawson – The Rising of the Court and Other Sketches in Prose and Verse
- Sumner Locke – "When Dawson Died"
- Steele Rudd
  - The Dashwoods
  - On an Australian Farm
- Thomas Edward Spencer – The Haunted Shanty and Other Stories

== Poetry ==
- E. J. Brady – Bush-Land Ballads
- C. J. Dennis – "An Old Master"
- Louis Esson – Bells and Bees: Verses
- Mary Gilmore – Marri'd and Other Verses
- Henry Lawson – The Skyline Riders and Other Verses
- John Shaw Neilson
  - "The Girl with the Black Hair"
  - "Surely God was a Lover"
  - "You, and Yellow Air"
- Bernard O'Dowd – "The Poet"

== Drama ==
- J. Le Gay Brereton – To-morrow
- Katharine Susannah Prichard – The Burglar

== Births ==
A list, ordered by date of birth (and, if the date is either unspecified or repeated, ordered alphabetically by surname) of births in 1910 of Australian literary figures, authors of written works or literature-related individuals follows, including year of death.

- 26 February – Paul White, missionary, evangelist, radio program host and author of the Jungle Doctor Series (died 1992)
- 21 March – Elizabeth Riddell, poet (died 1998)
- 21 June – Clive Sansom, poet and dramatist (died 1981)
- 22 July – Alan Moorehead, journalist (died 1983)
- 31 August – Joan Colebrook, journalist and writer (died 1991)
- 23 September – Joe Walker, novelist and newspaper editor (died 1971)

== Deaths ==
A list, ordered by date of death (and, if the date is either unspecified or repeated, ordered alphabetically by surname) of deaths in 1910 of Australian literary figures, authors of written works or literature-related individuals follows, including year of birth.

- 18 January – James Lister Cuthbertson, poet (born 1851)
- 3 April – Catherine Helen Spence, novelist (born 1825)

== See also ==
- 1910 in Australia
- 1910 in literature
- 1910 in poetry
- List of years in Australian literature
- List of years in literature
