= 1985 in poetry =

Nationality words link to articles with information on the nation's poetry or literature (for instance, Irish or France).

== Events ==
- January 16 - Canadian Poetry Association founded.
- May - The term "New Formalism" is first used in the article "The Yuppie Poet" in e AWP Newsletter in an attack on the poetry movement. The term is adopted as the name of the movement by those in it.
- November 11 - A memorial to sixteen English poets of World War I is unveiled in Poets' Corner of Westminster Abbey.
- A memorial to Hugh MacDiarmid is unveiled near his home at Langholm, Scotland.
- Boulevard magazine founded at St. Louis University by Richard W. Burgin.
- Influential Chinese literary magazine Tamen ("They/Them") founded with Han Dong as chief editor, with close collaboration of other Chinese writers, including Ding Dang, Yu Jian, Xiaojun, Su Tong, Naigu and Xiaohai. Nine issues will be published between 1985–1988 and 1993-1995 and in 2002 Tamen will be revived as a webzine.

== Works published in English ==
Listed by nation where the work was first published and again by the poet's native land, if different; substantially revised works listed separately:

=== Australia ===
- Robert Gray, Selected Poems 1963-1983
- Chris Wallace-Crabbe, The Amorous Cannibal, Oxford: Oxford University Press
- W. Wilde, et al., editors, Oxford Companion to Australian Literature (scholarship)

=== Canada ===
- Roo Borson, The Transparence of November / Snow, ISBN 0-919627-30-7 (with Kim Maltman) American-Canadian
- Matt Cohen, In Search of Leonardo
- Dorothy Livesay, Beyond War: The Poetry.
- Anne Michaels, The Weight of Oranges
- P. K. Page, The Glass Air: Selected Poems (an expanded edition published in 1991)
- Ajmer Rode, Blue Meditations, by a Punjabi poet living and published in Canada and writing in English; London, Ontario: Third Eye Publications, ISBN 0-919581-31-5
- Joe Rosenblatt, Poetry Hotel, Selected Poems (1963-1985). McClelland & Stewart.
- Duncan Campbell Scott.Powassan’s Drum: Selected Poems of Duncan Campbell Scott. Raymond Souster and Douglas Lochhead, eds. Ottawa: Tecumseh."
- Elizabeth Smart, In the Meantime
- Raymond Souster, Flight of the Roller-Coaster: Poems for Younger Readers. Ottawa: Oberon Press.
- Raymond Souster and James Deahl. Into This Dark Earth. Toronto: Unfinished Monument Press.

=== India, in English ===
- Kamala Das, The Anamalai Poems ( Poetry in English )
- Hari Mohan Prasad, Indian Poetry in English, New Delhi: Sterling Pub. Ltd.
- Ajmer Rode, Blue Meditations, by a Punjabi poet living and published in Canada and writing in English; Blue Meditations, London, Ontario: Third Eye Publications, ISBN 0-919581-31-5

=== Ireland ===
- Paul Durcan:
  - The Selected Paul Durcan, second edition, including "The Hat Factory", "Tullynoe: Tete-a-Tete in the Parish Priest's Parlour"
  - The Berlin Wall Cafe, including "the Haulier's Wife Meets Jesus on the Road Near Moone", and "Around the Corner from Francis Bacon"; Belfast: Blackstaff Press, Northern Ireland poet published in the United Kingdom
- John Ennis, The Burren Days, Oldcastle: The Gallery Press, ISBN 978-0-904011-88-3
- Seamus Heaney: From the Republic of Conscience, Amnesty International, Northern Ireland native at this time living in the United States
- Thomas Kinsella, Songs of the Psyche, Irish poet published in the United Kingdom
- Michael Longley, Poems 1963–1983, Northern Ireland poet published in the United Kingdom
- Richard Murphy, The Price of Stone, including "Morning Call"

=== New Zealand ===
- Ursula Bethell, Collected Poems, edited and with a substantial introduction by Vincent O'Sullivan, Auckland: Oxford University Press (posthumous)
- Alistair Campbell, Soul Traps, Pukerua Bay: Te Kotare Press
- Janet Charman, Marina Bachmann and Sue Fitchett, Drawing Together, New Women's Press
- Bob Orr, Red Trees
- Kendrick Smithyman, Stories About Wooden Keyboards, winner of the New Zealand Book Award for Poetry
- Ian Wedde and Harvey McQueen, editors, Penguin Book of New Zealand Verse, anthology, revised edition

=== United Kingdom ===
- James Berry (poet), Chain of Days
- Carol Ann Duffy, Standing Female Nude
- Douglas Dunn, Elegies
- Paul Durcan, The Berlin Wall Cafe, Belfast: Blackstaff Press, Northern Ireland poet published in the United Kingdom
- D. J. Enright, Instant Chronicles
- Roy Fuller:
  - New and Collected Poems 1934–1984, see also Collected Poems 1962
  - Subsequent to Summer
- Tony Harrison:
  - Dramatic Verse, 1973-85
  - The Fire Gap
  - V
- Seamus Heaney: From the Republic of Conscience, Amnesty International, Northern Ireland native at this time living in the United States
- John Heath-Stubbs, The Immolation of Aleph
- Thomas Kinsella, Songs of the Psyche, Irish poet published in the United Kingdom
- Liz Lochhead, True Confessions and New Cliches
- Michael Longley, Poems 1963–1983, Northern Ireland poet published in the United Kingdom
- Norman MacCaig, Collected Poems
- Derek Mahon, Antarctica,, Gallery Press, Northern Ireland poet published in the United Kingdom
- Peter Reading, Ukulele Music
- Peter Redgrove, The Man Named East, and Other New Poems
- Jeremy Reed, New
- Carol Rumens, Direct Dialling
- Lisa St Aubin de Terán, The High Place
- Stephen Spender:
  - Collected Poems 1928–1985
  - The Journals of Stephen Spender, 1939–83 (biographical)
- R.S. Thomas, Ingrowing Thoughts
- Hugo Williams, Writing Home
- Benjamin Zephaniah, The Dread Affair

=== United States ===
- John Ashbery, April Galleons
- Paul Blackburn, The Collected Poems of Paul Blackburn
- Joseph Payne Brennan, Sixty Selected Poems (The New Establishment Press)
- Raymond Carver, Where Water Comes Together With Other Water
- Maxine Chernoff, New Faces of 1952 (Ithaca House)
- Amy Clampitt, What the Light was Like
- Michael S. Harper, Healing Song for the Inner Ear
- Robert Hayden, Collected Poems (posthumously published)
- Seamus Heaney: From the Republic of Conscience, Amnesty International, Northern Ireland native at this time living in the United States
- William Logan, Difficulty
- James Merrill, Late Settings
- Lorine Niedecker, From This Condensery and The Granite Pail (posthumous)
- Grace Paley, Leaning Forward
- Mary Jo Salter, Henry Purcell in Japan, Knopf
- Gjertrud Schnackenberg, The Lamplit Answer

== Works published in other languages ==
Listed by nation where the work was first published and again by the poet's native land, if different; substantially revised works listed separately:

=== Denmark ===
- Niels Frank, ÿjeblikket, the author's first book of poetry
- Klaus Høeck, Jævndøgn ("Equinox"), with Asger Schnack, publisher: Schønberg; Denmark
- Søren Ulrik Thomsen, Mit lys brænder. Omrids af en ny poetik ("My candle is burning. Outline of a new poetics"), criticism; Denmark

=== French language ===
- Claude Esteban, Le Nom et la Demeure, Flammarion; France
- Abdellatif Laabi, Discours sur la colline arabe. L'Harmattan, Paris, Moroccan author writing in and published in France
- Jean-Guy Pilon, Comme eau retenue: poèmes 1954-1977, Montréal: l'Hexagone; Canada

=== Hungary ===
- György Petri, Azt hiszik

=== India ===
Listed in alphabetical order by first name:

- Amarjit Chandan, Kavitavaan, Navyug, Delhi; Punjabi-language
- Bernardino Evaristo Mendes, also known as B. E. Mendes, Konkani Sahitik Nibondh; Konkani-language* Jaya Mehta, Akashman Tarao Chup Chhe; Gujarati-language
- Kedarnath Singh, Pratinidhi Kavitayen’, Delhi: Rajkamal Prakashan; Hindi-language
- Nilmani Phookan, Nrityarata Prithivi, Guwahati, Assam: Barua Book Agency Assamese-language
- Thangjam Ibopishak Singh, Norok Patal Prithivi ("This Earth is Hell"), Imphal: V.I. Publication; Meitei language

=== Poland ===
- Juliusz Erazm Bolek, Teksty
- Ewa Lipska, Przechowalnia ciemnosci, ("Storage for Darkness"); Warsaw: Przedswit / Warszawska Oficyna Poetow i Malarzy
- Adam Zagajewski, Jechac do Lwowa ("To Travel to Lviv"), illustrations by Józef Czapski; London: Aneks

=== Spain ===
- Matilde Camus, Cristales como enigmas ("Glasses as enigma")

=== Other languages ===
- Christoph Buchwald, general editor, and Ursula Krechel, guest editor, Luchterhand Jahrbuch der Lyrik 1985 ("Luchterhand Poetry Yearbook 1985"), publisher: Luchterhand Literaturverlag; anthology
- Haim Gouri, Mahbarot Elul ("Summer's End"), Israeli writing in Hebrew
- Natalio Hernández, Xochikoskatl (Collar de flores, "floral necklace"), Mexican poet writing in Nahuatl
- Nizar Qabbani, Syrian, Arabic-language poet:
  - Love Does Not Stop at Red Lights
  - Insane Poems

== Awards and honors ==
=== Australia ===
- C. J. Dennis Prize for Poetry: Kevin Hart, Your Shadow; Rosemary Dobson, The Three Fates
- Kenneth Slessor Prize for Poetry, Kevin Hart, Your Shadow
- Mary Gilmore Prize: Doris Brett, The Truth about Unicorns

=== Canada ===
- Gerald Lampert Award: Paulette Jiles, Celestial Navigation
- 1985 Governor General's Awards: Fred Wah, Waiting for Saskatchewan (English); André Roy, Action writing (French)
- Pat Lowther Award: Paulette Jiles, Celestial Navigation
- Prix Émile-Nelligan: Anne-Marie Alonzo, Bleus de mine

=== United Kingdom ===
- Cholmondeley Award: Dannie Abse, Peter Redgrove, Brian Taylor
- Eric Gregory Award: Graham Mort, Adam Thorpe, Pippa Little, James Harpur, Simon North, Julian May

=== United States ===
- Agnes Lynch Starrett Poetry Prize: Liz Rosenberg, The Fire Music
- American Academy of Arts and Letters Gold Medal in Poetry, Robert Penn Warren
- AML Award for poetry to Emma Lou Thayne
- Bernard F. Connors Prize for Poetry: James Schuyler, "A Few Days"
- Consultant in Poetry to the Library of Congress (later the post would be called "Poet Laureate Consultant in Poetry to the Library of Congress"): Gwendolyn Brooks appointed this year.
- Frost Medal: Robert Penn Warren
- Rhysling Award:
  - Siv Cedering, A Letter from Caroline Herschel (1750-1848) (Long Form)
  - Bruce Boston, For Spacers Snarled in the Hair of Comets (Short Form)
- Pulitzer Prize for Poetry: Carolyn Kizer: Yin
- Whiting Awards (inaugural year): Douglas Crase, Jorie Graham, Linda Gregg, James Schuyler
- Fellowship of the Academy of American Poets: Amy Clampitt and Maxine Kumin

== Births ==
- September 28 – Helen Mort, English poet
- December 22 – Kae Tempest, English performance poet

== Deaths ==
Birth years link to the corresponding "[year] in poetry" article:

- January 16 – Robert Fitzgerald, 74 (born 1910), American poet and translator from classical languages
- January 30 – F. R. Scott, 85 (born 1899), Canadian poet and constitutional expert
- February 22 – Salvador Espriu, 71 (born 1913), Spanish Catalan poet
- March 30 – J. V. Cunningham (born 1911), American poet, literary critic and teacher
- April 17 – Basil Bunting, 85 (born 1900), English poet
- May 12 – Josephine Miles, 73 (born 1911), American poet and literary critic
- May 25 – Robert Nathan, 91, of kidney failure, American novelist and poet
- August 14 – Alfred Hayes, 74, of meningitis, English-born American writer of the labor song "Joe Hill"
- August 19 – Yamazaki Hōdai 山崎方代 (born 1914), Japanese, Shōwa period tanka poet
- September 22 – D. J. Opperman, 70, South African Afrikaans poet
- October 26 – Kikuko Kawakami 川上 喜久子 (born 1904), Japanese, Shōwa period novelist, short-story writer and poet, a woman
- October 31 – Nikos Engonopoulos, 81, Greek poet
- November 25 – Geoffrey Grigson, 80, English poet
- December 2 – Philip Larkin, 63, of throat cancer, English poet
- December 7 – Robert Graves, 90 (born 1895), English-born writer and poet
- December 22 – Vailoppilli Sreedhara Menon (born 1911), Indian, Malayalam-language poet

== See also ==
- Poetry
- List of years in poetry
- List of poetry awards
