= 1913 in Australian literature =

This article presents a list of the historical events and publications of Australian literature during 1913.

== Novels ==
- James Francis Dwyer — The Spotted Panther
- Vera Dwyer — With Beating Wings
- Norman Lindsay — A Curate in Bohemia
- Louise Mack
  - Attraction
  - The Marriage of Edward
- Dorothea Mackellar — Outlaw's Luck
- Ambrose Pratt
  - The Golden Kangaroo
  - Wolaroi's Cup
- Louis Stone — Betty Wayside
- Ethel Turner — The Secret of the Sea
- Lilian Turner — Stairways to the Stars

== Short stories ==
- John Arthur Barry — South Sea Shipmates
- Louis Becke — Bully Hayes: Buccaneer, and Other Stories
- Henry Lawson
  - "Grandfather's Courtship"
  - Triangles of Life and Other Stories

== Poetry ==
- Arthur H. Adams — The Collected Verses of Arthur H. Adams
- Christopher Brennan — Poems (1913)
- John Le Gay Brereton — "The Robe of Grass"
- Ada Cambridge — The Hand in the Dark and Other Poems
- C. J. Dennis
  - Backblock Ballads and Other Verses
  - "The Bridge Across the Crick"
  - "Spring Song of a Bloke"
  - "Wheat"
- Mary Gilmore — "The Sea-Sleep"
- Grant Hervey — Australian Yet and Other Verses
- Henry Lawson — For Australia and Other Poems
- Hugh McCrae — "Song of the Rain"
- John Shaw Neilson — "Song Be Delicate"
- Will H. Ogilvie — The Overlander and Other Verses
- Bertram Stevens and George Mackaness eds.
  - The Children's Treasury of Australian Verse
  - Selections from the Australian Poets

== Births ==
A list, ordered by date of birth (and, if the date is either unspecified or repeated, ordered alphabetically by surname) of births in 1913 of Australian literary figures, authors of written works or literature-related individuals follows, including year of death.

- 19 January — Rex Ingamells, poet (died 1955)
- 20 February – Mary Durack, novelist (died 1994)
- 6 May — Douglas Stewart, poet (died 1985)
- 30 July — John Blight, poet (died 1995)
- 2 August — Nancy Phelan, novelist (died 2008)
- 13 September — Donald Stuart, novelist whose works include stories with Aboriginal backgrounds and a series recounting his experience as a prisoner of war in Burma in World War II (died 1983)
- 25 September — Kenneth Mackenzie, poet and novelist (died 1955)
- 11 December — Mungo Ballardie MacCallum, journalist and novelist (died 1999)

Unknown date

- Elizabeth O'Conner, novelist (died 2000)

== Deaths ==
A list, ordered by date of death (and, if the date is either unspecified or repeated, ordered alphabetically by surname) of deaths in 1913 of Australian literary figures, authors of written works or literature-related individuals follows, including year of birth.

- 3 January — Garnet Walch, writer, dramatist, journalist and publisher (born 1843)
- 18 February — Louis Becke, short story writer and novelist (born 1855)
- 4 June — Ambrose Dyson, poet and artist (born 1876)

== See also ==
- 1913 in Australia
- 1913 in literature
- 1913 in poetry
- List of years in Australian literature
- List of years in literature
