= Frederick Richardson Sayers =

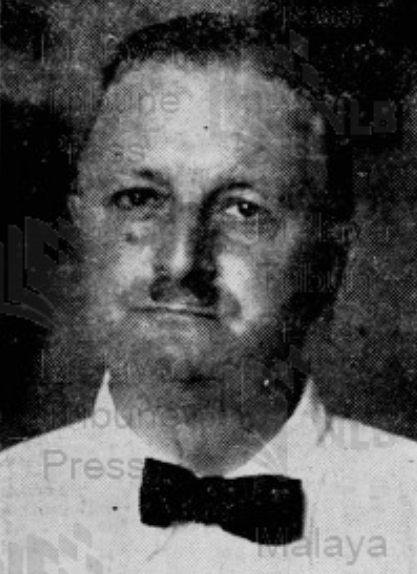
Sayers in 1935.

Frederick Richardson Sayers (4 September 1880 – 30 June 1935) was the Chief Health Officer of Singapore from 1928 to 1935.

== Early life and education ==
Sayers was born on 4 September 1880. He studied at the Rathmines School in Dublin, Ireland and then at the Trinity College Dublin of the University of Dublin.

== Career ==
Sayers was first appointed to the Malayan Medical Service in the Straits Settlements as a Medical Officer in May 1912, serving at the General Hospital in Penang. In the same year, he briefly acted as the Second Assistant Port Health Officer in Singapore. After working at the General Hospital, he became a Medical Officer at the District Hospital. By July of the following year, Sayers had been appointed the Port Health Officer of Penang. While in Penang, he also served as the Medical Officer in charge of the Leper Asylum on Jerejak Island. In February 1919, it was announced that Gilbert E. Brooke, then the Chief Health Officer of Singapore, would be going on leave at the end of March and that Sayers would be acting as Chief Health Officer in his place. He also acted as the Assistant Health Officer to the Rural Areas. In the same year, he became a lecturer of Public Health at the King Edward VII College of Medicine. He was again appointed the acting Chief Health Officer of Singapore in October 1920.

In February 1921, Sayers was appointed an acting Senior Health Officer for Penang. In July, it was announced that he was to be "an analyst within the limits of the Municipality of George Town, Penang." It was announced in July 1923 that Sayers was to act again as Chief Health Officer of Singapore for the next eight months as Brooke had gone on leave towards the end of the previous month. In March 1924, he was appointed a Medical Officer for Penang under the Registration of Schools Ordinance and the Sale of Food and Drugs Ordinance. He was again appointed the acting Chief Health Officer of Singapore in December 1926. In the same year, while on vacation, Sayers represented the Straits Settlements at the thirteenth International Sanitary Conference, held in Paris. In May 1927, Sayers was appointed the acting Senior Health Officer of the state of Perak. It was officially announced on 14 October that he would be officially appointed the Senior Health Officer of Perak.

Sayers was appointed the Chief Health Officer of Singapore in May 1928. As Chief Health Officer, he was appointed a member of the Rural Board of Singapore by April of the following year. He was also appointed the Registrar-General of Births and Deaths in the Straits Settlements. He was appointed to a joint Straits Settlements and Federated Malay States committee formed to control milk and ghee. In March 1935, it was announced that Sayers would soon be retiring as Chief Health Officer. He had been on leave since 1933. At a convocation of the King Edward VII College of Medicine, Sir Shenton Thomas, then Governor of the Straits Settlements, presented Sayers and fellow retiring college faculty members Charles Johnson Smith and John Richard Kay-Mouat with honorary diplomas. In May, a journalist of The Malaya Tribune praised the upkeep of the quarantine station on Saint John's Island and wrote, "Saint John's Island is a credit to Singapore and to Dr. F. R. Sayers and his department." Sayers received the King George V Silver Jubilee Medal in that month.

== Personal life and death ==
Sayers married Amy Eileen Ross of Waterford, Ireland on 28 July 1913 at the St. George's Church in Penang. His hobbies included tennis, swimming and photography.

After retiring as Chief Health Officer, Sayers was to leave the colony at the end of August on a vacation before returning to England. However, shortly before his retirement, he fell "seriously ill" and died at the Singapore General Hospital on 30 June. His remains were cremated at the Japanese crematorium on Yio Chu Kang Road.
