= 1910 in poetry =

If you can talk with crowds and keep your virtue,

Or walk with Kings—nor lose the common touch,
If neither foes nor loving friends can hurt you,
If all men count with you, but none too much:
If you can fill the unforgiving minute
With sixty seconds' worth of distance run,
Yours is the Earth and everything that's in it,

And—which is more—you'll be a Man, my son!

— closing lines of Rudyard Kipling's "If—", first published this year in Rewards and Fairies

Nationality words link to articles with information on the nation's poetry or literature (for instance, Irish or French).

== Events ==
- Oxford Poetry is founded as a literary magazine by publisher Basil Blackwell in England.

== Works published ==
=== Australia ===
- C. J. Dennis, "An Old Master"
- Mary Gilmore, Marri'd and Other Verses
- Henry Lawson, The Skyline Riders and Other Verses

=== Canada ===
- The Rev. James B. Dollard, also known as "Father Dollard", Poems
- Frederick George Scott, also known as "F. G. Scott", Collected Poems
- Tom MacInnes, In Amber Lands, mostly a reprint of Lonesome Bar and Other Poems 1909
- "Yukon Bill" [Kate Simpson Hayes], Derby Days in the Yukon.

=== United Kingdom ===
- Hilaire Belloc, Verses
- Frances Cornford, Poems
- W. H. Davies, Farewell to Poesy, and Other Pieces
- James Elroy Flecker, Thirty-Six Poems
- Ford Madox Ford, Songs from London
- Wilfrid Gibson, Daily Bread
- Laurence Hope [Violet (Adela Florence) Nicolson (suicide 1904)], editor, Indian Love Lyrics, London: Heinemann; anthology; Indian poetry in English, published in the United Kingdom
- Rudyard Kipling, Rewards and Fairies, short stories and poems, including "If—"
- Thomas MacDonagh, Songs of Myself, Irish poet published in Ireland
- John Masefield, Ballads and Poems
- Lady Margaret Sackville, editor, A Book of Verse by Living Women
- W. B. Yeats, Irish poet published in the United Kingdom:
  - The Green Helmet and other Poems
  - Poems: Second Series

=== United States ===
Baseball's Sad Lexicon
by Franklin Pierce Adams

These are the saddest of possible words:
"Tinker to Evers to Chance."
Trio of bear cubs, and fleeter than birds,
Tinker and Evers and Chance.
Ruthlessly pricking our gonfalon bubble,
Making a Giant hit into a double –
Words that are heavy with nothing but trouble:
"Tinker to Evers to Chance."

- Charles Follen Adams, Yawcob Strauss and Other Poems
- Franklin Pierce Adams, "Baseball's Sad Lexicon", also known as "Tinker to Evers to Chance" after its refrain; a popular baseball poem
- Robert Underwood Johnson, Saint-Gaudens, an Ode
- John A. Lomax, Cowboy Songs and Other Frontier Ballads
- Ezra Pound:
  - Provenca
  - The Spirit of Romance, criticism
- Edward Arlington Robinson, The Town Down the River, Charles Scribner's Sons
- George Santayana, Three Philosophical Poets: Lucretius, Dante, and Goethe, criticism
- George Sterling, “The Black Vulture”

=== Other in English ===
- Joseph Furtado, Lays of Old Goa, Indian poetry in English
- Laurence Hope [Violet (Adela Florence) Nicolson (suicide 1904)], editor, Indian Love Lyrics, London: Heinemann; anthology; Indian poetry in English, published in the United Kingdom
- W. B. Yeats, Irish poet published in the United Kingdom:
  - The Green Helmet and other Poems
  - Poems: Second Series

== Works published in other languages ==
=== France ===
- Paul Claudel, Cinq Grandes Odes, France
- Jean Cocteau, Le prince frivole
- Alphonse Métérié, Carnets
- Charles Péguy, Mystère de la charité de Jeanne d'Arc
- Saint-John Perse, Elèges

=== Other languages ===
- Delmira Agustini, Cantos de la mañana, Uruguay
- Ernst Enno, Hallid laulud, Estonia
- Gurajada Appa Rao, Mutyala Saralu, Indian poetry, Telugu-language (surname: Gurajada)
- Takuboku Ishikawa, Ichiakuno suna ("A Handful of Sand"), Japanese (surname: Ishikawa)
- Maria Konopnicka, Pan Balcer w Brazylii, Polish
- Peider Lansel, editor, La musa ladina, anthology of Romansh language Swiss poets
- Rabindranath Tagore, Gitanjali, Bengali

== Awards and honors ==
- Newdigate Prize (University of Oxford) – Charles Bewley, "Atlantis"
- Chancellor's Prize for Latin Verse Composition (University of Oxford) – Ronald Knox

== Births ==
- January 11 – Nikos Kavvadias (died 1975), Greek
- March 21 – Elizabeth Riddell (died 1998), Australian
- August 14 – Nathan Alterman (died 1970), Israeli poet, journalist and translator
- August 30 – Màrius Torres (died 1942), Catalan Spanish poet
- October 30 – Miguel Hernández (died 1942), Spanish poet
- November 10 – Máirtín Ó Direáin (died 1988), Irish poet writing in the Irish language
- November 14 – Norman MacCaig (died 1996) Scottish poet
- November 20 – Pauli Murray (Anna Pauline (Pauli) Murray; died 1985), African American civil-rights advocate, feminist, lawyer, writer, poet, teacher and ordained Episcopal priest
- November 21? – Frank Eyre (died 1988), English-born Australian publisher
- December 19 – Jean Genet (died 1986), French novelist, playwright and poet
- December 27 – Charles Olson (died 1970), American poet
- December 30 – Paul Bowles (died 1999), American poet, author, composer and translator
- Also – R. D. Murphy, Australian poet

== Deaths ==
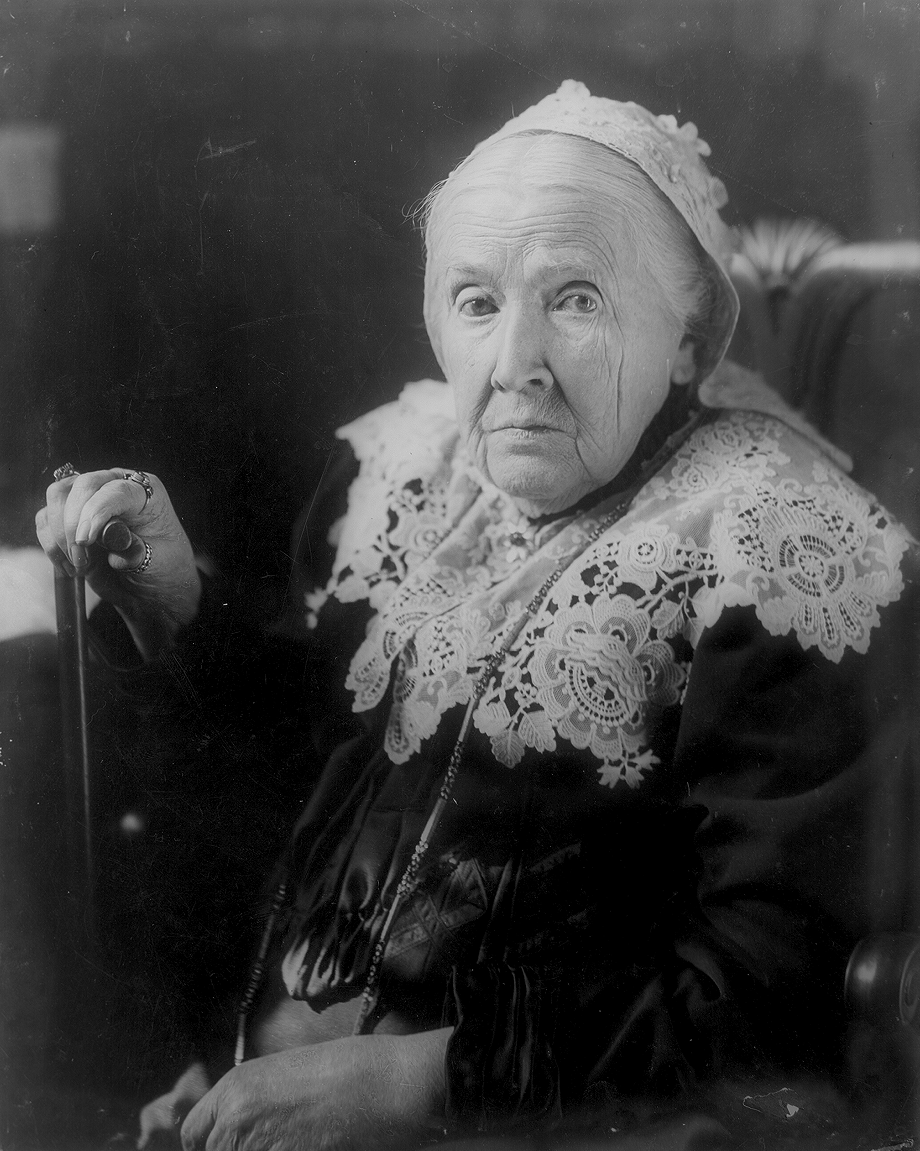
Julia Ward Howe, from a picture taken April 27, 1908

- January 15 – Gilbert E. Brooke (born 1873), English medical officer and poet in East Asia
- January 18 – James Cuthbertson (born 1851), Australian
- January 29 – Arthur Munby (born 1828), English diarist, poet and lawyer
- April 19 – Anna Laetitia Waring (born 1823), Welsh-born poet and hymnodist
- October 17:
  - William Vaughn Moody (born 1869), American dramatist and poet
  - Julia Ward Howe, 91, American poet best known as the author of "Battle Hymn of the Republic"
- November 13 – Isabel Richey (born 1858), American
- December 30 – Thomas Edward Spencer (born 1845), Australian
- Also – Augusta Bristol (born 1835), American

== See also ==
- Poetry
- List of years in poetry
- Silver Age of Russian Poetry
- Acmeist poetry movement in Russian poetry
- Ego-Futurism movement in Russian poetry
- Expressionism movement in German poetry
- Young Poland (Polish: Młoda Polska) modernist period in Polish arts and literature
