= 1873 in poetry =

This article covers 1873 in poetry. Nationality words link to articles with information on the nation's poetry or literature (for instance, Irish or France).

== Events ==
- July 10 – Paul Verlaine shoots at and wounds Arthur Rimbaud in Brussels.

== Works published in English ==
=== United Kingdom ===
- Alexander Anderson, A Song of Labour, and Other Poems
- Robert Bridges, Poems by Robert Bridges (see also Poems 1879, 1880)
- Robert Browning, Red Cotton Night-Cap Country; or, Turf and Towers
- Edward Carpenter, Narcissus, and Other Poems
- Austin Dobson, Vignettes in Rhyme
- Dora Greenwell, Songs of Salvation
- William Morris, Love is Enough; or, The Freeing of Pharamond
- Emily Pfeiffer, Gerard's Monument, and Other Poems

=== United States ===
- Will Carleton, Farm Ballads
- William Dean Howells, Poems
- Henry Wadsworth Longfellow, Aftermath
- Bayard Taylor, Lars: A Pastoral of Norway

== Works published in other languages ==
=== France ===
- Tristan Corbière, Les amours jaunes
- Arthur Rimbaud, Une Saison en Enfer ("A Season in Hell")
- Théodore de Banville, Trente-six ballades joyeuses, Paris: Lemerre; France
- Paul Verlaine:
  - Romances sans paroles
  - Art poétique, criticism

== Births ==
Death years link to the corresponding "[year] in poetry" article:

- January 9 – Hayim Nahman Bialik, חיים נחמן ביאליק (died 1934), Russian-born Hebrew poet
- January 7 – Charles Péguy (killed in action 1914), French poet and essayist
- February 26 – Tekkan Yosano, 与謝野 鉄幹, pen-name of Yosano Hiroshi (died 1935), Japanese late Meiji period, Taishō and early Shōwa period author and poet; husband of author Yosano Akiko; grandfather of cabinet minister and politician Kaoru Yosano (surname: Yosano)
- March 28 – Gilbert E. Brooke (died 1936), French-born English poet and colonial medical officer
- April 12 – Kumaran Asan (died 1924), Indian, Malayalam-language poet
- April 25 – Walter De la Mare (died 1956), English poet, short story writer and novelist
- August 3 – Alexander Posey (drowned 1908), Native American poet, journalist, humorist and politician
- August 13 – Dora Adele Shoemaker (died 1962), American poet and playwright
- October 10 – George Cabot Lodge (died 1909) American
- December 7 – Willa Cather (died 1947), American novelist and poet
- December 11 – Tilly Aston (died 1947), Australian
- December 12 – Lola Ridge (died 1941), Irish American anarchist and modernist poet, and editor of avant-garde, feminist and Marxist publications
- December 29 – Ovid Densusianu ("Ervin") (died 1938), Romanian poet, philologist, linguist, folklorist, literary historian, critic, academic and journalist
- Undated
  - George Clarke, Canadian
  - Clementine Krämer, née Cahnmann (died 1942 in Theresienstadt concentration camp), German poet and short-story writer

== Deaths ==
Birth years link to the corresponding "[year] in poetry" article:

- April 26 – Vladimir Benediktov (born 1807), Russian poet and translator
- May 9 – Frederick Goddard Tuckerman (born 1821), American
- May 22 – Alessandro Manzoni (born 1785), Italian poet and novelist
- June 29 – Michael Madhusudan Dutt (মাইকেল মধুসূদন দত্ত also spelled "Maikel Modhushudôn Dôtto", "Datta" or "Dutta"), born Madhusudan Dutt (born 1824–1873), Indian, English-language poet and dramatist
- July 13 – Caroline Clive, also known as "Caroline Wigley Clive", 71 (born 1801), English poet and author, dies in fire
- October 27 – Janet Hamilton (born 1795), Scottish poet
- December 24 – Rangga Warsita (born 1802), Javanese
- Undated
  - Kasiprasad Ghose, Indian
  - Dimitrios Paparrigopoulos (born 1843), Greek

== See also ==
- 19th century in poetry
- 19th century in literature
- List of years in poetry
- List of years in literature
- Victorian literature
- French literature of the 19th century
- Poetry
