= Bryan, Bryan, Bryan, Bryan =

1919 poem by Vachel Lindsay

- by Nicholas Vachel Lindsay
- Written: August 1919
- Country: United States
- Language: English

"Bryan, Bryan, Bryan, Bryan" is a lyric poem by American poet Vachel Lindsay. Written in August 1919, the poem recounts the dramatic rise and defeat of U.S. presidential candidate William Jennings Bryan during the 1896 presidential campaign. The Sun, a New York City newspaper, first published the poem, and the work appeared in Lindsay's 1920 collection The Golden Whales of California And Other Rhymes in the American Language. The poem focuses on the initial flowering of hope and later widespread despair among Bryan's ardent supporters through the campaign's electoral vicissitudes.

== Summary ==
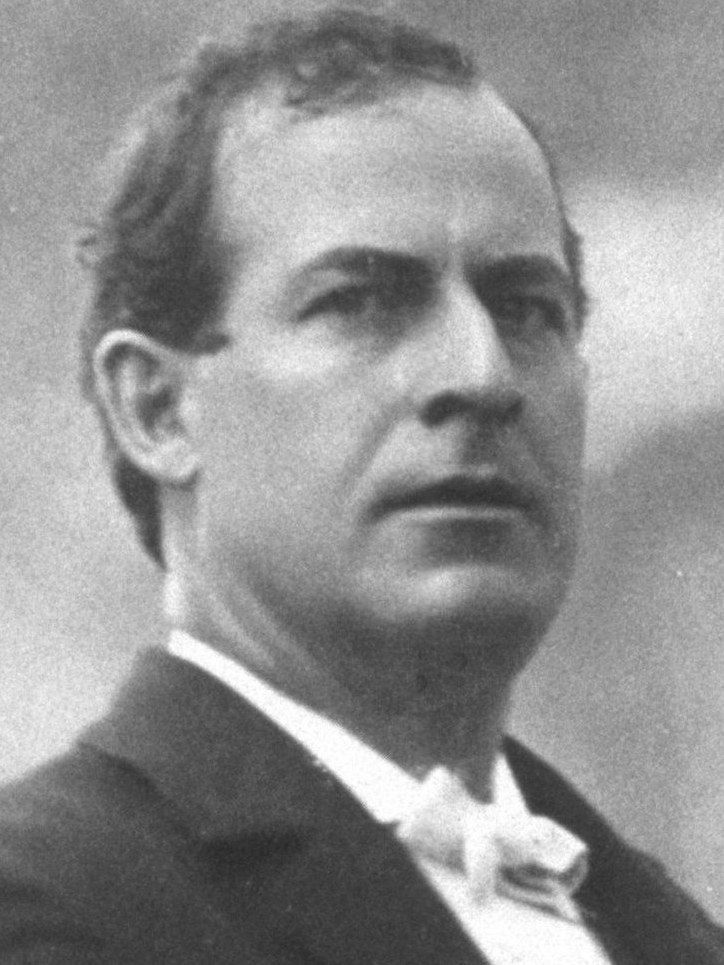
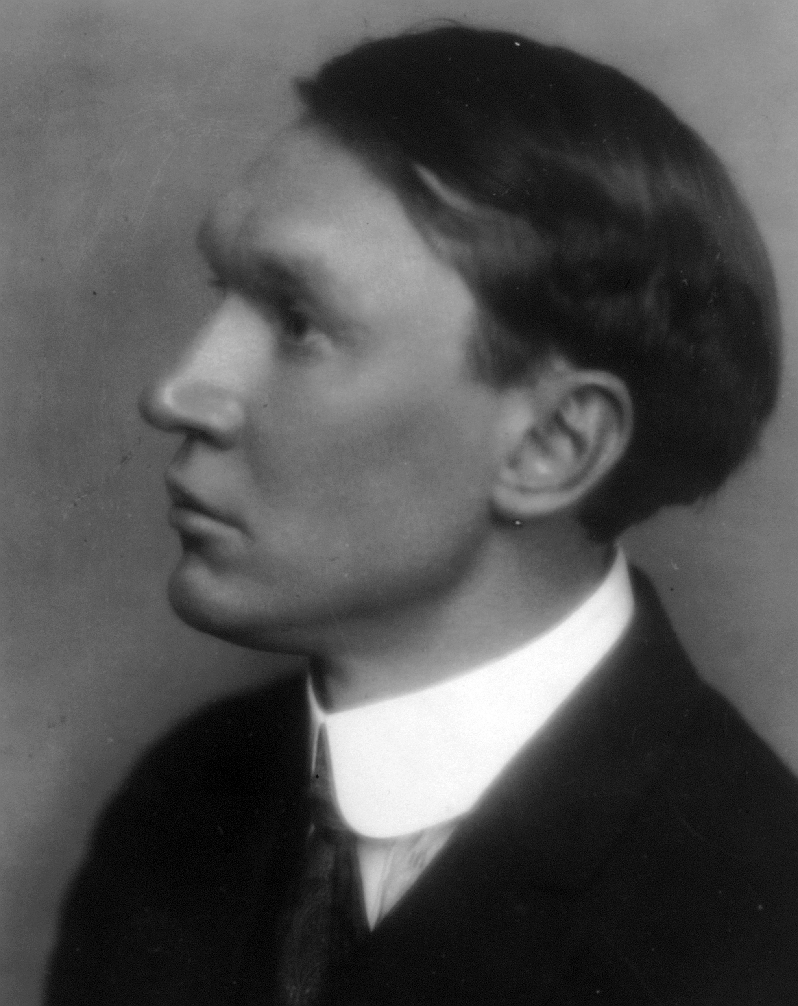
William Jennings Bryan and poet Vachel Lindsay

The long parade rolled on. I stood by my best girl.
She was a cool young citizen, with wise and laughing eyes.
With my necktie by my ear, I was stepping on my dear,
But she kept like a pattern, without a shaken curl.
She wore in her hair a brave prairie rose.
Her gold chums cut her, for that was not the pose.
No Gibson Girl would wear it in that fresh way.
But we were fairy Democrats, and this was our day.

— Vachel Lindsay, "Bryan, Bryan, Bryan, Bryan" (1919)

The poem chronicles William Jennings Bryan's 1896 presidential campaign as seen through the eyes of an idealistic sixteen-year-old boy who supports the Democratic Party candidate. While attending a Springfield, Illinois political rally with his best girl, the young lovers hear the Cross of Gold speech recited by Bryan, a former United States Representative from Nebraska.

In his famous speech, Bryan supported bimetallism or "free silver", which he argued would bring prosperity to the nation, and he decried the gold standard, proclaiming that "you shall not crucify mankind upon a cross of gold". Bryan's oft-recited speech, which became one of the most famous political addresses in American history, wins the boy's loyalty.

In Lindsay's poem, Bryan's defeat through political intrigue by the Republican Party crushes the boy's spirited idealism. Lindsay depicts the 1896 election outcome as an ignominious victory of large financial institutions and East Coast elites such as John Pierpont Morgan over the poorer regions and interest groups favoring Bryan's bimetallist proposals, such as the American Midwest and hardscrabble farmers.

The poem lists and comments on many of the key political figures of the 1896 election, including the retiring presidential incumbent Grover Cleveland, the victorious candidate William McKinley, and McKinley's innovative campaign manager Mark Hanna. The poem also references contemporary 1890s cultural archetypes such as the Gibson Girl.
