= An Old Master =

1910 poem by C. J. Dennis

- by C. J. Dennis
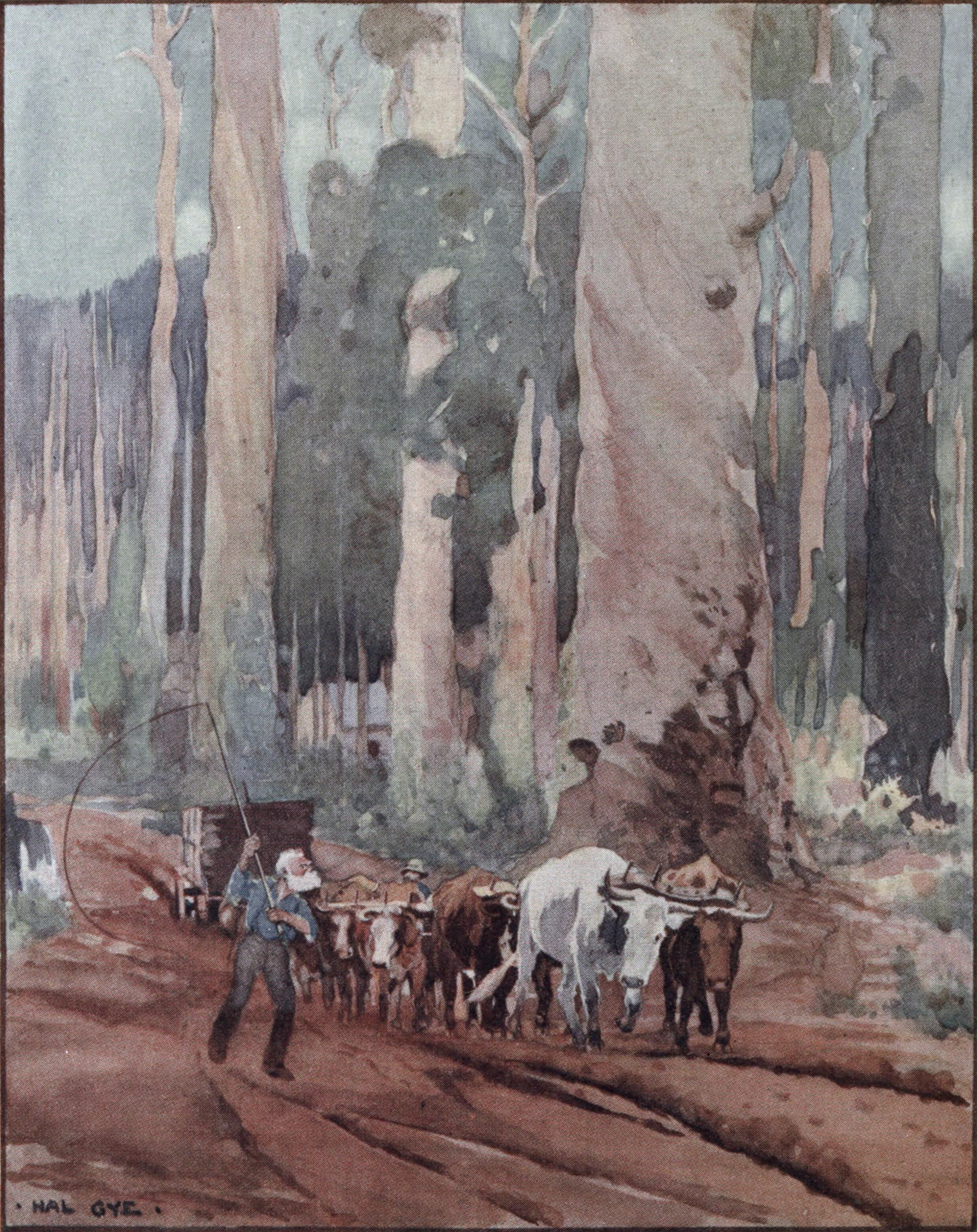
- Frontispiece to Backblock Ballads and Later Verses (1918) illustrating the poem
- Written: 1910
- First published in: The Bulletin
- Illustrator: Hal Gye
- Country: Australia
- Language: English
- Publication date: 4 August 1910

Full text
- Backblock Ballads and Later Verses/An Old Master at Wikisource

"An Old Master" is a poem by Australian poet C. J. Dennis. It was first published in The Bulletin magazine on 4 August 1910, and later in the poet's poetry collection Backblock Ballads and Other Verses (1913). The poem depicts the problem faced by a bullocky when his team gets stuck in thick mud.

== Outline ==
In a review of the poet's collection, Backblock Ballads and Later Verses, the reviewer in Young Witness described the poem as follows: ".. [it] conveys to the reader the power wielded by the old bullock driver, who, by his eloquence in hard swearing, could get more work out of a team than any of the gentle Annie variety of puncher of the present day. The team, on this occasion, was hopelessly bogged, bogged over the axles down to the bed. Bullock whip had no effect on the team, and they stood there chewing their cud, refusing to budge. An old pensioner, who lived in a hut on the roadside, seeing the dilemma, took the whip, and for a while the atmosphere in the vicinity went blue from the oaths that flew from the old fellow, who had not exhausted his vocabulary when the bullocks bent to their yoke, and lifted the waggon from the gluepot. He was 'An Old Master'."

== Analysis ==
A reviewer in The Telegraph (Brisbane) noted: " Mr. Dennis's work is not confined to the rhyming in slang, which were the sole attraction of some of his earlier and lucrative efforts. "An Old Master," with which the volume opens, stands out as one of Mr. Dennis's best."

== Further publications ==
- Backblock Ballads and Other Verses by C. J. Dennis (1913)
- Backblock Ballads and Later Verses by C. J. Dennis (1918)
- Old Ballads from the Bush edited by Bill Scott (1987)
- Selected Works of C. J. Dennis by C. J. Dennis (1988)
- Favourite Poems of C. J. Dennis by C. J. Dennis (1989)
- Anthology of Bullock Poetry edited by Janice Downes (2006)
- Australian Poetry Since 1788 edited by Geoffrey Lehmann and Robert Gray (2011)

== See also ==
- 1910 in poetry
- 1910 in literature
- 1910 in Australian literature
- Australian literature
