= The Golden Book of Springfield =

1920 novel by Vachel Lindsay

First edition (publ.The Macmillan Company)

The Golden Book of Springfield is a mystic, utopian book by American poet Vachel Lindsay. It is the only extended, narrative work of prose fiction written by Lindsay. Written from 1904 to 1918 and published in 1920, it has historically been classified as a work of utopian fiction. The Golden Book of Springfield is a story about Lindsay's hometown of Springfield, Illinois in 1918 and in 2018, when residents of the city work to transform the city into a utopian paradise-city.

In Lindsay's narrative, social and religious awakenings initiated by the citizens and spiritual influences lead to the transformation of Springfield - and more broadly, America - into a "practical City of God." Writes Lindsay, "This reasonable, non-miraculous millennium is much in the mind of my neighbor, and he tells me again and again of a vision that he has of Springfield a hundred years hence."

In a May 1918 letter to his then-married former sweetheart, Sara Teasdale, Lindsay expressed the importance of what he had inscribed into The Golden Book:

The Golden Book will probably be ready by Christmas. That is, written. That means it will not appear before next spring. I hate to be so slow, but my prose will not be hustled. I am making it the one thought of my life, and hope when it is done, it will be the one book of my life.

== Plot ==
The Golden Book of Springfield is framed as a series of visions of the future, experienced both by members of "'The Prognosticators' Club"', and later by Lindsay, who shifts to writing in the first person. It reads much like a dream journal throughout; Lindsay was well known to experience intense religious visions throughout his life.

=== The Prognosticators' Club ===
The book opens in 1920 with a gathering of the Prognosticators’ Club, which consists of, among others, a Campbellite minister, a Jewish boy, a black woman, and a skeptic, who offer a vision of Springfield in 2018 in prose derived from such varied sources as the Bible, Swedenborg, and Marx. The Prognosticators meet to discuss their visions of a modern Springfield achieving improvements in areas such as education, civility, technology, and spirituality.

=== The Arrival of The Golden Book of Springfield ===
The Golden Book of Springfield describes in many different voices the arrival of the fictional The Golden Book of Springfield, first describing this event through the eyes of David Carson, the Campbellite minister of the Prognosticator's Club who imagines himself "reborn three or four generations in the future."

We behold with him how a book of air, gleaming with spiritual gold, comes flying in through the walls as though they were but shadows. It is a book open as it soars, and every fluttering page is richly bordered and illuminated. It has wings of black, and above them wings of azure. Long feathers radiate from the whirring, soaring pennons. The book circles above the heads of the congregation. From the sky comes music incredibly sweet. The book flies toward the altar, where St. Friend finds himself standing. The wings fade. This day moves with rapid breath. The congregation has been trooping in as the visitant from the world of spirit-wonder has been settling into its own holy place on the altar.

=== The Flying Machine Riots ===
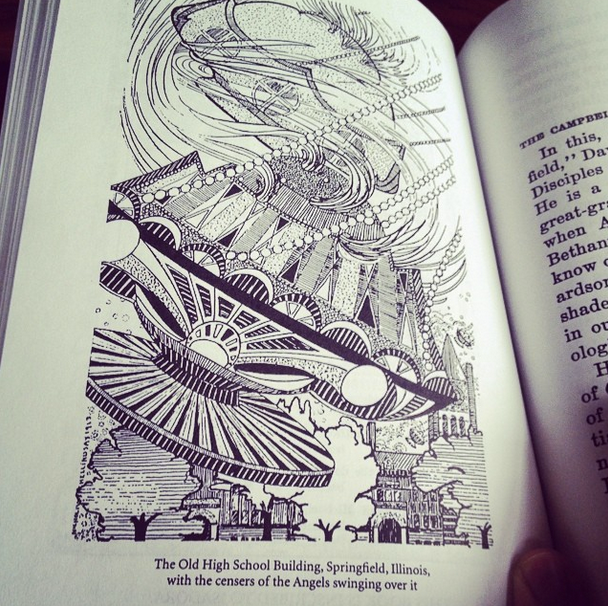
Drawing by Vachel - the first page of the Golden Book. UFOs?

The major conflict in The Golden Book of Springfield revolves around the "Flying Machine Riots" Lindsay summarizes the conflict as such:

"Chapter IX: Tempest in a Teapot over whether People with Buried Gold Shall Monopolize the Flying Privilege"

Lindsay tells the story of the monopolization of "flying machines," (Note: see Lindsay's poem The Empty Boats.) and the quick resolution of the issue by means of cooperation and peaceful discourse. St. Friend, among others, leads the public through the hidden conflict, and tells the people of their future - in which they travel to the stars in "airships of the mind."

=== St. Friend and the Church of Springfield ===
St. Friend is known as the "Giver of Bread," and is the religious reformer who unites all the religions of the world into "The Church of Springfield", or "The Church of the Plant and the Flower."

In the capital of Illinois, in this year of grace, St. Friend is a healer of the body and soul. He is more of a philosopher than the fuming Black Hawk Boone, that is, he has a cooler disposition. Yet Boone heals by hard maxims, given with that lovely fruit, the Amaranth-Apple. St. Friend heals by sermons and prayers and the pictured parables, the rituals envisaged and illuminated in the celebration of the Office of the Blessed Bread.

The Church of Springfield is incarnated as a "blessed community of faith" with no "fences of creed." St. Friend describes it as such:

"The Church of Springfield has come. It is the sunlit grass of this park; it is this Illinois sky... It will begin with sheltered faiths and will not contradict or undermine any."

In the same speech St. Friend delivers his vision of the events occurring, and the bright future he envisions for Springfield:

"The voices of the children will be as noble as the discourses of the prairie winds that catch our tree boughs at sunset. Every house will be as delicate and subtle as the ferny hollows of the Sangamon. The convert will name many birds that will come at this call and he will feed them crumbs of this Blessed Bread in friendship. When Springfield has partaken of this manna for a generation, all things will become new. Leavening thoughts will come from all the street corners. Novel fancies will come from the coffee houses. The conferences and colloquies of fallible men will take on something of the aspect of the meetings of the inspired souls of Heaven. We walk our plain path! We eat our plain bread in a rare fellowship! Therefore all things become eternal. The Church of Springfield, the church of this sunlit grass, the church of a million days and nights, is proclaimed from the steps of the Cathedral of St. Peter and St. Paul this day."

=== Redemption ===
In Chapter 3, Lindsay mythologizes the history of Springfield, Illinois, describing Hunter Kelly's pact with the Devil:

At last, when the lads returned from the war with Germany, and the girls returned from Red Cross work, and the like, in the summer of 1919, and the city began to take on glory both visible and invisible, Hunter Kelly said to the Devil: "I will now trust my town to go on. At last they are eating of the Apple Amaranth, which they thought was poison. They are even transplanting it." Thereupon Hunter Kelly drove the Devil away with the great pickaxe and spade, the same which had often dug the hunter from the ground. From this pickaxe on, the story was entirely new to the screen, and much of it new to the audience. Kelly then built himself a cell in Heaven out of old and broken fragments of forgotten palaces in the far jungles. There he wrote The Golden Book for our little city far below. By day he lived as that boy of Springfield who grew up as Saint Scribe of the Shrines, and established the discipline and ritual of The One Hundred Shrines of the World. He was rumored among a few of us to be the reincarnation of Hunter Kelly. He became the first teacher of St. Friend, who wore his mantle well after him. And now he is pictured, in many a dazzling flame-like color, throwing down from the window of his cell in heaven, this very hour of All Saint's Day, The Golden Book of Springfield. All this is the first intimation to Gwendolyn Charles that stranger things than we know may happen in heaven and on earth.

=== Ascension ===
In Chapter XV Lindsay describes how "when I am my American self the Thibetan boy takes me beyond the North Star and shows me the true Buddha.": This tale describes the experience of cosmic consciousness, a focal point of the New Age, or Golden Age movement, and the central tenet of Tibetan buddhism. This experience is, according to Lindsay, the means by which "the body of Christ, the whole human race, will be raised from the dead."

July 13: — Today I meet the Thibetan Boy in Coe's Book Store. We are both rather aimlessly turning over the magazines, and, after I have observed his idleness awhile, I take him out for a walk and say: "Why do you look at me when you pass, with your eyes a story untold?" All the while I have walked the streets of this New Springfield, you have looked at me so. He answers slowly, almost whispering: — "Your fathers came from the ancient Christian world. My fathers came from the more ancient Buddhist world. Christ is my master but I cannot deny that Buddha is my friend. This is the hour for friends. Come with me." We walk north on Mulberry Boulevard, past the House of the Man from Singapore, and then west on Carpenter toward a little highway that finally joins the great Northwest Road. But we have not gone far on the Great Northwest Road till we flash past the Gothic double walls of our city. The Thibetan Boy takes me, in one instant, to the far edge of Space and Time, way beyond the North Star and its dandelions. And as we stand on the shaking shore of Space and Time we see and hear, rolling in from Chaos, endless smoke and glory and darkness and dissolving foam. Standing beside us, like a superb Gandhara sculpture that has taken on life is that Prince Siddartha who was the founder of Buddhism. He stands in that aspect he had, while still a citizen and householder, and twenty-four centuries before his green glass libel cursed mankind. Before us is, indeed, a vision of Buddha the dreamer, superb, thoroughbred, in all the jewels of his tribe. It is the hour before he took chariot and drove forth from home. We are back in that hour when he looked upon all things, and saw them as a dissolving foam, the hour before he set forth for his victory over this crumbling universe. His eyes are fixed upon those waves that roll in forever, that keep their forms an instant, and are gone for all time: some of men, some of wraiths and gods, some of planets and comets and suns. He turns around and beckons and over the sand comes Channa, the superb charioteer, and the horses of that chariot are nobler than the horses of the sun. Prince Siddartha is in the chariot in an instant and they drive out into that sea and the wheels of that chariot ride the waves. Those horses are like lightning, climbing waves that are like hills and mountains, till chariot, horses, and men all are veiled by the endless smoke and glory and darkness and dissolving foam. The Thibetan boy says to me: "It is the 'Great Going Forth from Home,' and thus Buddha becomes a conquerer [sic], and Chaos and the Universe are put beneath him." But the star chimes behind us are ringing new tunes and we are back in our city again, leaving Prince Siddartha to conquer what he will.

== Context ==
Vachel Lindsay (1879–1931) is often referred to as the most intensely romantic American poet of his generation. Notably, Lindsay's career and personal life took a downturn after publication of The Golden Book in 1920. After rising in popularity during the 1910s for his rhythmic, musical brand of poetry performance, the poet published his utopian vision and expected his career to turn in a similar direction. Though British critics praised the work, The Golden Book received little to no critical attention in the United States, as American readers dismissed the work as "tedious and incomprehensible." Lindsay was forced to continue performing his poems across the country to support his family. Vachel's inability to turn his audiences’ focus towards the future, along with his deteriorating health and personal life, led to a severe decline that culminated in Lindsay's suicide in 1931.

In 1999, the Charles H. Kerr Publishing Company reprinted The Golden Book, along with a preface by William Furry and an extended introduction by Ron Sakolsky. The Kerr Company's synopsis is as follows:

Vachel Lindsay (1879–1931) was the most intensely romantic US poet of his generation. Less well known is the fact that Lindsay was also a radical critic of the white supremacy, greed, misery, brutality, ugliness and emptiness inherent in US capitalist culture. His only novel, The Golden Book - now back in print after over 80 years of shameful neglect - is a relentless dreamer's all-out assault on the stupidity and bigotry of Main Street USA. Lindsay's Luciferian lyricism, incantatory and even shamanic; the carnivalesque enthusiasm and humor that he called the 'higher vaudeville'; and of course that zany, jubilant, self-contradictory mysticism that was all his own are amply evident in this radically nonconformist dream of the future. In The Golden Book, the coffee houses, movie theaters, streets and parks of Springfield in the 'Mystic Year' 2018 are the setting for a valiant struggle to transform a village dominated by shady politicians, lynch-mobs, commercialism and cocaine into a new paradise. Ron Sakolsky's superb introduction, the most detailed examination yet of Lindsay's 'Johnny Appleseed utopianism', explores The Golden Book as a radical response to the Springfield Race Riot of 1908; relates the book to the utopias of Fourier, Ruskin, Bellamy, and others; and traces Lindsay's involvement in Chicago radicalism in the 1910s, as well as his affinities with anarchism, feminism, Black liberation, World War I, and such poet radicals as Blake, Lautreamont, the surrealists, Langston Hughes and the Beats.

== Thematic elements ==
=== Religious message ===
The overarching messages of both The Golden Book of Springfield and the fictional The Golden Book of Springfield are that of religious unity. The book opens with mention of the "Early Campbellites", followers of Thomas and Alexander Campbell.

Campbell, in our eyes, was the American pioneer theologian. He was devoted to the union of the churches of Christendom. He pleaded that all disciples of Christ call themselves "simply" Christians, and unite on those symbols and ordinances which Christendom has in common.

Throughout the book, Lindsay incorporates aspects from nearly all the religions of the world. He promotes the "Pilgrimage of the Hundred Shrines of the Hundred Religions" and writes of the influence of "Thibetan" philosophies on St. Friend and the Church of Springfield, noting the importance of these teachings in the ascension of humanity to Heaven.

=== War with Singapore ===
A major conflict in The Golden Book of Springfield is a war of the United States against Singapore, a nation incriminated for its worship of the Green Glass/Cocaine Buddha, but more broadly, their focus on materialism and cocaine.
