= Charles Follen Adams =

American poet

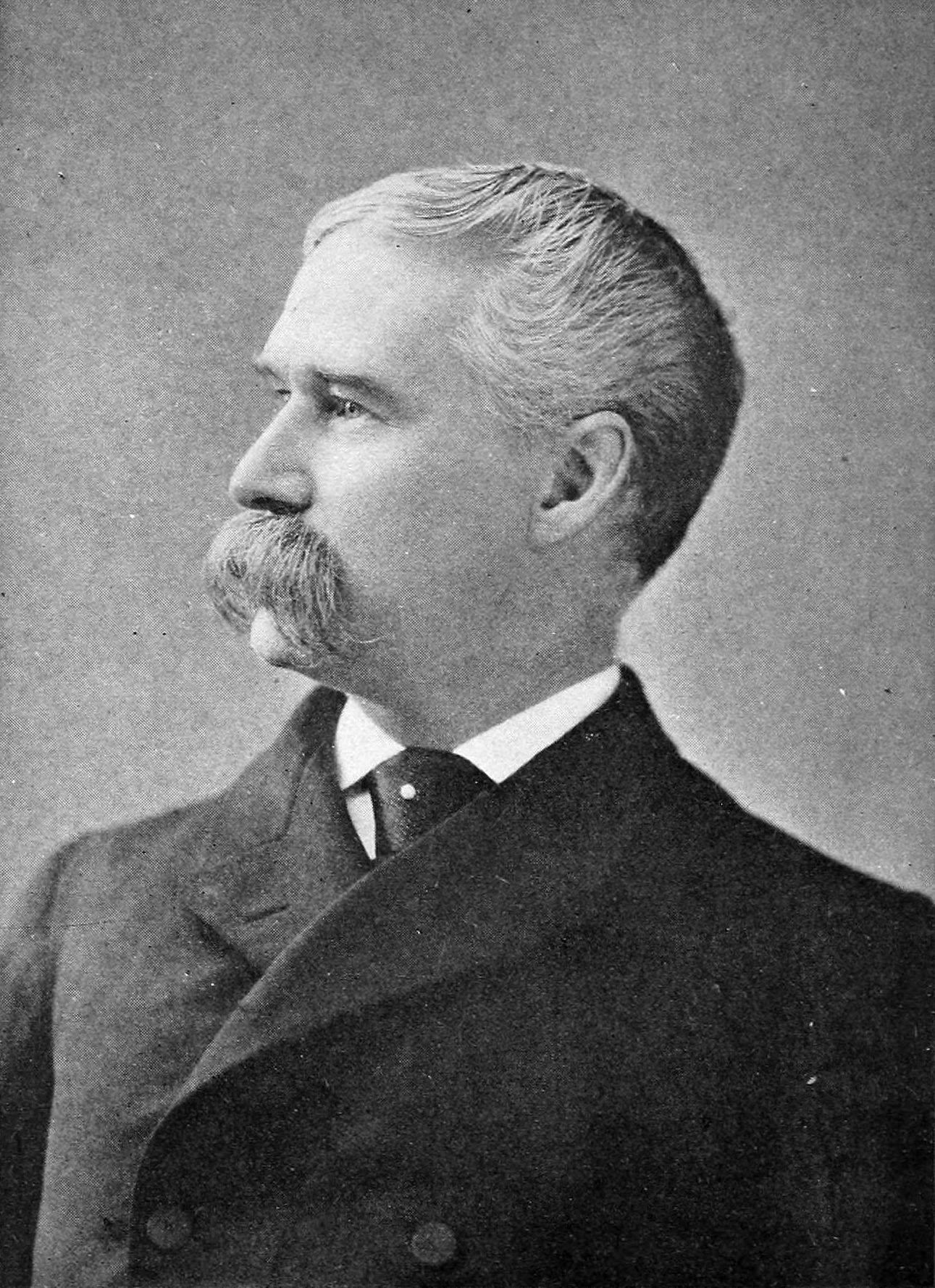
- Charles F. Adams (published 1910)
- Born: April 21, 1842; Dorchester, Massachusetts, U.S.
- Died: March 8, 1918 (aged 75); Roxbury, Massachusetts, U.S.
- Occupation: poet
- Writing career
- Language: English
- Subjects: Adams enlisted in the 13th Massachusetts Infantry during the American Civil War. He was wounded in action at Gettysburg, and taken as a prisoner of war.
- Notable works: 1878: Leedle Yawcob Strauss, and Other Poems; 1885: Mother's Doughnuts; 1886: Cut, Cut Behind; 1887: Dialect Ballads; 1910: Yawcob Strauss, and Other Poems

Signature
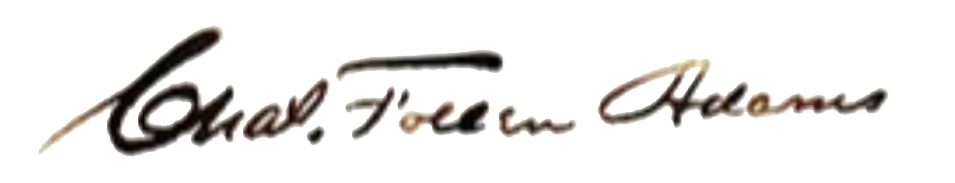

Charles Follen Adams (April 21, 1842 – March 8, 1918) was an American poet.

== Biography ==
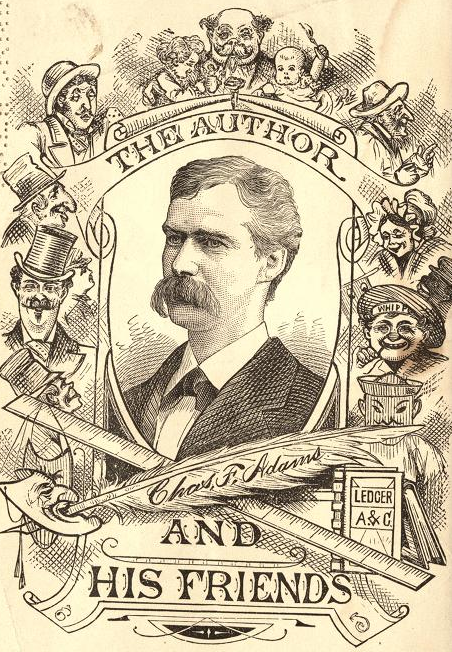
1878 portrait of Adams

Adams was born at Dorchester, Massachusetts, April 21, 1842. He came from revolutionary ancestors, being a descendant of Samuel Adams, as well as of Hannah Dustin, of Haverhill, Massachusetts. He was the son of Ira and Mary Elizabeth Adams, née Senter. He had 9 siblings, and was the youngest of all of them.

He received a common school education, and at the age of fifteen entered into mercantile pursuits. During the American Civil War, at age 22, Adams enlisted in the 13th Massachusetts Infantry. He was wounded in action at Gettysburg, and taken as a prisoner of war. On his release from prison, he was detailed for hospital duty.

In 1864 he returned to Boston and once more engaged in mercantile business. He was married to Hattie Louise on October 11, 1870 in Boston. The couple had two children, Charles Mills and Ella Paige Adams. In 1872, he began writing humorous verses for periodicals and newspapers in a burlesque broken-English imitation of Pennsylvania German dialect. His first published work was "The Puzzled Dutchman" which appeared in Our Young Folks.

Adams died at his home in Roxbury on March 8, 1918.

== Works ==
- 1878: Leedle Yawcob Strauss, and Other Poems
- 1885: Mother's Doughnuts
- 1886: "Cut, Cut Behind!"
- 1887: Dialect Ballads
- 1910: Yawcob Strauss, and Other Poems
