= Greta Pratt =

American photographer (born 1960)

- Known for: Photography

Greta Pratt is an American photographer whose primary interests are American identity, history and myth. She is the author of four books of photographs, Using History (Steidl, 2005) and In Search of the Corn Queen (Smithsonian American Art Museum, 1994) The Wavers (Blue Sky Books 2014) and Nineteen Lincolns (Peanut Press 2020). Pratt's work is represented in major public and private collections, including the Smithsonian American Art Museum: Smithsonian Institution, The Museum of Fine Arts, Houston, Museum of Contemporary Photography, Portland (Oregon) Art Museum, and Minneapolis Institute of Art. Pratt served as photography bureau chief of Reuters International in New York City. Her photographs have been featured in Art in America, The New York Times Magazine and The New Yorker.

== Career ==
Pratt has made a practice of documenting staged American history. Her series Nineteen Lincolns features members of the Association of Lincoln Presenters, a membership organization for Abraham Lincoln impersonators. It is intended to celebrate one of the most iconic elements of the bedrock of American history and put a quirky modern twist on it. Nineteen Lincolns has been on view in solo and group shows across the country since 2007. Her book Using History is an accurate depiction of her photographic universe, which is the intersection where American past meets American present. Pratt often uses clever juxtapositions of photos to tell her tale of how Americans incorporate their country's past to explain their attitudes to the present.

Pratt's work has a clear connection with that of Martin Parr, both using hyper-saturated color to slyly capture the peculiarities of how everyday people represent themselves and their roots.

In 2024, Pratt received a Guggenheim Fellowship.

== Education ==
Pratt received her BFA in photography from the University of Minnesota and her MFA in from the State University of New York at New Paltz.

== Books ==
- In Search of the Corn Queen (Smithsonian National Museum of American Art, 1994)
- Using History (Göttingen, Germany: Steidl, 2005.)
- The Wavers (Blue Sky Books 2014)
- Nineteen Lincolns (Peanut Press 2020)

== Quotes about Pratt's work ==
“…Everyone is trying to connect to the past but the past is always fiction. How history is told reveals much more about the people and time period that are telling it than about history itself.” “This book is a collection of photographs about history perceived, about how we look at ourselves and others, about how we recreate and reaffirm the American experience, about how we continue to live with, to rationalize, and to atone for the lingering spirit of place….Pratt's photographs help create an understanding of a special form of vernacular storytelling, of acting out and dressing up the past. History as we remember it emerges from her photographs. Perhaps it could more correctly be labeled history as we want it to be remembered or, even better, as we re-create and relive it. As the American novelist Willa Cather reminds us, "Memory is better than reality." “What Pratt catches here is not merely anachronism or irony…What you see here is the attempt by ordinary people – nonhistorians, that is – to capture history in a form that makes it locally communally tangible – history as shared terrain…There is an idea in most of these faces, though. The idea is continuity with forebears, with first principles, with a larger conception of the time horizon than everyday life usually affords."
