= Gambler's Gold (novel) =

1910 novel by Australian author Arthur Wright

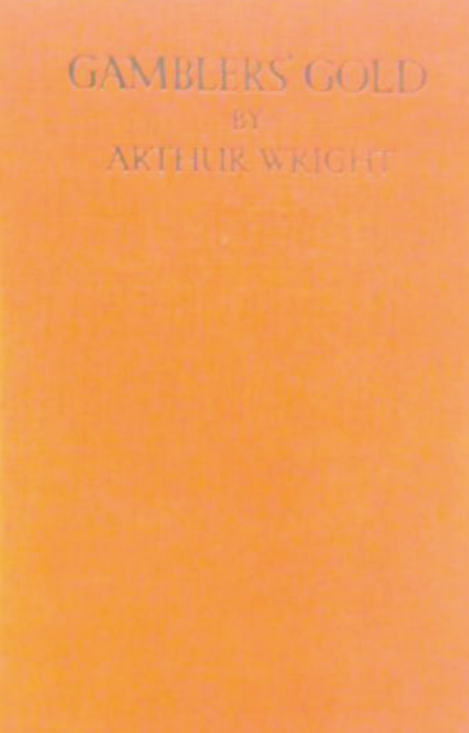
- Author: Arthur Wright
- Language: English
- Genre: Novel
- Publisher: The Arrow newspaper
- Publication date: 1910
- Publication place: Australia
- Media type: Print
- Pages: 191 pp.

Gambler's Gold is a 1910 novel by the Australian author Arthur Wright originally serialised in The Arrow newspaper (published in Sydney, New South Wales) in 12 weekly instalments between 19 February and 7 May 1910. It was later published in book form.

== Synopsis ==
Two men, who are good friends, fall in love with the same woman. One of the men is successful and works as a squatter. He eventually marries the woman, and they have a daughter together. Tragically, the squatter accidentally kills his wife while attempting to strike his friend. As the years pass, the squatter is tormented by remorse, while the friend develops feelings for the squatter's daughter, who, in turn, is in love with one of her father's shearers.

== Critical reception ==
The Daily Telegraph (Sydney) called this novel "an unusually well written Australian story", going on to add "There are some picturesque descriptions of racing events, and a grimly realistic account of a 'two-up' school in Sydney. The story is well told, and is an excellent specimen of its class."

The Freeman's Journal noted that the author "has employed most of the elements that go to the make-up of a melodramatic thriller." They also commented that "the reader is introduced to constancy, weakness, virtue and villainy, romance and sordidness, the seamy side of horse-racing, a 'two-up' school, a pak-a-pu 'joint,' and many other phases of modern city life."

== Publication history ==
After the novel's serialisation in The Arrow newspaper in 1910 it was reprinted as follows:

- 1911 New South Wales Bookstall Company, Australia
- 1911 George Newnes, London, UK
- 1919 New South Wales Bookstall Company, Australia
- 1921 New South Wales Bookstall Company, Australia
- 1923 George Newnes, London, UK
- 1924 New South Wales Bookstall Company, Australia

It was also included in a collection of four novels by the author titled Four Complete Novels, George Newnes 1931.

== Film adaptation ==
The novel was adapted into a silent film with the same title and released on 17 November 1911. It is considered a lost film.

== See also ==
- 1910 in Australian literature
