= Wheat (poem) =

1913 poem by Australian poet C. J. Dennis

- by C. J. Dennis
- First published in: Backblock Ballads and Other Verses
- Country: Australia
- Language: English
- Publication date: 1913
- Lines: 72

Full text
- Backblock Ballads and Later Verses/Wheat at Wikisource

"Wheat" (1913) is a poem by Australian poet C. J. Dennis.

It was originally published in the poet's collection Backblock Ballads and Other Verses in 1913, and was subsequently reprinted in a number of Australian newspapers and poetry anthologies.

== Critical reception ==
In his essay titled "The Shadow on the Field : Literature and Ecology in the Western Australian Wheatbelt" Tony Hughes-d'Aeth noted that, after Federation in 1901, there was "a perceptible shift in the forms of imaginative investment in rural practices, with a greater emphasis on the productive feats of the grain farmer and the role this had in nation-building." The poetry of the time began to reflect this change and he picks out this poem by Dennis as a prime example. "For Dennis, wheat farming is primarily a therapeutic alternative to modern life. The honest toil of the crop farmer is an antidote to the stresses of urban capitalism, with its ever-present threats of financial and psychological collapse...The 'sowin' ' and 'growin' ' place the farmer out of the dulling cycle of consumerism and into the habit of life that is closer to both the rhythms of nature and the potency of productive capitalism."

== Publication history ==
After the poem's initial publication in Backblock Ballads and Other Verses it was reprinted as follows:

- The Weekly Times Annual, 4 November 1916
- Selected Works of C. J. Dennis by C. J. Dennis, Angus and Robertson, 1988
- Favourite Poems of C. J. Dennis by C. J. Dennis, Child and Associates, 1989
- An Anthology of Australian Poetry to 1920 edited by John Kinsella, University of Western Australia Library, 2007
- Australia's Beating Heart : An Illustrated Anthology of Classic Bush Poetry edited by Melanie Hall and Susan Carcary, Australian Geographic, 2020

And in many other newspapers.

== See also ==
- 1913 in Australian literature
- 1913 in poetry
