= Association of Lincoln Presenters =

Organization for Abraham Lincoln impersonators

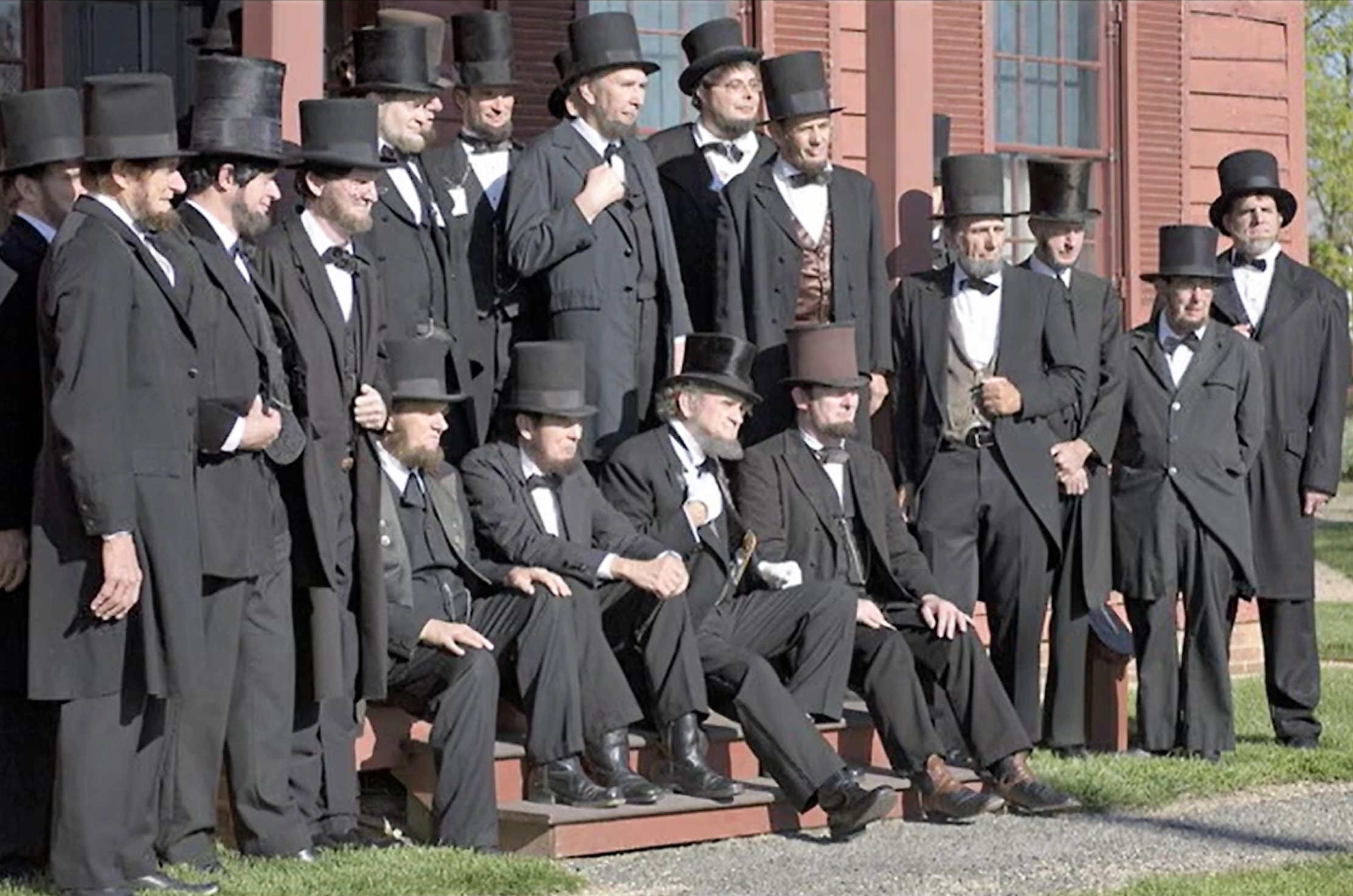
- Meeting of the Association of Lincoln Presenters in 2014
- Named after: Abraham Lincoln
- Formation: 1990
- Founder: Dan Bassuk
- Founded at: Whitehouse, New Jersey, United States
- Type: Nonprofit
- Purpose: Historical society
- President: Stanley Wernz
- Website: lincolnpresenters.com

The Association of Lincoln Presenters is a membership organization founded by Dan Bassuk in 1990. It was established as a members' society for impersonators of 16th president of the United States, Abraham Lincoln. The group has been the subject of a feature-length documentary and a photography exhibition by Greta Pratt.

== History and members ==
The Association of Lincoln Presenters (ALP) was founded by literature professor and Lincoln impersonator Dan Bassuk in 1990 in Whitehouse, New Jersey. New members were recruited via newspaper advertisements. By 1994, the organization's membership had grown to 45, six of whom participated in the televised Lincoln–Douglas debate reenactments on the public affairs network C-SPAN. The inaugural ALP conference took place in Lexington, Kentucky the following year and was attended by 34 impersonators. This became an annual event, visiting towns and cities around the US often chosen for their historical significance: the 2013 conference took place in Columbus, Ohio, where Lincoln briefly lay in state following his assassination in 1865; while the 2018 event was held in Freeport, Illinois, one of the locations of the original Lincoln–Douglas debates. The ALP celebrated its 25th annual conference in 2019 in Dawsonville, Georgia.

As of 2022, the group's membership comprises more than 220 reenactors, with representatives from 40 of the 50 US states. Besides Abraham Lincoln, ALP members also portray his wife, Mary Todd Lincoln, as well as other notable contemporary figures including Ulysses S. Grant and Harriet Beecher Stowe. As impersonators, ALP members generally wear paraphernalia associated with Lincoln such as black coats, stovepipe hats and chinstrap beards. Members of the group have appeared as Lincoln in various settings, including educational events, historical reenactments, weddings and acting roles.

== Mottos ==
The ALP has had several official mottos since its establishment. The first, "Now he belongs to the stages", used from the group's founding in 1990 until 1999, was a deliberate misquote of the "Now he belongs to the ages" line uttered by Edwin Stanton following Lincoln's death. A portion of the membership disapproved of the slogan, which was eventually replaced by the pun "Ready, Willing and Abe L.", referring to the group members' availability to appear at public events. By 2003, the ALP had adopted its third motto, "Would I Might Rouse the Lincoln in You All", a line taken from the poem "Lincoln" by Vachel Lindsay.

== Media coverage ==
In 2008, the group and its members were the subject of a feature-length documentary. Being Lincoln: Men With Hats, directed by Nashville-based film maker Elvis Wilson, followed long-serving ALP member Dennis Boggs as he helps newcomer John Mansfield begin his career as a Lincoln presenter. The idea behind the documentary came from Wilson's wife, Victoria Radford, who had learned about the group several years earlier while writing a book about the real Lincoln. The film aired on the Documentary Channel and Showtime.

Photographer Greta Pratt attended four ALP conferences, including the 2012 conference in Decatur, Illinois, taking photographs of the group's members as part of her Nineteen Lincolns project. The collection was exhibited at the Candela Gallery in Richmond, Virginia in 2012, and later at the Chrysler Museum of Art in 2015.
