= Kim Maltman =

Canadian poet and physicist (born 1951)

Kim Maltman (born 1951) is a Canadian poet and physicist who lives in Toronto, Ontario. He is a professor of applied mathematics at York University and pursues research in theoretical nuclear/particle physics. He is serving as a judge for the 2019 Griffin Poetry Prize.

== Works ==
- The Country of the Mapmakers (1977), ISBN 0-920110-24-X
- The Sicknesses of Hats (1982), ISBN 0-86492-024-5
- Branch Lines (1982), ISBN 0-920066-50-X
- Softened Violence (1984), ISBN 0-86495-042-X
- The Transparence of November / Snow (1985), ISBN 0-919627-30-7 (with Roo Borson)
- Technologies/Installations (1990), ISBN 0-919626-46-7
- Introduction to the Introduction to Wang Wei (2000), ISBN 1-894078-09-8 (by Pain Not Bread)
