= Marri'd and Other Verses =

1910 poetry collection by Mary Gilmore

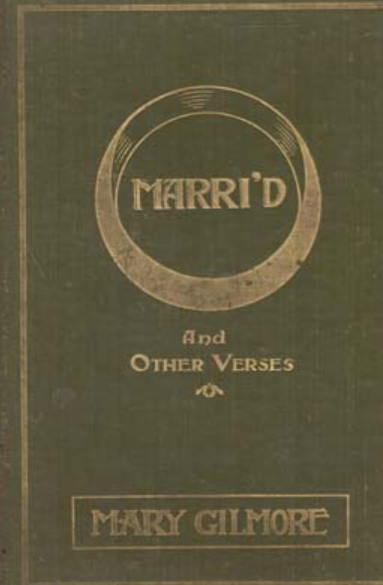
- Author: Mary Gilmore
- Language: English
- Genre: Poetry collection
- Publisher: George Robertson and Co.
- Publication date: 1910
- Publication place: Australia
- Media type: Print
- Pages: 146 pp
- Preceded by: Two Songs
- Followed by: The Tale Inks

Marri'd and Other Verses is a poetry collection by Australian poet Mary Gilmore, published by George Robertson and Co., in 1910. It was the author's debut poetry collection.

The first edition contains 105 poems, some of which had been published previously in various newspapers and poetry publications.

== Dedication ==
- Dedication: "To my father, my husband, and my son : For these three loved me."

== Contents ==
- "Marri'd"
- "The Lovin' Word"
- "Cupid Lost Himself To-Day"
- "By the Glenelg sequence
- "The Woman"
- "I Gang Na Mair t' Lecture Ha'"
- "The Lover"
- "You Send Me, Dear, a Rose"
- "Strange, How the Heart Will Leap"
- "You Will Think of Me Sometimes, Dear"
- "Dat Boy Billy"
- "In Casterton"
- "Lilies and Violets"
- "Bereft"
- "Sing Sweet, Little Bird"
- "Alone with the Dead"
- "What?"
- "So! Is it Death at Last?"
- "A Sweeping Wind, and a Blinding Rain"20
- "'Good-Night!'"
- "The Son"
- "Wedded"
- "Life"
- "Two Souls"
- "Ah, If We Only Could"
- "Grief"
- "My Heart is Full of Tears"
- "The Wail of the Baby"
- "Shivery, Shivery, Shaky, O!"
- "In Poverty and Toil sequence
- "Sing, Sing i' th' Morning!"
- "Ai! Ai!"
- "The Birthday"
- "He Sleeps!"
- "Down by the Sea"
- "O the Voice of Her, and the Face of Her!"
- "Time Goes On Swiftly"
- "Outcast"
- "I Shall Not Sleep"
- "When Simmer Thraws th' Siller Threid"
- "Ride on a Foot Song"
- "D' Children"
- "Her Lips Are Pale"
- "How Sweet to Hear!"
- "The Way t' Burnie"
- "Donald MacDonell"
- "My Bonnie Love"
- "My Little Maid"
- "And It's Whistle, Whistle, Whistle"
- ""Adios, Amigo!""
- "To My Son"
- "O Singer in Brown"
- "Cupid Came to Me To-Day"
- "The Spinner"
- "Haud Awa', ye Roguey!"
- "Thou Weepest!"
- "Why I am Happy"
- "The Green Green Hill"
- "De Babby (Baby)"
- "Goin' Home"
- "The Truest Mate"
- "I Had a Little Garden"
- "My Little Love is Sleeping"
- "Day Gives Her Radiant Face"
- "Dunrobin Hill"
- "Springbank"
- "Houpla! Houpla!"
- "I Dreamed That Thou Wert Dead"
- "Awakened"
- "Kiss Me, Sweet"
- "O, Little Honey-Sweet"
- "An' Aye the Bairnies Grat!"
- "Sweethearts"
- "Dead, O God!"
- "You A-Wantin' Me (Lovers)"
- "I Know Not"
- "The Child"
- "Broken of Heart"
- "Down in a Quiet Corner"
- "Draw Down the Blind"
- "My Hand in Thine"
- "Repaid"
- "Singin' Low"
- "Wearyin'"
- "The Bairnie Rins Aboot th' Hoose"
- "Close to My Heart"
- "I Hold Your Hand"
- "If I Should Make a Garden"
- "Sleep! Sleep! Sleep!"
- "'Taint F'r Us"
- "Once"
- "Lubin Comes Across the Way"
- "Suzanne"
- "Somehow We Missed Each Other"
- "Love! Art Thou Come Again?"
- "Buds"
- "I Ha'e a Drouth"
- "Thee-Ward!"
- "A Little Ghost"
- "By the Lone Thorn"
- "Her Prayer"
- "Us is Out "
- "Us Ain't Made to Snap 'n' Snarl"
- "A Song of Casterton"
- "The Fairy Man"

== Critical reception ==
A writer in the Daily Herald from Adelaide noted: "Much of Mary Gilmore's work consists of homely thoughts in homely language. Another portion is the utterance of a woman's heart, little crys of love and longing. There are poignant appeals for the afflicted, the oppressed, the victims of life's battles. The work is emotional rather than intellectual; and when a reader can share the emotion, as often, the message is clear and strong. The stanzas entitled 'Marri'd' are already cherished by thousands of humble witnesses to the true human affection that they so graphically depict."

In the Adelaide Advertiser the poetry reviewer commented: "Among the poets of the Commonwealth she is entitled to a place, as the present volume shows. Her lyre is always tuneful, and though her themes are familiar enough – sunset, twilight, the parting of lovers, the curlew's call, the flight of time, the sleeping baby – she infuses into the treatment of all feelings distinctively her own."

== Publication history ==
After the initial publication of the collection by George Robertson and Co. in 1910, it has not been reprinted.

== See also ==
- 1910 in Australian literature
