= Clementine Krämer =

German poet and writer

- Born: Clementine Sophie Cahnmann; 7 October 1873; Rheinbischofsheim, German Empire
- Died: 4 November 1942 (aged 69); Theresienstadt, Czechoslovakia
- Occupations: Writer, Social Activist
- Spouse: Max Krämer (m. 1891)

Clementine Sophie Krämer (née Cahnmann; 7 October 1873 – 4 November 1942) was a German Jewish writer of poetry, novellas and short stories. She was also an activist in the German Jewish community and was ultimately detained in Theresienstadt concentration camp, where she died.

== Biography ==
Krämer was born Clementine Sophie Cahnmann on 7 October 1873 in Rheinbischofsheim, a borough of Rheinau, Baden-Württemberg. Her parents were Gustav Cahnmann, a merchant, and Augusta Levi, and she had an older brother named Sigwart. When she was seven years old, the family moved to Karlsruhe.

She remained in Karlsruhe until 1891, when she married banker Max Krämer and they moved to Munich together.

In Munich, Krämer became involved in Jewish social work at the B'nai B'rith center in Munich, where she taught immigrant women in German and literature. She and a group of friends founded Israelitischen Jugendhilfe (Israelite Youth Aid), the first Jewish social work agency in Munich. Through that organization, she came to know the Jüdischer Frauenbund (Jewish Women's Association). She was one of the charter members of the association's Munich chapter as well as a member of its board of directors. In this role, she worked with women including Bertha Pappenheim.

A pacifist, she served as a representative of the Frauenbund in the Jüdischer Friedensbund (Jewish Peace League). She was also tangentially involved in the German women's suffrage movement through the Munich branch of the Deutscher Verein für Frauenstimmrecht (German Society for Women's Suffrage).

Krämer wrote extensively in the form of poetry, novellas and short stories, although little of her work was published. Her novella Die Rauferei was published in 1927 and others were published in newspapers, including Der Weg des jungen Hermann Kahn (1915), Erinnerungen (1920) and Der Grossvater und der Hofbauer (1915; reprinted in 1924), which were published serially. Her writings during World War I were "studiously devoid of Jewish issues and characters", as noted by Elizabeth Loentz, and were published in the mainstream press, while her postwar works were published only in the Jewish press.

Common themes in her writing include Jewish family life, the relationship between German Jews and Judaism, and World War I, as well as pacifism and feminism. She also wrote numerous children's stories, including Fritzschen in Traumland (1919), although she had no children herself; most of the children in her stories were based on her six nieces and nephews. She often wrote in Bavarian dialects.

During World War I, Krämer sought assistance from Jewish business owners in providing to families of dead soldiers. After the war, her husband's business went bankrupt and she began working at S. Eichengrün & Co., a Jewish textile shop, in 1929. After Adolf Hitler assumed power in Germany in 1933, she made numerous attempts to flee Nazi persecution.

Although a relative from the United States provided her with an affidavit of support, she was unable to leave Germany before World War II began and the American consulates in Germany were closed. She attempted to migrate to Denmark, China, and Cuba, all without success before being sent to Theresienstadt concentration camp in 1942. Already ill before her detainment, she died on 4 November 1942, shortly after arriving at Theresienstadt.

== Bibliography ==
- Lorentz, Elizabeth. The Literary Double Life of Clementine Krämer: German-Jewish Activist and Bavarian 'Heimat' and Dialect Writer [in: Nexus, Essays in German Jewish Studies, Vol.1: A Publication of Duke University Jewish Studies, pp 109–136]. Camden House, 2011. ISBN 1571135014
- Painter, Corinne (2019) Writing Lives: A Female German Jewish Perspective on the Early Twentieth Century, Peter Lang, ISBN 9781788741552
