= Backblock Ballads and Other Verses =

1913 poetry collection by C. J. Dennis

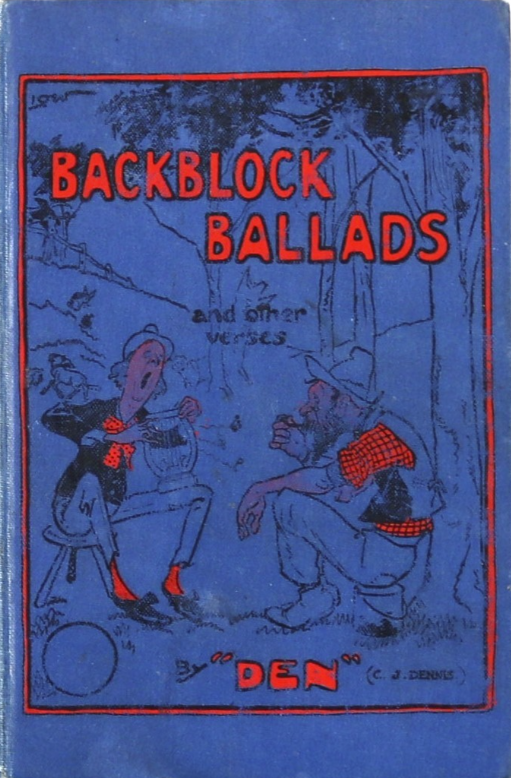
- Author: C. J. Dennis
- Language: English
- Genre: Poetry collection
- Publisher: E. W. Cole
- Publication date: 1913
- Publication place: Australia
- Media type: Print
- Pages: 199 pp
- Preceded by: -
- Followed by: The Songs of a Sentimental Bloke

Backblock Ballads and Other Verses is the first collection of poems by the Australian writer C. J. Dennis, published by E. W. Cole, Melbourne, in 1913. It includes his famous poems "Wheat" and "The Austra-laise", as well as the first book publication of several poems that would later appear in The Songs of a Sentimental Bloke.

The collection consists of 58 poems from a variety of sources. The bulk of the collection was later re-issued in 1918 under the title of Backblock Ballads and Later Verses.

The title is a homage to Rudyard Kipling's Barrack-Room Ballads and Other Verses.

Dennis included a "Glossary" of terms used in the poems at the end of the book, which he sub-titled "For the use of the thoroughly genteel".

== Contents ==
- "'Urry!"
- "Roamin' Free"
- "Langwidge"
- "Doch-an-Doris"
- "An Old Master"
- "Wanderers Lost"
- "The Looting of Jim"
- "Hopeful Hawkins"
- "Mutton"
- "The Homeward Track"
- "Cow"
- "Barley Grass"
- "Snakes"
- "Mornin' Magpies"
- "Up 'long the Billabong"
- "When the Sun's Behind the Hill"
- "Wheat"
- "The Cruise of the 'Nightmare'"
- "The Ballad of Juno Sue"
- "Me 'an Bates"
- "Cleanin'"
- "The Bleating of the Sheep"
- "Comin' Home frum Shearin'"
- "The Silent Member"
- "On the Land"
- "Toolangi"
- Other Verses
  - The Sentimental Bloke
  - I. "A Spring Song"
  - II. "The Intro"
  - III. "The Stoush o' Day"
  - IV. "Doreen"
- "Brothers o' Mine"
- "The Joy Ride"
- "The Tory"
- "The Austra-laise"
- "My Poor Relation"
- "The Martyred Democrat"
- "The Idolators"
- "The Lovers"
- "The Nearing Drums"
- "The Royal Hat"
- "Under the Party Plan"
- "Yarra Flats"
- "The First Elective Ministry"
- "It Was Never Contemplated"
- "Weighed In"
- "A Ballad of Elderly Kids"
- "Moonshine"
- "The Eternal Circle"
- "The Chase of Ages"
- "The Bridge Across the Crick"
- "Son of a Fool"
- "Suburbia - a Yearn"
- "The High Priest"
- "'Paw'"
- "Weary"
- "Brown's Tram"
- "The Bore"
- "Overweight"

== Critical reception ==
Writing about the collection in The Sunday Times from Sydney a reviewer stated: "In Australia we have had some very good light versifiers. C. J. Dennis is one of the best of these something between Gilbert and Goodge. His work is always readable, and in humorous vein he is always amusing. For the most part his humor is tinged with satire."

In the Melbourne Herald Archibald T. Strong commented: "These ballads, with a few exceptions, pretend to be nothing more than entertaining jingles. Considered as such, their merit is very uneven, but the best of them possess a most acceptable raciness and humor. By far the best part of the book is that written in that specific variety of impure English which may be termed pure Australian."

== Publication history ==
The collection was originally published in July 1913 by E. W. Cole, owner of Cole's Book Arcade in Bourke Street, Melbourne.

The collection contains poems that were originally published in The Bulletin, The Critic, The Gadfly, The Lone Hand, and Adelaide's Evening Journal newspaper.

== See also ==
- cjdennis.com.au
- 1913 in Australian literature
