= Joan Colebrook =

Australian American writer and journalist

Joan Colebrook (Heale) (1910–1991) was an Australian American writer and journalist.

== Life ==
Joan Moffat Heale was born on 31 August 1910 and grew up on a dairy farm in Queensland, Australia. She took a BA from the University of Queensland in 1932 and worked as a freelance journalist. She married Mulford Albert Colebrook in 1933 and moved to England before settling permanently in Cape Cod in the US in the late 1940s. She had two sons and a daughter.

== Works ==
Colebrook wrote several novels and non-fiction books. She wrote journalism for magazines including Commentary, The New Republic and The New Yorker. One of her best received works was The Cross of Latitude, based on her experience as a social-worker and women's prison officer.

=== Novels ===
- All That Seemed Final (1941)
- The Northerner (1948)

=== Nonfiction ===
- The Cross of Latitude (1968)
- Innocents of the West (1979)
- A House of Trees (1987).
