= For Australia and Other Poems =

1913 poetry collection by Henry Lawson

- Author: Henry Lawson
- Language: English
- Genre: Poetry collection
- Publisher: Standard Publishing
- Publication date: 1913
- Publication place: Australia
- Media type: Print
- Pages: 236 pp
- Preceded by: The Rising of the Court and Other Sketches in Prose and Verse
- Followed by: Triangles of Life and Other Stories

For Australia and Other Poems is a collection of poems by the Australian writer Henry Lawson, published by Standard Publishing, Melbourne, in 1913. It includes a version of his famous poem "Freedom on the Wallaby".

The collection consists of 62 poems from a variety of sources.

== Contents ==
- "For Australia"
- "The Day Before I Die"
- "The Spirits of Our Fathers"
- "For All the Land to See"
- "Our Mistress and Our Queen"
- "The Gathering of the Brown-Eyed"
- "Who'll Wear the Beaten Colours?"
- "Macleay Street and Red Rock Lane"
- "The Wantaritencant"
- "The Motor Car"
- "Freedom on the Wallaby"
- "Give Yourself a Show"
- "'39'"
- "That Great Waiting Silence"
- "Above Crow's Nest (Sydney)"
- "To Be Amused"
- "Australia's Peril : The Warning"
- "The Federal City"
- "'O7' (Cypher Seven)"
- "Every Man Should Have a Rifle"
- "What Have We All Forgotten?"
- "Since the Cities are the Cities"
- "To Victor Daley"
- "The Bards Who Lived at Manly"
- "The Empty Glass"
- "The Soul of a Poet"
- "Divorced"
- "And What Have You to Say?"
- "Till All the Bad Things Came Untrue"
- "In Possum Land"
- "The Spirits for Good"
- "To Jack"
- "In the Height of Fashion"
- "The Prime of Life"
- "My Father-in-Law and I"
- "Johnson's Wonder"
- "Bound for the Lord-Knows-Where"
- "The Rush to London"
- "A Word from the Bards"
- "The Stranded Ship"
- "The Cab Lamps : or, From the Lanes of 'Loo"
- "The Bard of Furthest Out"
- "To Show What a Man Can Do"
- "The Lily of St Leonards"
- "Before We Were Married"
- "My Wife's Second Husband"
- "The Peace Maker"
- "Keeping His First Wife Now"
- "Victor"
- "I'm an Older Man than You"
- "When Your Sins Come Home to Roost"
- "The Muscovy Duck"
- "For He Was a Jolly Good Fellow"
- "The Separated Woman"
- "The Bush Beyond the Range"
- "Hannah Thornburn"
- "A Dan Yell"
- "Bush Hay" "
- "When Hopes Ran High"
- "The Little Native Rose"
- "Take it Fightin'"
- "The Sorrows of a Simple Bard"

== Critical reception ==
A writer in The Register from Adelaide was not impressed with the collection and noted "Mr. Lawson is always spirited, and — with the exception presently to be noted — readable. Generally he is quite original, stamping his verse with his own strong personality...An unfortunate point always to be reckoned, with in Lawson's work is his intense interest in himself and his past sins and struggles. Kendall had the same trait, but in him it could be pardoned, because it produced true poetry. That is not so here."

== Publication history ==
After its original publication by Standard Publishing in 1913, the collection was republished as follows:

- Lothian Books, Melbourne, 1916
- Lothian Books, Melbourne, 1944

== See also ==
- 1913 in Australian literature
