= Vachel Lindsay =

American poet (1879–1931)

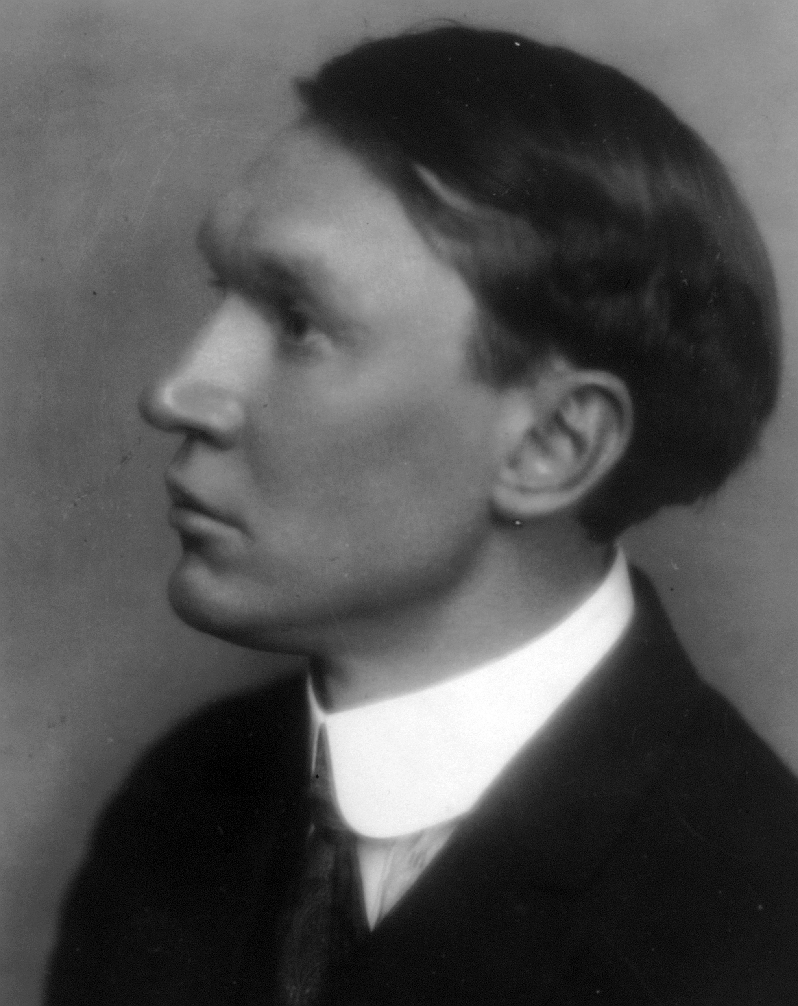
- Lindsay in 1913
- Born: November 10, 1879; Springfield, Illinois, United States
- Died: December 5, 1931 (aged 52); Springfield, Illinois, United States
- Occupation: Poet
- Spouse: Elizabeth Connor
- Children: Susan Doniphan Lindsay, Nicholas Cave Lindsay

Nicholas Vachel Lindsay (/ˈveɪtʃəl ˈlɪnzi/; November 10, 1879 – December 5, 1931) was an American poet. He is considered a founder of modern singing poetry, as he referred to it, in which verses are meant to be sung or chanted.

== Early years ==
Lindsay was born in Springfield, Illinois where his father, Vachel Thomas Lindsay, worked as a medical doctor and had amassed considerable wealth. The Lindsays lived across the street from the Illinois Executive Mansion, home of the Governor of Illinois. The location of his childhood home influenced Lindsay, and one of his poems, "The Eagle That Is Forgotten," eulogizes Illinois governor John P. Altgeld, whom Lindsay admired for his courage in pardoning the anarchists involved in the Haymarket Affair, despite the strong protests of US President Grover Cleveland.

Growing up in Springfield influenced Lindsay in other ways, as evidenced in such poems as "On the Building of Springfield," and culminating in poems praising Springfield's most famous resident, Abraham Lincoln. In "Lincoln", Lindsay exclaims, "Would I might rouse the Lincoln in you all!" This line was later adopted as the official motto of the Association of Lincoln Presenters. In his 1914 poem, "Abraham Lincoln Walks at Midnight (In Springfield, Illinois)", Lindsay specifically places Lincoln in Springfield, with the poem's opening:

It is portentous, and a thing of state
That here at midnight, in our little town
A mourning figure walks, and will not rest...

Lindsay studied medicine at Ohio's Hiram College from 1897 to 1900, but he did not want to be a doctor; his parents were pressuring him toward medicine. Once, he wrote to them that he wasn't meant to be a doctor, but a painter; they wrote back, and replied that doctors can draw pictures in their free time. He left Hiram anyway, heading to Chicago to study at the Art Institute of Chicago from 1900 to 1903. In 1904, he left to attend the New York School of Art (now The New School) to study pen and ink. Lindsay remained interested in art for the rest of his life, drawing illustrations for some of his poetry. His art studies also probably led him to appreciate the new art form of silent film. His 1915 book, The Art of the Moving Picture, is generally considered the first book of film criticism, according to critic Stanley Kauffmann, discussing Lindsay in For the Love of Movies: The Story of American Film Criticism.

== Beginnings as a poet ==
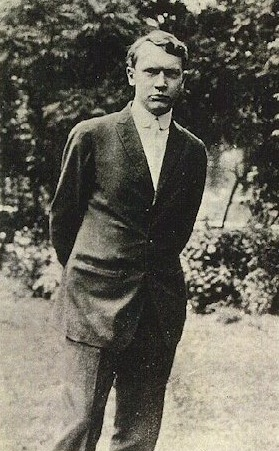
Vachel Lindsay in 1912.

While in New York in 1905, Lindsay turned to poetry in earnest. He tried to sell his poems on the streets. Self-printing his poems, he began to barter a pamphlet titled Rhymes To Be Traded For Bread, which he traded for food as a self-perceived modern version of a medieval troubadour.

From March to May of 1906, Lindsay traveled roughly 600 miles on foot from Jacksonville, Florida, to Kentucky, again trading his poetry for food and lodging. From April to May of 1908, Lindsay undertook another poetry-selling trek, walking from New York City to Hiram, Ohio.

From May to September of 1912 he traveled—again on foot—from Illinois to New Mexico, trading his poems for food and lodging. During this last trek, Lindsay composed his most famous poem, "The Congo". Going through Kansas, he was supposedly so successful that "he had to send money home to keep his pockets empty". On his return, Harriet Monroe published in Poetry magazine Lindsay’s poem, "General William Booth Enters into Heaven" in 1913, and then "The Congo" in 1914. At this point, Lindsay became very well known.

== Poetry as performance ==
Unlike Lindsay's more purely intellectual contemporaries, the poet declaimed his works from the stage, complete with the extravagant gestures of a carnival barker and old time preacher, from the beginning declaring himself to be a product of what he termed 'Higher Vaudeville': "I think that my first poetic impulse is for music; second a definite conception with the ring of the universe..." (Vachel Lindsay, Edgar Lee Masters 1935, p. 62) This is evidenced by the 1931 recording he made just before his suicide, which featured his still-radical performances of "The Mysterious Cat", "The Flower-Fed Buffaloes", and portions of "The Congo." He exhibited a fiery and furious, zany, at times incoherent delivery that appeared to have owed more to jazz than poetry, though the highly religious Lindsay was always reluctant to align himself thus.

Part of the success and great fame that Lindsay achieved—albeit briefly—was due to the singular manner in which he presented his poetry "fundamentally as a performance, as an aural and temporal experience...meant...to be chanted, whispered, belted out, sung, amplified by gesticulation and movement, and punctuated by shouts and whoops." [2]

Whirl ye the deadly voo-doo rattle,
Harry the uplands,
Steal all the cattle,
Rattle-rattle, rattle-rattle,
Bing.
Boomlay, boomlay, boomlay, Boom ...

The Congo

His best-known poem, "The Congo," exemplified his revolutionary aesthetic of sound for sound's sake. It imitates the pounding of the drums in the rhythms and in onomatopoeic nonsense words. At parts, the poem ceases to use conventional words when representing the chants of Congo's indigenous people, relying just on sound alone.

Lindsay's extensive correspondence with the poet W. B. Yeats details his intentions of reviving the musical qualities of poetry as they were practiced by the ancient Greeks. Because of his identity as a performance artist and his use of American midwestern themes, Lindsay became known in the 1910s as the "Prairie Troubador."

In the final twenty years of his life, Lindsay was one of the best known poets in the U.S. His reputation enabled him to befriend, encourage, and mentor other poets, such as Langston Hughes and Sara Teasdale. His poetry, though, lacked elements which encouraged the attention of academic scholarship, and, after his death, he became an obscure figure.

== Attitudes towards race ==
Most contemporaries acknowledged Lindsay's intention to be an advocate for African-Americans. This intention was particularly evident in the 1918 poem "The Jazz Birds," praising the war efforts of African-Americans during World War I, an issue to which the vast majority of the white US seemed blind. Additionally, W.E.B. Du Bois hailed Lindsay's story, "The Golden-Faced People," for its insights into racism. Lindsay saw himself as anti-racist not only in his own writing, but also in his encouragement of Langston Hughes, a writer Lindsay credited himself with discovering. Hughes worked as a busboy at a Washington, D.C. restaurant where Lindsay ate, and had given Lindsay copies of his poems.

However, many contemporaries and later critics have contended over whether a couple of Lindsay's poems should be seen as homages to African and African-American music, as perpetuation of the "savage African" stereotype, or as both. DuBois, before reading and praising "The Golden-Faced People," wrote in a review of Lindsay's "Booker T. Washington Trilogy" that "Lindsay knows two things, and two things only, about Negroes: The beautiful rhythm of their music and the ugly side of their drunkards and outcasts. From this poverty of material he tries now and then to make a contribution to Negro literature. ... It goes without saying that he only partially succeeds." Added DuBois: "Mr. Lindsay knows little of the Negro, and that little is dangerous." DuBois also criticized "The Congo," which has been the most persistent focus of the criticisms of racial stereotyping in Lindsay's work.

Subtitled "A Study of the Negro Race," and beginning with a section titled "Their Basic Savagery", "The Congo" reflects the tensions within a relatively isolated and pastoral society suddenly confronted by the industrialized world. The poem was inspired by a sermon preached in October 1913 that detailed the drowning of a missionary in the Congo River; this event had drawn worldwide criticism, as had the colonial exploitation of the Congo under the government of Leopold II of Belgium. Lindsay defended the poem; in a letter to Joel Spingarn, chairman of the board of directors of the NAACP, Lindsay wrote: "My 'Congo' and 'Booker T. Washington Trilogy' have both been denounced by the Colored people for reasons that I cannot fathom.... The third section of 'The Congo' is certainly as hopeful as any human being dare to be in regard to any race." Spingarn responded by acknowledging Lindsay's good intentions, but rebuffed that Lindsay sometimes glamorized differences between people of African descent and people of other races, while many African-Americans wished to emphasize the "feelings and desires" that they held in common with others.

Similarly, critics in academia often portray Lindsay as a well-meaning but misguided primitivist in his representations of Africans and African Americans. One such critic, Rachel DuPlessis, argued that the poem, while perhaps meant to be "hopeful," actually "others" Africans as an inherently violent race. In the poem and Lindsay's defenses of it, DuPlessis hears Lindsay warning white readers not to be "hoo-doo'd," or seduced, by violent African "mumbo jumbo." This warning seems to suggest that white civilization has been "infected" by African violence; Lindsay thus, in effect, "blames blacks for white violence directed against them." Conversely, Susan Gubar notes approvingly that "the poem contains lines blaming black violence on white imperialism." While acknowledging that the poem seems to have given its author and audiences an excuse to indulge in "'romantic racism' or 'slumming in slang,'" she also observes that Lindsay was "much more liberal than many of his poetic contemporaries," and that he seems to have intended a statement against the kind of racist violence perpetrated under Leopold in the Congo.

== Later years ==
=== Fame ===
Lindsay's fame as a poet grew in the 1910s. Because Harriet Monroe showcased him with two other Illinois poets—Carl Sandburg and Edgar Lee Masters—his name became linked to theirs. The success of either of the other two, in turn, seemed to help the third.

In 1932, Edgar Lee Masters published an article on modern poetry in The American Mercury that praised Lindsay extensively, and wrote a biography of Lindsay in 1935 (four years after its subject's death) titled Vachel Lindsay: A Poet in America.

In the 1915 preface to "The Congo," Lindsay indicated that no less a figure than William Butler Yeats respected his work. Yeats felt they shared a concern for capturing the sound of the primitive and of singing in poetry. In 1915, Lindsay gave a poetry reading to President Woodrow Wilson and the entire Cabinet.

=== Marriage, children, and financial troubles ===
Lindsay's private life was rife with disappointments, such as his unsuccessful courtship in 1914 of fellow poet Sara Teasdale before she married rich businessman Ernst Filsinger. While this event may have caused Lindsay to become more concerned with money, his financial pressures would greatly increase later on.

In 1924, he moved to Spokane, Washington, where he lived in room 1129 of the Davenport Hotel until 1929. On May 19, 1925, at age 45, he married 23-year-old Elizabeth Connor. The new pressure to support his considerably younger wife escalated when they had children. In May 1926, the couple’s daughter, Susan Doniphan Lindsay, was born. (Susan would later go on to marry and divorce John Conrad Russell, who became the 4th Earl Russell upon the 1970 death of his father, the Nobel Laureate philosopher and peace activist Bertrand Russell.) In September 1927, their son, Nicholas Cave Lindsay, was born.

Desperate for money, Lindsay undertook an exhausting string of readings throughout the East and Midwest from October 1928 through March 1929. During this time, Poetry magazine awarded him a lifetime achievement award of $500 (equivalent to about $9375 when adjusted for inflation). In April 1929, Lindsay and his family moved to the house of his birth in Springfield, Illinois, an expensive undertaking. In that same year, coinciding with the Stock Market Crash of 1929, Lindsay published two more poetry volumes: The Litany of Washington Street and Every Soul A Circus. He gained money by doing odd jobs throughout, but in general earned very little during his travels.

=== Suicide ===
Crushed by financial worry and in failing health from his six-month road trip, Lindsay sank into depression. On December 5, 1931, he committed suicide by drinking a bottle of lye, although published reports at the time attributed his death to a heart attack. His last words were: "They tried to get me; I got them first!"

== Legacy ==
=== Literary ===
Lindsay, a versatile and prolific writer and poet, helped to "keep alive the appreciation of poetry as a spoken art," whose poetry was said to "abound in meter and rhymes and is no shredded prose," had a traditional verse structure and was described by a contemporary in 1924 as "pungent phrases, clinging cadences, dramatic energy, comic thrust, lyric seriousness and tragic intensity." Lindsay's biographer, Dennis Camp, said that Lindsay's ideas on "civic beauty and civic tolerance" were published in 1912 in his broadside, "The Gospel of Beauty," and that later, in 1915, Lindsay published the first American study of film as an art form, The Art of The Moving Picture. Camp notes that on Lindsay's tombstone is recorded a single word: "Poet."

=== Vachel Lindsay House ===
The Illinois Historic Preservation Agency helps to maintain the Vachel Lindsay House at 603 South Fifth Street in Springfield, the site of Lindsay's birth and death. The agency donated the house to the state, which then closed it for restoration at a cost of $1.5 million. As of October 8, 2014, the site was again open to the public, with guided tours available on Thursday to Sunday from 1 to 5 pm. Lindsay's grave lies in Oak Ridge Cemetery. The bridge crossing the midpoint of Lake Springfield, built in 1934, is named in Lindsay's honor.

=== Archives ===
The Vachel Lindsay Archive resides at the Albert and Shirley Small Special Collections Library at the University of Virginia. It comprises his personal papers, manuscripts of his works, correspondence, photographs, artworks, printing blocks, books from his personal library, and a comprehensive collection of books by and about Lindsay. The Archives and Special Collections at Amherst College holds a small collection of manuscripts and other items sent by Lindsay to Eugenia Graham.

== Selected works ==
- The Daniel Jazz and Other Poems (1920)
- Abraham Lincoln Walks at Midnight
- An Indian Summer Day on the Prairie
- A Rhyme About an Electrical Advertising Sign
- A Sense of Humor
- Bryan, Bryan, Bryan, Bryan
- The Dandelion
- Drying Their Wings
- Euclid
- Factory Windows are Always Broken
- The Flower-Fed Buffaloes
- General William Booth Enters Into Heaven – the American composer Charles Ives wrote music to this poem (with minor text alterations) shortly after its publication
- In Praise of Johnny Appleseed
- The Kallyope Yell – see Calliope for additional information
- The Leaden-Eyed
- Love and Law
- The Mouse That Gnawed the Oak Tree Down
- The North Star Whispers to the Blacksmith's Son
- On the Garden Wall
- The Prairie Battlements
- The Golden Book of Springfield
- Prologue to 'Rhymes to be Traded for Bread'
- The Congo: A Study of the Negro Race
- The Eagle That is Forgotten
- The Firemen's Ball
- The Rose of Midnight
- This Section is a Christmas Tree
- To Gloriana
- What Semiramis Said
- What the Ghost of the Gambler Said
- Why I Voted the Socialist Ticket
- Written for a Musician

== Other ==
- The poem The Congo is quoted in the 1989 American film Dead Poets Society.
