= Roo Borson =

Canadian poet

Ruth "Roo" Elizabeth Borson (born January 20, 1952, in Berkeley, California) is a Canadian poet who lives in Toronto. After undergraduate studies at UC Santa Barbara and Goddard College, she received an MFA from the University of British Columbia.

She has received many awards for her work, including the Governor General's Literary Award, 2004, and the Griffin Poetry Prize, 2005 for Short Journey Upriver Toward Oishida. She currently lives in Toronto with poet Kim Maltman, and with Kim Maltman and Andy Patton is a member of the collaborative performance poetry ensemble Pain Not Bread.

== Works ==
- Landfall (1977), ISBN 0-920110-32-0
- Rain (1980), ISBN 0-920806-19-8
- In the Smoky Light of the Fields (1980), ISBN 0-88823-024-9
- A Sad Device (1981), ISBN 0-86495-011-X
- The Whole Night, Coming Home (1984), ISBN 0-7710-1579-8 (nominated for a Governor General's Award)
- The Transparence of November / Snow (1985), ISBN 0-919627-30-7 (with Kim Maltman)
- Intent, or, The Weight of the World (1989), ISBN 0-7710-1588-7
- Night Walk (1994), ISBN 0-19-541082-3 (nominated for a Governor General's Award)
- Water Memory (1996), ISBN 0-7710-1589-5
- Introduction to the Introduction to Wang Wei (2000), ISBN 1-894078-09-8 (by Pain Not Bread)
- Short Journey Upriver Toward Oishida (2004), ISBN 0-7710-1591-7 (winner of the 2004 Governor General's Award, the 2005 Canadian Griffin Poetry Prize and the 2005 Pat Lowther Award)
- Personal History (2008) ISBN 1-897141-21-1
- Rain; road; an open boat (2012), ISBN 0-7710-1298-5
- Box Kite: Prose Poems by Baziju (2016), ISBN 9781770899629 (with Kim Maltman)
- Cardinal in the Eastern White Cedar (2017), ISBN 978-0771012242
