= Gilbert E. Brooke =

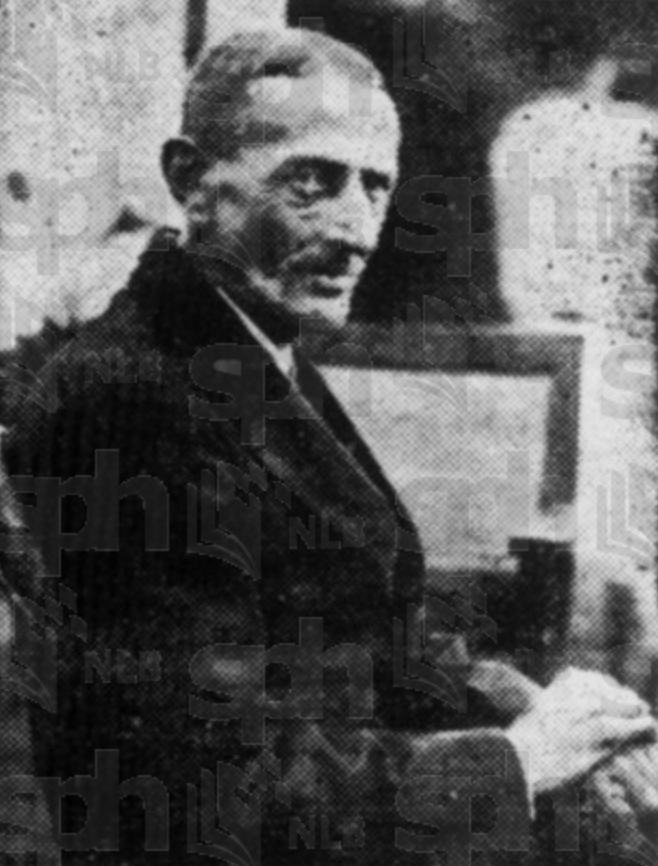
Gilbert E. Brooke

Gilbert Edward Brooke (28 March 1873 — 15 January 1936) was the Chief Health Officer of Singapore and a poet.

== Early life and education ==
Brooke was born in Hyères, France on 28 March 1873. From 1884 to 1888, he was a pupil at Monkton Combe School in Somerset, England. From 1889 to 1890, he attended a boarding school in Ouchy, Switzerland. He later studied at Pembroke College in Cambridge, where he obtained his B.A. in 1894 and his M.A. in 1901.

== Career ==
In September 1897, Brooke was made a Government Medical Officer in the Turks and Caicos Islands. He was made a J.P. of the Turks Islands, a District Commissioner of the Caicos Islands, a police magistrate and a coroner two years later. In 1990, he was made a Receiver of Wreck for the Caicos Islands and a Marriage Officer. He then returned to England in the following year to further his studies. In January 1902, he arrived in Singapore and was made the Port Health Officer. In 1905, he became a lecturer in Hygiene at the Singapore Medical School. In 1906, he was made a Deputy Coroner and in 1908, he became a J.P. of Singapore. He published the tropical medicine textbooks Aids to Tropical Medicine and Essentials of Sanitary Science in 1908 and 1909 respectively.

From 1911 to 1912, Brooke served as Acting Government Veterinary Surgeon. In January 1914, he was appointed the Chief Health Officer of Singapore. During the 1915 Singapore Mutiny, he served as the Transport Officer to the Singapore Garrison. In March 1918, he was appointed a member of the Singapore Centenary Committee. In November of the same year, he was appointed a member of the Committee on Sanitary Education. From 23 August 1920 to January 1921, he served as the Acting Chief Medical Officer, after which he resumed duties as Chief Health Officer. In 1921, he served on the Ground Committee of the Malaya-Borneo Exhibition. He was appointed the director of the League of Nations Eastern Bureau on 1 March 1925. He resigned from the role on 19 November 1926. From 1926 to 1927, he served as a convenor of the Baby Shows for the Singapore Child Welfare Society. On 9 May 1927, he was made a member of the Standing Medical Advisory Committee for Malaya. He retired from government service in March of the following year and left for Sarawak. He then became a Health Officer to the Government of Sarawak.

Brooke was also a poet. By 1922, his poems had been published in The Royal Standard and Gazette of the Turks and Caicos, The Singapore Free Press, The Sydney Daily Telegraph, the Bath Chronicle, The Straits Times and the Malayan Review. A collection of his poems, titled Oddments, was published in 1922. He served as the editor of the Malaya Medical Journal. He was also a co-editor of One Hundred Years of Singapore, which was commissioned by the Centenary Committee and published in two volumes in 1921. He wrote the book's chapters on "Piracy", "The Science of Singapore" and the "Botanical Garden".

== Personal life and death ==
Brooke married Alice Marie Swabey at the St Thomas à Becket Church in Bath on 6 October 1897. They had two sons and three daughters, one of whom married N. A. M. Griffin, the Chief Police Officer of Singapore.

He retired to Penang in 1933. He died in Singapore on 15 January 1936.
