= 1966 in poetry =

Nationality words link to articles with information on the nation's poetry or literature (for instance, Irish or France).

== Events ==
- Raymond Souster founds the League of Canadian Poets
- Philip Hobsbaum, who had founded The Belfast Group in Belfast, Northern Ireland, in 1963, departs for Glasgow, and the Belfast Group meetings lapsed for a while, but then was reconstituted in 1968 by Michael Allen, Arthur Terry, and Seamus Heaney. At one time or another, the grouping also includes Michael Longley, James Simmons, Paul Muldoon, Ciaran Carson, Stewart Parker, Bernard MacLaverty and the critic Edna Longley. Meetings will be held at Seamus and Marie Heaney's house on Ashley Avenue. The Belfast Group will last until 1972.
- Russian poet Joseph Brodsky returns to Leningrad from the exile near the Arctic Circle where he had been sent when a Soviet court in 1964 convicted him of "parasitism".
- Starting this year and continuing for a decade, Bulgarian censors prevent publication of works by Konstantin Pavlov, poet and screenwriter who was defiant against his country's communist regime; his popularity didn't wane, as Bulgarians clandestinely copied and read his poems.
- Ted Hughes and Daniel Weissbort found Modern Poetry in Translation (MPT), a British journal focusing on the art of translating poetry. Later defunct, the magazine was relaunched in 2004 under editors David and Helen Constantine.
- The journal L'éphémère founded in France; poets associated with it include Yves Bonnefoy, Jacques Dupin and André du Bouchet; it ceased publication in 1973

== Works published in English ==
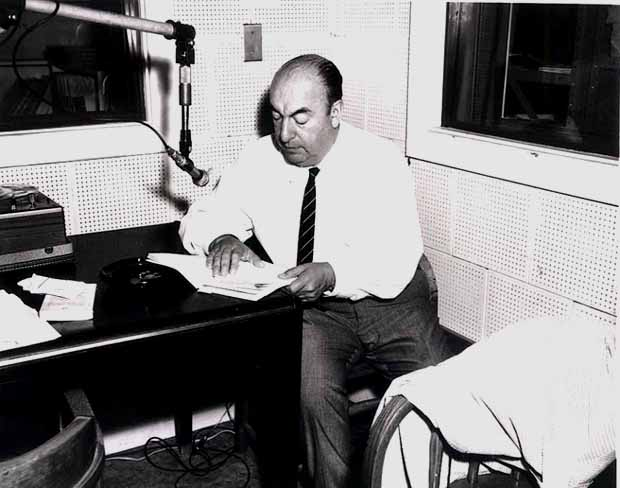
Chilean poet Pablo Neruda recording poems at the U.S. Library of Congress this year

Listed by nation where the work was first published (and again by the poet's native land, if different); substantially revised works listed separately:

=== Australia ===
- Vincent Buckley, Arcady and Other Places : Poems
- William Hart-Smith, The Talking Clothes: Poems
- A. D. Hope, Collected Poems 1930 - 1965
- Oodgeroo Noonuccal, The Dawn is at Hand
- Judith Wright, The Other Half : Poems

=== Canada ===
- Margaret Avison, The Dumbfounding
- Earle Birney, Selected Poems
- Arthur Bourinot, Watcher of Men: selected poems (1947–66)
- George Bowering, The Silver Wire
- Leonard Cohen, The Parasites of Heaven
- John Robert Colombo, Miraculous Montages
- Robert Finch, Silverthorn Bush and Other Poems.
- Lakshni Gill, During Rain I Plant Chrysanthemums
- Ralph Gustafson, Sift in an Hourglass
- George Johnston, Home Free
- Gwendolyn MacEwen, A Breakfast for Barbarians
- Richard Outram, Exultante Jubilee
- Joe Rosenblatt, The LSD Leacock. Toronto: Coach House Press.
- F. R. Scott, Selected Poems. Toronto: Oxford University Press.
- A. J. M. Smith, and F. R. Scott, editors, The Oxford Book of Canadian Verse, second edition (see also, first edition 1958)
- Raymond Souster, ed. New Wave Canada, anthology of seven young writers
- Miriam Waddington, The Glass Trumpet

=== India, in English ===
- Nissim Ezekiel, Collected Poems ( Poetry in English ),
- Arvind Krishna Mehrotra, Bharatmata: A Prayer ( Poetry in English ), an experimental work published by the author's own publishing house; Bombay: Ezra-Fakir Press
- Dom Moraes, Beldam & Others ( Poetry in English )
- Gieve Patel, Poems ( Poetry in English ), Mumbai: Nissim Ezekiel .
- G. S. Sharat Chandra, Bharata Natyam Dancer and Other Poems ( Poetry in English ), Calcutta: Writers Workshop, India .
- Leela Dharmaraj, Slum Silhouette and Other Poems ( Poetry in English ), Calcutta: Writers Workshop, India .
- R. P. N. Sinha, editor, A Book of English Verse on Indian Soil, New Delhi: Orient Longmans

=== Ireland ===
- Austin Clarke, Mnemosyne Lay in Dust, Dublin: Dolmen Press
- Seamus Heaney, Death of a Naturalist, Faber & Faber, Northern Ireland poet published in the United Kingdom
- Thomas Kinsella, Wormwood, Dublin: Dolmen Press; book widely available in the United Kingdom
- Louis MacNeice, The Collected Poems of Louis MacNeice, edited by E. R. Dodds, including "Mayfly", "Snow", "Autumn Journal XVI", "Meeting Point", "Autobiography", "the Libertine", "Western Landscape", "Autumn Sequel XX", "The Once-in-Passing", "House on a Cliff", "Soap Suds", "The Suicide" and "Star-gazer", Faber and Faber, Irish poet published in the United Kingdom,
- John Montague, All Legendary Obstacles, Dublin: Dolmen Press

=== United Kingdom ===
- W. H. Auden, English poet published in the United States:
  - About the House, first published in the United States, 1965
  - Collected Shorter Poems 1927–57
- Karen Gershon, Selected Poems
- Gavin Bantock, Christ
- George Barker, Dreams of a Summer Night
- John Betjeman, High and Low
- Basil Bunting, Briggflatts
- Angela Carter, Unicorn
- Lawrence Durrell, The Ikons, and Other Poems
- Tom Earley, A Welshman in Bloomsbury
- Gavin Ewart, Pleasures of the Flesh
- Elaine Feinstein, In a Green Eye, Goliard Press
- Robert Graves, Collected Poems
- J. C. Hall, The Burning Hare
- Seamus Heaney, Death of a Naturalist, Faber & Faber, Northern Ireland poet published in the United Kingdom
- Philip Hobsbaum, In Retreat
- Christopher Isherwood, Exhumations, stories, articles and poetry; an English writer living in and published in the United States
- Elizabeth Jennings, The Mind Has Mountains
- Thomas Kinsella, Wormwood, Irish poet published in the United Kingdom
- Philip Larkin, The North Ship
- Richard Logue, Logue's ABC
- Norman MacCaig, Surroundings
- Louis MacNeice, The Collected Poems of Louis MacNeice, edited by E. R. Dodds, including "Mayfly", "Snow", "Autumn Journal XVI", "Meeting Point", "Autobiography", "the Libertine", "Western Landscape", "Autumn Sequel XX", "The Once-in-Passing", "House on a Cliff", "Soap Suds", "The Suicide" and "Star-gazer", Faber and Faber, Irish poet published in the United Kingdom,
- Ruth Pitter, Still by Choice
- Sir Herbert Read, Collected Poems, Horizon Press
- Peter Redgrove, The Force and Other Poems, London: Routledge and Kegan Paul
- Jon Silkin, New and Selected Poems
- Stevie Smith, The Frog Prince, and Other Poems
- Gillian Smyth, The Nitrogen Dreams of a Wide Girl
- Gary Snyder, A Range of Poems, London: Fulcrum Press, American
- R.S. Thomas, Pietà, Welsh
- Anthony Thwaite and John Hollander publish the first anthology of double dactyls, Jiggery Pokery
- Charles Tomlinson, American Scenes, and Other Poems, London: Macmillan
- David Wevill, A Christ of the Ice Floes

=== United States ===
- A.R. Ammons, Northfield Poems
- John Ashbery, Rivers and Mountains
- Ted Berrigan, Some Things
- Paul Blackburn,
  - 16 Sloppy Haiku and a Lyric for Robert Reardon
  - Sing Song
  - translator, Poem of the Cid
- Gwendolyn Brooks, We Real Cool
- Robert Creeley, Poems 1950-1965
- Robert Duncan, The Years as Catches
- Randall Jarrell (died 1965), The Lost World (published posthumously)
- Josephine Jacobsen, The Animal Inside
- LeRoi Jones, Black Art
- Stanley Kunitz, The Testing Tree
- James Merrill, Nights and Days
- W. S. Merwin, Collected Poems, New York: Atheneum
- Sylvia Plath, Ariel, New York: Harper & Row (London: Faber and Faber 1965) American poet in the United Kingdom
- A. K. Ramanujan, The Striders (Indian poet living in the United States)
- Kenneth Rexroth, Collected Shorter Poems
- Adrienne Rich, Necessities of Life, W. W. Norton & Company
- Theodore Roethke, Roethke: Collected Poems
- Anne Sexton, Live or Die
- Louis Simpson, Selected Poems (West Indian poet living in the United States)
- Gary Snyder, A Range of Poems, London: Fulcrum Press
- William Stafford, The Rescued Year
- Robert Penn Warren, Selected Poems, New and Old: 1923-1966
- Louis Zukofsky, All: the collected short poems 1956–1964, W. W. Norton & Company

==== Criticism, scholarship, biography ====
- Wallace Stevens, Letters of Wallace Stevens (posthumous), edited by Holly Stevens (his daughter)

=== Other in English ===
- James K. Baxter, Pig Island Letters (New Zealand)
- Louise Bennett, Jamaica Labrish, Jamaica
- John Pepper Clark, A Reed in the Tide (Nigeria)
- Keith Harrison, Points in a Journey (Australia)

== Works published in other languages ==
Listed by language and often by nation where the work was first published and again by the poet's native land, if different; substantially revised works listed separately:

=== Denmark ===
- Benny Anderson (poet), Portrætgalleri
- Thorkild Bjørnvig, Vibrationer
- Poul Borum, Dagslys
- Jørgen Gustava Brandt, Der er æg i mit skæg (prose sketches and poetry)
- Knud Holst, Samexistens
- Henrik Nordbrandt, Digte ("Poems")
- Bundgård Povlsen, Døgndrift

=== Finland ===
- Paavo Haavikko, Puut, kaikki heidän vihreytensä, ("The Trees, All Their Greenness")
- Eeva-Liisa Manner, Kirjoitettu kivi ("The Inscribed Stone"), poems and translations from contemporary Spanish poets
- Pentti Saarikoski, Ääneen ("Out Loud")

=== French language ===
==== Canada, in French ====
- Roger Brien:
  - Prométhée
  - Le Jour se lève
- Roland Giguère, L'Age de la parole
- Marie Laberge, D'un Cri à l'autre
- Rina Lasnier, L'Arbre blanc
- Suzanne Paradis, Le Visage offensé
- Jean Royer, À patience d'aimer, Québec: Éditions-de-l'Aile
- Gemma Tremblay, Cratères sous la niege

==== France ====
- Louis Aragon:
  - Elégie a Pablo Neruda
  - Les Poetes
- L. Brauquier, a book of poetry
- P. Chabaneix, a book of poetry
- René Char:
  - Recherche de la base et du sommet, Retour amont ("The Return Upland" or "The Return Upstream")
  - Retour Amont
- Michel Déguy:
  - Actes
  - Ouï-dire
- Pierre Emmanuel, Ligne de faîte
- Andre Frenaud, Les Rois Mages, revised edition (first edition, 1943)
- Pierre Emmanuel, pen name of Noël Mathieu, Ligne de faîte
- Gérard Genette, Figures I, one of three volumes of a work of critical scholarship in poetics – general theory of literary form and analysis of individual works — the Figures volumes are concerned with the problems of poetic discourse and narrative in Stendhal, Flaubert and Proust and in Baroque poetry (see also Figures II 1969, Figures III 1972)
- Eugène Guillevic, Avec
- Robert Marteau, Travaux sur la terre
- A. Miatlev, Thanathème
- Eugenio Montale, Ossi di seppia, Le ocassioni, and La bufera e altro, translated by Patrice Angelini into French from the original Italian; Paris: Gallimard
- Jean-Claude Renard, La Terre du sacré, received the 1966 Prix Sainte-Beuve
- A. Richaud, Je ne suis pas mort
- P. Seghers, Dialogue
- J. Tortel, Les Villes ouvertes
- Dominique Tron, Stéréophonies
- Boris Vian, a book of poetry

==== Belgium ====
- R. Goffin, a book of poetry in the publishing series "Poètes d'Aujourd'hui", French language, published in Belgium

=== Germany ===
==== West Germany ====
- Günter Eich, Anlässe und Steingärten
- Beda Allemann, editor, Ars poetica: Texte von Dichtern des 20. Jahrhunderts zur Poetik, 51 essays, Wissenschaftliche Buchgesellschaft, (criticism)
- Walter Naumann, Traum und Tradition in der deutschen Lyrik, Stuttgart: Kohlhammer Verlag (criticism)

===== Translations =====
- Oswald de Andrade (Brazil), translations of his:
  - Livro de Ensaios
  - Gálaxias

==== East Germany ====
- Wolf Biermann, Die Drahtharfe
- Volker Braun, Vorläufiges

=== Hebrew ===
==== Israel ====
- Reuven Ben-Yosef, Shehafim Mamtinim ("Waiting Gulls") American-born poet
- David Fogel, collected poems, with an introduction by D. Pagis
- S. Halkin, Maavar Yabok ("Crossing Jabbok")
- C. Schirmann, a book of poetry: a compilation of new poems from the Genizah
- Shin Shalom, a book of his complete works
- N. Zach, Kol ha-Halav veha-Devash ("All the Milk and Honey")

=== India ===
Listed in alphabetical order by first name:

- Geeta Parikh, Purvi; Gujarati-language
- Hari Daryani, Mauj Kai Mehran, Sindhi-language
- Udaya Narayana Singh, Kavayo Vadanti, Calcutta: Mithila Darshan; Maithili-language

=== Italy ===
- Alfonso Gatto, La storia delle vittime (winner of the Premio Viareggio prize)
- Dacia Maraini, Crudeltà all'aria aperta
- Eugenio Montale, Xenia, poems in memory of Mosca, first published in a private edition of 50; Italy
- Antonio Porta, I rapporti
- Giovanni Raboni, Le case della Vetra
- Sergio Salvi, Le croci di Cartesio
- Roberto Sanesi, Rapporto informativo
- Maria Luisa Spaziani, Utilità della memoria

=== Norway ===
- Georg Johannesen, Nye dikt
- Sigmund Skard, Haustraun
- Einar Skjæraasen, Bumerke (posthumous)
- Ragnvald Skrede, Grunnmalm
- Stein Mehren, Tids Alder
- Jan Erik Vold, Hekt

=== Portuguese language ===
==== Brazil ====
- Oswald de Andrade, Complete Works, a new edition (posthumous)
- Manuel Bandiera, Estrêla da Vida Inteira, an anthology of his poems, commemorating his 80th birthday
- João Cabral de Melo Neto, A Educação pela Pedra
- Mário Faustino, Poesía
- Ferreira Gullar, Luta Corporal e Outros Poemas
- Mário da Silva Brito, Poemário da Silva Brito

==== Portugal ====
- Ruy de Moura Belo, Boca bilíngüe ("Multiple Meanings")

=== Russia ===
- Pavel Antokolski, two volumes of poems to celebrate his 70th birthday
- David Kugoltinov, a book of poems translated from Kalmuk published in the "Soviet Poetry Library" series
- Robert Rozhdestvenski, The Radius of Action, including "Letter to the Thirtieth Century"

=== Spanish language ===
==== Mexico ====
- José López Bermùdez, Canto a Morelos (Mexico)
- Rubén Bonifaz Nuño, Siete de espadas (Mexico)
- Octavio Paz, "Vrindaban" and "Madurai" two poems on a Hindu theme by the Mexican ambassador to India
- José Emilio Pacheco, El reposo del fuego (Mexico)
- Ramón López Velarde, Suave Patria (Mexico)

==== Spain ====
- Jaime Gil de Biedma:
  - En favor de Venus, a collection
  - Moralidades, a larger collection published in Mexico
- Carlos Barral, Figuración y fuga
- Alfonso Canales, Aminadab
- Gloria Fuertes, Ni tiro, veneno, ni navaja
- Justo Jorge Padrón, Escrito en el agua
- Dionisio Ridruejo, Cuaderno Catalán
- Joaquín Caro Romero, El tiempo en el espejo

==== Other in Spanish ====
- José Santos Chocano, Antología, pról. y notas de Julio Ortega, Lima: Editorial Universitaria, Peru

=== Yiddish ===
- Israel Emiot, a collection of poems
- Jacob Glatstein, A Jew from Lublin
- Gabriel Preil, a collection of poems
- Chava Rosenfarb, a collection of poems
- Meyer Stiker, a collection of poems
- Moisei Teif, a collection of poems
- Leyb Vaserman, a collection of poems

=== Other languages ===
- Betti Alver, Tähetund ("Starry Hour"), Estonia
- Nizar Qabbani, Drawing with Words, Syrian poet writing in Arabic
- Giorgos Seferis, Τρία Κρυφά Ποιήματα ("Three Hidden Poems"), Greece
- Wisława Szymborska, 101 wierszy ("101 Poems"), Poland

== Awards and honors ==
- Nobel Prize for Literature: Nelly Sachs, a German poet, writing in German but living in Sweden and a Swedish subject, shared the prize with novelist and short story writer Shmuel Yosef Agnon of Israel.

=== Awards in Australia ===
- Grace Leven Prize for Poetry: William Hart-Smith, The Talking Clothes: Poems

=== Awards in Canada ===
- See 1966 Governor General's Awards for a complete list of winners and finalists for those awards.

=== Awards in France ===
- Prix des Critiques: René Char, for his work as a whole
- Grand Prix de Poésie de l'Académie Française: Pierre Jean Jouve

=== Awards in the United Kingdom ===
- Cholmondeley Award: Ted Walker, Stevie Smith
- Eric Gregory Award: Robin Fulton, Seamus Heaney, Hugo Williams

=== Awards in the United States ===
- Consultant in Poetry to the Library of Congress (later the post would be called "Poet Laureate Consultant in Poetry to the Library of Congress"): James Dickey appointed this year.
- National Book Award for Poetry: James Dickey, Buckdancer's Choice
- Pulitzer Prize for Poetry: Richard Eberhart, Selected Poems
- Fellowship of the Academy of American Poets: Archibald MacLeish and John Berryman

=== Awards in Spain ===
- Premio de la Crítica (a nonmonetary award by a jury of journalist-critics): Claudio Rodriguez, Alianza y condena
- Premio Adonais for verse: Vincente García Hernández, Los pájaros

=== Other ===
- Nordic Council's literature prize: Gunnar Ekelöf, Diwan över fursten av Engion (Sweden)

== Births ==
- April 8 – Todd Swift, Canadian-born British poet
- April 26 – Natasha Trethewey, American Poet Laureate
- May 28 – Roddy Lumsden (died 2020), Scottish poet
- June 12 – Michael Redhill, American-born Canadian poet
- July 21 – Tsering Woeser (also written: Öser; Tibetan: ཚེ་རིང་འོད་ཟེར་; Wylie: tshe-ring 'od-zer; simplified Chinese: 唯色; pinyin: Wéisè), Tibetan poet and essayist
- August 10 – Christian Bök, Canadian experimental poet
- August 31
  - Alice Oswald, English poet
  - Christian Wiman, American poet
- September 4 – Yanka Dyagileva (drowned 1991), Russian punk singer-songwriter and poet
- October 7 – Sherman Alexie, Native American poet and author
- October 19 – Dimitris Lyacos, Greek poet and playwright
- November 17 – Jane Holland, English poet and novelist (as Victoria Lamb, etc.)
- December 20 – Joseph Woods, Irish poet
- December 27 – Chris Abani, Nigerian poet
- Also:
  - Maurice Manning, American poet
  - Constance Merritt, American poet
  - Daljit Nagra, English poet
  - Richard Price, British poet, curator and editor
  - Volker Sielaff, German poet
  - Yi Sha, Chinese poet

== Deaths ==
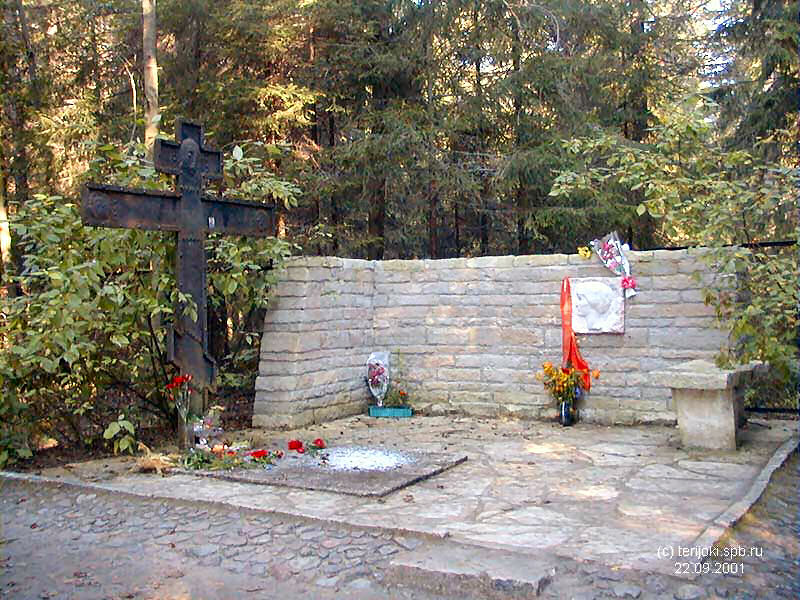
Grave of Anna Akhmatova

Birth years link to the corresponding "[year] in poetry" article:

- January 22 – Jun Kawada 川田 順, 84 (born 1882), Japanese, Shōwa period tanka poet and entrepreneur
- January 23 – Berton Braley, 83 (born 1882), American poet
- March 5 — Anna Akhmatova, 76 (born 1889), Russian poet
- March 17 – Einar Skjæraasen, 66 (born 1900), Norwegian author and poet
- March 29 – Arnold Wall, 97 (born 1869), New Zealand professor, philologist, poet, mountaineer and botanist
- April 5 – Marcel Noppeney (born 1877), Luxembourg French-language poet
- May 14 – Georgia Douglas Johnson, 86 (born 1880), African American poet and playwright, of a stroke
- June 1 – Inge Müller, 85 (born 1925), East German poet
- June 7 – Jean Arp, 79 (born 1886), French Alsatian sculptor, painter and poet, leader in Dadaism
- June 10 – Henry Treece, 54 (born 1911), English children's historical novelist and poet
- June 27 – Arthur Waley, 76 (born 1889), English translator of Chinese poetry, Orientalist and Sinologist
- July 11 – Delmore Schwartz, 52 (born 1913), American poet and short story writer, of a heart attack
- July 25 – Frank O'Hara, 40 (born 1926), American art curator and poet, key member of the New York School, of ruptured liver following automobile accident
- August 2 or 3 – Tristan Klingsor, pseudonym of Léon Leclère, 91 (born 1874), French poet, painter and musician, part of the fantaisiste school of French poets
- August 10 – J. C. Bloem, 79 (born 1887), Dutch poet
- August 12 – Artur Alliksaar, 43 (born 1923), Estonian poet, of cancer
- August 14
  - Raymond Duncan, 91 (born 1874), American-born dancer, artist, poet, craftsman and philosopher
  - Alfred Kreymborg, 82 (born 1883), American poet, novelist, playwright, literary editor and anthologist
- August 26 – W. W. E. Ross, 72 (born 1894), Canadian poet
- August 27 – John Cournos, 85 (born 1881), Russian-American Imagist poet, better known for his novels, short stories, essays, criticism and translations of Russian literature; wrote under the pen name "John Courtney"
- August 29 – Melvin B. Tolson, 68 (born 1898), African American Modernist poet, educator, columnist and politician
- September 25 – Mina Loy, 73 (born 1882), English-born American artist, poet, Futurist and actress
- September 28 – André Breton, 70 (born 1896), French poet, essayist and theorist, the leading exponent of Surrealism in literature
- December 9 – Lazarus Aaronson, 71 (born 1895), English poet and academic economist
- Also – Jun Tanaka 田中純 (born 1890), Japanese, Shōwa period poet

== See also ==
- Poetry
- List of poetry awards
- List of years in poetry
