= 1882 in poetry =

This article covers 1882 in poetry. Nationality words link to articles with information on the nation's poetry or literature (for instance, Irish or France).

== Events ==
- June 30 - Convicted assassin Charles Guiteau writes a poem called "I am Going to the Lordy", which he recites immediately before his execution the same day

== Works published ==
=== United Kingdom ===
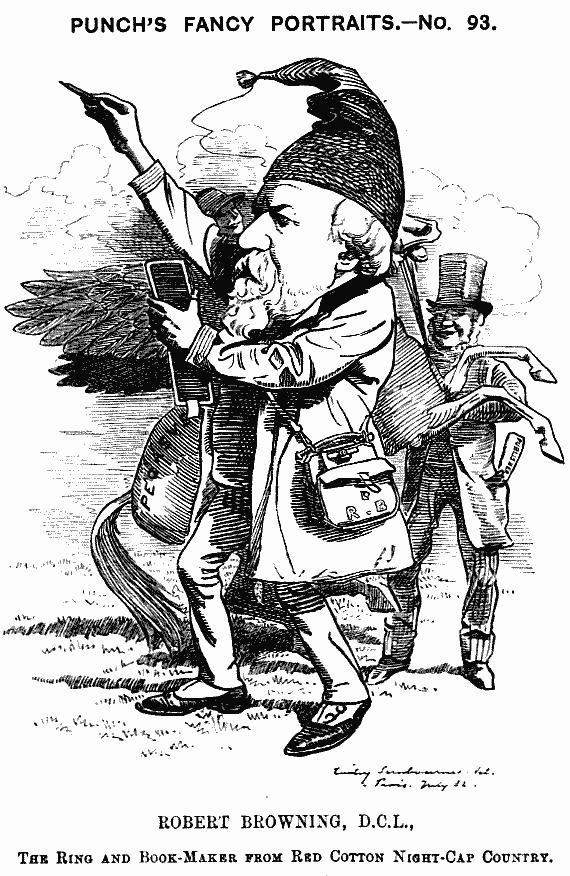
Caricature of English poet Robert Browning that appeared this year in Punch

- William Allingham, Evil May-Day
- F. J. Child, ed., The English and Scottish Popular Ballads, in 5 volumes (1882–98), including multiple versions of 305 ballads, American scholar published in England
- Toru Dutt, Ancient Ballads and Legends of Hidnustan, London: Kegan Paul, Trench, Trubner and Co. (fifth edition, 1927; reprinted several times by various publishers since then); Indian poet, writing in English, published in the United Kingdom
- William Livingston (Uilleam Macdhunleibhe, died 1870), Duain agus Orain, Scottish Gaelic poet published in Scotland
- George Robert Sims, The Dagonet Ballads
- Algernon Charles Swinburne, Tristram of Lyonesse, and Other Poems

==== Great scientist this year a published poet ====
James Clerk Maxwell (1831–1879), whose contributions to science were profound (including formulation of Maxwell's equations which for the first time expressed the basic laws of electricity and magnetism in a unified fashion, and other discoveries that helped usher in modern physics), this year became a published poet when a collection of his poems was published by his friend Lewis Campbell, two years after Maxwell's death.

As a great lover of British poetry, Maxwell memorized poems and wrote his own. The best known is Rigid Body Sings closely based on Comin' Through the Rye by Robert Burns, which he apparently used to sing while accompanying himself on a guitar. It has the immortal opening lines:

Gin a body meet a body
Flyin' through the air.
Gin a body hit a body,
Will it fly? And where?

(Maxwell is also known for creating the first true-colour photograph in 1861.)

=== United States ===
- Amos Bronson Alcott, Sonnets and Canzonets
- Thomas Bailey Aldrich, Poems
- George Henry Boker, The Book of the Dead
- Hjalmar Hjorth Boyesen, Idyls of Norway
- Paul Hamilton Hayne, Collected Poems
- Emma Lazarus, Songs of a Semite
- Henry Wadsworth Longfellow, In the Harbor: Ultima Thule, Part II
- William Gilmore Simms (died 1870), Works, 10 volumes, including poetry, New York
- Mary Ashley Townsend, Down the Bayou and Other Poems

=== Other ===
- Gabriele D'Annunzio, Canto novo, Italy
- Octave Crémazie (died 1879), Œuvres complètes, Canada
- Toru Dutt (died 1877), Ancient Ballads and Legends of Hidnustan, London: Kegan Paul, Trench, Trubner and Co. (fifth edition, 1927; reprinted several times since by various publishers), Indian poet, writing in English, published in the United Kingdom
- Kalidasa, Sakuntalam translated from the original Sanskrit into Malayalam by Kerala Varma Valiya Koil Thampuran, India
- Friedrich Nietzsche, The Gay Science (Die fröhliche Wissenschaft), Germany, a study embracing poetry, philosophy and the author's "God is dead" view
- Jacques Perk (died 1881), Mathilde, Netherlands
- Friedrich Theodor Vischer, Lyrische Gänge ("Lyrical passages"), Germany
- Iosif Vulcan, Lira mea ("My Lyre"), Romanian, published in Austria-Hungary

== Births ==
Death years link to the corresponding "[year] in poetry" article:

- January 6 – Fan Noli (died 1965), Albanian writer, scholar, archbishop and politician (Prime Minister)
- January 15 – Jun Kawada 川田 順 (died 1966), Japanese, Shōwa period tanka poet and entrepreneur
- January 18 – A. A. Milne (died 1956), English author, playwright and writer of children's poetry best known for his books about the teddy bear, Winnie-the-Pooh, and for various children's poems
- February 2 – James Joyce (died 1941), Irish writer and poet, widely considered to be one of the most influential writers of the twentieth century
- February 4 – E. J. Pratt (died 1964), Canadian poet
- February 6 – Anne Spencer (died 1975), American Black poet and active participant in the New Negro Movement
- February 9 – James Stephens (died 1950), Irish novelist and poet (said he was born on this date; some think it may have been two years earlier (1880))
- February 10 – Winifred Mary Letts (died 1972), English writer
- March 24 – Enid Derham (died 1941), Australian poet and academic
- May 5 – Kyōsuke Kindaichi 金田一 京助 (died 1971), Japanese linguist and poet, father of linguist Haruhiko Kindaichi
- May 14 – Mokichi Saitō (died 1953), Japanese, Taishō period poet of the Araragi school and psychiatrist, father of novelist Kita Morio
- June 1 – John Drinkwater (died 1937), English poet and dramatist
- June 5 – Seemab Akbarabadi سیماب اکبرآبادی, born Aashiq Hussain Siddiqui (died 1951), Urdu poet from India
- July 13 – Catherine Pozzi (died 1934), French poet and woman of letters
- July 22 – Frederic Manning (died 1935), Australian poet and novelist
- September 17 – Darrell Figgis (suicide 1925), Irish poet and nationalist
- September 23 – Brian Vrepont (died 1955), Australian
- October 2 – Martin Armstrong (died 1974), English writer and poet
- November 26 – Ikuma Arishima, 有島生馬 pen-name (together with Utosei and then Jugatsutei) of Arishima Mibuma (died 1974), Japanese novelist, poet and painter; member of the Shirakaba literary circle
- December 3 – Santōka Taneda 種田 山頭火 pen name of Taneda Shōichi 種田 正一 (died 1940), author and haiku poet
- December 5 – Natalia Negru (died 1962), Romanian poet
- December 11 – Subramania Bharati (died 1921), Tamil writer, poet, journalist, Indian independence activist and social reformer
- December 27 – Mina Loy (died 1966), English artist, poet, Futurist, actor, Christian Scientist, designer of lamps and bohemian
- Also:
  - C. Subrahamania Bharati (died 1921), Indian, Tamil-language poet also writing Indian poetry in English
  - Wallace Gould (died 1940), American

== Deaths ==
Birth years link to the corresponding "[year] in poetry" article:

- February 8 – Berthold Auerbach (born 1812), German-Jewish poet and novelist
- March 29 – Sibella Elizabeth Miles (born 1800), English poet, writer and schoolteacher
- April 10 – Dante Gabriel Rossetti 63, English poet, illustrator, painter and translator
- April 23 – William Brighty Rands (born 1823), English writer of nursery rhymes
- April 27 – Ralph Waldo Emerson, 78, American author, poet and philosopher
- March 24 – Henry Wadsworth Longfellow, 75, American poet
- June 3 – James Thomson, 48, British poet whose fame rests primarily upon the reputation of his long poem of 1874, The City of Dreadful Night
- June 30 – Charles J. Guiteau, (born 1841), American writer and lawyer, assassin of United States President James A. Garfield
- August 1 – Henry Kendall (born 1839), Australian
- August 25 (August 13 O.S.) – Friedrich Reinhold Kreutzwald (born 1803), Estonian author and poet
- October 30 – William Forster (born 1818), Australian politician, Premier of New South Wales and poet
- Also:
  - Charles R. Thatcher (born c. 1831), Australian

== See also ==
- 19th century in poetry
- 19th century in literature
- List of years in poetry
- List of years in literature
- Victorian literature
- French literature of the 19th century
- Poetry
