= 1975 in poetry =

Nationality words link to articles with information on the nation's poetry or literature (for instance, Irish or France).

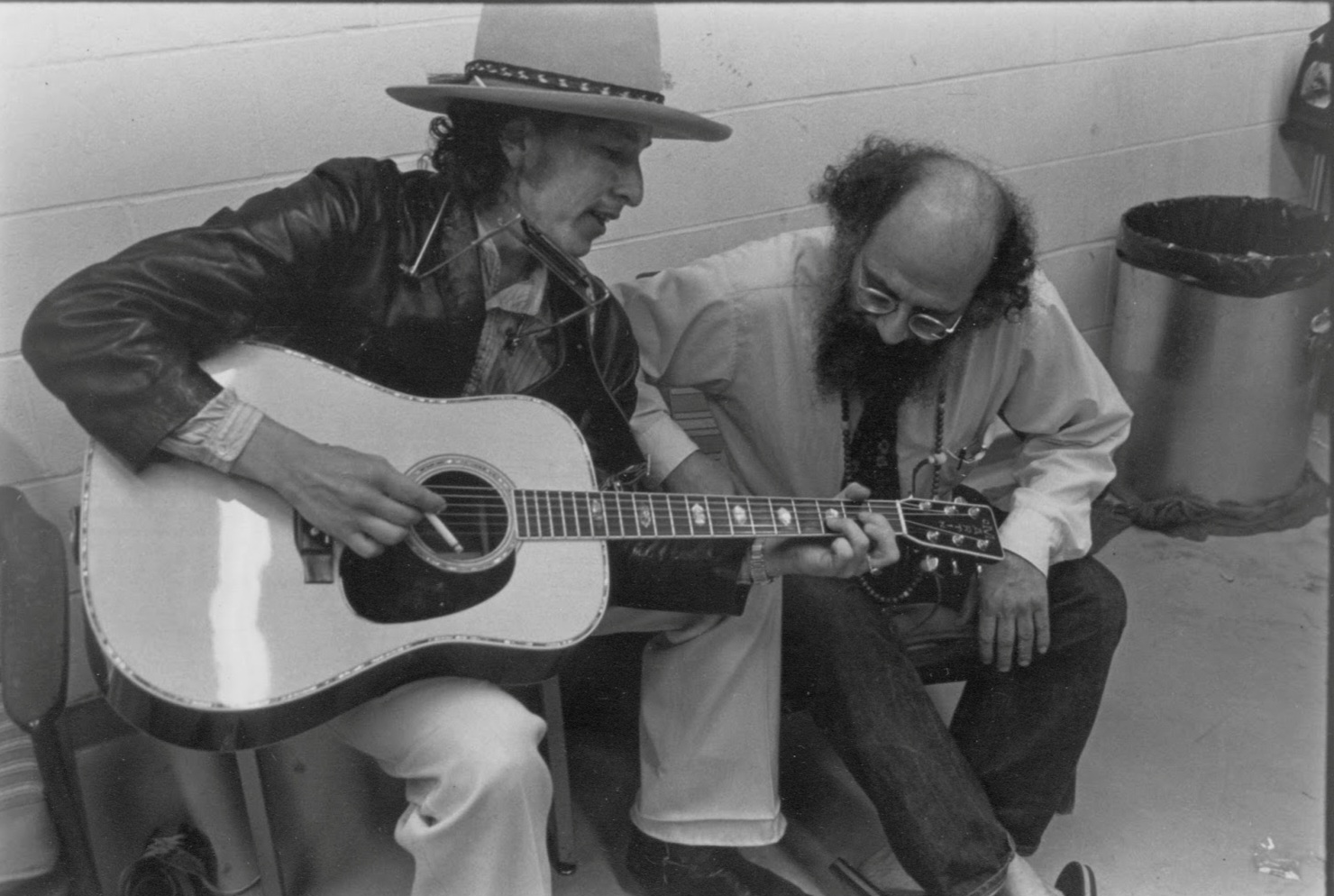
Singer Bob Dylan and poet Allen Ginsberg, 1975

== Events ==
- Following the fall of the Greek military junta in 1974, poets, authors and intellectuals who had fled after the coup of 1967 return, and this year many begin publishing in that country.
- Radical Australian poet Dorothy Hewett publishes her collection Rapunzel in Suburbia, triggering a successful libel action by her lawyer ex-husband Lloyd Davies.
- Brick Books, a small literary press, is founded in London, Ontario, by Stan Dragland and Don McKay to publish work by Canadian poets, initially as a publisher of chapbooks.

== Works published in English ==
Listed by nation where the work was first published and again by the poet's native land, if different; substantially revised works listed separately:

=== Australia ===
- Gwen Harwood, Selected Poems
- Dorothy Hewett, Rapunzel in Suburbia
- A. D. Hope:
  - "Country Places : Hell, Hay and Booligal!"
  - A Late Picking : Poems 1965-1974
- Kate Jennings, Mother I'm Rooted : An Anthology of Australian Women Poets (edited)
- Jennifer Maiden:
  - The Problem of Evil, Prism
  - The Occupying Forces, Gargoyle
- Geoff Page, Smalltown Memorials, (St Lucia: University of Queensland Press)

=== Canada ===
- Earle Birney, The collected poems of Earle Birney. Toronto: McClelland and Stewart.
- Don Domanski, The Cape Breton Book of the Dead
- Louis Dudek. Selected Poems. Ottawa: Golden Dog, 1975.
- Archibald Lampman, * Lampman's Kate: Late Love Poems of Archibald Lampman, Margaret Coulby Whitridge ed. (Ottawa: Borealis).
- Irving Layton, The Darkening Fire: Selected Poems, 1945–1968. Toronto: McClelland and Stewart.
- Irving Layton, The Unwavering Eye: Selected Poems, 1969–1975. Toronto: McClelland and Stewart.
- Dorothy Livesay, Ice Age. Erin, ON: Porcepic.
- James Reaney, Selected Shorter Poems, Erin: Porcepic.
- Joe Rosenblatt, Dream Craters. Press Porcepic.
- Joe Rosenblatt, Virgins & Vampires. McClelland & Stewart.
- Raymond Souster, Double Header: As Is; Lost & Found. Ottawa: Oberon Press.
- Raymond Souster, Rain Check. Ottawa:Oberon Press.
- Raymond Souster and Richard Woollatt, eds. These Loved, These Hated Lands. Toronto: Doubleday.
- George Woodcock, Notes on Visitations: Poems 1936-75, Toronto: Anansi, Canada

=== India in English ===
- Ruskin Bond, Lone Fox Dancing: Lyric Poems, Calcutta: Writers Workshop, India .
- G. S. Sharat Chandra, Offsprings of Servagna, Calcutta: Writers Workshop, India.
- Rita Dalmiya, Poems, Calcutta: Writers Workshop, India
- Mary Ann Das Gupta, The Circus of Love, Calcutta: Writers Workshop, India
- Prabhu Siddartha Guptara, Beginnings, Calcutta: Writers Workshop, India
- Pranab Bandyopadhyay, The Voice of the Indian Poets: An Anthology of Indian Poetry, Calcutta: United Writers

=== Ireland ===
- Eavan Boland, The War Horse, Irish poet published in the United Kingdom
- Paul Durcan, O Westport in the Light of Asia Minor, Irish poet published in the United Kingdom
- Seamus Heaney, Northern Ireland poet published in the United Kingdom:
  - Stations, Ulsterman Publications
  - North, Faber & Faber
  - Bog Poems, Rainbow Press
- Derek Mahon, The Snow Party. Oxford University Press, Northern Ireland poet published in the United Kingdom
- Eiléan Ní Chuilleanáin: Site of Ambush, Dublin: The Gallery Press

=== New Zealand ===
- Alistair Campbell, Dreams, Yellow Lions
- Lauris Edmond, In Middle Air
- Bill Manhire, Song Cycle, New Zealand
- Ian Wedde:
  - Earthly: Sonnets for Carlos
  - Pathway to the Sea

=== United Kingdom ===
- Arthur J. Ball, Collected Poems
- Thomas Blackburn, Selected Poems
- Eavan Boland, The War Horse Irish poet published in the United Kingdom
- Edwin Brock, The Blocked Heart
- Alan Brownjohn, A Song of Good Life
- Charles Causley, Collected Poems 1951–1975 (see also Collected Poems 1997)
- Maureen Duffy, Evesong
- Paul Durcan, O Westport in the Light of Asia Minor, Irish poet published in the United Kingdom
- John Fuller, The Mountain in the Sea
- Roy Fuller, From the Joke Shop
- Roger Garfitt, West of Elm
- Robert Graves, Collected Poems
- Seamus Heaney, Northern Ireland poet published in the United Kingdom:
  - Stations, Ulsterman Publications
  - North, Faber & Faber
  - Bog Poems, Rainbow Press
- John Heath-Stubbs, A Parliament of Birds
- Adrian Henri, The Best of Henri: Selected Poems 1960–70, London: Jonathan Cape, ISBN 978-0-224-01148-8
- Geoffrey Hill, Somewhere is Such a Kingdom
- Michael Ivens, Born Early
- Clive James, The Fate of Felicity Fark in the Land of the Media: a moral poem, Australian poet resident in the United Kingdom
- Elizabeth Jennings, Growing-Points
- Linton Kwesi Johnson, Dread, Beat and' Blood
- George MacBeth, In the Hours Waiting for the Blood to Come
- Derek Mahon, The Snow Party. Oxford University Press, Northern Ireland poet published in the United Kingdom
- Christopher Middleton, The Lonely Suppers of W. V. Balloon
- Adrian Mitchell, The Apeman Cometh
- Norman Nicholson, Cloud on Black Combe
- Leslie Norris, Mountains, Polecats, Pheasants and other Elegies
- Ruth Pitter, End of Drought
- Peter Porter, Living in a Calm Country
- J. H. Prynne, High Pink on Chrome
- James Reeves, Collected Poems
- Edgell Rickword, Collected Poems
- Alan Ross, Open Sea
- Vernon Scannell, The Loving Game: poems
- Peter Scupham, Prehistories
- Henry Shore, Selected Poems
- Iain Sinclair, Lud Heat
- Stevie Smith, Collected Poems
- R. S. Thomas, Laboratories of the Spirit, Welsh
- J. R. Tolkien, translator, Sir Gawain and the Green Knight, Pearl and Sir Orfeo
- John Wain, Feng: a poem
- Hugo Williams, Some Sweet Day

==== Anthologies in the United Kingdom ====
- John Barrell and John Bull (eds), The Penguin Book of English Pastoral Verse
- J. M. Cohen, A Choice of Comic and Curious Verse
- Peter Redgrove (ed.), Lamb and Thundercloud, from the Arvon Foundation creative writing courses at Totleigh Barton Manor in Devon
- Wole Soyinka (ed.), Poems of Black Africa, Heinemann African Writers Series; published in the United Kingdom; Martin Secker & Warburg Ltd, ISBN 978-0-436-47820-8, published in April (also published in the United States, in May)
- Poetry Introduction (Faber & Faber) the third in the series
- Treble Poets (Chatto & Windus)

==== Criticism, scholarship and biography in the United Kingdom ====
- Edward Lucie-Smith, The Burnt Child, autobiography
- Norman Nicholson, Wednesday Early Closing, autobiography
- Laurie Lee, I Can't Stay Long, mostly travel pieces by this poet
- Kathleen Raine, The Land Unknown, autobiography

=== United States ===
- A.R. Ammons, Diversifications: Poems
- Maya Angelou, Oh Pray My Wings are Gonna Fit Me Well
- John Ashbery:
  - Self-portrait in a Convex Mirror later awarded the Pulitzer Prize, the National Book Award, and the National Book Critics Circle Award
  - Vermont Notebook
- Ted Berrigan, A Feeling For Leaving
- Gwendolyn Brooks, Beckonings
- Lin Carter, Dreams from R'lyeh
- Robert Creeley, Backwards and The Door: Selected Poems
- Ed Dorn and Jennifer Dunbar, Manchester Square, Permanent Press
- Ed Dorn, Collected Poems: 1956–1974, Four Seasons Foundation
- Allen Ginsberg, "Hadda be Playin' on a Jukebox"
- Marilyn Hacker, Presentation Piece
- Michael S. Harper, Nightmare Begins Responsibility
- John Hollander, Tales Told of the Fathers
- Erica Jong, Loveroot
- Kenneth Koch, The Art of Love
- W. S. Merwin, The First Four Books of Poems, containing A Mask for Janus, The Dancing Bears, Green with Beasts, and The Drunk in the Furnace, New York: Atheneum; (reprinted in 2000, Port Townsend, Washington: Copper Canyon Press)
- Joyce Carol Oates, The Fabulous Beasts
- George Oppen, Collected Poems (New Directions)
- Charles Olson, The Maximus Poems, third volume (posthumous)
- Carl Rakosi, Ex Cranium, Night
- Charles Reznikoff, Holocaust
- Adrienne Rich, Poems: Selected and New, 1950–1974
- Charles Wright, Bloodlines

==== Anthologies in the United States ====
- Duane Niatum (ed.), Carriers of the Dream Wheel: Contemporary Native American Poetry, New York: Harper, anthology ISBN 0-06-451151-0
- Kenneth Rosen (ed.), Voices of the Rainbow: Contemporary Poetry by American Indians, New York: Viking Press
- Wole Soyinka (ed.), Poems of Black Africa, part of the Heinemann African Writers Series; Farrar, Straus & Giroux, published in May (published in April in the United Kingdom), ISBN 978-0-8090-7747-2

==== Criticism, scholarship and biography in the United States ====
- John Hollander, Vision and Resonance, criticism
- Reed Whittemore, William Carlos Williams: Poet from Jersey

=== Other in English ===
- Maki Kureishi, Taufiq Rafat and Kaleem Omar, Wordfall, Oxford University Press, English-language poetry published in Pakistan
- Wole Soyinka, editor, Poems of Black Africa, part of the Heinemann African Writers Series; published in the United Kingdom; Martin Secker & Warburg Ltd, ISBN 978-0-436-47820-8 (also published in the United States this year)

== Works published in other languages ==
Listed by language and often by nation where the work was first published and again by the poet's native land, if different; substantially revised works listed separately:

=== Arabic ===
- Adonis, Al-Aghani al-Thania Li Mehyar al-Dimashki ("The Second Songs of Mihyar al-Dimashki"), Syria
- Mahmood Darwish, a book of poems? (Palestine)
- Abdel Wahhab al-Bayyati, a book of poems? (Iraq)
- Amal Dankal, a book of poems? (Egypt)

=== Denmark ===
- Thorkild Bjørnvig:
  - Delfinen
  - Stoffets krystalhav
- Henrik Nordbrandt, Ode til blæksprutten og andre kærlighedsdigte ("Ode to the Octopus and Other Love Poems"), Copenhagen: Gylendal, 55 pages

=== French language ===
==== France ====
- Anne-Marie Albiach:
  - Césure: le corps
  - Le Double
- Jean l'Anselme, La Foire à la ferraille
- Yves Bonnefoy, Dans le leurre du seuil ("The Lure of the Threshold"), long poem with an epic tone and allusions to classical literature
- Charles Bory, L'Enfant-soleil et la croix
- Philippe Denis, Les Cendres de la voix
- Robert Desnos, Destinée arbitraire, published posthumously (died 1945)
- Philippe Dumaine, Aux Passeurs de la nuit
- Jacques Dupin, Debors
- Jean Pourtal de Ladevèze, De La Source azurine
- Pierre Loubière, Poèmes à la craie
- Saint-John Perse, Chant pour un équinoxe , Paris: Gallimard
- Jean-Louis Vallas, Resonances de Paris

===== Criticism and scholarship =====
- Robert Sabatier, Histoire de la poésie française
  - volume on the Middle Ages to the sixteenth century
  - volume on the seventeenth and eighteenth centuries

=== German language ===
==== West Germany ====
- Herbert Asmodi, Jokers Gala
- Rolf Dieter Brinkmann, Westwärts 1 und 2 (posthumous)
- Frank Geerk, Notwehr
- Klaus Konjetsky, Poem vom Grünen Eck
- Kaspar H. Spinner, Zur Struktur des lyrischen Ich Frankfurt am Main: Akademische Verlagsgesellschaft (scholarship)

=== Greece ===
- Kostas Varnalis, Orgi laou
- Nikiforos Vrettakos, Diamartiria
- Kostas Stergiopoulos, Eklipsi
- Yiorgos Yeralis, Elliniki nikhta
- Yannis Ritsos:
  - Kodonostasio
  - O tikhos mesa ston kathrefti
  - Hartina
  - Petrinos khronos (written in the Makronisos concentration camp in 1949)
  - Imnos kai thrinos yia tin Kipro, about the Turkish invasion of Cyprus
  - Meletes, a book of essays

=== Hebrew ===
- M. Dor, Mappot Hazeman
- Haim Gouri, Ad Kav Ha-Nesher ("The Eagle Line"), by an Israeli writing in Hebrew
- Y. Ratosh, three slim volumes which appeared simultaneously
- I. Pinkas, Al Kav Hamashveh
- Y. Ratosh, three slim volumes which appeared simultaneously
- D. Rokeah, Ir Shezemana Kayitz
- Y. Tan-Pai, Olam Kazeh Olam Kaba
- A. Trainin, Ha-Shaar Hasotum
- Nathan Yonathan, Shirim

=== India ===
Listed in alphabetical order by first name:

- Amarjit Chandan, Kauan Nahin Chahega, Rangshala, Chandigarh; Punjabi-language
- K. Siva Reddy, Charya, Hyderabad: Jhari Poetry Circle, Telugu-language
- Namdeo Dhasal, Moorkha Mhatarayane Dongar Halavile; Marathi-language
- Nilmani Phookan, Kaint Golap Aru Kaint, Guwahati, Assam: Dutta Barua, Assamese-language
- Rajendra Kishore Panda, Gouna Devata, Patanagarh, Orissa: Varnamala, Oraya-language
- Suresh Joshi, Pratyancha, Indian, Gujarati-language

=== Italy ===
- Carlo Bordini, Strana categoria
- Pier Paolo Pasolini, La nuova gioventú
- Giovanni Raboni, Cadenza d'inganno

==== Anthology ====
- Marco Forti (ed.), Almanacco dello Specchio for 1975, an anthology (from Arnoldo Mondadori's publishing house) that includes poems by Eugenio Montale, Mario Luzi, Albino Pierro, Vasco Pratolini, Pier Paolo Pasolini, Giovanni Testori, Giovanni Guiducci, Rossana Ombres

=== Portuguese language ===
==== Portugal ====
- A. Ramos Rosa, Animal Olhar
- Fiama Brandão, Novas Visões do Passado
- A.-F. Alexandre, Sem Palavras nem Coisas

=== Russia ===
- N. Dorizo, The Sword of Victory. Verses, Poems and Songs
- Yu. Drunina, The Star of the Trenches. New Poems
- K. Vanshenkin, Campfire Reminiscences. Wartime Lyrics
- Ya. Smelyakov, Verses of Many Years
- B. Kunyayev, Devotion. Poems
- I. Molchanov, Half a Century. Verses
- G. Korshak, The Stellar Hour
- I. Ulyanova, Birch Tree Rain
- A. Roshka, Steel and Flint (translated into Russian from Moldavian)
- S. Eraliyev, Herald's Word (translated into Russian from Kirgiz)

==== Soviet anthology ====
- Winds of Different Colors

=== Spanish language ===
==== Spain ====
- Vicente Gaos, Diez siglos de poesía
- Luis Cernuda, Antología poetica, introduction and selection by Philip Silver

==== Latin America ====
- Juan Gonzalo Rose, Obra poética (Peru)
- Javier Sologuren, translator from Swiss, Italian and French, Las uvas del racimo (Peru)
- Raúl Gonzáles Tuñón, Antología poética (Argentina), posthumous
- Margit Frenk, Cancionero folklórico, anthology of popular poetry
- Juan Gelman, Obra poética (Argentina)
- Pablo Antonio Cuadra, Tierra que habla (Nicaragua)
- Roberto Fernández Retamar, Cuaderno paralelo (Cuba)
- Jorge Enrique Adoum, Informe personal sobre la situación (Ecuador)
- Olga Orozco, Museo salvage (Argentina)
- Hernán Levín, El que a hierro mata (Chile)
- Octavio Paz, Children of the Mire: Modern Poetry from Romanticism to the Avant-Garde, text of his Charles Eliot Norton lectures at Harvard for 1971–72
- José Coronel Urteche, Rápido tránsito, critical essays

=== Sweden ===
- Kjell Espmark, Det obevekliga paradiset, the last volume of a trilogy
- Claes Andersson, Rums kamrater
- Ylva Eggehorn, Han Kommer

=== Yiddish ===
- Hirsch Osherovich, The World of Sacrifices
- Arye Shamri, Rings in Stem
- Hillel Shargel, A Tree in the Window
- Moshe Shklar, In Imagination Sealed
- Moyshe Nadir, A Day in a Garden
- Aleph Katz, Morning Star
- Jacob Friedmann, Poems and Songs, three volumes (posthumous)

=== Other ===
- Zbigniew Herbert, Mr. Cogito, which was translated into 15 languages and dramatized in 1975; Poland
- Ndoc Gjetja, Shqiponja rreh krahët ("Beats Eagle Wings"), Albania
- Miroslav Holub, a book of poetry? Czechoslovakia: Czech
- Julian Przyboś, Poems and Notes (posthumous), Poland
- Jan Skacel, a book of poetry? Czechoslovakia: Czech
- Nichita Stănescu, selected poems Romania
- Ion Alexandru, selected poems Romania

== Awards and honors ==
- Nobel Prize for Literature: Eugenio Montale, Italian poet, prose writer, editor and translator

=== English language ===
==== Australia ====
- Grace Leven Prize for Poetry: Gwen Harwood, Selected Poems

==== Canada ====
- See 1975 Governor General's Awards for a complete list of winners and finalists for those awards

==== United Kingdom ====
- Cholmondeley Award: Jenny Joseph, Norman MacCaig, John Ormond
- Eric Gregory Award: John Birtwhistle, Duncan Bush, Val Warner, Philip Holmes, Peter Cash, Alasdair Paterson

==== United States ====
- Bollingen Prize: Archie Randolph Ammons
- National Book Award for Poetry: Marilyn Hacker, Presentation Piece
- Pulitzer Prize for Poetry: Gary Snyder, Turtle Island
- Walt Whitman Award: Reg Saner, Climbing into the Roots
- Fellowship of the Academy of American Poets: Robert Hayden
- Lenore Marshall Poetry Prize: Cid Corman, O/I (Judge: Hayden Carruth)

=== French language ===
==== France ====
- Prix Appolinaire: Charles Le Quintrec, jeunesse de Dieu
- Grand Prix de poésie of the French Academy: Gabriel Audisio, Racine de tout

=== Spanish language ===
- Casa de las Américas prizes:
  - Omar Lara (Chile), ¡Oh buenas maneras!
  - Manuel Orestes Nieto (Panama), Dar la cara

=== Other ===
- A Soviet state prizes for poetry:
  - K. Kuliyev, The Book of the Earth
  - L. Martynov, Hyperboles

== Births ==
- August 13 – Andrea Gibson (died 2025), American poet
- August 20 – Matthew and Michael Dickman, American poets
- December 21 – Srijato (Srijato Bandopadhyay), Bengali poet
- Nick Laird, Northern Ireland-born poet and novelist
- Tony Tost, American poet
- Razvan Tupa, Romanian poet

== Deaths ==
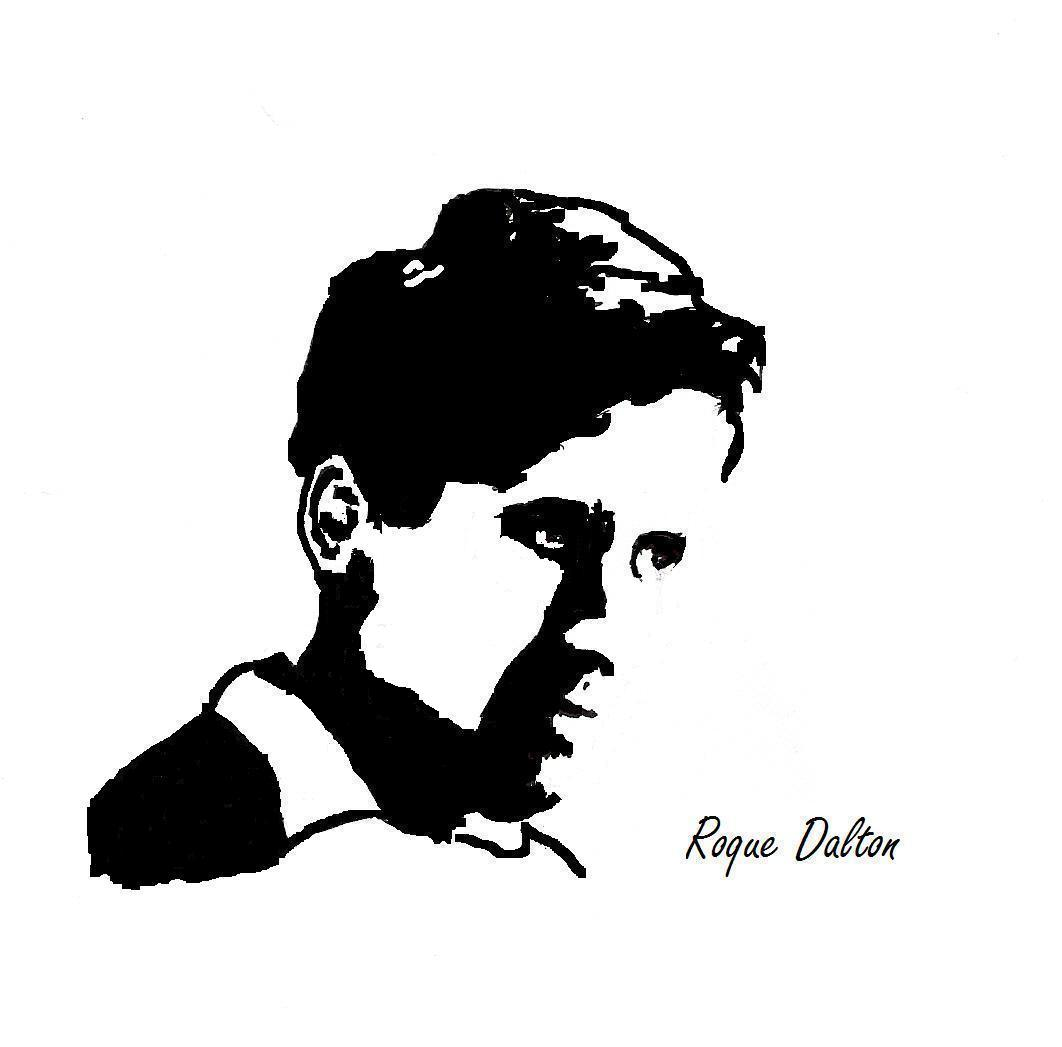
Roque Dalton

Birth years link to the corresponding "[year] in poetry" article:

- January 15 – Sydney Goodsir Smith, 59 (born 1915), New Zealand–Scots poet, artist, dramatist and novelist who wrote poetry in literary Scots often referred to as Lallans; a major figure of the Scottish Renaissance
- January 18 – Chester Kallman, 53 (born 1921), American-born poet and librettist
- January 21 – Mascha Kaléko, 67 (born 1907), German-language poet
- February 5 – Janko Glazer, 81 (born 1893), Slovenian poet, literary historian, librarian and editor
- February 10 – Nikos Kavvadias, 65 (born 1910), Russian-born Greek poet and sailor
- February 14 – Sir Julian Sorell Huxley (born 1887), English evolutionary biologist, humanist and internationalist
- March 2 – Helen Cruickshank (born 1886), Scottish poet, suffragette and nationalist
- March 3 – Sir T. H. Parry-Williams (born 1887), Welsh poet, translator and academic
- March 22 – Stanley Young, 69 (born 1906), American poet, playwright, publisher and literary reviewer
- April 23 – Rolf Dieter Brinkmann, 35 (born 1940) German poet, killed in hit-and-run-accident in London
- May 10 – Roque Dalton, 39 (born 1935), leftist Salvadoran poet, journalist and political activist who wrote on death, love and politics, executed
- July 10 – Sir Francis Meynell, 84 (born 1891), English poet
- August 3 – Andreas Embirikos, 73 (born 1901), Greek surrealist poet and psychoanalyst
- August 5 – Vojko Gorjan, 26 (born 1949), Slovenian postmodernist poet
- September 4 – Shigeji Tsuboi 壺井繁治 (born 1897), Japanese poet
- September 20 – Saint-John Perse, 88, French diplomat and poet, winner of the Nobel Prize in Literature in 1960
- September 24(?) – Pat Lowther, 40 (born 1935), Canadian poet, murdered by her husband, Roy Lowther
- October 27 – Vayalar Ramavarma, 47 (born 1928), Indian, Malayalam-language poet and film songwriter
- October 28 – Patrice de La Tour du Pin, 64 (born 1911), French writer
- November 2 – Pier Paolo Pasolini, 53, Italian film director, author and poet

== Notes ==
- Britannica Book of the Year 1976 ("for events of 1975"), published by Encyclopædia Britannica 1976 (source of many items in "Works published" section and rarely in other sections)

== See also ==
- Poetry
- List of poetry awards
- List of years in poetry
