= 1887 in poetry =

This article covers 1887 in poetry. Nationality words link to articles with information on the nation's poetry or literature (for instance, Irish or France).

== Works published ==
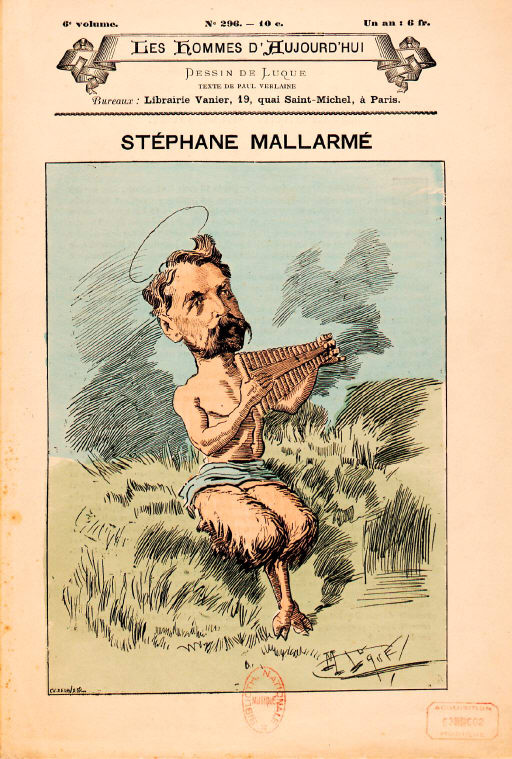
Caricature of the French poet Stéphane Mallarmé

=== British Australia ===
- Henry Lawson, "A Song for the Republic", English, the author's first published poem, in The Bulletin, October 1 issue; Australia

=== British India ===
- Narsinhrao Divetia, Kusumamala, Gujarati, his first collection of poems, "considered a definite advance in modern Gujarati poetry because of its novel use of poetic diction", according to A handbook of Indian Literature
- Kandukuri Veeresalingam, Narada Samvadam, Telugu long poem condemning banal, rule-minded poetry

=== Canada ===
- George Frederick Cameron, Lyrics on Freedom, Love and Death, English, posthumously published (by his brother).
- Louis-Honoré Fréchette, La légende d'un peuple, French, the author's best-known work, about episodes of Canadian history; French Canadian author published in Paris
- Sarah Anne Curzon, Laura Secord, the Heroine of 1812: A Drama, and Other Poems, English.
- Susie Frances ed. The Canadian Birthday Book, English, poetry anthology. (Toronto: Robinson).
- William Douw Lighthall, Thoughts, Moods and Ideals: Crimes of Leisure, English. ("Witness" Printing House).
- Thomas O'Hagan, A Gate of birginas, English.

=== France ===
- François Coppée, Arriere-saison; French
- Stéphane Mallarmé; all in French:
  - Poésies ("Poetical Works"), in a deluxe, limited edition published in October
  - Album de vers et de prose ("Selected Verse and Prose"), published in December

=== Ireland ===
- William Butler Yeats, editor, Poems and Ballads of Young Ireland, English, an anthology, Dublin, Ireland

=== United Kingdom ===
- William Allingham, Rhymes for Young Folk, English.
- Robert Browning, Parleyings with Certain People of Importance in their Day, English.
- Richard Le Gallienne, My Lady's Sonnets, English.
- George Meredith, Ballads and Poems of Tragic Life, English.
- Constance Naden, A modern apostle; The elixir of life; The story of Clarice, and other poems, English.
- Robert Louis Stevenson, Underwoods, English.
- Algernon Charles Swinburne, The Jubilee, English.
- Katharine Tynan, Shamrocks, English, published in the United Kingdom by an Irish poet.

=== United States ===
- Charles Follen Adams, Dialect Ballads, English
- Amos Bronson Alcott, New Connecticut, English
- Arlo Bates, Sonnets in Shadow, English
- Palmer Cox, The Brownies: Their Book, English, children's fictional poetry
- Emma Lazarus, By The Waters of Babylon, English
- Jessie Wilson Manning, The passion of life, English
- Lizette Woodworth Reese, A Branch of May, English
- James Whitcomb Riley, Afterwhiles, English

== Births ==
Death years link to the corresponding "[year] in poetry" article:

- January 10 – Robinson Jeffers (died 1962), American poet and playwright
- February 3 – Georg Trakl (suicide 1914), German
- February 11 – Shinobu Orikuchi 折口 信夫, also known as Chōkū Shaku 釋 迢空 (died 1953), Japanese ethnologist, linguist, folklorist, novelist and poet; a disciple of Kunio Yanagita, he establishes an academic field named "Orikuchiism" (折口学, Orikuchigaku), a mix of Japanese folklore, Japanese classics and Shintō religion (surname: Orikuchi)
- March 9 – Ion Buzdugan, born Ivan Alexandrovici Buzdâga (died 1967), Bessarabian-Romanian poet, folklorist and politician
- May 10 – J. C. Bloem (died 1966), Dutch
- May 13 – Nagata Mikihiko 長田幹彦 (died 1964), Shōwa period poet, playwright and screenwriter (surname: Nagata)
- May 15 – Edwin Muir (died 1959), Scottish poet, novelist and translator
- May 16 – Jakob van Hoddis (died 1942), German
- May 31 - Saint-John Perse (died 1975), French diplomat, poet and winner of the Nobel Prize for literature in 1960
- June 20 – Kurt Schwitters (died 1947), German
- June 22 – Sir Julian Sorell Huxley (died 1975), English evolutionary biologist, humanist and internationalist
- June 28 – Orrick Glenday Johns (died 1946), American poet
- August 3 – Rupert Brooke (died on active service off Skyros, 1915), English poet
- August 19 – Francis Ledwidge (killed in action near Ypres in Belgium, 1917), Irish poet, "poet of the blackbirds"
- September 1 – Blaise Cendrars, pen name of Frédéric Louis Sauser (died 1961), Swiss novelist and poet naturalized as a French citizen in 1916
- September 7 – Edith Sitwell (died 1964), English poet and critic
- September 21 – Sir Thomas Herbert Parry-Williams (died 1975), Welsh poet, translator and academic
- September 16 – Hans Arp (died 1966), German
- September 27 – Frederick Macartney (died 1980), Australian
- October 11 – Pierre Jean Jouve (died 1976), French poet and novelist
- October 30 – Georg Heym (drowned 1912), German poet
- November 15 – Marianne Moore (died 1972), American Modernist poet and writer
- December 6 – Minakami Takitarō 水上滝太郎 pen name of Abe Shōzō (died 1940), Japanese, Shōwa period poet, novelist, literary critic and essayist (surname: Minakami)
- December 8 – Elizabeth Daryush (died 1977), English poet, daughter of Robert Bridges
- December 27 – Edward Andrade (died 1971), English physicist and poet.
- December 30 – K.M. Munshi (died 1971), Indian Gujarati-language novelist, playwright, writer, politician and lawyer
- Also:
  - Skipwith Cannell (died 1957), American poet associated with the Imagist group (pronounce his last name with the stress on the second syllable)
  - Margaret Curran (died 1962), Australian poet, editor and journalist
  - Alphonse Métérié (died 1967), French newspaper editor, teacher and poet
  - Ramnarayan V. Pathak (died 1955), Indian, Gujarati-language poet and husband of Heera Pathak
  - Sukumar Ray (সুকুমার রায়) (died 1923), Indian, Gujarati-language humorous poet, short-story writer and playwright
  - Jatindranath Sengupta (died 1954), Indian, Gujarati-language poet and writer

== Deaths ==
Birth years link to the corresponding "[year] in poetry" article:

- February 27 – Edward Rowland Sill, American
- July 15 – Adrien Rouquette (born 1813), American poet and missionary
- October 12 – Dinah Maria Mulock Craik, born Dinah Maria Mulock, also referred to as Miss Mulock or Mrs. Craik (born 1826), English novelist and poet
- November 19 – Emma Lazarus (born 1849), American poet who wrote the sonnet "The New Colossus", associated with the Statue of Liberty, where it is engraved on a plaque
- date not known – Isabella Valancy Crawford (born 1850), Canadian, from heart failure

== See also ==
- 19th century in poetry
- 19th century in literature
- List of years in poetry
- List of years in literature
- Victorian literature
- French literature of the 19th century
- Symbolist poetry
- Poetry
