= Wanderings =

Wanderings may refer to:

- Synchronistic Wanderings, a compilation album by American rock singer Pat Benatar
- The Wanderings of Oisin, an epic poem published by William Butler Yeats in 1889
- The Wanderings of Oisin and Other Poems, the first collection of poems by William Butler Yeats
- Wanderings of Sanmao, a Chinese animated TV series based on the manhua character Sanmao
- Wanderings: Chaim Potok's History of the Jews, first published in 1978 by Knopf
