= 1886 in poetry =

This article covers 1886 in poetry. Nationality words link to articles with information on the nation's poetry or literature (for instance, Irish or France).

== Events ==
- September 18 – The "Symbolist Manifesto" (Le Symbolisme) is published in French newspaper Le Figaro by Greek-born poet Jean Moréas, who announces that Symbolism is hostile to "plain meanings, declamations, false sentimentality and matter-of-fact description," and that its goal instead is to "clothe the Ideal in a perceptible form" whose "goal was not in itself, but whose sole purpose was to express the Ideal"
- December 10 – American poet Emily Dickinson dies aged 55 of Bright's disease at the family home in Amherst, Massachusetts with fewer than a dozen of her poems published and is buried under the self-penned epitaph "Called Back". Following first publication of a collection of her poems in 1890, she will become regarded (with Walt Whitman) as one of the two quintessential nineteenth-century American poets

== Works published in English ==
=== Canada ===
- Charles Mair, Tecumseh: A Drama, a closet drama in blank verse; published in Toronto.
- Charles G. D. Roberts, In Divers Tones. (Boston: Lothrop).

=== United Kingdom ===
- William Alexander, St. Augustine's Holiday, and Other Poems
- Rudyard Kipling, Departmental Ditties, and Other Verse
- Edith Nesbit, Lays and Legends, first series (see also second series 1892)
- Dante Gabriel Rossetti, Collected Works, posthumously published
- Alfred Lord Tennyson, Locksley Hall Sixty Years After
- William Butler Yeats, Mosada: A Dramatic Poem a short verse play in three scenes, published as a pamphlet of 100 copies paid for by his father (Yeats' first published work outside a journal), Irish poet published in the United Kingdom

=== United States ===
- Charles Follen Adams, Cut, Cut Behind!
- William Ellery Channing, John Brown and the Heroes of Harpers Ferry
- Celia Thaxter, Idyls and Pastorals
- Jones Very, Poems and Essays
- John Greenleaf Whittier, St. Gregory's Guest

=== Other in English ===
- William Butler Yeats, Mosada: A Dramatic Poem a short verse play in three scenes, published as a pamphlet of 100 copies paid for by his father (Yeats' first published work outside a journal), Irish poet published in the United Kingdom

== Works published in other languages ==
- François Coppée, Poemes et recits; France
- Naim Frashëri, Bagëti e bujqësia ("Shepherds and Farmers"), Albania
- Jens Peter Jacobsen, Digte og Udkast ("Poems and Sketches"), Denmark, published posthumously (died 1885)
- Guido Mazzoni, Nuove poesie, Italy
- Charles G. D. Roberts, In Divers Tones, Canada

== Births ==
Death years link to the corresponding "[year] in poetry" article:

- January 1 – Kinoshita Rigen 木下利玄, pen-name of Kinoshita Toshiharu (died 1925), Japanese, Meiji- and Taishō-period tanka poet
- January 3 – John Gould Fletcher (died 1950), American Imagist poet, winner of the Pulitzer Prize for Poetry
- February 2 – William Rose Benêt (died 1950), American poet, writer and editor; older brother of Stephen Vincent Benét
- February 11 – May Ziadeh (died 1941), Lebanese-Palestinian poet, essayist and translator
- February 13 – Ricardo Güiraldes (died 1927), Argentine gauchesque poet and author
- February 21 (February 9 O.S.) – Aleksei Kruchenykh (died 1968), Russian Futurist poet
- February 22 – Hugo Ball (died 1927), German poet and Dada artist
- March 30 – Frances Cornford (died 1960), English
- April 15 – Nikolay Gumilyov (executed 1921), Russian Acmeist poet
- May 7 – Gottfried Benn (died 1956), German essayist, novelist and expressionist poet
- May 15 – Helen Cruickshank (died 1975), Scottish
- May 16 – Vladislav Khodasevich (died 1939), Russian poet and critic
- May 20 – Chieko Takamura (died 1938), Japanese
- July – Misao Fujimura, 藤村操 (died 1903), Japanese philosophy student and poet, largely remembered for the poem he carves into a tree before committing suicide as a teenager over an unrequited love; the boy and the poem are sensationalized by Japanese newspapers after his death
- September 8 – Siegfried Sassoon (died 1967), English poet and author
- September 10 – H.D. (Hilda Doolittle), (died 1961) American poet
- September 20 – Charles Williams (died 1945), English writer and poet, and a member of the loose literary circle called the Inklings
- October 8 – Yoshii Isamu 吉井勇 (died 1960), Japanese, Taishō and Shōwa period tanka poet and playwright
- October 12 – Abd Al-Rahman Shokry (died 1958), Egyptian poet, member of the Divan school of poetry
- October 24 – Delmira Agustini (died 1914), Uruguayan
- October 30 – Zoë Rumbold Akins (died 1958), American playwright, poet and author
- November 1 – Sakutarō Hagiwara 萩原 朔太郎 (died 1942), Japanese, Taishō and early Shōwa period literary critic and free-verse poet called the "father of modern colloquial poetry in Japan"
- December 6 – Joyce Kilmer (died 1918 in action near Seringes, France), American journalist and poet whose best-known work is "Trees" (1913)

== Deaths ==
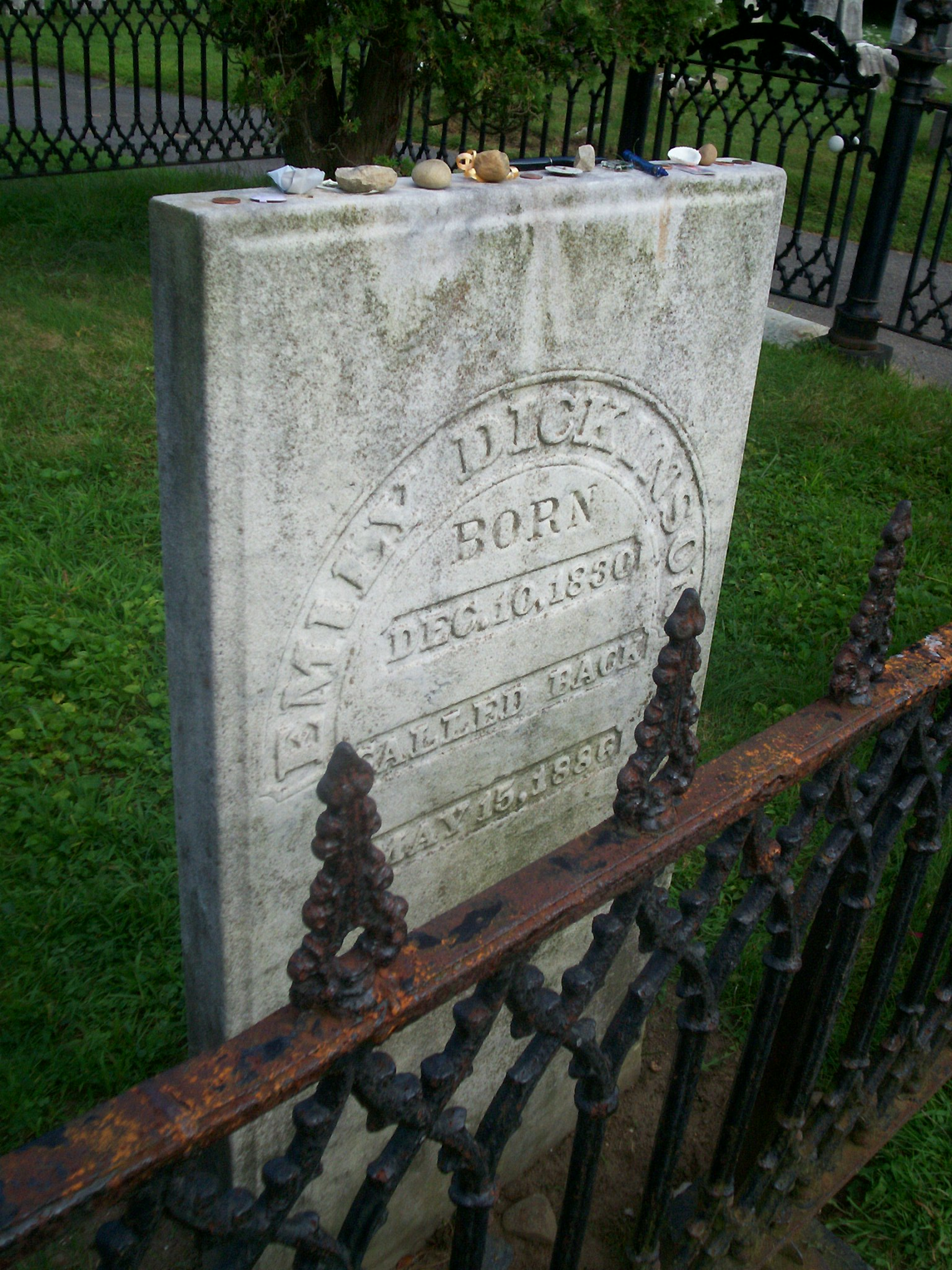
Emily Dickinson's tombstone in the family plot

Birth years link to the corresponding "[year] in poetry" article:

- February 26 – Narmadashankar Dave, also known as "Narmad" (born 1833), Indian, Gujarati-language poet
- March 27 – Sir Henry Taylor (born 1800), English dramatist, poet and public official
- April 15 – Abram Joseph Ryan, American poet, active proponent of the Confederate States of America, and a Roman Catholic priest called the "Poet-Priest of the Confederacy"
- July 6 – Paul Hamilton Hayne, 56, American poet, critic, and editor
- August 11 (July 30 O.S.) – Lydia Koidula, 42, Estonian poet
- October 7 – William Barnes, 86, English writer, poet, minister, and philologist
- October 21 – José Hernández, 51, Argentine poet
- December 10 – Emily Dickinson, 55, American poet

== See also ==
- 19th century in poetry
- 19th century in literature
- List of years in poetry
- List of years in literature
- Victorian literature
- French literature of the 19th century
- Symbolism (arts)
- Poetry
