= 1800 in poetry =

Nationality words link to articles with information on the nation's poetry or literature (for instance, Irish or France).

== Events ==
- January 10 – The Serampore Mission and Press is established in Serampore (now part of West Bengal) India by Baptist missionaries Joshua Marshman and William Ward. The press would grow into the largest in Asia, printing books in nearly every Indian language.
- October 3 – William and Dorothy Wordsworth, walking near Grasmere, encounter a leech gatherer who inspires his poem "Resolution and Independence", first written 18 months later and published in 1807.
- William Blake begins 3 years residence in a cottage at Felpham in Sussex to illustrate the works of William Hayley; here he begins work on his poem Milton.

== Works published ==
=== United Kingdom ===
- Christopher Anstey, Contentment; or, Hints to Servants on the Present Scarcity
- Robert Bloomfield, The Farmer's Boy, with engravings by Thomas Bewick; 15 editions by 1827
- Robert Burns, The Works of Robert Burns (posthumous)
- George Canning, editor, Poetry of the Anti-Jacobin, collection of poems which had appeared in the Anti-Jacobin magazine; four editions by 1801, London: J. Wright, anthology
- Joseph Cottle, Alfred
- William Gifford, Epistle to Peter Pindar, satire addressed to John Wolcot
- William Hayley, An Essay on Sculpture
- M. G. Lewis and others, Tales of Wonder, poems and fiction; includes "Glenfinlas" and other poems by Sir Walter Scott; published this year, although book states "1801"
- Thomas Moore, Odes of Anacreon
- William Sotheby:
  - The Georgics of Virgil
  - The Siege of Cuzco: A tragedy

=== United States ===
- William Cliffton, Poems, Chiefly Occasional, by the late Mr. Cliffton. To Which are Prefixed, Introductory Notices of the Life, Character and Writings, of the Author, and an Engraved Likeness, New York: Printed for J. W. Fenno, by G. & R. Waite, published posthumously

==== On the death of George Washington ====
- Richard Alsop, "A Poem, Sacred to the Memory of George Washington", dedicated to Martha Washington; among the most widely read of the many eulogies published in the United States on the death of Washington
- Charles Caldwell, An Elegiac Poem on the Death of General Washington
- John Blair Linn, The Death of Washington. A Poem. In Imitation of the Manner of Ossian. By Rev. John Blair Linn, Philadelphia: Printed by John Ormrod; a book-length poem criticized for treating Washington in the style of the Celtic poet
- Sacred Dirges, Hymns, and Anthems, Commemorative of the Death of General George Washington, The Guardian of His Country, and The Friend of Man. Born Feb. 22, 1732. Died, at Mount Vernon, Dec. 14, 1799. Aged 68. An Original Composition, including a poem by Susanna Haswell Rowson writing under the pseudonym "a citizen of Massachusetts", Boston: Printed at Boston, by I. Thomas and E. T. Andrews, anthology
- Hymns and Odes Composed on the Death of General George Washington, contributors include Thomas Paine, Charles Brockton Brown and Richard Alsop

== Works published in other languages ==
- Pritharam Dvija, translator, Svargarohan Parva, translation into Assamese from the original Sanskrit of the last canto of the Mahabharata; India
- Christian Adolf Overbeck, translator, Anakreon und Sappho, from the original Ancient Greek of Anacreon and Sappho; Lubeck: F. Bohn

== Births ==
Death years link to the corresponding "[year] in poetry" article:

- September 28 – Sibella Elizabeth Miles (died 1882), English poet, writer and schoolteacher
- October 14 – Charles Neaves (died 1876), Scottish judge and poet
- October 18 – Sir Henry Taylor (died 1884), English playwright, author and poet
- October 25
  - Maria Jane Jewsbury (died 1833), English writer and poet
  - Thomas Babington Macaulay (died 1859), English poet, historian and Whig politician of Scottish ancestry
- December 4 – Emil Aarestrup (died 1856), Danish
- Also:
  - c.1798–1800 – Charles Jeremiah Wells (died 1879), English
  - Asir Muzaffar Ali Khan (died 1861), Urdu-language Indian poet also writing in Persian and whose ghazals are compiled into six diwans
  - Godavardhana (died 1851), Kerala-born Indian poet writing many of his poems in Sanskrit
  - Mohammad Momin Khan, (died 1851), Indian, Urdu-language poet (surname: Momin)

== Deaths ==
Birth years link to the corresponding "[year] in poetry" article:

- February 23 – Joseph Warton (born 1722), English poet and critic
- April 25 – William Cowper, pronounced "Cooper" (born 1731), English poet and hymn writer
- June 29 – Abraham Gotthelf Kästner (born 1719), German
- September 29 – Michael Denis (born 1729), Austrian writer, poet, translator, librarian and zoologist
- December 26 – Mary Robinson (born 1757), English actress, poet, dramatist, novelist and royal mistress
- Also:
  - Arnimal (birth year not known), Indian, Kashmiri poet; a woman
  - Eibhlín Dubh Ní Chonaill (born 1743), Irish noblewoman and poet, composer of Caoineadh Airt Uí Laoghaire

== See also ==
- Poetry
- List of years in poetry
- 18th century in poetry
- 19th century in poetry
- List of years in literature
- 18th century in literature
- 19th century in literature
- Romantic poetry
- Golden Age of Russian Poetry (1800–1850)
- Weimar Classicism period in Germany, commonly considered to have begun in 1788 and to have ended either in 1805, with the death of Friedrich Schiller, or 1832, with the death of Goethe

== Notes ==
- "A Timeline of English Poetry" Web page of the Representative Poetry Online Web site, University of Toronto
