= Arnimal =

18th-century Kashmiri poet

- Born: 1737 CE; Palhalan, Kashmir (present-day Jammu and Kashmir, India)
- Known for: Vatsun and loal poetry

Arnimal (Kashmiri pronunciation: [ərʲnimaːl]) was an 18th-century Kashmiri Brahmin poet.

== Life ==
Arnimal was born in 1737 CE in the Palhalan near Pattan in northern Kashmir. At a young age, she was married to Munshi Bhawani Das Kachroo from Rainawari in Srinagar. Her husband grew to be a poet and an erudite Persian scholar in the court of Jumma Khan, the Afghan Governor of Kashmir between 1788 and 1792. An emotionally distant husband while living together, he later abandoned her and went to Kabul to join the Afghan royal court there.

== See also ==
- Habba Khatoon
- Lal Ded
