= Joe Rosenblatt =

Canadian poet (1933–2019)

Joseph Rosenblatt
- Born: December 26, 1933; Toronto, Ontario
- Died: March 11, 2019 (aged 85)
- Citizenship: Canadian
- Education: high school dropout
- Alma mater: Central Technical School
- Occupations: writer, artist
- Writing career
- Language: English
- Genres: poetry, fiction, drawing
- Notable works: Bumblebee Dithyramb, Top Soil, Poetry Hotel
- Notable awards: Governor General's Award, B.C. Book Prize

Joseph Rosenblatt (December 26, 1933 – March 11, 2019) was a Canadian poet who lived in Qualicum Beach, British Columbia. He won Canada's Governor-General's Award and British Columbia's B.C. Book Prize for poetry. He was also an artist, whose "line drawings, paintings, and sketches often illustrate his own and other poets' books of poetry."

== Life and writing ==
The son of Jewish immigrants from Poland, Rosenblatt was born and raised in Toronto, Ontario, where he grew up in the city's Kensington Market area and attended Lansdowne Public School. Later he went to Central Technical School, but dropped out and worked in a variety of blue-collar jobs. In 1956 he became a laborer for the Canadian Pacific Railway.

A socialist, he became a Trotskyist, joining the Socialist Education League in Toronto. He ran in the 1958 municipal election, for city council in Ward 1 (Riverdale), receiving 521 votes.

He began seriously writing poetry in the early 1960s. "He became interested in writing through his association with the worker poet Milton Acorn in the early sixties and the metaphysical poetry of Gwendolyn MacEwen." He "got his start with the help of other poets: Milton Acorn, Al Purdy and Earle Birney."

His first book, The L.S.D. Leacock, was published in 1966. In the same year he received a Canada Council grant that allowed him to quit his railway job and write full-time.

Since then, in his 40-year career, "Rosenblatt has written more than 20 books of poetry, several autobiographical works and his poems have appeared in over thirty anthologies of Canadian poetry.... He has traveled widely giving readings of his poems in Europe, Canada and the United States."

Books in Canada wrote of him in 1988 that, "street smart, water wise, heaven bent, Joe Rosenblatt is a talented man, fisher of gods, and a school in himself. He makes you feel things that are hard to touch: bee fur, tadpoles, and the human heart."

Rosenblatt summed up his philosophy of writing in this way:

I write to escape hyper reality – genocide of man, elephants and fish – the death of the ozone layer, the industrial degredation [sic] of the earth – My affordable opiate is my Muse. It allows me to float into a dream state and create an escapist literature. Let the prose-fanciers, the dog people as opposed to poetic feline fancier – indulge in grim reality. The very thought of reality gives me hives.

Rosenblatt died on March 11, 2019, shortly after advance reviews of his newest poetry collection Bite Me! Musings on Monsters and Mayhem began to appear in media.

== Recognition ==
A 1976 book of selected poems, Top Soil, won Rosenblatt the Governor General's Award in 1976.

A decade later, another book of selected poems, Poetry Hotel, won him the B.C. Book Prize for Poetry (now the Dorothy Livesay Poetry Prize) in 1986.

"Rosenblatt has been writer in residence at several Canadian universities, as well as the University of Rome and the University of Bologna." "Several bilingual volumes of his poetry have been published in Italian with translations by Prof. Alfredo Rizzardi of the University of Bologna, and Ada Donati of Rome" (one being a book of his sea sonnets, A Tentacled Mother). "His poems have also been ... translated into French, Dutch, Swedish, and Spanish."

== Publications ==
=== Poetry ===
- The LSD Leacock. Toronto: Coach House Press, 1966.
- Winter of the Luna Moth. House of Anansi, Toronto, 1968
- Bumblebee Dithyramb. Press Porcepic, Erin 1970
- Blind Photographer. Press Porcepic, Erin, 1974
- Dream Craters. Press Porcepic, Erin, 1975
- Virgins & Vampires. McClelland & Stewart, Toronto, 1975
- Top Soil, Selected Poems (1962–1975). Press Porcepic, Erin, 1976
- Loosely Tied Hands. Black Moss Press, Windsor, 1978
- The Sleeping Lady. Exile Editions, Toronto, 1980
- Brides of the Stream. Oolichan Books, Lantzville, B.C., 1983
- Poetry Hotel, Selected Poems (1963-1985). McClelland & Stewart, Toronto, 1985
- A Tentacled Mother. (in the original plus new sonnets) Exile Editions, Toronto, Oct. 1995
- The Rosenblatt Reader. (selected poems and prose, 1962–1995) Exile Editions, Toronto, 1995.
- The Voluptuous Gardener. (new poetry and selected drawings from Carleton University Art Gallery permanent collection) Beach Holme Press, Vancouver, 1996.
- Parrot fever. collages by Michel Christensen. Toronto: Exile Editions, 2002.
- The lunatic muse, Joe Rosenblatt; edited by David Berry. Toronto: Exile Editions, 2007.
- Dog, Joe Rosenblatt & Catherine Owen; photos by Karen Moe. Toronto: Mansfield Press, 2008.
- Bite Me! Musings on Monsters and Mayhem, The Porcupine's Quill, 2019.

=== Fiction ===
- Tommy Fry & the Ant Colony. Black Moss, Windsor, 1970
- Escape From the Glue Factory. (autobiographical fiction) Exile Editions, Toronto, 1985
- The Kissing Goldfish of Siam. (autobiographical fiction) Exile Editions, Toronto, 1989
- Beds & Consenting Dreamers. (an experimental novel) Oolichan Books, Lantzville, B.C. 1994

Except where noted, bibliographic information courtesy University of Toronto.

== See also ==
- Canadian literature
- Canadian poetry
- List of Canadian poets
