= 1889 in poetry =

This article covers 1889 in poetry Nationality words link to articles with information on the nation's poetry or literature (for instance, Irish or France).

== Events ==
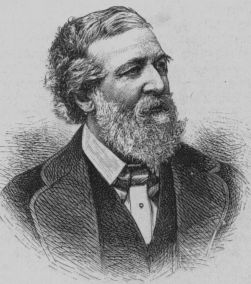
Robert Browning (died 1889)

- June 8 – English poet and Jesuit priest Gerard Manley Hopkins dies aged 54 in Dublin of typhoid; he is buried in Glasnevin Cemetery; most of his poetry remains unpublished until 1918.
- December 12 – English poet Robert Browning dies aged 77 at Ca' Rezzonico in Venice on the same day his book Asolando; Fancies and facts is published; he is buried in Poets' Corner in Westminster Abbey; Alfred, Lord Tennyson will be buried adjacently.

== Works published ==
=== Canada ===
- William Wilfred Campbell, Lake lyrics and other poems (Saint John: J.& A. McMillan)
- Arthur Wentworth Hamilton Eaton, Acadian Legends and Lyrics, Canada
- Sophia Almon Hensley, Poems.
- James McIntyre, Poems of James McIntyre.

Anthologies

- Songs of the Great Dominion: Voices from the Forests and Waters, the Settlements and Cities of Canada. (London [England]: Walter Scott). 500-page anthology of Canadian poetry.

=== United Kingdom ===
- Wilfrid Scawen Blunt, A New Pilgrimage, and Other Poems
- Robert Bridges, The Feast of Bacchus
- Thomas Edward Brown, The Manx Witch, and Other Poems
- Robert Browning, Asolando; Fancies and facts
- Amy Levy, A London Plane–Tree, and Other Verse
- Walter Pater, Appreciations: With an Essay on Style, criticism
- Emily Pfeiffer, Flowers of the Night
- Algernon Charles Swinburne, Poems and Ballads, Third Series (see also First Series 1866; Second Series 1878)
- Arthur Symons, Days and Nights
- Alfred Lord Tennyson:
  - Demeter and Other Poems
  - He writes "Crossing the Bar" in October as he crosses the Solent
  - Idylls of the King, complete edition of the Idylls, with final titles (see also Idylls of the King 1859, The Holy Grail 1869, Idylls of the King 1870, "The Last Tournament" 1871, Gareth and Lynette 1872, "Balin and Balan" in Tiresias 1885)
- W. B. Yeats, The Wanderings of Oisin and Other Poems, including "The Wanderings of Oisin", "The Song of the Happy Shepherd", "The Stolen Child", "Down By The Salley Gardens" (Kegan Paul, Trench & Company), Irish poet published in the United Kingdom

=== United States ===
- Eugene Field, A Little Book of Western Verse, including "Little Boy Blue" and "Wynkyn, Blynkyn and Nod", United States
- Louise Chandler Moulton, Poems
- Walt Whitman, Leaves of Grass, eighth edition

=== Other ===
- Giosuè Carducci, Barbarian Odes, Book 3, Italy
- Holger Drachmann, Sangenes Bog ("Book of Songs"), Denmark
- Herman Gorter, Mei ("May"), Netherlands
- Banjo Paterson, "Clancy of the Overflow", Australia
- Luigi Pirandello, Mal giocondo ("Playful Evil" or "Joyful Pain"), Italy
- Govardhanram N. Tripathi, Lilavatijivankala, a tribute to his dead daughter, Indian, writing in Gujarati
- Verner von Heidenstam, Vallfart och vandringsår ("Pilgrimage: the Wandering Years"), Sweden
- W. B. Yeats, The Wanderings of Oisin and Other Poems, including "The Wanderings of Oisin", "The Song of the Happy Shepherd", "The Stolen Child", "Down By The Salley Gardens" (Kegan Paul, Trench & Company) Irish poet published in the United Kingdom

== Births ==
Death years link to the corresponding "[year] in poetry" article:

- February 3 (January 22 O.S.) – Artur Adson (died 1977), Estonian poet and critic
- February 11 – Acharya Ramlochan Saran (died 1971), Indian, Maithili-language poet littérateur, grammarian, publisher and poet
- March 1 – Okamoto Kanoko, 岡本かの子, pen name of Ohnuki Kano (died 1939), Japanese, author, tanka poet, and Buddhist scholar in the Taishō and early Shōwa periods; mother of artist Tarō Okamoto
- April 27 – Arnulf Øverland (died 1968), Norwegian
- June 23
  - Anna Andreyevna Akhmatova (died 1966), Russian
  - Rofū Miki, 三木 露風, pen name of Masao Miki (died 1964), Japanese Symbolist poet and writer
- June 28 – Abbas Al Akkad عباس محمود العقاد (died 1964), Egyptian, Arabic-language writer and poet, a founder of the Divan school of poetry
- July 30 – Dorothy Wellesley, born Dorothy Violet Ashton and styled Lady Gerald Wellesley between 1914 and 1943 (died 1956), English socialite, author, poet and literary editor
- August 5 – Conrad Aiken (died 1973), American writer
- August 19 – Arthur Waley (died 1966), English Orientalist
- August 29 – (Doris) Capel Boake (died 1944), Australian writer
- September 13 – Pierre Reverdy (died 1960), French
- September 15 – Claude McKay (died 1948), Jamaican-born writer and poet of the Harlem Renaissance
- September 17 – Katka Zupančič (died 1967), Slovene children's poet
- September 29 – Matilde Hidalgo (died 1974), Ecuadorian physician, poet and women's rights activist
- October 31 – Napoleon Lapathiotis (died 1944), Greek
- November 11 – Mantarō Kubota, 久保田万太郎 (died 1963), Japanese author, playwright and poet (surname: Kubota)
- December 8 – Hervey Allen (died 1949), American writer
- December 24 – Patrick MacGill (died 1963), Irish-born "navvy poet" and journalist
- Also:
  - Harley Matthews (died 1968), Australian
  - John Munro (Iain Rothach; killed in action 1918), Scottish Gaelic
  - V. C. Balakrishna Panikker (died 1915), Indian, Malayalam-language poet
  - Vasilis Rotas (died 1977), Greek
  - Fredegond Shove, née Maitland (died 1949), English

== Deaths ==
Birth years link to the corresponding "[year] in poetry" article:

- March 25 – Cornelius Mathews, 71 (born 1817), American poet
- May 31 – Horatius Bonar, 80 (born 1808), Scottish hymnodist
- June 8 – Gerard Manley Hopkins, 44 (born 1844), English poet, in Ireland
- June 15 – Mihai Eminescu, 39 (born 1850), Romanian poet
- September 10 – Amy Levy, 27 (born 1861), English poet and novelist, by suicide
- September 18 – John Barr, 79 (born 1809), Scottish-born New Zealand poet
- September 23 – Eliza Cook, 70 (born 1818), English poet
- October 25 – Émile Augier, 69 (born 1820), French dramatist and poet
- November 18 – William Allingham, 65 (born 1824) Irish-born poet
- November 29 – Martin Farquhar Tupper, 79 (born 1810), English writer and poet
- December 10 – Ludwig Anzengruber, 50 (born 1839), Austrian dramatist, novelist and poet
- December 12 – Robert Browning, 77 (born 1812), English poet, in Italy
- December 23 – Constance Naden, 31 (born 1858), English poet and philosopher, of infection

== See also ==
- 19th century in poetry
- 19th century in literature
- List of years in poetry
- List of years in literature
- Victorian literature
- French literature of the 19th century
- Symbolist poetry
- Poetry
