= Keith Donohue (novelist) =

American novelist (born 1959)

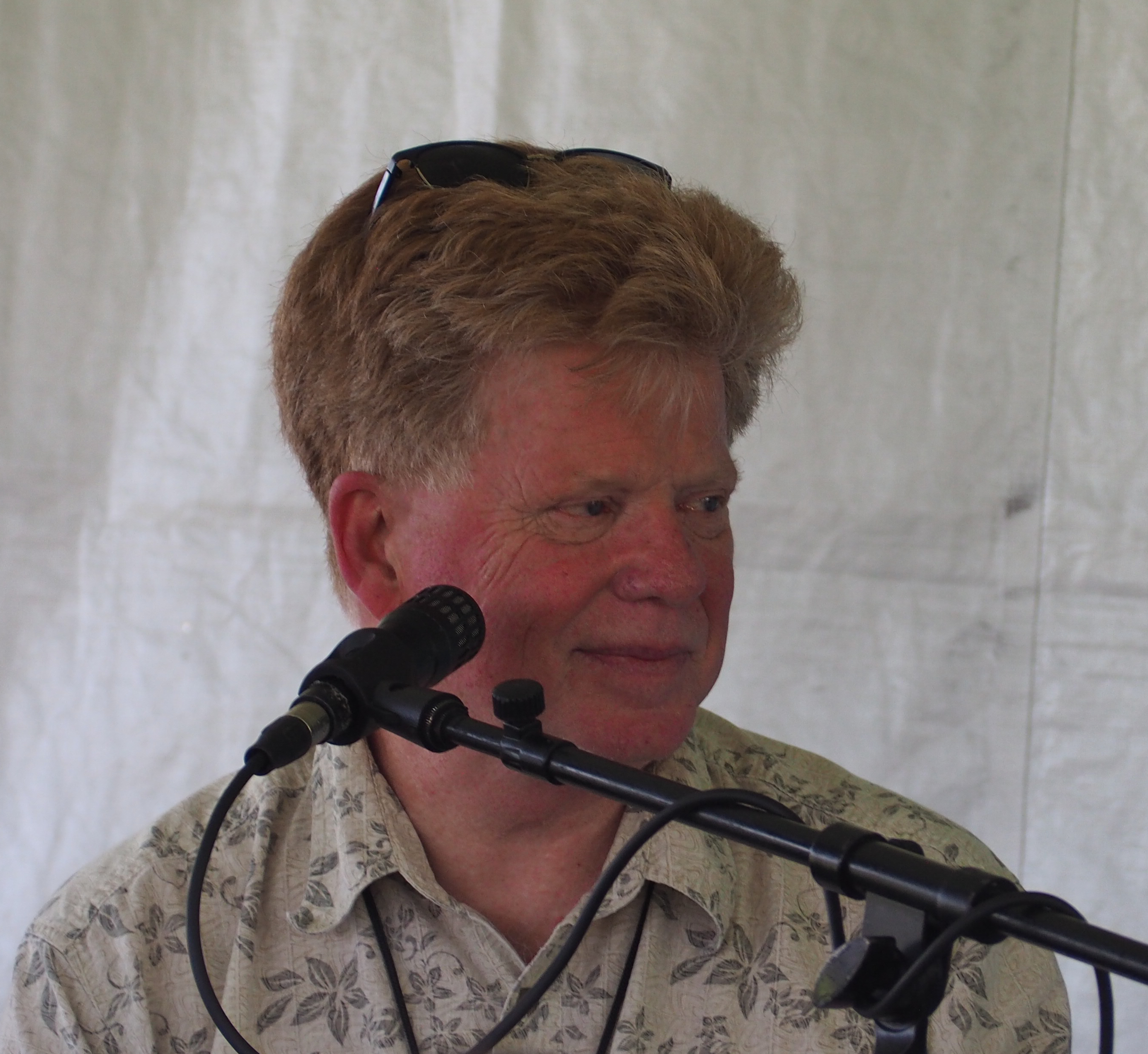
- Born: 1959 (age 66–67); Pittsburgh, Pennsylvania, U.S.
- Education: Duquesne University (BA, MA); Catholic University of America (PhD)
- Occupations: Speechwriter; novelist; construction worker; cigar store manager; box office clerk; bureaucrat
- Writing career
- Genres: novel, short story
- Literary movement: magical realism

Keith Donohue (born 1959) is an American novelist. He is the author of six novels: The Girl in the Bog (2024), The Motion of Puppets (2016), The Boy Who Drew Monsters (2014), Centuries of June (2011), Angels of Destruction (2009), and The Stolen Child (2006). His acclaimed 2006 novel The Stolen Child, about a changeling, was inspired by the Yeats poem of the same name.

== Background ==
Born and raised in Pittsburgh, Pennsylvania, he earned his B.A. and M.A. from Duquesne University and his Ph.D. in English from the Catholic University of America.

Until 1998 he worked at the National Endowment for the Arts and wrote speeches for chairman Jane Alexander, and is currently director of communications for the National Historical Publications and Records Commission, the grant-making arm of the US National Archives in Washington, DC.

He has also written book reviews for the Washington Post.

== Works ==
- Centuries of June. New York: Crown Publishers. 2011. ISBN 978-0-307-45028-9.
- Angels of Destruction. New York: Shaye Areheart Books. 2009. ISBN 978-0-307-45025-8.
- The Stolen Child. New York: Nan A. Talese. 2006. ISBN 0-385-51616-9.
- The Irish Anatomist: A Study of Flann O'Brien. Bethesda: Maunsel Press. 2002. ISBN 1-930901-35-6.
- The Boy Who Drew Monsters. New York: Picador. 2014. ISBN 978-1-250-05715-0.
- The Motion of Puppets. New York: Picador. 2016. ISBN 978-1-250-05718-1.

== Sources ==
Contemporary Authors Online. The Gale Group, 2007. PEN (Permanent Entry Number): 0000169243.
