= The Wanderings of Oisin =

1889 epic poem by William Butler Yeats

- Author: William Butler Yeats
- Language: English
- Genre: Epic poetry Narrative poetry
- Publication date: 1889
- Followed by: The Song of the Happy Shepherd

The Wanderings of Oisin (/oʊˈʃiːn/ oh-SHEEN) is an epic poem published by William Butler Yeats in 1889 in the book The Wanderings of Oisin and Other Poems. It was his first publication outside magazines, and immediately won him a reputation as a significant poet. (Note: Matthew Russell reviewed the poem in the Irish Monthly (February 1889), stating "Ireland can boast of another true poet in William Yeats"; quoted in a later Irish Monthly (March 1953) article by Roger McHugh.) This narrative poem takes the form of a dialogue between the aged Irish hero Oisín and St. Patrick, the man traditionally responsible for converting Ireland to Christianity. Most of the poem is spoken by Oisin, relating his 300-year sojourn in the isles of Faerie. The poem was not popular among modernist critics like T. S. Eliot. However, Harold Bloom defended this poem in his book-length study of Yeats, and concludes that it deserves reconsideration.

== Story ==
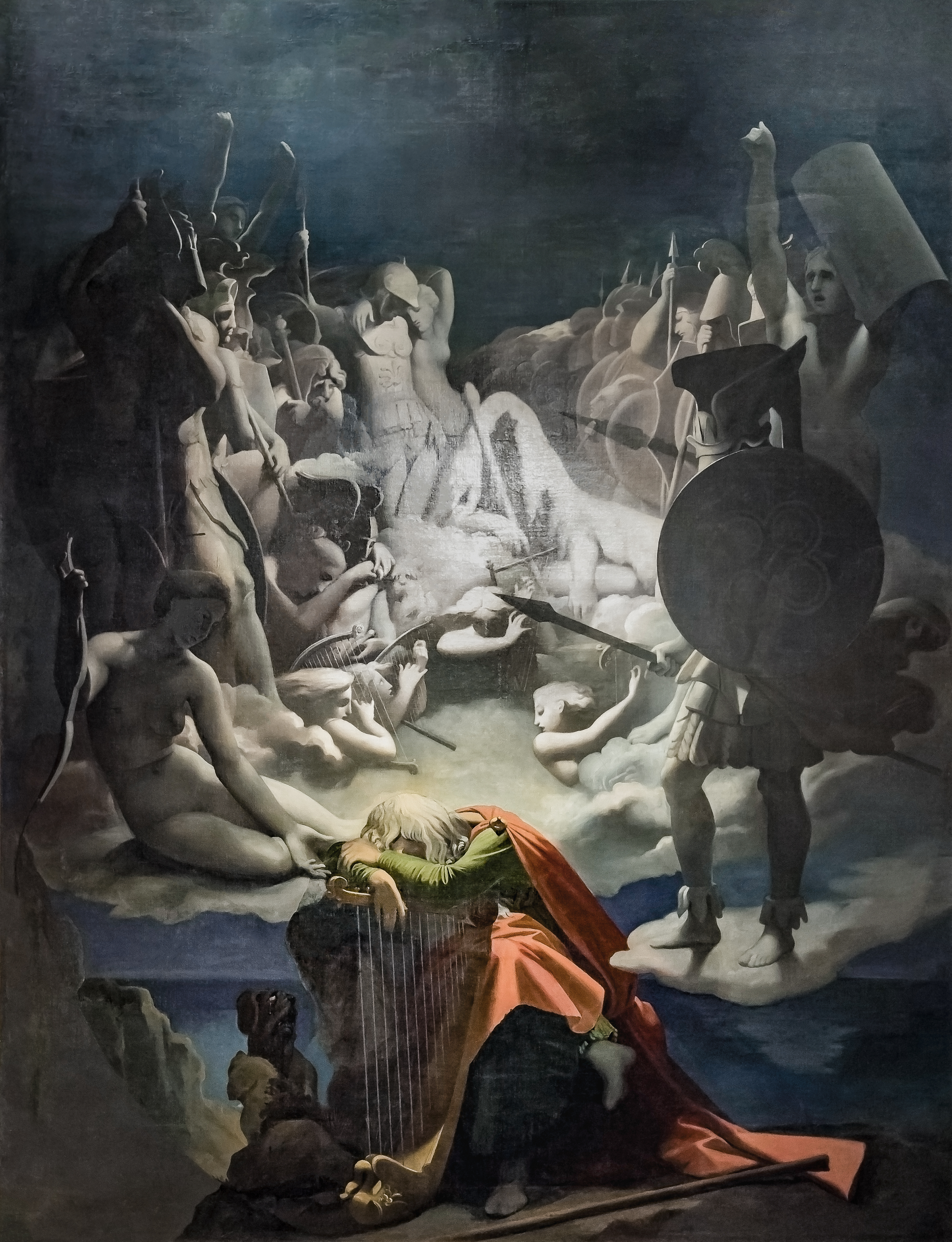
Ossian's Dream by Jean Ingres

The fairy princess Niamh fell in love with Oisin's poetry and begged him to join her in the immortal islands. For a hundred years he lived as one of the Sidhe, hunting, dancing, and feasting. At the end of this time he found a spear washed up on the shore and grew sad, remembering his times with the Fianna. Niamh took him away to another island, where the ancient and abandoned castle of the sea-god Manannan stood. Here they found another woman held captive by a demon, whom Oisin battled again and again for a hundred years, until it was finally defeated. They then went to an island where ancient giants who had grown tired of the world long ago were sleeping until its end, and Niamh and Oisin slept and dreamt with them for a hundred years. Oisin then desired to return to Ireland to see his comrades. Niamh lent him her horse warning him that he must not touch the ground, or he would never return. Back in Ireland, Oisin, still a young man, found his warrior companions dead, and the pagan faith of Ireland displaced by Patrick's Christianity. He then saw two men struggling to carry a "sack full of sand"; he bent down to lift it with one hand and hurl it away for them, but his saddle girth broke and he fell to the ground, becoming three hundred years old instantaneously.

== Structure ==
The poem is told in three parts, with the verse becoming more complex with each: the lines run four (iambic tetrameter), five (iambic pentameter), and six (anapaestic hexameter) metrical feet respectively. The three "books" begin thus:

Book I:

You who are bent, and bald, and blind,
With a heavy heart and a wandering mind,
Have known three centuries, poets sing,
Of dalliance with a demon thing.

Book II:

Now, man of the croziers, shadows called our names
And then away, away, like whirling flames;
And now fled by, mist-covered, without sound,
The youth and lady and the deer and hound

Book III:

Fled foam underneath us, and round us, a wandering and milky smoke,
High as the saddle-girth, covering away from our glances the tide;
And those that fled, and that followed, from the foam-pale distance broke;
The immortal desire of Immortals we saw in their faces, and sighed.

== Publication history ==
The poem was first published in Yeats's 1889 volume The Wanderings of Oisin and Other Poems. In that book, it is printed first and occupies one third of the printed pages. It was republished in a revised form in his Poems (1899), where it was placed last. Later the poem was printed anew in his Early Poems and Stories (1925). Warwick Gould writes that in this volume, the poem was given "pride of place" in accordance with Yeats's assessment "my subject-matter became Irish" with this poem.

== See also ==
- List of works by William Butler Yeats
