= The Stolen Child =

1889 poem by W. B. Yeats

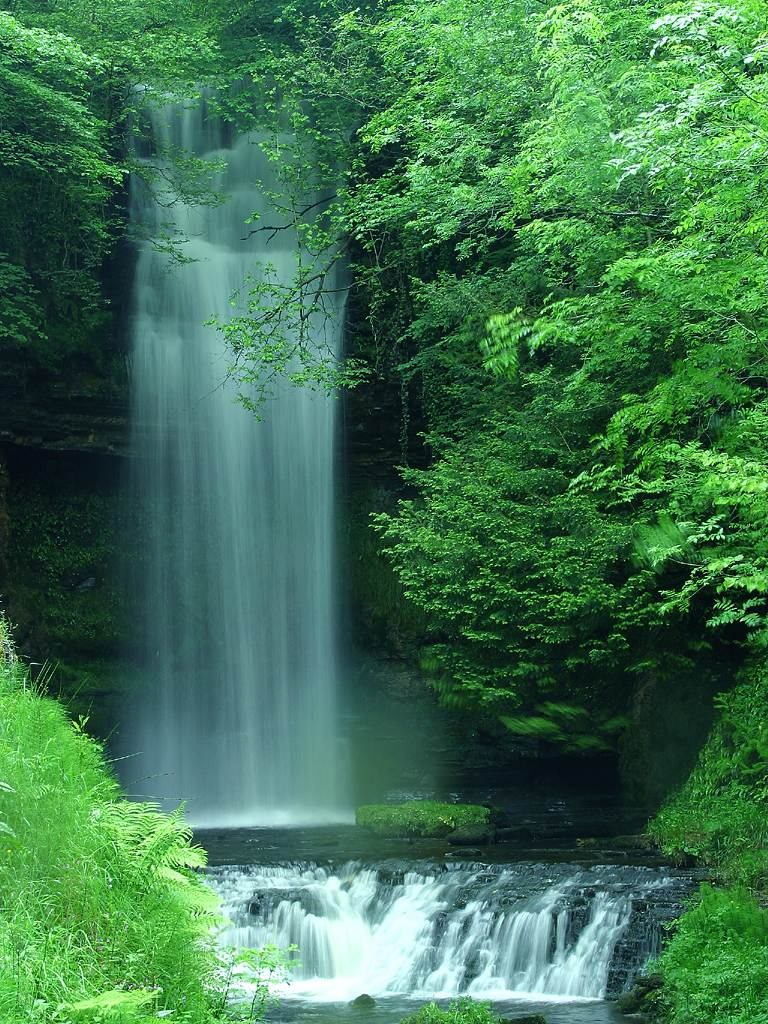
Glencar Waterfall in County Leitrim, mentioned in the poem

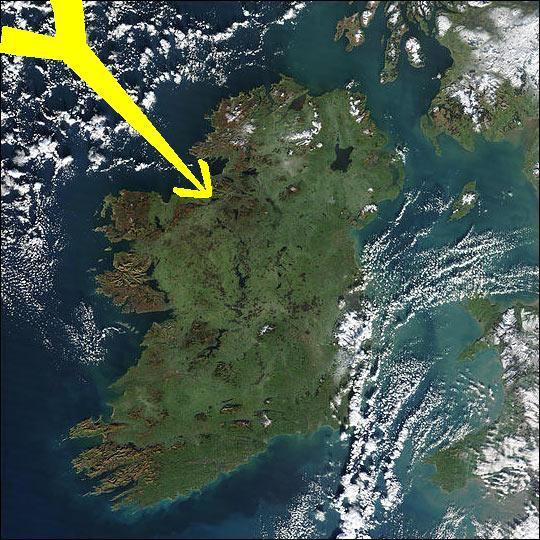
Location of the waterfall mentioned in the poem, nestling in the Emerald Isle

"The Stolen Child" is an 1889 poem by William Butler Yeats, published in The Wanderings of Oisin and Other Poems.

== Overview ==
The poem was written in 1886 and is considered to be one of Yeats's more notable early poems. The poem is based on Irish legend and concerns faeries beguiling a child to come away with them. Yeats had a great interest in Irish mythology about faeries resulting in his publication of Fairy and Folk Tales of the Irish Peasantry in 1888 and Fairy Folk Tales of Ireland in 1892.

The poem reflects the early influence of Romantic literature and Pre-Raphaelite verse.

== Refrain ==
Come away, O human child!
To the waters and the wild
With a faery, hand in hand,
For the world's more full of weeping than you can understand.

== Publication history ==
The poem was first published in the Irish Monthly in December 1886. The poem was then published in a compilation of work by several Irish poets Poems and Ballads of Young Ireland in 1888 with several critics praising the poem. It was later published in his first book of poetry The Wanderings of Oisin and Other Poems as well as Fairy and Folk Tales of the Irish Peasantry.

== Musical adaptations ==
The poem was first set to music as his Op.38 by the English composer Cyril Rootham, originally for SATB voices and piano (1911) and then for SATB chorus and small orchestra (1912). The poem was also set to music and recorded by Loreena McKennitt on her 1985 debut album Elemental and again on Nights from the Alhambra (2006). Subsequently, additional musical versions were recorded by the folk rock group The Waterboys (appearing on their 1988 album Fisherman's Blues, with portions of the poem spoken by Tomás Mac Eoin), Heather Alexander on her 1994 album Wanderlust and Hamilton Camp in the song "Celts" on his 2005 album Sweet Joy. Another version set to music was included as a bonus track on the Danny Ellis album 800 Voices. The poem was also set to music and recorded by Kate Price on her 1993 album The Time Between.

In 2012, Merrymouth, a folk band led by Simon Fowler of Ocean Colour Scene, recorded the poem set to a melody written by Fowler and music by Merrymouth (Fowler, Sealey, McNamara) for their debut album Simon Fowler's Merrymouth. American composer Eric Whitacre has also set this poem in a piece for The King's Singers and the National Youth Choir of Great Britain. British composer and guitar virtuoso Steve Hackett recorded a version of Yeats' poem under the title "Waters of the Wild" on his 2006 album Wild Orchids.

The poem has also been set to music by Norwegian composer Marcus Paus, and was included on the Grammy-nominated album Kind (2010) by Ensemble 96; Stephen Eddins wrote that Paus's work is "sumptuously lyrical and magically wild, and [...] beautifully captures the alluring mystery and danger and melancholy" of Yeats. Kirk McElhearn wrote that "it presents a sound-world that is astounding and moving".

== In modern culture ==
Keith Donohue's novel The Stolen Child was inspired by the poem. The refrain is prominently featured in Steven Spielberg's film A.I. Artificial Intelligence.

The refrain is spoken during the opening credits of the 2014 film Song of the Sea, which is based largely on Celtic mythology. The 2020 film Come Away also features the poem.

== See also ==
- 1889 in poetry
- List of works by William Butler Yeats

== Literature ==
- R. F. Foster, W. B. Yeats: a Life, Oxford University Press 1998 ISBN 0-19-288085-3 pages 56, 75-76
- Richard J Finneran (ed) Yeats: An Annual of Critical and Textual Studies XII, 1994 ISBN 0-472-10614-7 pages 91–92
- Michael Bell, Literature, Modernism and Myth: Belief and Responsibility in the Twentieth Centuries ISBN 0-521-58016-1 pages 44–59
- David Ben-Merre, Falling into Silence: Giorgio Agamben at the End of the PoemMOSAIC 2012 ISSN 1925-5683 pages 89–104
- Terence Brown, The Life of W.B. Yeats Blackwell Publishing 2001 ISBN 0-631-22851-9 pages 9, 19, 66
- William A. Dumbletone, Ireland: Life and Land in Literature SUNY Press 1994 ISBN 0-87395-783-0 Pages 93–95, 129, 135-138
