= Harriet Guest =

Academics of the University of York

Harriet C. Guest is professor emerita of English at the University of York. She received her PhD from the University of Cambridge.

Guest married John Barrell, also of the University of York, in London in 1992.

== Selected publications ==
- A form of sound words: The religious poetry of Christopher Smart. Clarendon Press, Oxford, 1989.
- Small change: Women, learning, patriotism, 1750-1810. University of Chicago Press, Chicago, 2000.
- Empire, barbarism and civilisation: William Hodges, James Cook and the return to the Pacific. Cambridge University Press, 2007.
- Unbounded attachment: Sentiment and politics in the age of the French Revolution. Oxford University Press, Oxford, 2013.
