= Annie Vitelli =

New Zealand singer, entertainer

Annie Vitelli (née Day, born Shoreditch, London, England; 1837 (baptised 7 May 1837) – died Moonee Ponds, Victoria, 18 June 1917) was a New Zealand singer and entertainer. Her stage name was Lydia Howarde.

== Life ==
Annie Day was the daughter of a Melbourne merchant, Francis John Day, and his wife, Margaret Tilley.

Vitelli studied music in Melbourne, Australia, where around 1855 she married her teacher, Giovanni Whittle Vitelli (d. 1859). Following her husband's death Annie eloped and married and the singer Charles Robert Thatcher in February 1861 at the St. James' Anglican Church, Geelong, they had two daughters; Annie Matilda (b. Christchurch 28 July 1862), and Charlotte (b. Wellington 5 September 1864).

Vitelli was active as a professional singer from 1859 until 1882, and toured between New Zealand (1862–63, 1863–65 and 1869–70) and Australia with her second spouse, performing in venues from hotels to bars on the gold fields. While she performed sentimental ballads, her spouse performed satire songs. Vitelli and her husband were regarded highly. In the 1870s Vitelli took on the stage name Lydia Howarde opera bouffe and burlesque prima donna.

Vitelli retired in 1882 and worked as a music teacher in Australia.
