= Charles Robert Thatcher =

New Zealand singer, entertainer, songwriter

- Born: 1830; Bristol, England
- Died: 1878 (aged 47–48)
- Occupations: Singer, entertainer and songwriter
- Writing career
- Language: English
- Years active: 1857-1878

Charles Robert Thatcher (1830–1878) was a notable New Zealand singer, entertainer and songwriter.

He was born in Bristol, England in 1830. He was married to singer Annie Vitelli.

== Life ==
In his early twenties Thatcher emigrated to Australia. Arriving in Melbourne on the Isabella in November 1852, he first tried his hand at goldmining but soon joined the orchestra at the Royal Victoria Theatre, Bendigo. He began filling in between the plays by singing topical verses to well-known tunes in his pleasant tenor voice. After this engagement Thatcher's reputation as a goldfields balladeer proceeded apace and by May 1854 he was given top billing at the Shamrock Hotel at Bendigo, which remained his base for several years. He travelled around all the principal goldfields of Victoria and also undertook three tours of New Zealand.

== Bibliography ==
- Thatcher's Colonial Songster (1857)
- Thatcher's Colonial Minstrel (1859)
- The Victoria Songster (1860)
- Thatcher's Colonial Minstrel: new collection of songs (1864)
