= Jean-Louis Vallas =

French poet

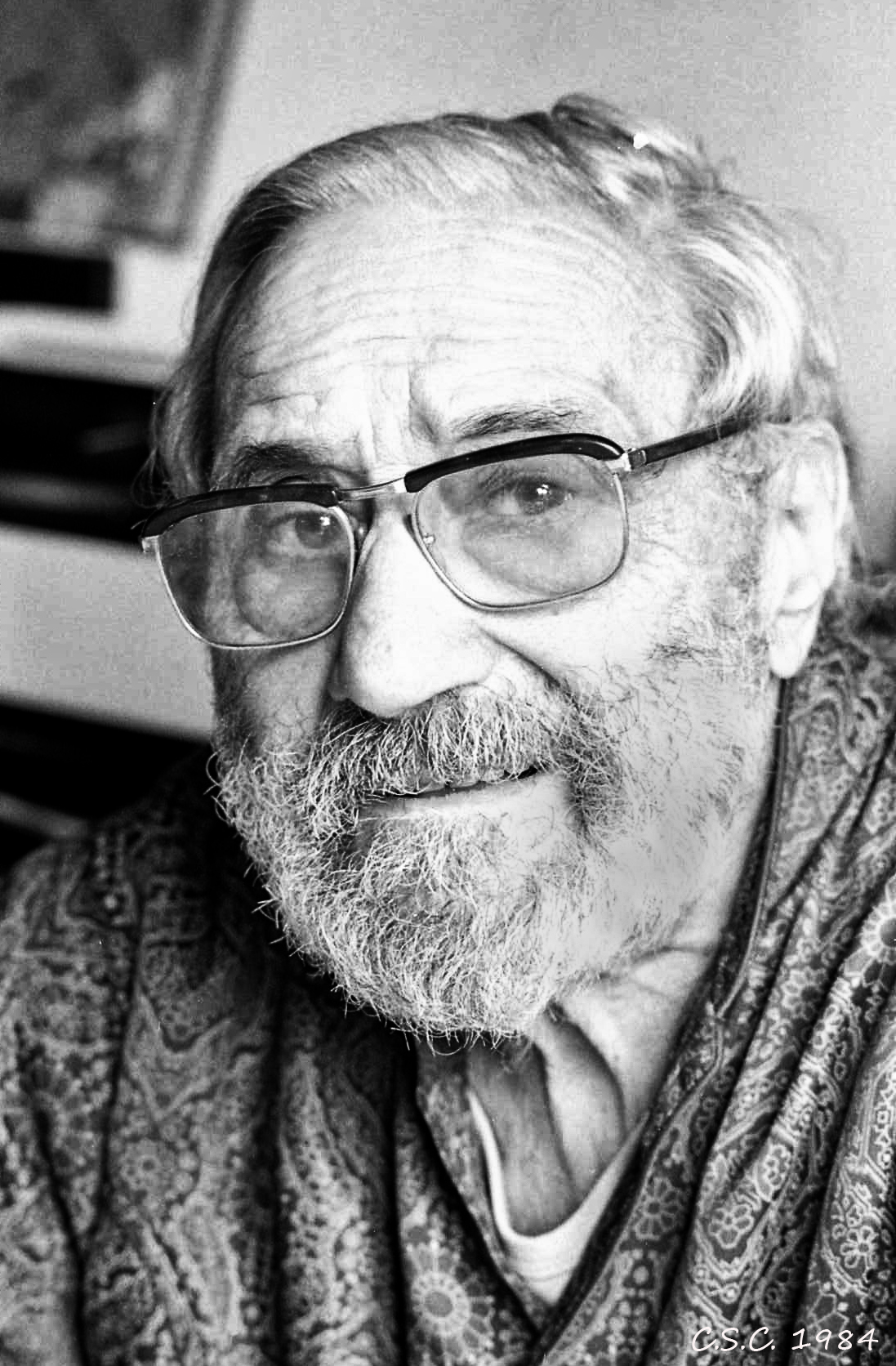
Loyis Andre Jean portrait

Louis Andre Jean "Jean-Louis" Vallas (2 June 1901 – 17 November 1995) was a French poet.
