= Einar Skjæraasen =

Norwegian author and poet (1900–1966)

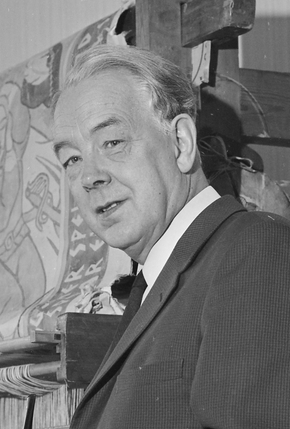
Einar Skjæraasen in 1965

Einar Skjæraasen (23 July 1900 – 18 March 1966) was a Norwegian author and poet, a longtime resident of Trysil Municipality.

He was a parliamentary ballot candidate for the Liberal Party from the constituency Oslo in 1957.

== Bibliography ==
- Reflekser (1936)
- Skritt forbi min dør (1938)
- Den underlige våren (1941)
- Så stiger sevjene (1945)
- Danse mi vise, gråte min sang (1949)
- Du ska itte trø i graset (1954)
- Sju undringens mil (Utvalgte dikt 1963)
- Sang i September (1965)
- Bumerke Etterlatte dikt (1966)

== Awards ==
- Mads Wiel Nygaards Endowment in 1965
