= Margaret Curran (poet) =

Australian writer

Margaret Curran (1887–1962) was an Australian poet, editor, and journalist.

== Biography ==
Born in Colinton near Esk, Queensland, Curran was educated at the Ipswich Convent. She published several poems in Queensland literary journal The Muses' Magazine in the 1920s. She worked as a journalist and editor for the Queensland magazine The Steering Wheel and Society and Home, was a sub-editor for the Toowoomba Chronicle. The Oxford Literary Guide to Australia identified Cullen as an "author of verse, short stories and serials", and as an editor of Country Woman and Producer's Review, the position that she held until her retirement. She was President of the Ladies Literary Society in Toowoomba from 1933 to 1963. In this capacity she organised various events including regular pilgrimages to pay tribute to writer Arthur Hoey Davis, known as Steele Rudd. Curran was a descendant of nineteenth-century Scottish poet Janet Hamilton.

== Works ==
- The wind blows high and low, and other verses, Brisbane: Carter-Watson Co., 1928

== Honors ==
There is a plaque dedicated to her at Toowoomba City Library, Toowoomba, Queensland.
