= Jessie Wilson Manning =

American author and lecturer

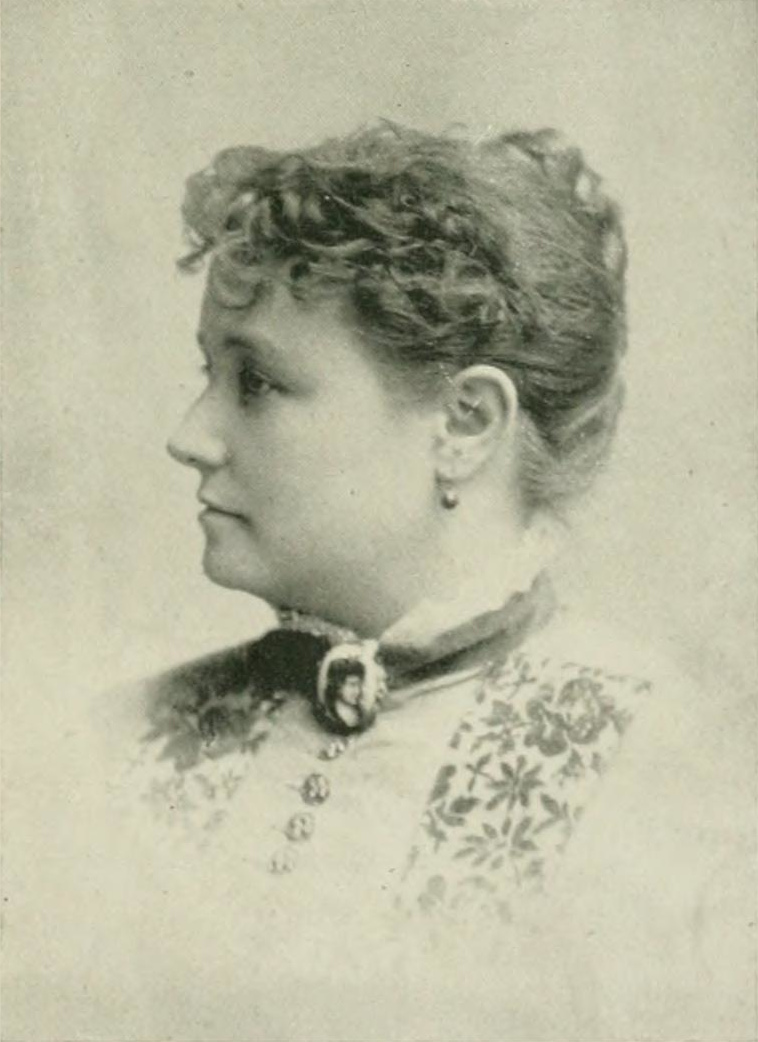
- Photo in A Woman of the Century
- Born: Jessie Wilson; October 26, 1855; Mount Pleasant, Iowa, U.S.
- Died: August 30, 1947 (aged 91); Chariton, Iowa, U.S.
- Education: Iowa Wesleyan University
- Occupations: Author, lecturer
- Spouse: Eli Manning (m. 1889)
- Writing career
- Notable work: The passion of life

Jessie Wilson Manning (née, Wilson; October 26, 1855 – August 30, 1947) was an American author and lecturer from Iowa. After graduating from Iowa Wesleyan University, she spent five years as a speaker on literary and temperance topics. Manning was the author of the book The Passion of Life and contributed numerous articles, poems, and essays to the Iowa press and various magazines. Her Chariton, Iowa home served as a social and literary center.

== Biography ==
Jessie Wilson was born in Mount Pleasant, Iowa, October 26, 1855. She spent her childhood and received her education in Mount Pleasant. She graduated from the Iowa Wesleyan University, in 1874.

Manning entered the held of platform work immediately after graduation, and was for five years a speaker on literary subjects and for the cause of temperance. In the fall of 1889, she married Eli Manning, of Chariton, Iowa, prominent in business and political circles in that State. Since her marriage, Manning devoted herself to her home and family of three sons. Her first book, published in 1887, titled Passion of Life, was her most ambitious work and achieved a moderate success. She wrote a large number of articles for the Iowa press, among them a series of literary criticism, and poems, and essays for magazines, besides stories under a pen-name. (Note: Willard & Livermore (1893) state that some of Jessie's writings were under a pen name, but the pen name itself is not divulged.)

Her Chariton home was a social and literary center.

Jessie Wilson Manning died August 30, 1947, at Chariton, Iowa.

== Selected works ==
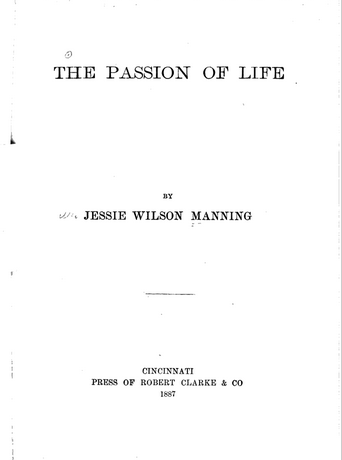
The Passion of Life, 1867

- The Passion of Life, 1867
