= The Wanderings of Oisin and Other Poems =

1889 collection of poems by W. B. Yeats

The Wanderings of Oisin and Other Poems was the first collection of poems by W. B. Yeats. It was published in 1889.

In addition to the title poem, the last epic-scale poem that Yeats ever wrote, the book includes a number of short poems that Yeats would later collect under the title Crossways in his Collected Poems.

== Contents ==
- The Wanderings of Oisin
- The Song of the Happy Shepherd
- The Sad Shepherd
- The Cloak, the Boat, and the Shoes
- Anashuya and Vijaya
- The Indian upon God
- The Indian to His Love
- The Falling of the Leaves
- Ephemera
- The Madness of King Goll
- The Stolen Child
- To an Isle in the Water
- Down by the Salley Gardens
- The Meditation of the Old Fisherman
- The Ballad of Father O'Hart
- The Ballad of Moll Magee
- The Ballad of the Foxhunter

== See also ==
- List of works by William Butler Yeats
