= The Song of the Happy Shepherd =

1889 poem by William Butler Yeats

"The Song of the Happy Shepherd" is a poem by William Butler Yeats.

It was first published under this title in his first book, The Wanderings of Oisin and Other Poems, but in fact the same poem had appeared twice before: as an epilogue to Yeats' poem The Isle of Statues, and again as an epilogue to his verse play Mosada. On the first of these occasions, the poem was said to be spoken by a satyr carrying a conch shell.

In the poem, the shepherd mourns the death of the old pastoral world and rejects modern science and materialism, arguing instead that "Words alone are certain good". However, the shepherd's own arguments cast doubt on his viewpoint. He describes a shell (representing poetry) as offering only brief comfort and "guile". He also announces a plan to revive a faun with his singing, but compares his own plan to a dream.

== See also ==
- 1889 in poetry
- List of works by William Butler Yeats
