= The Passion of Life =

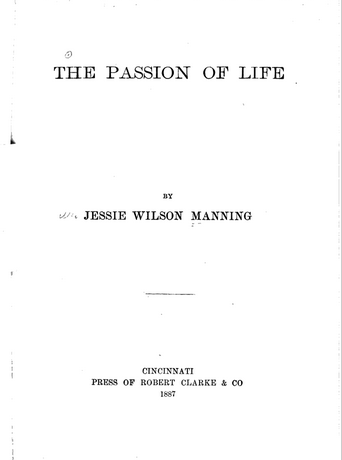
First edition frontispiece

The Passion of Life was a 19th-century American book of poetry by Jessie Wilson Manning. Published in 1887 by Robert Clarke & Company, Cincinnati, Ohio, the 75 page printed volume, written in Chariton, Iowa, was dedicated to Manning's mother, Mrs. Adeline Hensham Wilson. The work was a poem in five parts: I. "The Glamour of Youth"; II. "Song of the Soul"; III. "Lost Love"; IV. "May glides Onward into June "; V. "The Doubter ".

== Plot ==
The Passion of Life is the story of two lives, in their separate attraction and repulsion, told in smooth verse. The reader picks out the story from the poems, and has no great fault to find with it as a study of self-restraint. It is when he comes to inquire into the poetry of the thing that he begins at once to doubt.

== Critical reception ==
According to the Masonic Voice Review (1887), the work was a well-woven story on the topics of heart and love; constancy and faith; as well as waiting and reward. While it pursued a somewhat "beaten path", it was written with grace in a "weird", attractive tone, and chaste rhythm. The author was constant to her purpose, and accomplished her task with well-sustained strength and beauty. The National Republican (1891) said that it was "A high attamment, a triumph of art. A poem in five parts, ... interesting and true throughout, often deeply thoughtful, often eloquent, ever sweet, tender, pure and beautiful, . . . showing the extraordinary power of the poet, and must introduce her favorably to exalted souls."
