= John Barrell =

British scholar

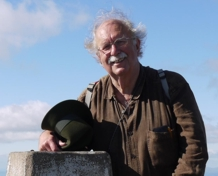
John Barrell on Cader Idris, Wales.

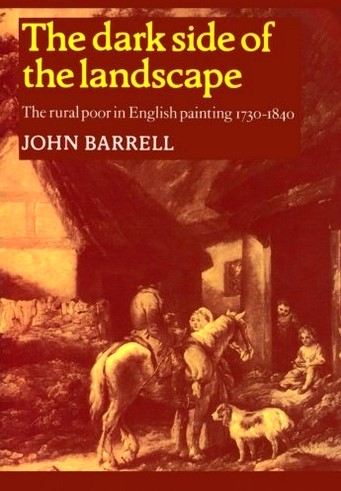
Cover of the paperback edition of The dark side of the landscape featuring Door of a Village Inn (cropped) by George Morland.

John Charles Barrell FBA FEA (born February 1943) is a British scholar of eighteenth and early nineteenth century studies.

== Early life ==
John Barrell was born in February 1943. He took his first degree at Trinity College, Cambridge, and his PhD at the University of Essex.

== Career ==
Barrell was a lecturer in the Department of Literature at Essex for four years from 1968. In 1972, he took up a lectureship in the Faculty of English at Cambridge and a fellowship at King's College, Cambridge. He was appointed to a chair in English at the University of Sussex in 1985 and was Professor of English at the University of York from 1993 to 2012, where he was one of the founders of the Centre for Eighteenth Century Studies. In January 2013 he became Professor of English at Queen Mary, University of London, and, since January 2016, has been Professor Emeritus there. He has held a British Academy readership and a Leverhulme Major Research Fellowship.

== Research ==
Barrell's main research is within the field of literature, history and art in the eighteenth and early nineteenth centuries in Britain. This focuses particularly on language, landscape, law, empire, theories of society and progress, and the theory of painting.

== Honours ==
Described by Colin McCabe as "the finest literary critic of our generation", Barrell has been awarded honorary degrees by the University of Chicago (2008) and by the Courtauld Institute of Art, University of London (2010). He is an honorary fellow of King's College, Cambridge. He is a fellow of the British Academy and the English Association.

== Family ==
In 1992, Barrell married Harriet Guest in London.

== Selected publications ==
=== Sole author ===
- The Idea of Landscape and the Sense of Place 1730-1840: An Approach to the Poetry of John Clare. Cambridge University Press, 1972.
- The Dark Side of the Landscape: the Rural Poor in English Painting, 1730-1840. Cambridge University Press, 1980.
- English Literature in History 1730-1780: An Equal, Wide Survey. Hutchinson and St Martin's, 1983.
- The Political Theory of Painting from Reynolds to Hazlitt: The Body of the Public. Yale University Press, 1986.
- Poetry, Language and Politics. Manchester University Press, 1988.
- The Infection of Thomas De Quincey: A Psychopathology of Imperialism. Yale University Press, 1992.
- The Birth of Pandora and the Division of Knowledge. Macmillan and University of Pennsylvania Press, 1992.
- Imagining the King's Death: Figurative Treason, Fantasies of Regicide 1793-1796. Oxford University Press, 2000.
- The Spirit of Despotism: Invasions of Privacy in the 1790s. Oxford University Press, 2006.
- Edward Pugh of Ruthin 1763-1813 ’A Native Artist'. University of Wales Press, 2013.
- ‘The Meeting of the Waters’, ‘Critical Quarterly’, April 2018, vol. 60, no. 1, pp. 5-86.

=== Edited works ===
- S.T. Coleridge, On the Constitution of the Church and State According to the Idea of Each. Everyman, 1972.
- The Penguin Book of Pastoral Verse. Allen Lane, 1972. (Edited with John Bull)
- Painting and the Politics of Culture: New Essays on British Art 1700-1850. Oxford University Press, 1992.
- Exhibition Extraordinary!! Radical Broadsides of the Mid 1790s. Trent Editions, 2001.
- Trials for Treason and Sedition 1792-1794. Pickering and Chatto, 2006, 2007. (Co-edited with Jon Mee, 8 vols.)
- The Complete Writings of William Fox. Trent Editions, 2011. (Co-edited with Timothy Whelan)
