= Hirsch Osherovich =

Lithuanian-Jewish poet and playwright in Yiddish (1908–1994)

Hirsch Osherovich (June 25, 1908 – June 6, 1994) was a Lithuanian-Jewish Yiddish poet and playwright.

== Early life ==
Osherovich was Ponevezh, Russian Empire (now Lithuania). His family was exiled along with other Jews at the start of World War I to the Donbas region of what is now Ukraine. The family returned to Ponevezh in 1921 and he graduated a Hebrew high school in 1928. He studied law at Vytautas Magnus University and graduated in 1933.

== Career ==
Osherovich wrote poetry for years before publishing his first in 1934, and worked for the Kaunas-based newspaper, Di Yidishe Shtime. He wrote for other Yiddish newspapers, including Der Emes. He published a collection of poetry entitled Dawn in June 1941, which was destroyed by the Nazis during World War II. He fled to the Soviet Union, living in Moscow, Saratov, and Novosibirsk, before finally settling in Alma-Ata (now in Kazakhstan) during the war, until the Red Army captured Vilna, and he moved there. He wrote for Eynikeyt from 1945 to 1948. He published another poetry collection entitled Out of the Abyss in 1947, which was criticized in Der shtern for promoting bourgeois nationalism. He was arrested in 1949, and sentenced to ten years in a labor camp for anti-Soviet and Zionist nationalist activity.

He was released in 1956 during the Khrushchev Thaw, and returned to Vilna, and became widely recognized as a Yiddish poet in the Soviet Union. His poems were only translated into Russian and Lithuanian, notably by Arseny Tarkovsky, Eduardas Mieželaitis, Justinas Marcinkevičius, and Algimantas Baltakis. His play Men and Supermen was staged in 1968 and a large collection of poetry, Sun Walk, was published in Yiddish in 1969. He also published in Sovetish Heymland.

== Aliyah ==
Osherovich made aliyah to Israel in 1971, despite stating in an earlier poem that he would never leave his native Lithuania. His poetry won several awards, including the Itzik Manger Prize. Several poems were set to music by Abelis Klenickis, Lev Kogan, Majer Bogdanski, and others. He published several more works in Yiddish and one in Hebrew.

He died in Tel Aviv in 1994.

== Legacy ==
Jacob Sternberg and Isaac Ianasovich both praised Osherovich's work.
