= Moisei Teif =

Moisej (Moyshe) Teif
- Born: 9 April 1904; Minsk, Russian Empire
- Died: 23 December 1966; Moscow, USSR
- Notable work: Tsuzamen

Moisei Teif (Russian: Моисей Соломонович Тейф, Moisei Solomonovich Teif; Hebrew: משה בן שלמה טייף, Moshe ben Shlomo Teif, also Moshe Taif) (September 4, 1904 – December 23, 1966) was a Yiddish Soviet poet born in Minsk, Belarus. He died in Moscow on December 23, 1966. He was a member of the editorial board of one of the few Soviet Yiddish magazines "Sovetish Heymland" [Soviet Homeland].

Books (list to be updated):

1. Teif, Moishe. Proletarke, shvester mayne: novele. Minsk: Melukhe-farlag, 1935.
2. Teif, Moishe. Tsuzamen: kinder-zamlung. Minsk: Melukhe-farlag fun Vaysrusland, 1935.
