= Mosada =

1886 short verse play in three scenes by William Butler Yeats

Mosada is a short verse play in three scenes written by William Butler Yeats and published in 1886.

The only characters are Mosada, a "moorish girl," her friend the hunchback child Cola, a Christian monk and a few nameless inquisitors. The play is set in a fictional kingdom.

In the first scene, Mosada laments her separation from her Christian lover Gomez. Using magic she attempts to conjure up a vision of him, but is interrupted when inquisitors arrive to arrest her.

In the second scene, the inquisitors deliberate over her fate with the old monk, who is not told the identity of the girl. They decide she must be executed.

In the third and final scene, Mosada, alone and in prison, commits suicide by sucking a drop of poison from her ring. The monk arrives to announce her fate and is shocked to discover his prisoner is Mosada: he reveals that he himself is her lover Gomez.

In its original publication, the play was followed by a lyric that was later renamed "The Song of the Happy Shepherd."

== Sources ==
- Yeats, William Butler. 2003. Mosada. Whitefish, MT: Kessinger Publishing. ISBN 0-7661-7973-7.
- Mosada at Internet Archive.
- Mosada at Project Gutenberg
