= Palhallan =

Village in Jammu and Kashmir, India

- Village
- Location in Jammu and Kashmir, India Palhallan (India)
- Coordinates: 34.1813°N 74.5427°E
- Country: India
- Union territory: Jammu and Kashmir
- District: Baramulla

Area
  - Total: 971.3 ha (2,400 acres)

Population (2011)
  - Total: 14,206
  - Density: 1,463/km^{2} (3,788/sq mi)

Languages
  - Official: Kashmiri, Urdu, Hindi, Dogri,
- Time zone: UTC+5:30 (IST)
- PIN: 193121

Palhallan is a census village in Baramula district, Jammu & Kashmir, India.

As per the 2011 Census of India, Palhallan has a total population of 14,206 people including 7,399 males and 6,807 females with a literacy rate of 45.28%.
