= Rossana Ombres =

Italian writer and journalist (1931–2009)

Rossana Ombres (1931-2009) was an Italian poet, journalist and novelist.

== Life ==
Rossana Ombres was born in Turin. Her novels and poetry draw on her Piedmont childhood. After graduating from University of Turin, she became a journalist and literary critic for La Stampa. Her first three publications were volumes of poetry. Ombres then moved to narrative prose.

Her first novel, Principessa Giacinta (1970), mixed feminist concerns with experimental form. The novel's female protagonist is shut away in a room to escape pollution, only communicating by telephone to the newspaper which employs her. She appears to occasionally self-identify with the wife of Martin Luther, and is waiting for a lost or stolen manuscript somehow associated with a previous marriage.

== Works ==
- Principessa anche tu [You too are a princess], 1956.
- Le ciminiere di Casale[The smokestacks of Casale]. Einaudi, 1962.
- L'ipotesi di Agar [Agar's hypothesis], 1968.
- Principessa Giacinta [Princess Giacinta]. Rizzoli, 1970.
- Bestiario d'amore [Animal love], 1974.
- Le belle statuine [The nice little statues], 1975.
- Orfeo Che Amò Orfeo, Poema Dramatica [Orpheus, a dramatic poem], 1975.
- Memorie di una dilettante [Memories of an amateur], 1977.
- Serenata [The call], 1980.
- Baladera, 1997.
