= Jun Kawada =

Japanese tanka poet and entrepreneur

Jun Kawada (川田 順, Kawada Jun; 15 January 1882 – 22 January 1966) was a Japanese tanka poet and entrepreneur active during the Shōwa period of Japan.

== Biography ==
Kawada was born in the plebeian Asakusa district of Tokyo as the third son of noted Chinese literature scholar Kawada Oko. He graduated from the Law School of Tokyo Imperial University with a degree in political science in 1907. On graduation, he obtained a job at the headquarters of the Sumitomo zaibatsu.

He wrote a modern translation to the poetry classic Shin Kokin Wakashū, and was active in submitting poetry to various literary magazines. He considered himself to be a disciple of the noted poet Sasaki Nobutsuna. In 1942, he was nominated to the Imperial Academy of the Arts. He was known for his prolific production of poetry on patriotic themes during World War II.

After the war, Kawada was responsible for organizing the annual New Year Poetry Reading ceremony at the Imperial Palace, and as poet laureate he was the selector of the poems to be read by the Crown Prince. In 1950 he gained notoriety by eloping at the age of 68 with the young wife of one of his disciples. In a poem about this relationship, he wrote that "to an old man approaching his grave, love holds no fear."

His grave is at the temple of Tokei-ji in Kamakura, Kanagawa.

== See also ==
- Japanese literature
- List of Japanese authors
