= G. S. Sharat Chandra =

American poet

- Born: 1935
- Died: 2000 (aged 64–65)
- Education: University of Iowa (M.F.A.)
- Writing career
- Notable awards: Pulitzer Prize (1993)

G. S. Sharat Chandra (1935–2000) was an author of both poetry and fiction. Much of his work touches on the deep emotions of the Indian American immigrant.

Indian-born Chandra received a law degree in India but came to the United States in the 1960s to become a writer. He received his Masters of Fine Arts form the Iowa Writers Workshop. For most of his career, Chandra taught at the University of Missouri-Kansas City as a professor of Creative Writing and English (1983–2000). His most famous work, Family of Mirrors, was a 1993 Pulitzer Prize nominee for poetry. Author of ten books, including translations from Sanskrit and English into the Indian Kannada language, a former Fulbright Fellow and recipient of an NEA Fellowship in Creative Writing, Chandra has given readings at the Library of Congress, Oxford, and McDaid's Pub in Dublin.

Chandra traveled the world extensively throughout his life and received international recognition for both his poetry and fiction. His works have appeared in many journals including American Poetry Review, London Magazine, The Nation, and Partisan Review.

Chandra was married to his wife, Jane for 38 years until he died of a brain aneurysm in 2000. He left three children. The GS Sharat Chandra Award is an award given in the field of literature. This award is given for outstanding contribution to Indian writing, especially to those who write in English.

== Work ==
- April in Nanjangud, Alan Ross Ltd., London Magazine Editions, 1971;
- Once or Twice, Hippopotamus Press, UK, 1974;
- The Ghost of Meaning, Lewis-Clark State College, Confluence Press, Idaho, 1976;
- Heirloom, Oxford University Press, 1982;
- Family of Mirrors, BkMk Press, 1993;
- Immigrants of Loss, Hippopotamus Press, 1993–94,
- Sari of the Gods, 1998.

Sharat was a gifted teacher of creative writing. He encouraged persistence, craft, and imagination. He did so with humor and compassion. As a teacher at the Mark Twain Writer's Workshop, he once read from a stack of rejection letters, which he claimed papered the walls of his writing study. With regard to the writerly imagination, and the importance of craft, he once said: "You can tell me anything, anything at all. Just make me believe!"
