= Sibella Elizabeth Miles =

English poet

Sibella Elizabeth Miles (née Hatfield; 1800–1882), was an English schoolteacher, poet and writer of the 19th century.

== Biography ==
Sibella Elizabeth Miles was born at Falmouth 28 September 1800, and was the daughter of John Westby Hatfield, an auctioneer in West Cornwall, who died at York 13 January 1839, aged 72, by his wife Sibella, who died on 1 June 1832, aged 68.

Sibella Miles ran a girls' boarding-school at Penzance for a number of years prior to 1833 and occupied her leisure hours with the composition of poetry. On 13 August 1833 she married, at Madron, Cornwall, Alfred Miles, a commander in the Royal Navy, who was afterwards an assistant in the hydrographic department of the admiralty, and edited two editions (1841 and 1852) of Horsburgh's Indian Directory. He died at Lympston, Devonshire, 28 November 1851, leaving one son, Frederick Arundel Miles, who died 3 June 1862, aged 26, and one daughter, Helen Jane Arundel Miles, a book illustrator. Mrs. Miles died at 54 South Lambeth Road on 29 March 1882.

== Works ==
She wrote:

1. The Wanderer of Scandinavia, or Sweden delivered, in five cantos, 1826, 2 vols.
2. Moments of Loneliness, or Prose and Poetic Efforts, 1829.
3. Fruits of Solitude, 1831. This was dedicated to Sir R. T. Wilson, and a letter from him to her is printed in his Essay on Canning's Administration.
4. Essay on the Factory Question (anon.), 1844.
5. Leisure Evenings, or Records of the Past, 1860.
6. The Grotto of Neptune, 1864.

Many of her contributions appeared in the Forget-me-Not for 1825 and subsequent years, the Selector or Cornish Magazine, 1826–8, the Oriental Herald for 1827 and later volumes, and the Nautical Magazine for 1833 onwards. Some poems in Original Cornish Ballads, 1846 (pt. ii.), with the introductory essay, were by her, and she wrote the introduction to Te Deum, with illustrations by Helen J. A. Miles (1877). Her lines on St. Michael's Mount, Cornwall, are quoted in works on West Cornwall.
