= Susan Yeats =

Susan Yeats may refer to:

- Susan Lily Yeats, embroiderer, daughter of John Butler Yeats
- Susan Pollexfen, married to John Butler Yeats
