= Dun Emer Guild =

Irish textile craft studio

The Dun Emer Guild was an Irish Arts and Crafts textile studio founded in 1902 by Evelyn Gleeson, initially in partnership with Elizabeth and Lily Yeats as part of "Dun Emer Industries and Press". Dun Emer Press ceased in 1908 but the craft studio lasted until 1964.

== History ==
The Dun Emer Guild was the textile producing arm of Dun Emer Industries, which was founded in 1902 by Evelyn Gleeson, Elizabeth and her sister Lily Yeats with funding from Augustine Henry and a sum of money Gleeson inherited. The company was run out of Gleeson's home, Dun Emer in Dundrum. The house and administration of the company was overseen by Gleeson's widowed sister, Constance MacCormack. MacCormack and her three children, Kitty, Grace, and Edward lived with Gleeson after the death of MacCormack's husband c. 1902.

The Dun Emer studio and press were named after Emer, daughter of Forgall Monach, wife of the hero Cúchulainn in the Ulster Cycle of Irish mythology, a figure famous for her artistic skills. The Guild's workshops were located on the top floor of Dun Emer. The stated aim of the Dun Emer Guild was "to find work for Irish hands in the making of beautiful things". Their products regularly won prizes at exhibitions run by the Irish Industries Association and the Royal Dublin Society. The Guild exhibited at the 1904 St Louis World's Fair, in the United States as part of the Irish Industrial Exhibition. The Guild became noted for their hand woven carpets and tapestries which incorporated Celtic knotwork and interlace, such as the tapestry panel of A voyage to Tir-na-noge designed by Mary Galway Houston in 1903.

By 1908, Gleeson's and the Yeats sisters' relationship had become strained, with the Yeats sisters leaving Dun Emer with their private press, which they renamed the Cuala Press. Gleeson continued as the Dun Emer Guild designing and creating textiles. By this time her two nieces, Kitty and Grace, along with Henry's niece May Kerley, were all employed in the Guild, as well as bookbinder Norah Fitzpatrick, and Máire Nic Shiubhlaigh.

Some of the most notable works from the Guild are the tapestries for the Honan Chapel, Cork in 1917, the vestments for St Patrick's church, San Francisco in 1923, and a carpet presented to Pope Pius XI in 1931. The carpet was commissioned in an effort by Ireland's ambassador to the Vatican, Charles Bewley, to secure Ireland as the host of the 1932 International Eucharistic Congress. As "The Pope's Carpet" it was exhibited in Clerys from 19 to 30 January 1931. A dress designed by MacCormack for Clare Kennedy, the wife of Hugh Kennedy, is on display as part of the exhibition The Way We Wore in the National Museum of Ireland at Collins Barracks.

After Gleeson's death in 1944, MacCormack continued to run Dun Emer Guild until its store on Harcourt Street closed c. 1964.
