= Cuala Press =

Irish publishing business (1908–1946, 1970s)

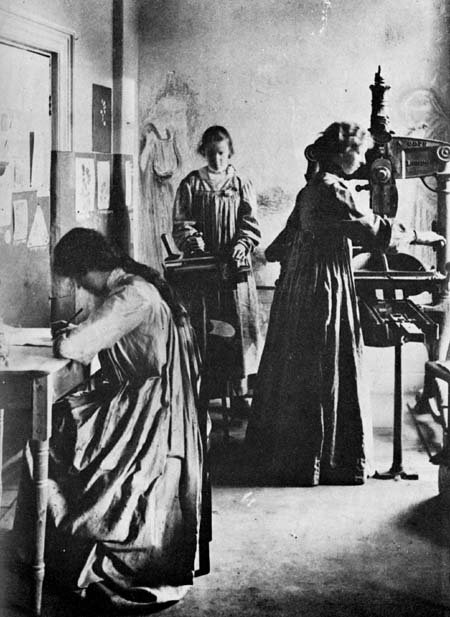
Elizabeth Yeats using the Cuala Press (1903)

The Cuala Press was an Irish private press set up in 1908 by Elizabeth Yeats with support from her brother William Butler Yeats that played an important role in the Celtic Revival of the early 20th century. Originally Dun Emer Press, from 1908 until the late 1940s it functioned as Cuala Press, publicising the works of such writers as W. B. Yeats, Lady Gregory, Padraic Colum, John Millington Synge, and Oliver St. John Gogarty.

== Origins ==
At the suggestion of Emery Walker, Elizabeth Yeats trained as a printer at the Women's Printing Society in London. In 1902, Elizabeth Yeats and her sister Lily joined their friend Evelyn Gleeson in the establishment of a craft studio near Dublin which they named Dun Emer. Dun Emer became a focus of the burgeoning Irish Arts and Crafts Movement, specialising in printing, embroidery, and rug and tapestry-making. Elizabeth ran the printing operation, and Lily managed the needlework department.

In 1904, the operation was reorganised into two parts, the Dun Emer Guild run by Gleeson and Dun Emer Industries under the direction of the Yeats sisters, and in 1908 the groups separated completely. Gleeson retained the Dun Emer name, and the Yeats sisters established Cuala Industries at nearby Churchtown, which ran the Cuala Press and an embroidery workshop. The sisters' cousin Ruth Pollexfen served as an apprentice to Lily and gave embroidery lessons at the workshop. Cuala (or Cualu) was the name of the Gaelic territory covering south Dublin before the Norman conquest of Ireland.

== Operations ==
It was intended that the new press would produce work by writers associated with the Irish Literary Revival. They ended up publishing over 70 titles in total, including 48 by W. B. Yeats. The press closed in 1946.

The Cuala was unusual in that it was the only Arts and Crafts press to be run and staffed by women and the only one that published new work rather than established classics. In addition to Yeats, Cuala published works by Ezra Pound, Jack B. Yeats, Padraic Colum, Robin Flower, Elizabeth Bowen, Oliver St. John Gogarty, Lady Gregory, Douglas Hyde, Lionel Johnson, Patrick Kavanagh, Louis MacNeice, John Masefield, Frank O'Connor, John Millington Synge, John Butler Yeats, Rabindranath Tagore and others.

After Elizabeth Yeats died in 1940, the work of the press was carried on by two of her long-time assistants, Esther Ryan and Mollie Gill under the management of Georgie Hyde-Lees. The final Cuala title was Stranger in Aran by Elizabeth Rivers, which was published on 31 July 1946.

In 1969 the press was taken up by W. B. Yeats' children, Michael and Anne Yeats, with Liam Miller. Some titles were run in the 1970s, and archives are still held by the press.

== Books published by the press ==
- Poetry & Ireland: Essays by W. B. Yeats, Cuala Press, 1908.
- Poems & Translations by J. M. Synge, Cuala Press, 1909.
- The Green Helmet: And Other Poems by W. B. Yeats, Cuala Press, 1910.
- Deirdre of the Sorrows: A Play by J. M. Synge, Cuala Press, 1910.
- Synge and the Ireland of his Time by W. B. Yeats, Cuala Press, 1911.
- Selections from the Writings of Lord Dunsany by Baron Dunsany, Cuala Press, 1912
- Poems Written in Discouragement by W. B. Yeats, Cuala Press, 1913
- A Woman's Reliquary by Edward Dowden, Cuala Press, 1913.
- A Selection from the Love Poetry of W. B. Yeats by W. B. Yeats, Cuala Press, 1913.
- Responsibilities: Poems and a Play by W. B. Yeats, Cuala Press, 1914.
- The Post Office: A Play by Rabindranath Tagore, Cuala Press, 1914.
- The Hour Glass by W. B. Yeats, Cuala Press, 1914.
- John M. Synge: A Few Personal Recollections with Biographical Notes by John Masefield, Cuala Press, 1915.
- Reveries over Childhood and Youth by W. B. Yeats, Cuala Press, 1915.
- Certain Noble Plays of Japan by Ernest Fenollosa, edited by Ezra Pound, Cuala Press, 1916.
- Passages from the Letters of John Butler Yeats by John Butler Yeats, edited by Ezra Pound, Cuala Press, 1917.
- Wild Swans at Coole: Other Verses and a Play in Verse by W. B. Yeats, Cuala Press, 1917.
- Kiltartan Poetry Book by Lady Gregory, Cuala Press, 1918.
- Two Plays for Dances by W. B. Yeats, Cuala Press, 1919.
- Further Letters of John Butler Yeats: Selected by Lennox Robinson, Cuala Press, 1920.
- Michael Robartes and the Dancer by W. B. Yeats, Cuala Press, 1920.
- Four Years by W. B. Yeats, Cuala Press, 1921.
- Seven Poems and a Fragment by W. B. Yeats, Cuala Press, 1922.
- An Offering of Swans by Oliver St. John Gogarty, Cuala Press, 1923.
- Early Memories: Some Chapters of Autobiography by John Butler Yeats, Cuala Press, 1923.
- The Cat and the Moon and Certain Poems by W. B. Yeats, Cuala Press, 1924.
- The Bounty of Sweden: A Meditation, and a Lecture Delivered before the Royal Swedish Academy and Certain Notes by W. B. Yeats, Cuala Press, 1925.
- Love's Bitter-Sweet: Translations from the Irish Poets of the Sixteenth and Seventeenth Centuries by Robin Flower, Cuala Press, 1925.
- Estrangement: Being Some Fifty Thoughts from a Diary kept by William Butler Yeats in the Year Nineteen Hundred and Nine by W. B. Yeats, Cuala Press, 1926.
- Poems by Thomas Parnell by Thomas Parnell, edited by Lennox Robinson, Cuala Press, 1927.
- October Blast by W. B. Yeats, Cuala Press, 1927.
- A Little Anthology of Modern Irish Verse edited by Lennox Robinson, Cuala Press, 1928.
- The Death of Synge: And Other Passages from an Old Diary by W. B. Yeats, Cuala Press, 1928.
- A Packet for Ezra Pound by W. B. Yeats, Cuala Press, 1928.
- Lyrics and Satires from Tom Moore by Thomas Moore, edited by Seán O'Faoláin, Cuala Press, 1929.
- Wild Apples by Oliver St. John Gogarty, Cuala Press, 1930.
- Coole by Lady Gregory, Cuala Press, 1931.
- Stories of Michael Robartes and his Friends: An Extract from a Record Made by his Pupils: And a Play in Prose by W. B. Yeats, Cuala Press, 1931.
- Words for Music Perhaps and Other Poems by W. B. Yeats, Cuala Press, 1932.
- The Wild Bird's Nest: Poems from the Irish by Frank O'Connor, Cuala Press, 1932.
- Arable Holdings by F.R. Higgins, Cuala Press, 1933.
- A Pilgrimage in the West by Mario Rossi, Cuala Press, 1933.
- The King of the Great Clock Tower, Commentaries and Poems by W. B. Yeats, Cuala Press, 1934.
- The Words upon the Window Pane: A Play in One Act, with Notes upon the Play and its Subject by W. B. Yeats, Cuala Press, 1934.
- Poems by W. B. Yeats, Cuala Press, Cuala Press, 1935.
- Dramatis Personae by W. B. Yeats, Cuala Press, 1935.
- Broadsides: a collection of old and new songs, 1935. / Songs by W. B. Yeats, James Stephens, F. R. Higgins, Frank O'Connor, Lynn Doyle, Bryan Guiness, Padraic Colum; illustrations by Jack B. Yeats [and others]; music by Arthur Duff. Cuala Press 1935.
- Some Passages from the Letters of AE to W. B. Yeats by George William Russell, Cuala Press, 1936.
- Broadsides: A Collection of New Irish and English Songs, 1935 edited by Dorothy Wellesley and W. B. Yeats, Cuala Press, 1937.
- Lords and Commons translations from the Irish by Frank O'Connor, Cuala Press, 1938.
- New Poems by W. B. Yeats, Cuala Press, 1938.
- On the Boiler by W. B. Yeats, Cuala Press, 1939.
- Last Poems and Two Plays by W. B. Yeats, Cuala Press, 1939.
- Elbow Room by Oliver St. John Gogarty, Cuala Press, 1939.
- If I Were Four-And-Twenty. Yeats, W. B. (1940)
- Some Memories Of W.B.Yeats. Masefield, John. (1940).
- The Last Ditch. Macneice, Louis.(1941)
- Yeats, W.B. Florence Farr, Bernard Shaw And W.B. Yeats.. Edited By Clifford Bax
- Three Tales O'Connor, Frank. (1941).
- Veterans And Other Poems. MacDonagh, Donagh. (1941).
- Seven Winters Bowen, Elizabeth. (1942)
- The Great Hunger. Kavanagh, Patrick. (1942
- A Picture Book O’Connor, Frank. . Illustrated By Elizabeth Rivers (1943)
- La La Noo. Yeats, Jack B (1943)
- Pages From A Diary Written In Nineteen Hundred And Thirty. Yeats, William Butler. (1944)
- Selected Poems Ap Gwilym, Dafydd. Translated By Nigel Heseltine, With A Preface By Frank O’Connor (1944)
- The Love Story Of Thomas Davis Told In The Letters Of Annie Hutton. Davis, Thomas.Edited With An Introduction By Joseph Hone; (1945)
- Stranger in Aran Elizabeth Rivers. (1946)

== See also ==
- Responsibilities and Other Poems
