= Kitty MacCormack =

Irish designer and owner of the Dun Emer Guild

- Born: 1892
- Died: June 26, 1975 (aged 82–83); Ireland
- Other names: Katherine MacCormack, Kathleen MacCormack
- Occupation: designer
- Known for: owner of Dun Emer Press

Kitty MacCormack (1892 – 1975) was an Irish designer with the Dun Emer Guild, theatre set designer, actress and author.

== Early life and family ==
Kitty MacCormack (sometimes spelt McCormack) was the daughter of Constance MacCormack, and niece of Evelyn Gleeson. She was born in 1892, and after the death of her father in 1902, the family lived with Gleeson at her home, at Runnemede, Sandyford Road, Dublin with her mother and siblings, Grace (1898–1982) and Edward (1889–1906). With her sister, McCormack worked in the Dun Emer Guild from a young age, particularly after the Yeats sisters left Dun Emer to form Cuala Industries.

== Theatrical work ==
MacCormack also did some acting, theatre set design and was an author. She appeared in Joseph Plunkett's 1912 play The Dance of Osiris at the Hardwicke Theatre, and designed the sets. She often acted under the name Catia or Caitia Nic Cormac. She also designed sets for the Irish National Theatre Society, Theatre Company of Ireland and the Dublin Drama League.

== Career at Dun Emer ==
Some of her most notable works are the tapestries for the Honan Chapel, Cork in 1917, the vestments for St Patrick's church, San Francisco in 1923, and a carpet presented to Pope Pius XI in 1931. The carpet commissioned in an effort by Ireland's ambassador to the Vatican, Charles Bewley, to secure Ireland as the host of the 1932 International Eucharistic Congress. It was designed by MacCormack, took workers in the Guild almost 4 months to hand weave and cost £450. As "The Pope's Carpet" it was exhibited in Clerys from 19 to 30 January 1931.

She designed the poster for the 1927 "Grand Pageant of Dublin History". She also developed a set of designs for judicial robes for W. T. Cosgrave in 1924, drawing on the Brehon style sketches of which are held in University College Dublin Archives. In 1911 and 1920, she exhibited at the Oireachtas Art Exhibitions, and with the Water Colour Society of Ireland throughout the 1920s. MacCormack was also an illustrator, beginning with Christmas card designs for Dun Emer in the 1910s. She illustrated John Hackett Pollock's 1919 The wisdom of the world: A book of wonder-tales published by Colm Ó Lochlainn's Candle Press under Pollock's pseudonym An Philibín. MacCormack edited a volume for Ó Lochlainn in 1920, The Book of St Ultan; a collection of pictures and poems by Irish artists and writers, proceeds of which went to St Ultan's Hospital. As well as editing, she contributed illustrations and two poems to the volume.

After her aunt's death in 1944, MacCormack continued to run Dun Emer Guild until its store on Harcourt Street closed around 1964.

== Death and legacy ==
MacCormack died on 26 June 1975. A large collection of theatre ephemera collected by MacCormack was sold in 2008. The Kitty MacCormack Archive is held by the Jackie Clarke Archive, and the National Library of Ireland also holds a collection of her theatre ephemera and letters. A dress designed by MacCormack for Clare Kennedy, the wife of Hugh Kennedy, is on display as part of The Way We Wore an exhibition in National Museum of Ireland at Collins Barracks.
