= Dun Emer Press =

1902-08 Irish private press founded and run by the Yeats siblings and Evelyn Gleeson

- Type: Publishing
- Founded: Evelyn Gleeson; Elizabeth Yeats; William Butler Yeats
- Founder: 1902
- Defunct: 1908
- Headquarters: Ireland

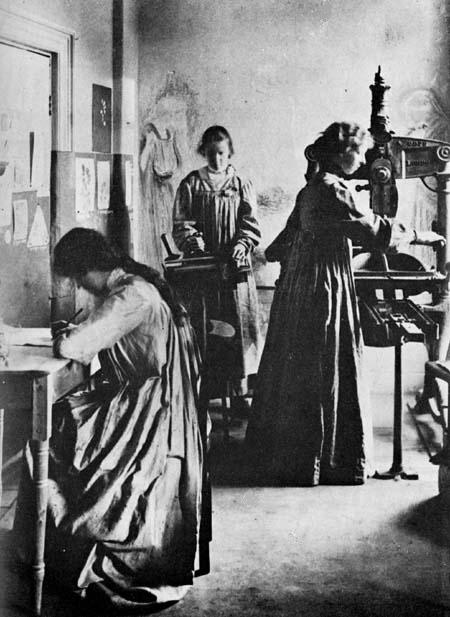
The Dun Emer Press at work, ca. 1903

The Dun Emer Press (fl. 1902–1908) was an Irish private press founded in 1902 by Evelyn Gleeson, Elizabeth Yeats and her brother William Butler Yeats, part of the Celtic Revival. It was named after the legendary Emer and evolved into the Cuala Press.

== History ==
In 1902, Elizabeth and her sister Lily Yeats joined Evelyn Gleeson in establishing a craft studio at Dundrum, near Dublin, called Dun Emer. This specialized in printing and other crafts, with Elizabeth Yeats in charge of the printing press. While living in London, Elizabeth Yeats had been part of the circle of William Morris, and had been inspired by his printing work. Gleeson offered the Yeats sisters her large house in Dundrum, in which a crafts group providing training and work for young women, in the fields of bookbinding, printing, weaving, and embroidery, could live and work. Bookbinding workshops were a later addition to the studio. The sisters' cousin Ruth Pollexfen served as Lily's apprentice in the embroidery section.

The Dun Emer studio and press were named after Emer, daughter of Forgall Monach, wife of the hero Cúchulainn in the Ulster Cycle of Irish mythology, a figure famous for her artistic skills as well as her beauty. The title-page device of the Dun Emer Press was designed by Elinor Monsell and shows Emer standing underneath a tree. Monsell also created the symbol of the Abbey Theatre, Dublin, which depicts Maeve with a wolfhound. The focus of the Press was on publishing literary work by Irish authors, and Elizabeth and Lily Yeats's younger brother, the artist Jack Butler Yeats, did much of the illustration work.

In 1904, the Dun Emer crafts studio was organized into two parts, the Dun Emer Guild under Gleeson and Dun Emer Industries under the Yeats sisters.

The Dun Emer Press produced limited editions of books, printed by hand in the manner of William Morris's Kelmscott Press. The texts it published were written or selected by W. B. Yeats, who was the press's literary editor and who also subsidized its operations, which lacked profitability. In its prospectus issued early in 1903, the press boasted of "a good eighteenth century fount of type" and "paper made of linen rags and without bleaching chemicals".

As well as books, the Press also printed broadsheets designed by Jack Yeats, and hand-coloured greeting cards. In 1908, after the Press had produced eleven literary titles, the different elements of the Dun Emer studio separated completely, with Gleeson retaining the Dun Emer name. The Yeats sisters left Dundrum and took the new name Cuala for their operations, Elizabeth establishing the Cuala Press at Churchtown, Dublin.

== List of books published by the press ==
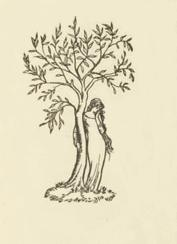
Device of the Dun Emer Press, designed by Elinor Monsell

- W. B. Yeats, In the Seven Woods: being poems of the Irish heroic age (The Dun Emer press, 1903)
- George William Russell, The Nuts of Knowledge, lyrical poems old and new (The Dun Emer press, 1903)
- Douglas Hyde, The Love Songs of Connacht, being the fourth chapter of the songs of Connacht, collected and translated by Douglas Hyde (Dun Emer press, 1904)
- W. B. Yeats, Stories of Red Hanrahan (The Dun Emer press, 1904)
- Lionel Pigot Johnson, Twenty one poems written by Lionel Johnson, selected by William Butler Yeats (The Dun Emer Press, 1904)
- William Kirkpatrick Magee, Some Essays and Passages by John Eglinton, selected by William Butler Yeats (Dun Emer Press, 1905)
- William Allingham, Sixteen poems, by William Allingham, Selected by William Butler Yeats (The Dun Emer press, 1905)
- Lady Gregory, A Book of Saints and Wonders put down here by Lady Gregory according to the old writings and memory of the people of Ireland (The Dun Emer Press, 1906)
- George William Russell, By Still Waters; lyrical poems old and new by A. E. (The Dun Emer Press, 1906)
- Katharine Tynan, Twenty one poems; selected by W. B. Yeats (Dun Emer press, 1907)
- W. B. Yeats, Discoveries; a volume of essays by William Butler Yeats (Dun Emer press, 1907)
