= Evelyn Gleeson =

Anglo-Irish embroiderer, designer and co-founder of the Dun Emer Press

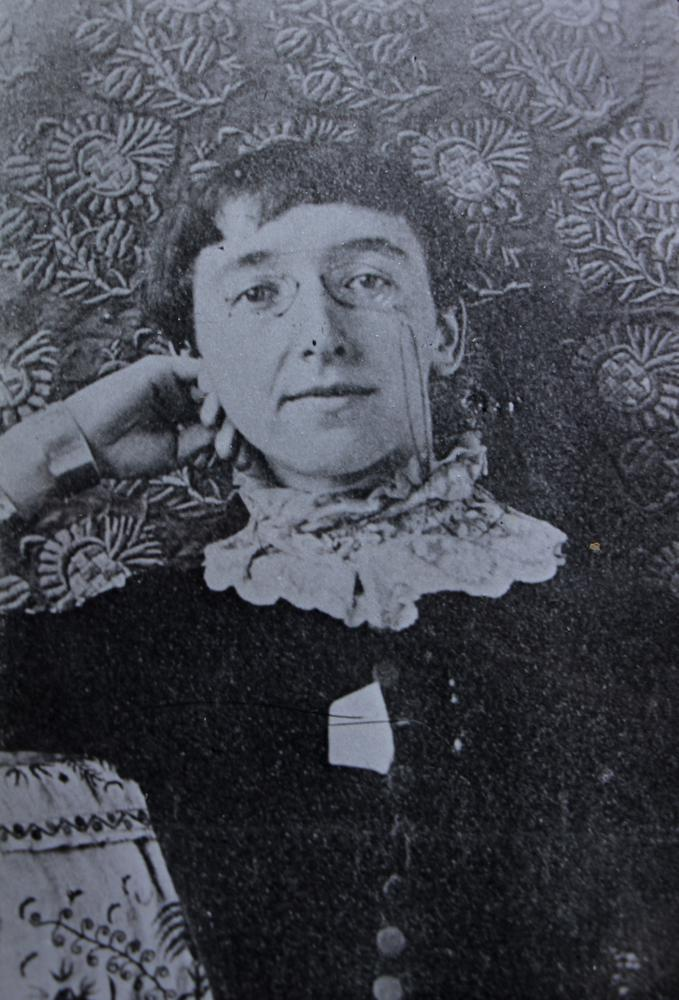
- Born: 15 May 1855; Knutsford, Cheshire, United Kingdom
- Died: 20 February 1944 (aged 88); Dun Emer, Dundrum, Dublin, Ireland
- Occupation: designer
- Known for: founder of Dun Emer Press

Evelyn Gleeson (15 May 1855 – 20 February 1944) was an English embroidery, carpet, and tapestry designer, who along with Elizabeth and Lily Yeats established the Dun Emer Press.

== Early life and education ==
Evelyn Gleeson was born in Knutsford, Cheshire, on 15 May 1855. She was the daughter of an Irish doctor, Edward Moloney Gleeson. Her mother was Harriet (née Simpson), from Bolton, Lancashire. Edward had a practice in Knutsford, and whilst visiting Ireland he was struck by the unemployment and poverty, so much so he established the Athlone Woollen Mills in 1859 on the advice of his brother-in-law, a textile manufacturer in Lancashire. While the Gleeson family moved to Athlone in 1863, Evelyn attended school in England where she trained to be a teacher and then studied portraiture in London at the Atelier Ludovici from 1890 to 1892. From this, Gleeson went on to study design under Alexander Millar who was a member of the Arts and Crafts movement and a follower of William Morris. He was struck by Gleeson's aptitude for colour-blending, and at this time a number of her designs were purchased by Templeton Carpets of Glasgow, as Millar was their artistic director.

== Ireland and establishment of Dun Emer ==
Gleeson was interested in Irish affairs, through her membership of the Gaelic League and the Irish Literary Society. She was also acquainted with the Yeats family and others in the Irish artistic circle in London, drawing inspiration from the romantic Irish revival in art and literature. She was a member of the suffrage movement and served as chairwoman of the London women's club, the Pioneer Club. In 1900 the opportunity arose to contribute to the Irish revival and suffrage for Irish women. On the advice of her friend Augustine Henry, Gleeson moved away from London smog to Ireland to improve her health, and offered her the finances to establish her own craft centre in the form of a loan of £500. She discussed these plans with the Yeats sisters, Elizabeth and Lily, who although they were talented craftswomen with a network of influential contacts, they could not contribute any money to the venture. Gleeson also consulted with W. B. Yeats, Jack Butler Yeats, and her cousin T. P. Gill.

In the summer of 1902, Gleeson found a suitable house in Dundrum, Dublin. The house was called Runnymede, which was renamed Dun Emer in honour of the wife of Cú Chulainn, Emer, who had legendary craft skills. A printing press was installed in November 1902, with three craft industries quickly established. Lily ran the embroidery section, as she had studied with May Morris. Elizabeth led the printing section, drawing on her experience with the Women's Printing Society in London. Gleeson was charged with the weaving and tapestry and managed the studios overall finances. W. B. Yeats was the group's literary advisor, which caused friction at times.

== Career and Dun Emer ==
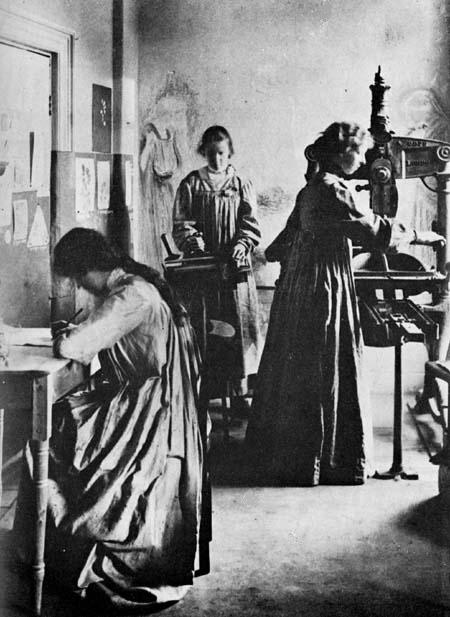
Dun Emer Press, c. 1903

The studio employed and trained local girls, with the emphasis on using high quality Irish materials to create beautiful, luxury, lasting originally designed objects. Their 1903 manifesto stated: "Everything as far as possible is Irish… The designs are also of the spirit and tradition of the country." The workshop had 30 women and girls in employment by 1905. A large proportion of their orders was to the Catholic Church, with Loughrea cathedral commissioning 24 embroidered banners featuring Irish saints in 1902 to 1903. Other objects created including vestments, dresses, drapes, and cushions, featuring elements of Celtic design. The group's first published book was W. B. Yeats' 1903 In the seven woods, covered in Irish linen.

Gleeson often acted as an adjudicator at various craft competitions around Ireland. At the 1904 Feis na nGleann she praised the entries' workmanship but noted the lack of design teaching. On this subject she gave lectures and attempted to elevate the status of craftwork, from household crafts to larger scale industry. Tensions began to run high with the Yeats sisters however who complained about her bad temper and arrogance. This may have been the result of the financial burden of Dun Emer, although supplemented with grants, and she was anxious to pay off the loan to Augustine Henry. These tensions led to the Yeats sisters snubbing her, and making no mention of her in an interview for the magazine House Beautiful on Dun Emer. Gleeson's teacher Millar noted that this omission was akin to "Hamlet without the prince". Ultimately Dun Emer was split in 1904 into Dun Emer Guild Ltd under Gleeson, and Dun Emer Industries Ltd under the Yeatses.

The two groups continued to work, exhibiting separately at the Royal Dublin Society and other craft competitions. The National Museum of Ireland commissioned a copy of a Flemish tapestry in 1907, the resulting tapestry being exhibited at the Arts and Crafts Society in 1910. In 1906 the Guild won a silver medal at the International Exhibition in Milan. By the late 1900s cooperation between the groups had turned to rivalry, resulting in the Yeats sisters leaving, taking their printing press to their home in Churchtown, Dublin. Gleeson wrote off the sisters' debt of £185 on the condition that they could not use the name Dun Emer. They established themselves under the name of the Cuala Industries, which was composed of an embroidery workshop and the Cuala Press.

== Later life ==
Dun Emer continued to thrive, with Gleeson working on designs with her niece Katherine (Kitty) MacCormack and Augustine Henry's niece May Kerley. In 1910 Gleeson became one of the founding members of the Guild of Irish Art Workers, becoming a master in 1917. The workshops eventually moved from Dundrum to Hardwicke Street, Dublin in 1912. Gleeson's rugs, tapestries and embroideries took inspiration from Early Christian interlace and zoomorphic design, with the patronage of the Church remaining their main source of income. Gleeson also employed bookbinder Norah Fitzpatrick, and Máire Nic Shiubhlaigh. Her widowed sister, Constance MacCormack lived with her at Dun Emer, along with her children Grace, Kitty, and Edward. The household was managed by Constance, and Grace and Kitty worked with their aunt from a young age. Amongst Gleeson's notable works are the 1919 banner for the Irish Women Workers’ Union and the carpet that was presented to Pope Pius XI in 1932, the year of the Eucharistic Congress. Kitty worked with her aunt on other Dun Emer commissions, such as the 1917 tapestries for the Honan Chapel in Cork and the gold vestments for St Patrick's church, San Francisco in 1923. Gleeson died 20 February 1944, at Dun Emer, with Kitty carrying on the Guild after her death. The final home of Dun Emer was a shop on Harcourt Street, Dublin, which finally closed in 1964.
