= St. Patrick's Catholic Church, San Francisco =

Church in San Francisco, California, US

Saint Patrick's Catholic Church
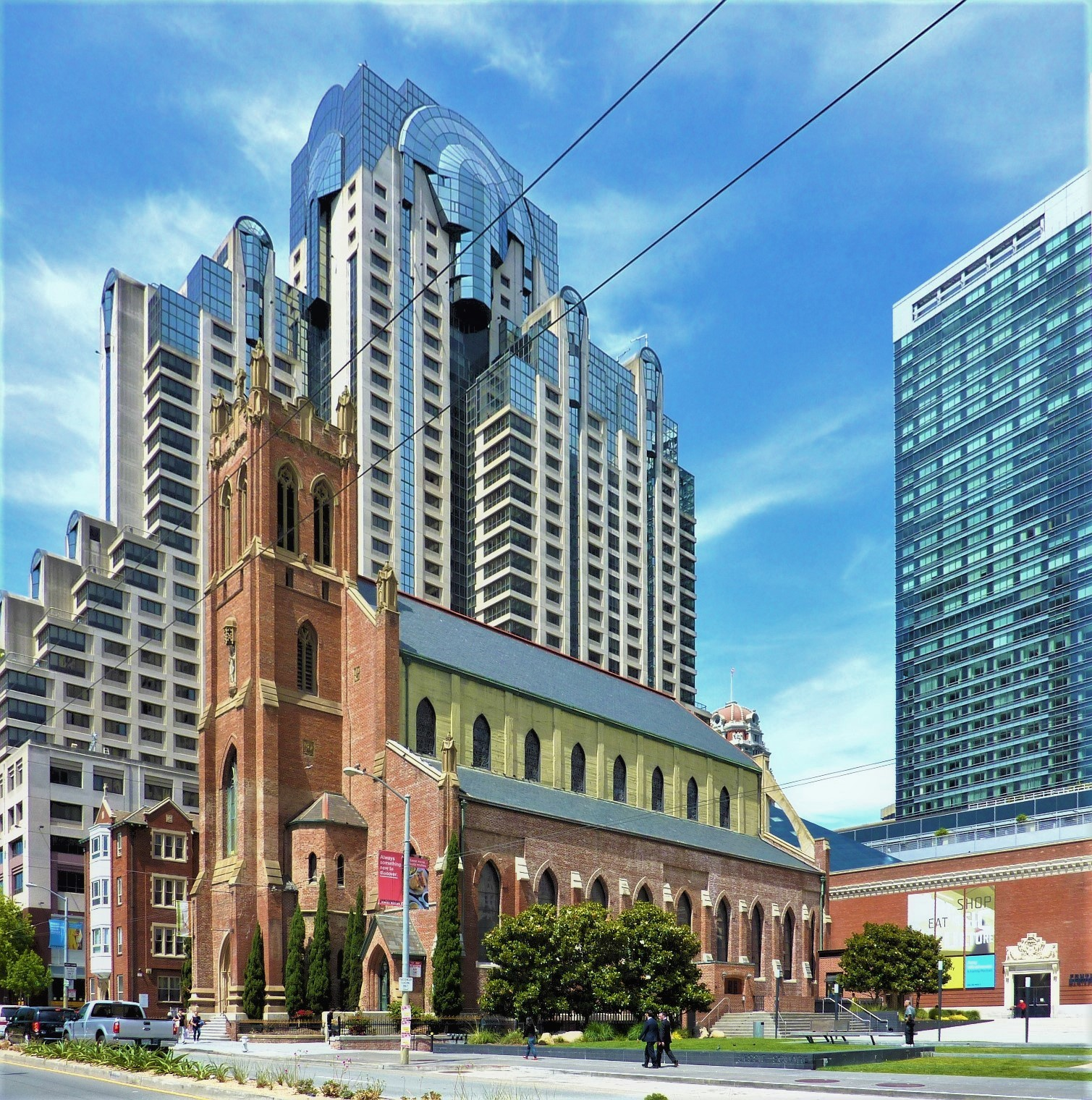

Religion
- Affiliation: Roman Catholic
- Diocese: Archdiocese of San Francisco
- Province: Archdiocese of San Francisco
- Ecclesiastical or organisational status: Church
- Leadership: Archbishop of San Francisco

Location
- Location: San Francisco, California, United States
- Interactive map of Saint Patrick's Catholic Church
- Coordinates: 37.785588°N 122.403508°W

Architecture
- San Francisco Designated Landmark
- Designated: September 3, 1968
- Reference no.: 4

Website
- stpatricksf.org

St. Patrick's Catholic Church is a Catholic church in San Francisco, California, founded in 1851. It is located at 756 Mission Street, between 3rd and 4th streets, across the street from Yerba Buena Gardens in the heart of the South of Market district.

== History ==
On June 9, 1851, the church held its very first mass in a hall on the corner of 4th and Jessie streets. A couple of months later a temporary church was built facing Market Street on the land where the Palace Hotel stands today. Inspired by the Irish population in the area, it was given the name of Ireland's patron saint, Saint Patrick. After the Civil War droves of people immigrated to San Francisco and the need for a bigger church grew. As a result, a new church facing Mission Street was constructed and opened in April 1870. It was dedicated by the then archbishop Joseph Alemany, O.P. Many described it as the most magnificent church west of Chicago.

During the 1906 San Francisco earthquake the church was completely destroyed. The foundation and parts of the walls were the only portions of the building that still stood. Since many were shaken up and were in despair, many of the parishioners left the church. In the meantime, masses were held in the sandlots on Folsom Street between 3rd and 4th streets. They also built a permanent shelter called Tir-Na-Og (Land of the Young) which would be later called St. Patrick's shelter. Those who remained constructed a new church, similar to the old church. It was desired for it to be the church for the Irish in the West Coast. The rebuild of the church included importing Ireland Caen stone and green translucent marble of Connemara, and Irish artist Mia Cranwill designed the main altar's metal crucifix.

The Irish designer, Kitty MacCormack of the Dublin-based Dun Emer Guild, was commissioned to design and create vestments for the Church in 1923.

In 1968, the church became a San Francisco landmark. Later on, as the redevelopment of the Yerba Buena area occurred, the church remained unchanged as its surroundings were transforming into a modern look into the new millennium.

The church has been home to many nationalities. Reflecting the population shifts of the South of Market neighborhood, the Irish has given way to the Spanish community, which then, in turn, gave way to the Filipino community. Today, Filipinos make up the majority of parishioners. It also caters to the business people and tourists in the area.

It regularly holds CCD and RCIA classes. It also has many devotions and novenas that have been influenced by the Filipino community. Masses are held daily and the church is open until 6:15 pm on weekdays and 6:45 pm on weekends.

== Architecture ==
The church features Gothic Revival architecture, with ribbed vaults, pointed arches, a central nave and two side aisles of lower height. The nave follows the basic Gothic pattern with a triforium and clerestory-like top tier.

Inspired by the national colors of Ireland, it features green Connemara marble (Verd antique, serpentine marble) and white and gold Bontticino marble. Decorating the church are Tiffany-style stained glass windows depicting the patron saints of Ireland's 32 counties.

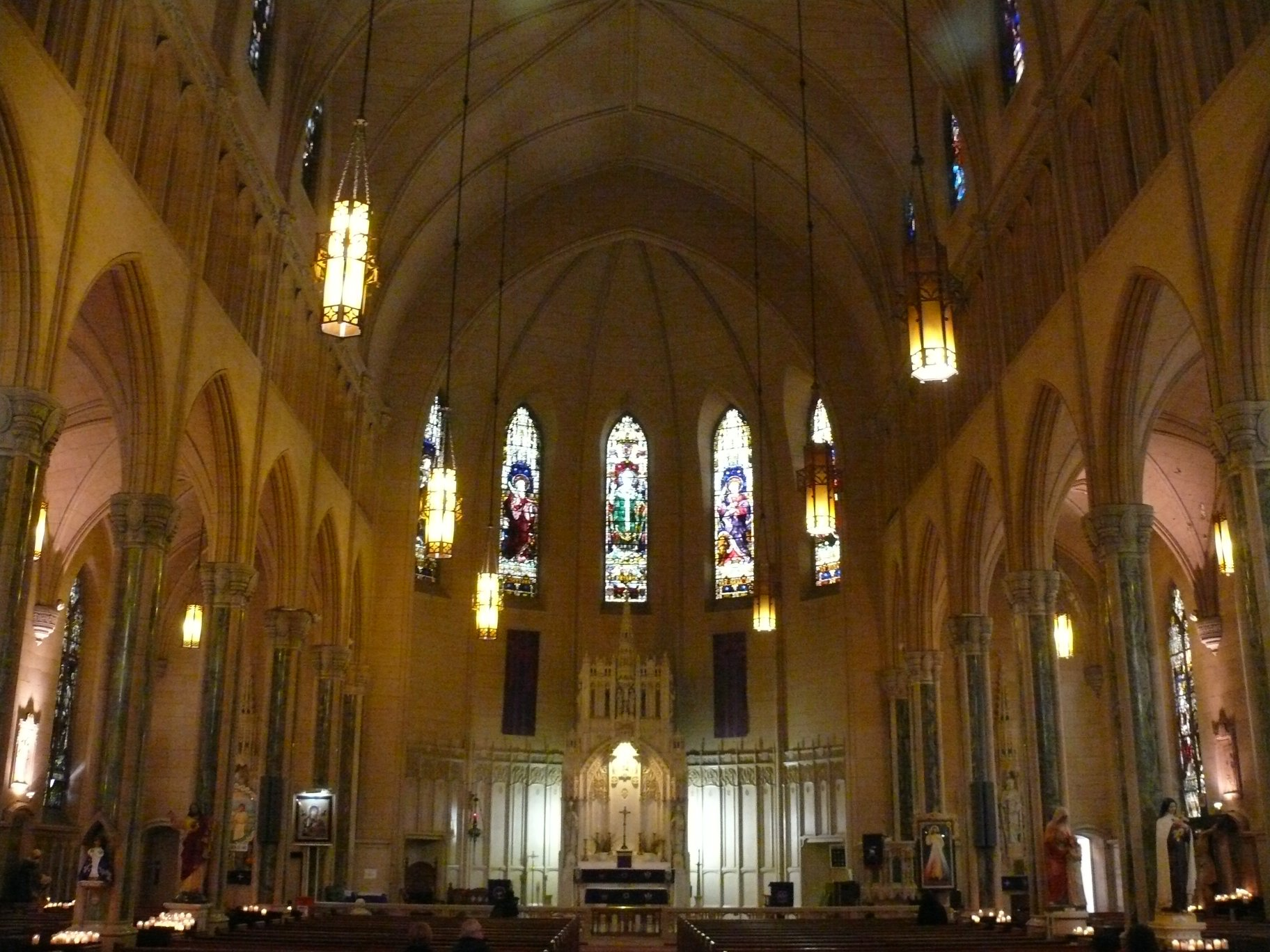
Interior dome in 2013

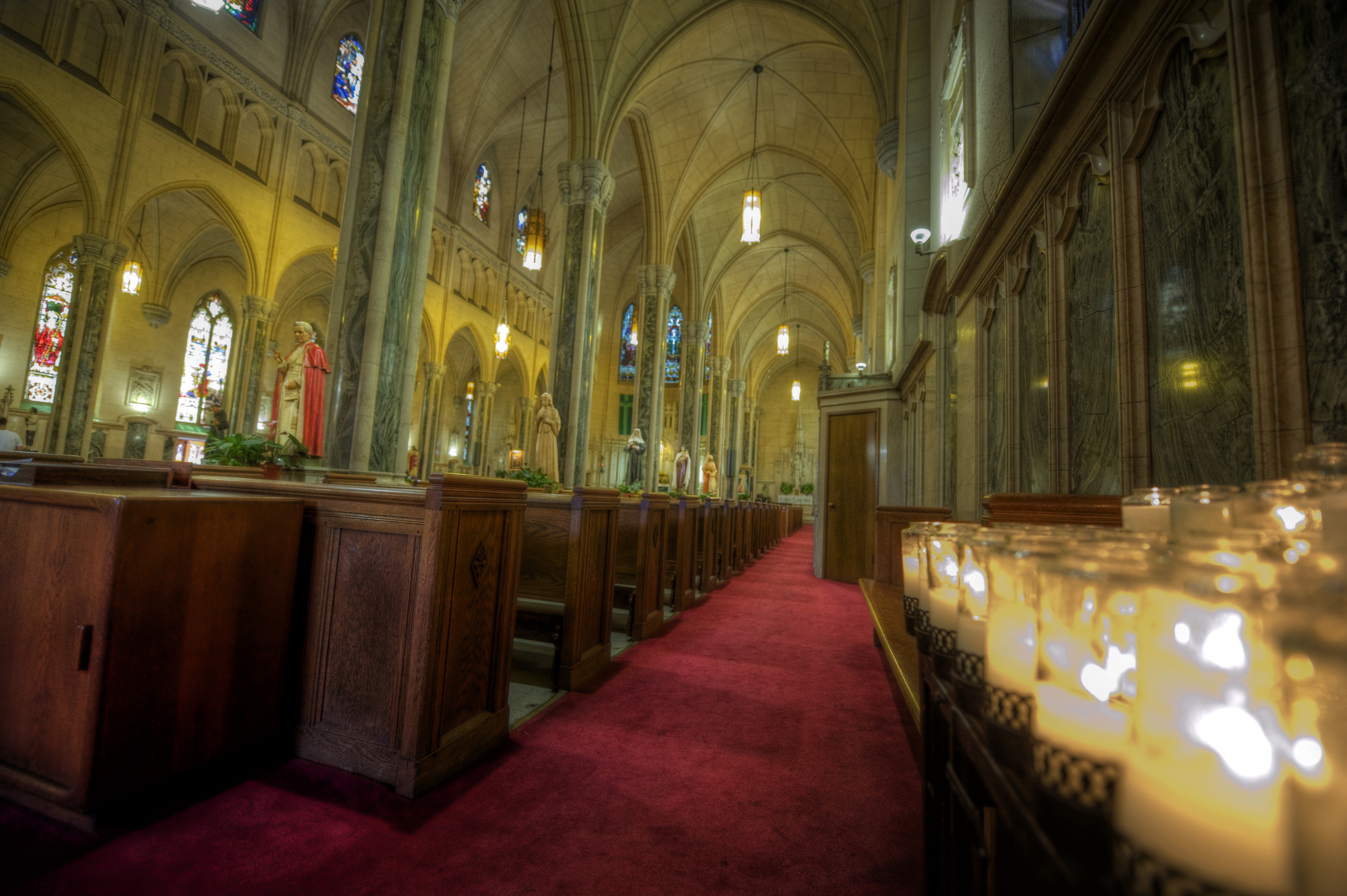
Interior of church in 2010

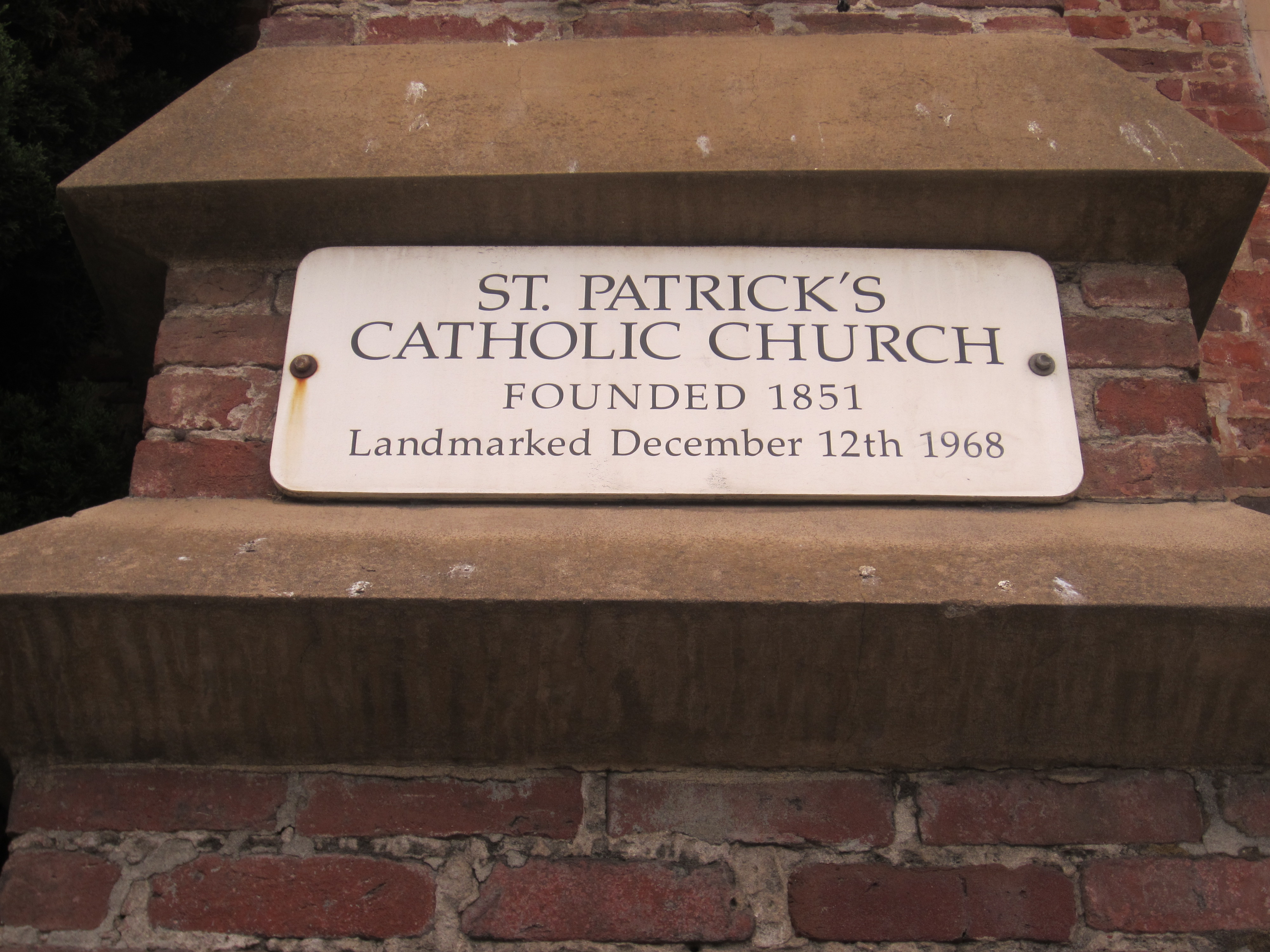
Exterior in 2013

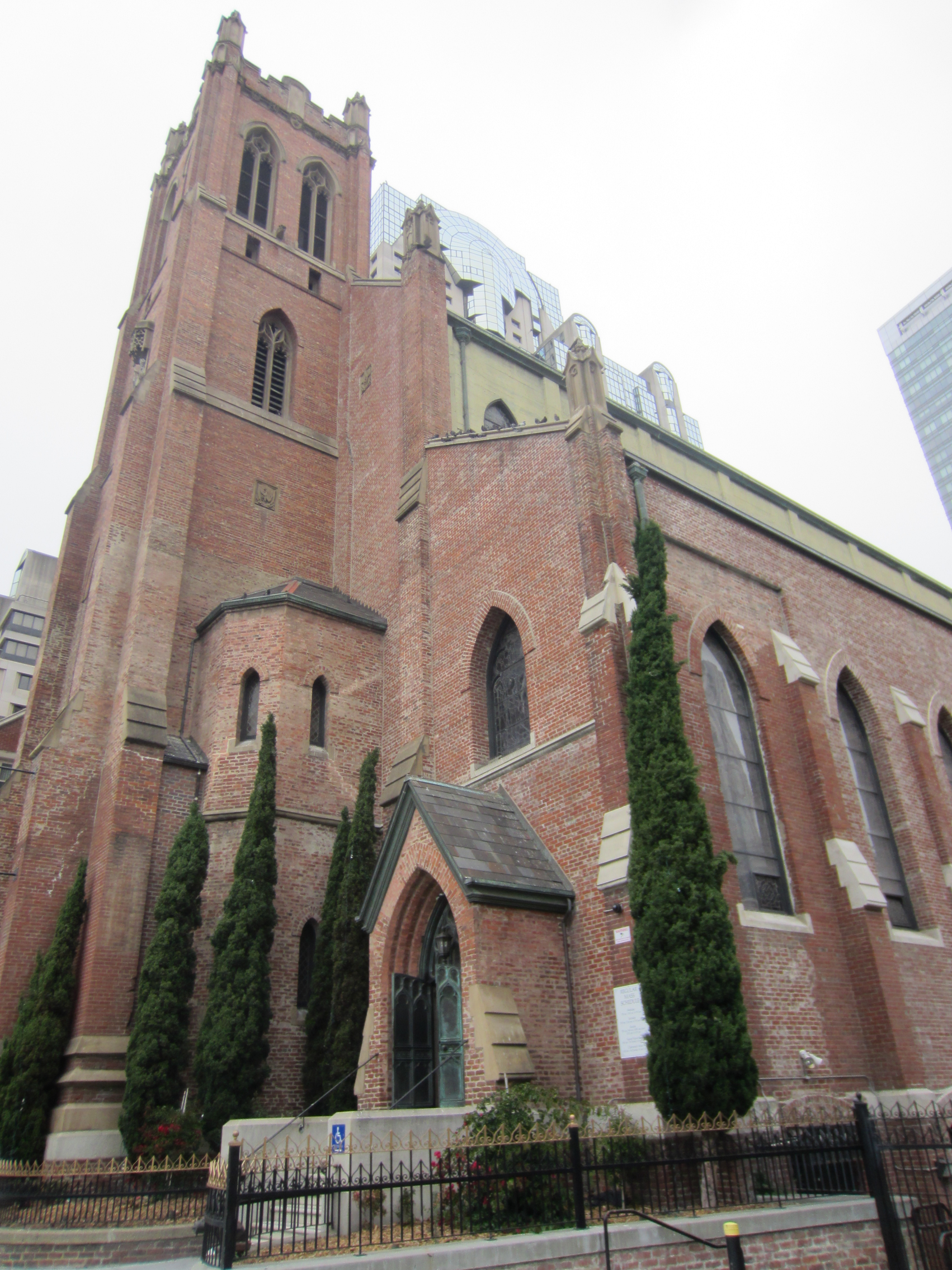
Side angle of the exterior in 2013

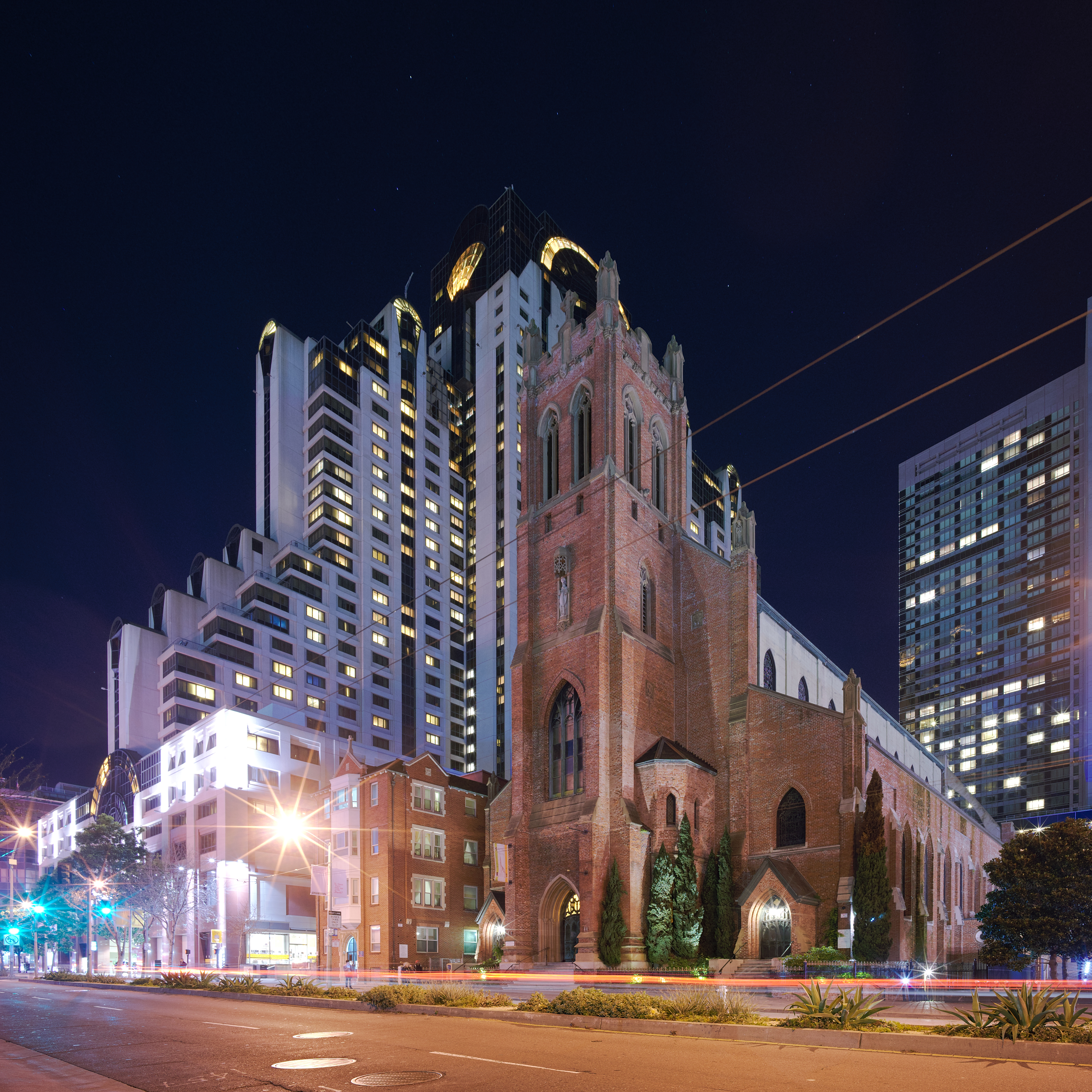
The church at night in 2017

== See also ==
- List of San Francisco Designated Landmarks
- Gothic Revival church buildings in California
- San Francisco County Parishes
