= Responsibilities and Other Poems =

William Butler Yeats work

Responsibilities and Other Poems is a work written by William Butler Yeats.

== Publication history ==
Responsibilities and a Play was printed and published by Yeats's sister, Elizabeth Corbet Yeats, at the Cuala Press in 1914. 400 copies were published.

The work contained thirty one poems and a new version of the play The Hour Glass, which was originally written in collaboration with Lady Gregory, but now presented in a new version.

Responsibilities and Other Poems was published by Macmillan in 1916. This trade edition contained one new poem “The Well and the Tree,” which was subsequently removed from the sequence to become part of the play, At the Hawk’s Well. This work also included some poems from the Green Helmet and Other Poems (1910) and the 1913 poems from Poems Written in Discouragement.

== Literary significance ==
Beginning in 1895 with Poems and in 1899 with The Wind among the Reeds, Yeats published poems typically with a dreamlike atmosphere and replete with reference to Irish folklore and legends. The Green Helmet (1910) contained little of the Celtic influence of his earlier poems. The other world had all but disappeared with his publication of Responsibilities and a Play.

The Responsibilities poems signify a transition turning point for Yeats from the dreamworld of the Celtic Twilight to the harsh realities of the modern day. He sums it up in "September 1913", written about the worker's strike in Dublin: "Romantic Ireland's dead and gone." Those realities included the attacks on Maude Gonne and himself by George Moore; the Hugh Lane controversy; the workers’ strike of 1913 and his support of the working man and James Connolly; Parnell; and the fuss over The Playboy of the Western World. The poems are political and personal. Responsibilities begins with Yeats’ obscure and anonymous epigraph attributed to “an old play”: “In dreams begins responsibility.” His next epigraph is from Confucius and refers to the Prince of Chang, the founder of the Second Dynasty, perhaps signifying a new dynasty for Yeats himself. These are announcements of a new direction for Yeats. His introductory matter continues with a poems referring to the Butler family, a veiled response to the criticisms of George Moore. The collection ends with a poem referring to with George Moore as a post passing dogs defile.
