= Elizabeth Yeats =

Irish educator and publisher (1868–1940)

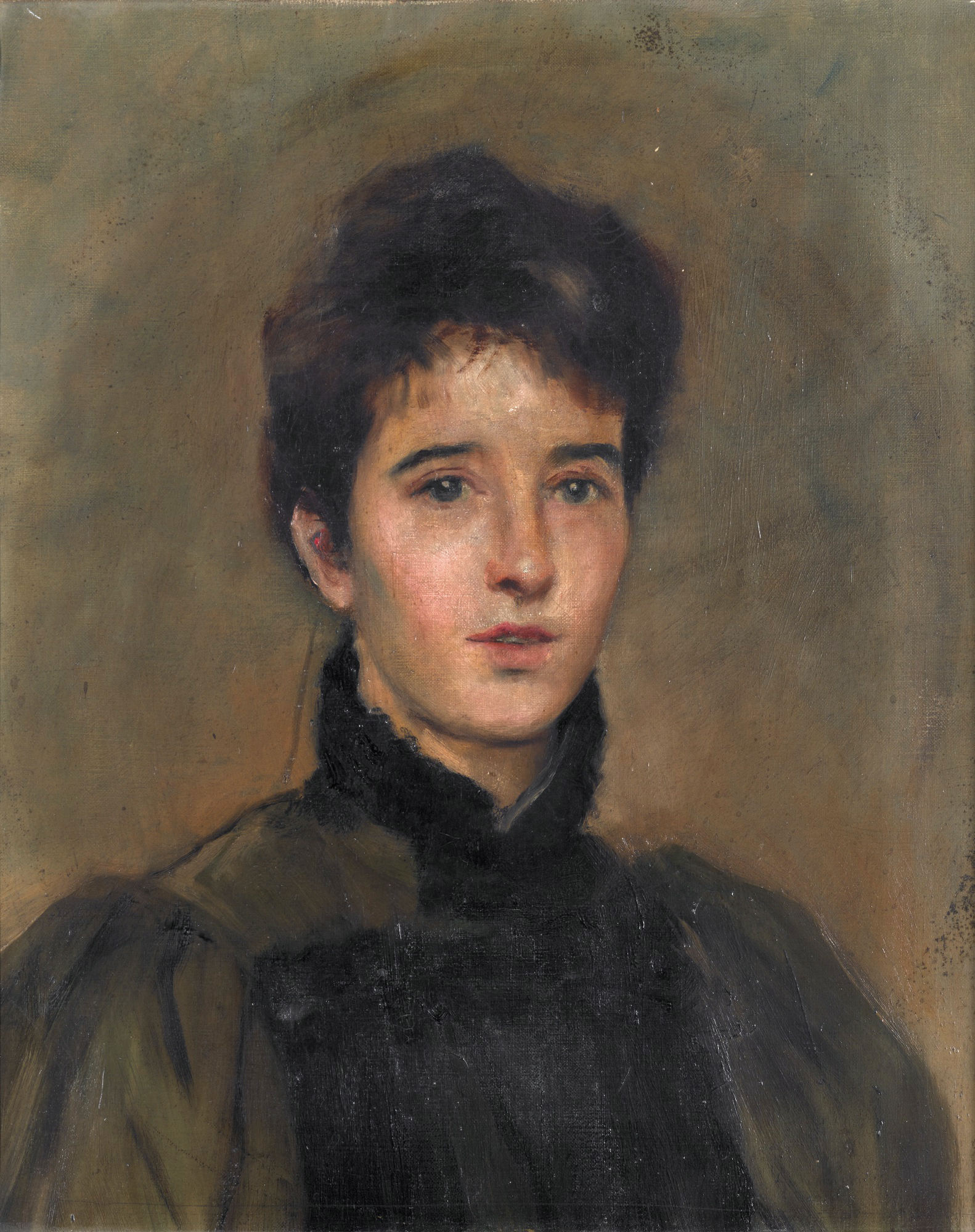
- 1887 portrait by John Butler Yeats
- Born: 11 March 1868; London, England
- Died: 16 January 1940 (aged 71); Dublin, Ireland
- Education: Dublin Metropolitan School of Art; Froebel College
- Occupations: Educator; Publisher
- Father: John Butler Yeats
- Relatives: W. B. Yeats (brother); Jack Butler Yeats (brother); Lily Yeats (sister)

Elizabeth Corbet Yeats (11 March 1868 – 16 January 1940), known as Lolly, was an Irish educator and publisher. She worked as an art teacher and published several books on art, and was a founder of Dun Emer Press, which published several works by her brother W. B. Yeats. She was the first commercial printer in Ireland to work exclusively with hand presses.

== Early life and education ==
Elizabeth Corbet Yeats was born at 23 Fitzroy Road, London. She was the daughter of the Irish artist John Butler Yeats and Susan Yeats (née Pollexfen). She was sister to W. B., Jack and Susan Mary "Lily" Yeats. From the age of four, Elizabeth lived in Merville, Sligo, at the home of her grandfather William Pollexfen. In November 1874, her family moved to 14 Edith Villas, West Kensington, London. Her governess was Martha Jowitt from 1876 until 1879, before the family moved to Bedford Park, Chiswick, in 1878.

Elizabeth Yeats returned to Howth, County Dublin, in 1881. She enrolled, with her sister Susan, in the Dublin Metropolitan School of Art in 1883 and took classes at the Royal Dublin Society.

The family moved to Eardley Crescent, South Kensington, London, in 1886. While there, Yeats started to write fiction and published a home-made magazine, The Pleiades, with six friends, contributing "Story without a plot" to the Christmas 1888 issue. In addition, she published "Scamp and three friends" in The Vegetarian.

Yeats also attended the Chiswick School of Art with her sister Susan and brother Jack Butler Yeats, learning "Freehand drawing in all its branches, practical Geometry and perspective, pottery and tile painting, design for decorative purposes".

In the 1890s, she lived at 3 Blenheim Road, Bedford Park, London, and trained as a kindergarten teacher at the Froebel College in Bedford, Bedfordshire. She undertook her teaching practice at the Bedford Park High School. In 1892, when her training was completed, she taught as a visiting art mistress at the Froebel Society, Chiswick High School and the Central Foundation School.

== Career ==
Lecturing and publication of four popular painting manuals – Brushwork (1896), Brushwork studies of flowers, fruits and animals (1898), Brushwork copy book (1899), and Elementary brushwork studies (1900) – earned Yeats a good income.

She trained and worked as an art teacher and was a member of William Morris's circle in London before her family returned to Dublin in 1900. Yeats wrote and created the artwork for Elementary Brush-Work Studies (published in 1900), an educational book that teaches young children the technique of painting flowers and plants using her simple method. At the suggestion of Emery Walker, who worked with Morris on the Kelmscott Press, Yeats studied printing with the Women's Printing Society in London.

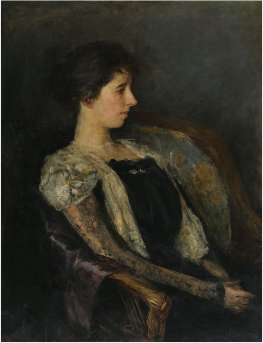
by Jack Butler Yeats, circa 1899

In Dublin, she accepted the invitation to join Evelyn Gleeson to form the Dun Emer Guild along with Lily, who was an embroiderer. "The name Dun Emer (Fort of Emer) was named for the Lady Emer, wife of the hero Cúchulainn, renowned in Irish folklore for her beauty and artistic skills." Yeats managed the Dun Emer Press from 1902 with a printing press acquired from a provincial newspaper. The Press was located at Runnymede, the house of Evelyn Gleeson. (This house, located in Dundrum, was later renamed Dun Emer. It has since been demolished.) This was set up with the intention of training young women in bookbinding and printing as well as embroidery and weaving. In 1903, Yeats started printing and Dun Emer's first book was W. B. Yeats's In the seven woods (1903).

Despite being a gifted printer, the costings exceeded the quality of work that Yeats produced with the result that the press (like the guild) was often at risk financially. Eleven books, decorated with pastels by George William Russell, appeared under the Dun Emer imprint produced from a first-floor room. Yeats had several disagreements with her brother William over his directions as literary editor. She also disliked Evelyn Gleeson. In October 1906 she travelled to New York to advertise her products but published Dun Emer's last book William's Discoveries (1907) in late November when she returned to Dublin.

After many years of strained relations between the Yeats sisters and Evelyn Gleeson, their business relationship was finally ended. Subsequently, in 1908, Lolly and her brother William started the Cuala Press, publishing over 70 books including 48 by the poet. Yeats managed the press while her sister Lily controlled the embroidery section. Cuala continued to be a family strain. Their father, John Butler Yeats, had to castigate his son William for sending overtly critical letters to his sisters about the press. However, Cuala produced magnificent books: W. B. Yeats' The Green Helmet and Other Poems (1910) and a series of Broadsides (published 1908–15, with illustrations from Jack Yeats).

Yeats was the first commercial printer in Ireland to work exclusively with hand presses.

She worked with Cuala Press until short of her death on 16 January 1940, after a diagnosis of high blood pressure and heart trouble. Her death was reported in the United States a month later.

== Legacy ==
The Cuala Press produced handcrafted books, cards and prints. An academic project at the Irish Art Research Centre, Trinity College Dublin is putting images from some of the prints online. The role of the press, which only employed women, in supporting women's rights, and also a new national identity and confidence after the 1921 independence of Ireland from Britain, is now understood. The prints, which sold widely in the UK, USA and Ireland, and which were radical at that time, showed, counter to the prevailing stereotypes of the time, a fresh view of Ireland as prosperous and with strong rural traditions.

== See also ==
- Responsibilities and Other Poems
