= Mary Galway Houston =

Mary Houston
- Born: 27 July 1871; Coleraine, County Londonderry, Ireland
- Died: 24 April 1962 (aged 90); Coleraine, County Londonderry, Northern Ireland
- Resting place: Coleraine cemetery
- Education: Dublin Metropolitan School of Art
- Known for: metal and leather working

Mary Galway Houston (27 July 1871 – 24 April 1962) was an Irish craftswoman, teacher, and author. She was known for her leather work and repoussé metalwork, and for her writings on the history of costume and costume design.

== Early life and education ==
Mary Galway Houston was born 27 July 1871 at Coleraine Academical Institution, Coleraine, County Londonderry. She was the daughter of Thomas Galway Houston, headmaster of Coleraine Academical Institution, and Maud Steen Houston (née Millar). She attended the Dublin Metropolitan School of Art, winning a number of prizes in final year. She exhibited leather work, repoussé metalwork, lace and crochet designs as well as drawings at the Royal Dublin Society (1894-1896) and at the first exhibition of the Arts and Crafts Society of Ireland in 1895. She entered the Royal College of Art in London in 1896, regularly exhibiting with the English Arts and Crafts Society and the Royal Academy of Arts from 1901. During this time, she entered numerous national competitions, with her submissions often used as illustrations in art magazines. Houston was a gold medallist for the 1898 competition to design the modelled leather cover for the Kelmscott Chaucer.

== Artistic career ==
Houston became increasingly lauded for the leather work, exhibiting leather bookbindings and embossed-and-modelled leather panels from 1898 to 1903. She wrote an article on embossed and chased leatherwork in the Art Workers' Quarterly (1903) which was illustrated with her set of four relief panels scenes from Homer. Houston also undertook work in other media including needlework, and working silver, copper, and tin in repoussé metalwork. At the 1899 English Arts and Crafts Society exhibition she exhibited an art-nouveau silver mirror-back, and at the 1900 Paris exhibition with a three-piece toilet in beaten silver. All of her early work is predominantly in Art Nouveau, with her moving to a more Celtic style from around 1900. These Celtic designs drew on Irish myth and legend, drawing on ancient Celtic and medieval Irish prototypes.

In 1900 The Studio magazine commissioned her to create two silver cups to accompany an article calling for the improvement of the design of sporting trophies and sups. This was her first attempt at metal working in the round, and she drew inspiration from the Dunvegan Cup and Methers, an ancient three-handled vessel. Though she was based in London, Houston continued to exhibit at the RDS and the annual exhibitions of the Irish Decorative Art Association. In 1903, she designed a tapestry panel of A voyage to Tir-na-noge for the Dun Emer Guild, and in 1904 created a tooled leather album cover which was presented to James Brenan upon his retirement. From 1903, Houston taught at the Camberwell School of Art in London.

== Writing ==
Houston developed an interest in the history of dress and costume design and went on to publish A technical history of costume in three volumes: Ancient Egyptian, Assyrian, and Persian costumes and decorations (1920, co-authored with Florence S. Hornblower), Ancient Greek, Roman, and Byzantine costume and decoration, including Cretan costume (1931), and Medieval costume in England and France: the 13th, 14th, and 15th centuries (1939).

== Published books ==
- Ancient Egyptian, Assyrian, and Persian costumes and decorations (1920)
- Ancient Greek, Roman and Byzantine costume and decoration (1931)
- Medieval costume in England & France, the 13th, and 14th and 15th centuries (1939)
- Ancient Egyptian, Mesopotamian & Persian costume and decoration (1954)

== Later life ==
Towards the end of her life, Houston rarely exhibited. Her final publication was in 1954, with a second edition of the revised and retitled Ancient Egyptian, Mesopotamian, and Persian costume. It is believed she moved back to Ireland some time after this point. Houston's exact death date and place of death are generally stated to be unknown, but she appears to have died in Coleraine on 24 April 1962.
