= National Museum of Ireland – Decorative Arts and History =

Museum division in Dublin, Ireland

National Museum of Ireland – Decorative Arts & History
- Ard-Mhúsaem na hÉireann – Na hEalaíona Maisiúla ⁊ Stair
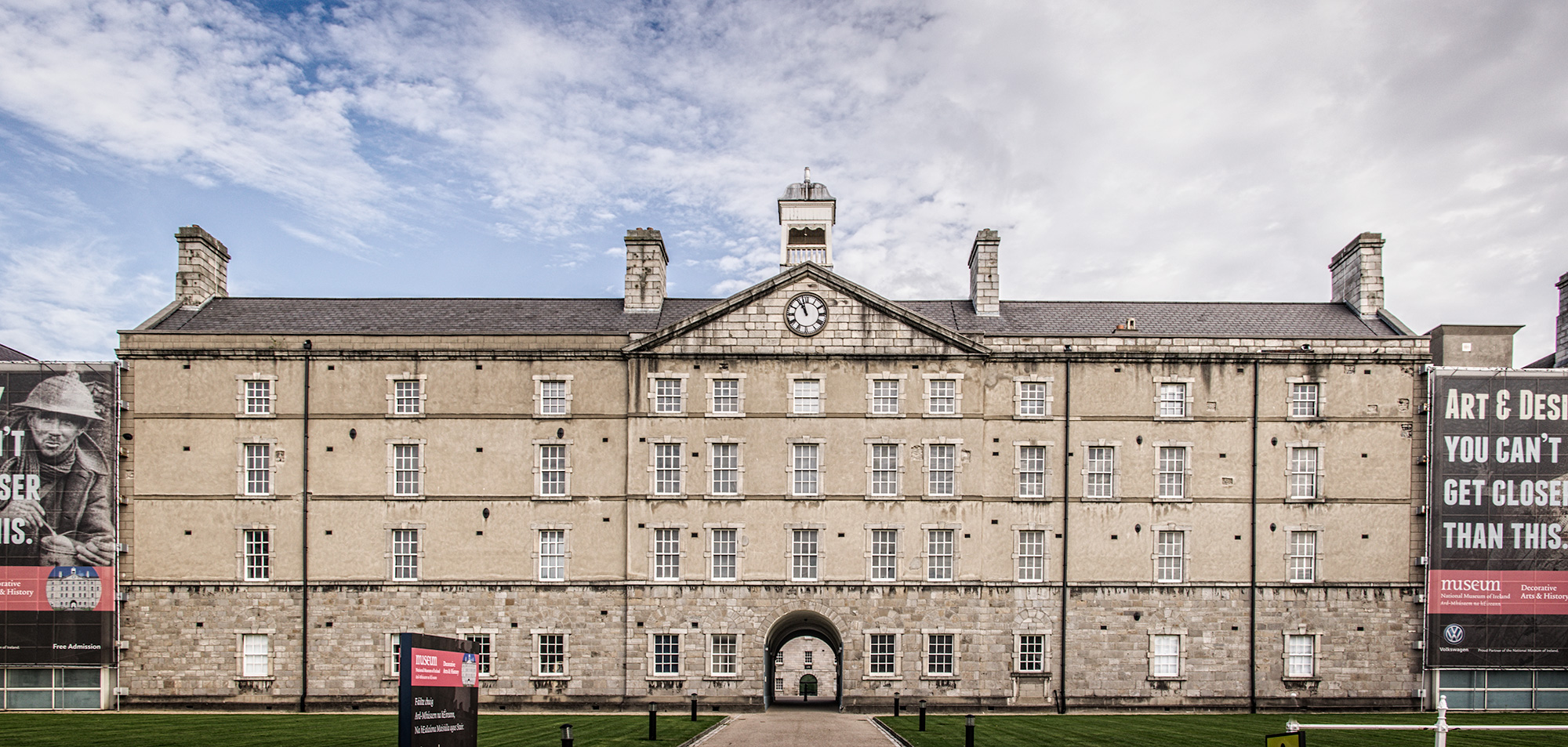
- Front facade of Collins Barracks

- Location of the museum in Dublin
- Established: 18 September 1997
- Location: Collins Barracks, Benburb Street, Dublin, Ireland
- Coordinates: 53°20′54″N 6°17′09″W
- Type: National museum
- Collection size: 150,000 items
- Visitors: 198,974 (2018)
- Public transit access: Museum Luas stop Dublin Bus routes: 25, 25a, 66, 67
- Website: www.museum.ie/en/intro/arts-and-history.aspx

National Museum of Ireland network
- Archaeology; Decorative Arts & History; Country Life; Natural History

The National Museum of Ireland – Decorative Arts and History (Irish: Ard-Mhúsaem na hÉireann – Na hEalaíona Maisiúla ⁊ Stair), also known as the National Museum of Ireland – Collins Barracks is a branch of the National Museum of Ireland (NMI) located at the former Collins Barracks in the Arbour Hill area of Dublin, Ireland.

This museum holds historical and contemporary collections relating to military history and decorative arts, with core collections relating to historical Irish events such as the Easter Rising.

== History ==
=== 1877–1922 ===
The Decorative Arts & History Department of the NMI, formerly called the Art and Industrial Division of the Dublin Museum of Science and Art, was founded in 1877, alongside the Natural History Division, and the Antiquities Division. Early objects for this division were purchased in 1878 and 1879, when 121 Indian and Persian objects, including enamels, ceramics, and textiles were added to the collections which came from the Royal Dublin Society and the Museum of Irish Industry. Material was also loaned from what was then the South Kensington Museum (now the V&A) in London. When the new museum building on Kildare Street was opened, art and industry were featured in the displays, in a similar manner to the South Kensington Museum. The art and industry collections were deemed essential teaching material for the instruction of art students, as well as those working in industry, to learn from the best international example. By 1889, the Art and Industrial Division had accessioned 10,372 objects that were stored at the museum's main building on Kildare Street. In this early phase of the museum, the industrial collections were given prominence both for display in Kildare Street, and in collections acquisition. Large sections of the ground floor at Kildare Street were given over to displays of antiquities deemed useful for Irish industry.

In the early 20th century, the art and industry collection was primarily used for teaching and instruction on a range of arts and crafts disciplines. Material was often loaned to the Dublin Metropolitan School of Art, and some of the collection was sent around the country to schools and other institutions in loan boxes, being known as the Circulation Collection. This collection was highly successful, but was put on hiatus during World War I; it was never reinstated after the war. The museum mounted an exhibition called Applications of Art and Industry, which displayed locally commissioned enamel work, lace, and tapestries. Exhibition materials of silver and furniture were loaned out, and lectures given to people employed in these industries. From 1908, under the new directorship of Count George Noble Plunkett, there was an increased emphasis on collecting objects that were "distinctively Irish" across all the museum's divisions.

=== 1922–1988 ===
After Irish independence in 1922, the museum as a whole, now known as the National Museum of Ireland, had to operate on a much-reduced budget, and lost a large part of its exhibition spaces when Leinster House became the seat of the new Irish parliament. It was from this point on that the art and industry division was tasked with collecting objects relating to Irish military and political history. The museum mounted its first exhibition on the Easter Rising in 1932 in Kildare Street, with objects that would form the centre of what would become known as the Easter Week Collection. This was the museum's first contemporary and thematic collection, and this remained an active area of collecting for a large part of the 20th century. Many of the objects in the collection were donated or loaned by members of the public.

The 1930s saw the donation of a large and important collection of Asian art by Dublin-born Albert Bender of San Francisco. Bender, who was Jewish, donated the collection to the National Museum of Ireland during the tenure of curator and director Adolf Mahr, who was also the head of the Dublin Nazi chapter. The collection was sought after by a number of other cultural institutions, including the Louvre, but Bender gave the NMI first refusal on it. This was despite the changed remit of the museum under the new Irish Free State, with an aim to concentrate its collecting and interpretation of Irish material culture, and Mahr's attempts to dissuade Bender from donating to the Irish museum, stating: "We are not good enough an institution to be favoured with such magnificent gifts ... why shall we go to the trouble to force such a fine Far East collection ... upon a country which is not yet mature for it?" Despite this, Bender donated elements of his collection from 1932 to 1937 in honour of his mother, Augusta Bender, to whom the exhibition room in Kildare Street was dedicated. The "Augusta Bender Memorial Room of Far Eastern Art" was opened by Eamon de Valera on 25 June 1934, with de Valera delivering a speech written by Mahr. The event was attended by members of the Yeats family and the artist Estella Solomons. Bender eventually stopped sending further objects to the museum when the room, to which he had donated over 250 items, was reported to him as full by Mahr in 1937.

=== 1988–present ===
In December 1988, the Irish government made the decision to close Collins Barracks as a military facility, and in 1993 an agreement was reached for the NMI to take possession of the site as a new museum campus. This was part of a wider plan to rejuvenate a neglected and deprived area of Dublin city spanning 270 acres between Collins Barracks and O'Connell Street. This area was designated as part of the Historic Area Rejuvenation Project (HARP), with the museum being the central piece of a new "museum quarter". Included in this plan was the construction of the new Luas line which would create easier public transport links to not only the new museum in Collins Barracks, but to the Irish Museum of Modern Art in Kilmainham.

Over the course of three years, the Office of Public Works developed and refurbished the site for the museum at the cost of £15 million. The development of this new museum site led to the drafting of the NMI's first strategic plan. The museum opened in 1997, with both exhibition and storage spaces for the collections that were relocated from Kildare Street and other storage buildings. This resulted in the display of some objects for the first time in decades. A lecture theatre, restaurant, and education rooms were also created. The site also is the location of the museum's conservation lab, and main offices for the documentation department. In the first year of opening, the museums saw 200,000 visitors. The opening of this new museum site also saw a marked expansion in the educational department of the museum across all of its sites. The museum was officially opened in its first phase in September 1997 by Minister for Arts, Heritage, Gaeltacht and the Islands, Síle de Valera.

The adaptation and development of the museum has led to a number of phased building projects. These included a collaboration between the Office of Public Works and the Gilroy McMahon architectural firm to redevelop the western and southern ranges of the main Palatine Square into exhibition spaces for the museum, and for which they were awarded the Royal Institute of the Architects of Ireland silver medal for conservation in 2002. This involved converting former infantry quarters into long exhibition areas, retaining the original staircases. The museum's conservation department is housed in a red brick extension to the original buildings of the Transport Square, and was completed in 2001. In 2018, visitor numbers were reported as 198,974.

In March 2021, a pair of slippers held in the museum's collections went viral. A screen shot of curator Brenda Malone holding the slippers as she showed them to a group of students from Liverpool John Moores University was shared on Twitter by author and lecturer, Dr Gillian O'Brien. The slippers were owned by Michael Collins, and were donated to the museum by his friend, Bridget O'Connor, in 1958. The bright blue slippers with an embroidered wolf head pattern inspired a large volume of interest. The slippers have never been on public display, but there are now plans to create a range of gift items based on them.

== Permanent exhibitions ==
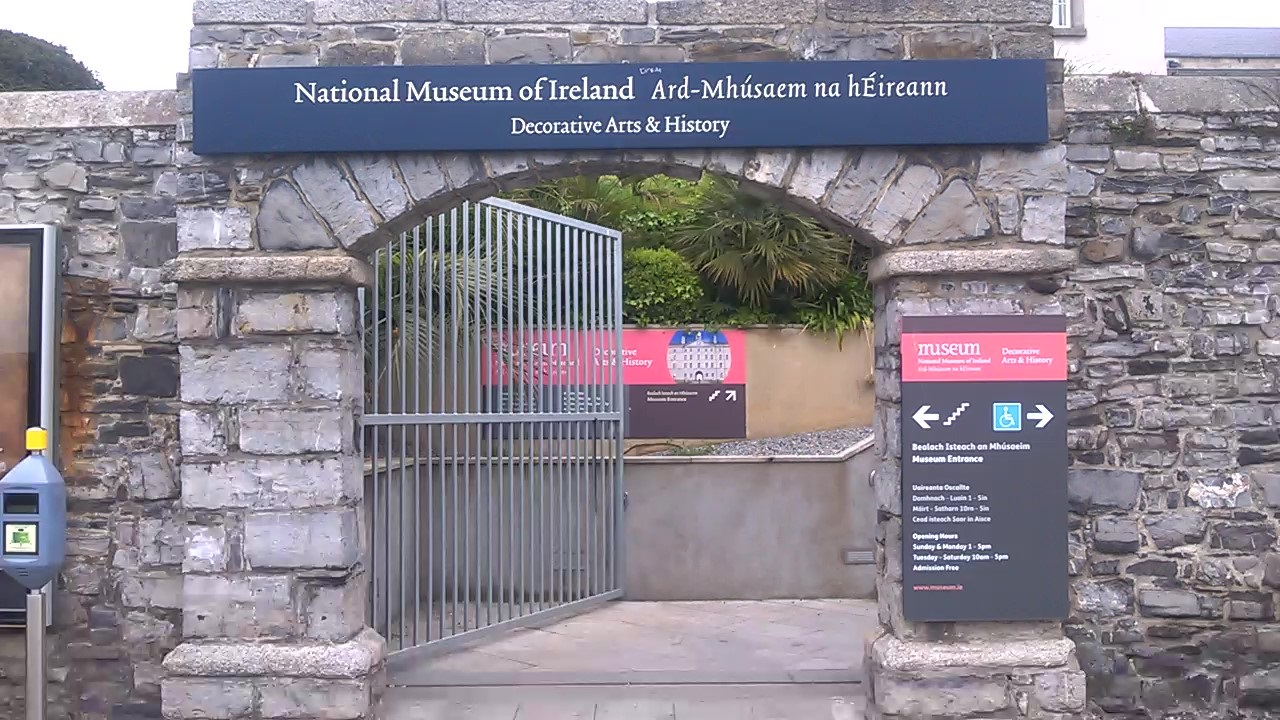
Main entrance to the museum

The museum contains displays of Irish coins and currency, silverware, furniture, Asian art, folk life and costumes, ceramics, and glassware. Other permanent exhibitions include What's In Store?, Out of Storage, Irish Silver Exhibition, and Irish Country Furniture.

In 2021, it was announced that a new gallery dedicated to the 20th century would be opened at the museum. Scheduled to open in 2023, it would coincide with the centenary of the foundation of the Irish Free State as part of the Decade of Centenaries 2012–2023 Programme. The government announced the museum would receive €2.2 million in capital funding for the project.

=== Soldiers and Chiefs ===
The Soldiers and Chiefs – The Irish at War at Home and Abroad since 1550 exhibition features military artefacts and memorabilia tracing Ireland's military history from 1550 to the present. It opened to the public in 2005, and spans over 1,700 square metres of exhibition space. The exhibition is organised chronologically, with the phases of military occupation and development in Ireland covered, as well as the role of Irish soldiers in armies around the world up to modern-day peace-keeping activities with the United Nations. Curated by Lar Joye, it won best exhibition in Ireland 2009–2010 in the museum awards hosted by the Heritage Council and the Northern Ireland Museums Council.

One of the exhibits, The Stokes Tapestry, was featured among A History of Ireland in 100 Objects in 2017. The hat that Michael Collins was wearing when he was fatally shot was part of a previous exhibition entitled Road to Independence in Kildare Street from 1991 to 2005. It was removed from display in 2005, in line with the museum's policy on the display of human remains due to the presence of brain matter and blood inside the hat as well as conservation issues with the long-term display. The coat that Collins was wearing the day he died is still on display in the museum.

Further exhibition galleries dedicated to Irish military history have been created, many commemorating the centenaries of World War I, the Easter Rising, the Irish War of Independence, and the Irish Civil War. One exhibition is dedicated to the Royal Dublin and Royal Munster Fusiliers who fought at Gallipoli in 1915, while a later gallery opened in 2017 documents the Irish who fought at Messines, the 36th (Ulster) and 16th (Irish) Divisions.

=== Proclaiming a Republic: The 1916 Rising ===
This exhibition on the events of the 1916 Easter Rising was opened to coincide with the centenary of the events in 2016. It draws on the museum's Easter Week Collection, a collection of over 15,000 objects relating to the events of the Rising and the period immediately after. It was opened to the public on 3 March 2016 by Taoiseach Enda Kenny.

The exhibition opened in 2016 was the museum's eighth exhibition on the subject of the Easter Rising, and featured a number of objects which had not been put on public display before. The current exhibition is laid out over 10 zones, which track the events of the Easter Rising semi-chronologically, as well as reflecting on its continuing legacy. A number of objects directly relating to the execution of the leaders of the Rising were exhibited, including the blood-stained shirt of James Connolly.

=== The Way We Wore ===
This exhibition, which is subtitled 250 Years of Irish Clothing and Jewellery, was one of the inaugural exhibitions of the museum at its opening in 1997. It features clothing and jewellery manufactured in Ireland from the previous 250 years from the 1760s to the 1960s. The initial exhibition was expanded further in 2000, and it was the largest and most expensive exhibition of historical costume in Ireland when it opened. It cost £750,000 to mount the exhibition over 300 square meters across 3 galleries, and drew on the museum's collection as well as a number of loan objects from museums such as the Ulster Museum. The keeper of the Art and Industry Division, Mairead Dunleavy, oversaw the work. It was opened by Síle de Valera, Minister for Arts and Heritage, and her counterpart in Northern Ireland, Michael McGimpsey, and was the first exhibition of its kind in the museum for over 100 years.

The exhibition is dominated by the clothing of wealthier sections of Irish society historically, as those tended to be the clothes that were preserved. The exhibition also includes outfits worn by the spouses of Irish presidents, including Sinead de Valera, Rita Childers and Maeve Hillery. The exhibition is mounted using single or small groups of simple mannequins with the stories of the individual outfits described alongside. As well as military outfits and formal dresses, it also features a Celtic Revival dress from the early 20th century by Kitty MacCormack, and pleated linen gown by Sybil Connolly.

=== Eileen Gray ===
In 2000, the museum purchased a large collection of works from the designer and architect Eileen Gray at a cost of £900,000, outbidding the Pompidou Centre, Paris. The items were part of Gray's personal collection, from her apartment in Paris, and included personal objects, furniture, and models. These were placed on permanent display, curated by Dr Jennifer Goff, opening on 22 March 2002. It features a number of her most recognisable furniture designs, and its opening was marked with a conference dedicated to her.

=== Curator's Choice ===
The Curator's Choice exhibition features 25 objects selected by curators from across the museum's four divisions. Artefacts exhibited include King William's gauntlets that he wore at the Battle of the Boyne, a pocket book belonging to Wolfe Tone while he was imprisoned in the Barracks, and an oar and life belt salvaged from the RMS Lusitania. One of the most notable pieces in this exhibit is a Chinese porcelain vase from about 1300 AD, known as the Fonthill Vase.

=== A Dubliner's Collection of Asian Art: The Albert Bender Exhibition ===
The exhibition of the collection of Albert Bender was remounted at Collins Barracks in 2008, a collection which had been previously displayed at the museum in Kildare Street from the 1930s to 1973. Bender was an Irish-born Jew who had emigrated to San Francisco, where he amassed a large fortune from his work in insurance. The modern remounting of this exhibition displays a selection from the 260 objects of Asian art Bender donated, with one of the most important set of objects being the set of rare thangkas, or Buddhist tapestries from 18th-century Tibet. There is also a large display of Japanese woodblock prints, Chinese metalwork, and numerous religious figures. The new exhibition was curated by Dr Audrey Whitty, and a conference on the collections was convened in November 2008.

== Temporary exhibitions ==
Special temporary exhibitions are mounted regularly in the former Riding School, which is behind the western side of the Palatine Square, behind the reception area and museum shop. It was opened in 2005. In summer 2007 replicas of six Irish High Crosses that were subsequently shown internationally. In 2019, a temporary exhibition of 100 photographs of Ireland in the 1950s from the collection of Henri Cartier-Bresson was put on display titled Ireland in Focus: Photographing Ireland in the 1950s.

=== Dead Zoo at Large ===
In 2009 and 2010, a temporary exhibition of specimens from the Natural History Division of the museum was opened at the Riding School. The exhibition took place while the main Natural History museum on Merrion Street was closed for refurbishment.

=== (A)Dressing Our Hidden Truths ===
In March 2019, the museum mounted the exhibition curated by artist Alison Lowry and curator Dr Audrey Whitty entitled (A)Dressing Our Hidden Truths. It explores themes of institutional abuse, reflecting on the experiences of those who spent time in Magdalene Laundries, Mother and Baby Homes, and the industrial school system in Ireland. It received an "Honourable Mention" from the Annual Global Fine Arts Awards 2019 and nominated for the Global Humanity category in the same awards. Artists featured include Connie Roberts, Úna Burke, and Jayne Cherry. The exhibition was due to run until May 2020, and in January 2021 the museum announced it would acquire the glass piece by Lowry from the exhibition, A New Skin, along with a number of her other works.

== Contemporary collections ==
The museum began a programme of rapid response or contemporary collecting in the mid-2010s in response a number of seminal events in Irish culture, the first of which centred around the referendum on marriage equality in 2015. Under the direction of the curator Brenda Malone, the museum collected ephemera relating to the political campaigns. This included the campaign materials for the referendum on the constitutional ban on abortion in Ireland in 2018. Malone started collecting political posters the morning after the vote, as well as putting a call out on social media for members of the public to donate items relating to the campaign, on both sides, to the museum using the hashtags #Archivingthe8th and #Collectingthe8th alongside other cultural institutions in Ireland. As Malone has noted, it was more difficult to collect items from the "no" side in the referendum despite attempts to solicit more donations.

As part of the collection relating to marriage equality government minister, Katherine Zappone, donated her wedding dress to the museum in 2018. In 2019, Rory O'Neill known by his drag performance name, Panti Bliss, donated the dress he wore on the night of his speech at the Abbey Theatre about homophobia in 2014 as part of their "Noble Call" series. Overall, this work led to the museum adopting a formal Contemporary Collecting policy in 2019.

== Gallery ==
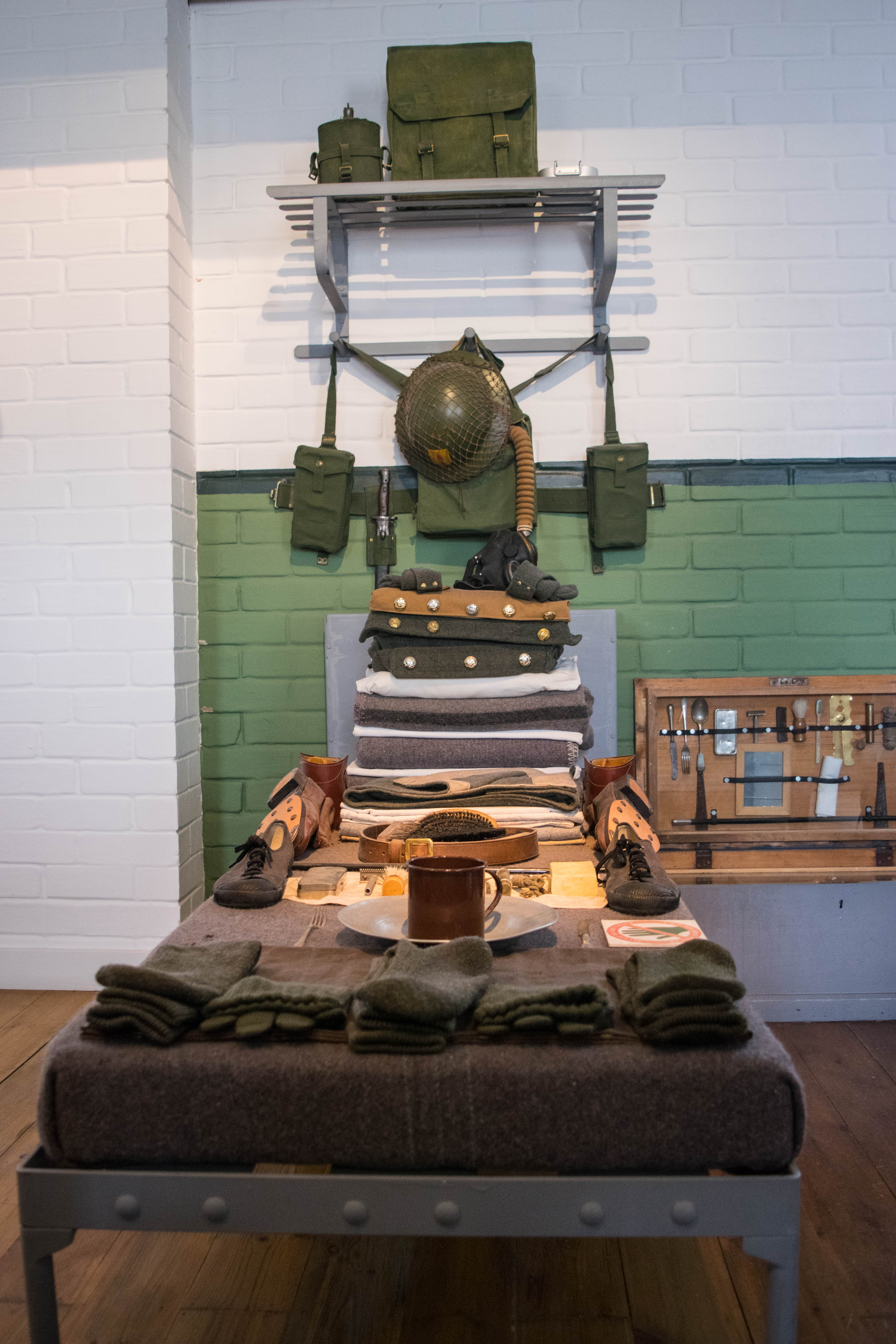
Exhibit of military history objects

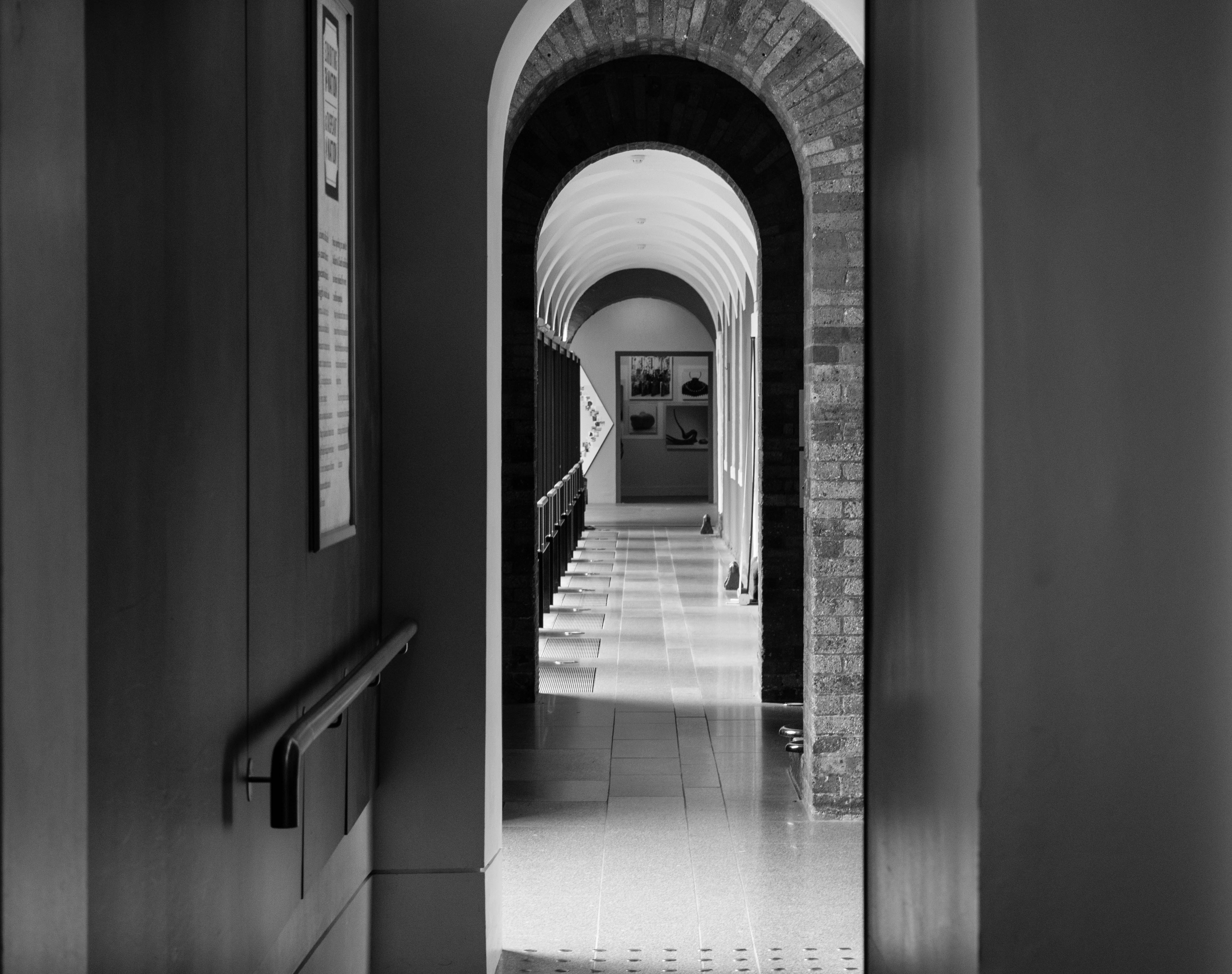
Museum corridor

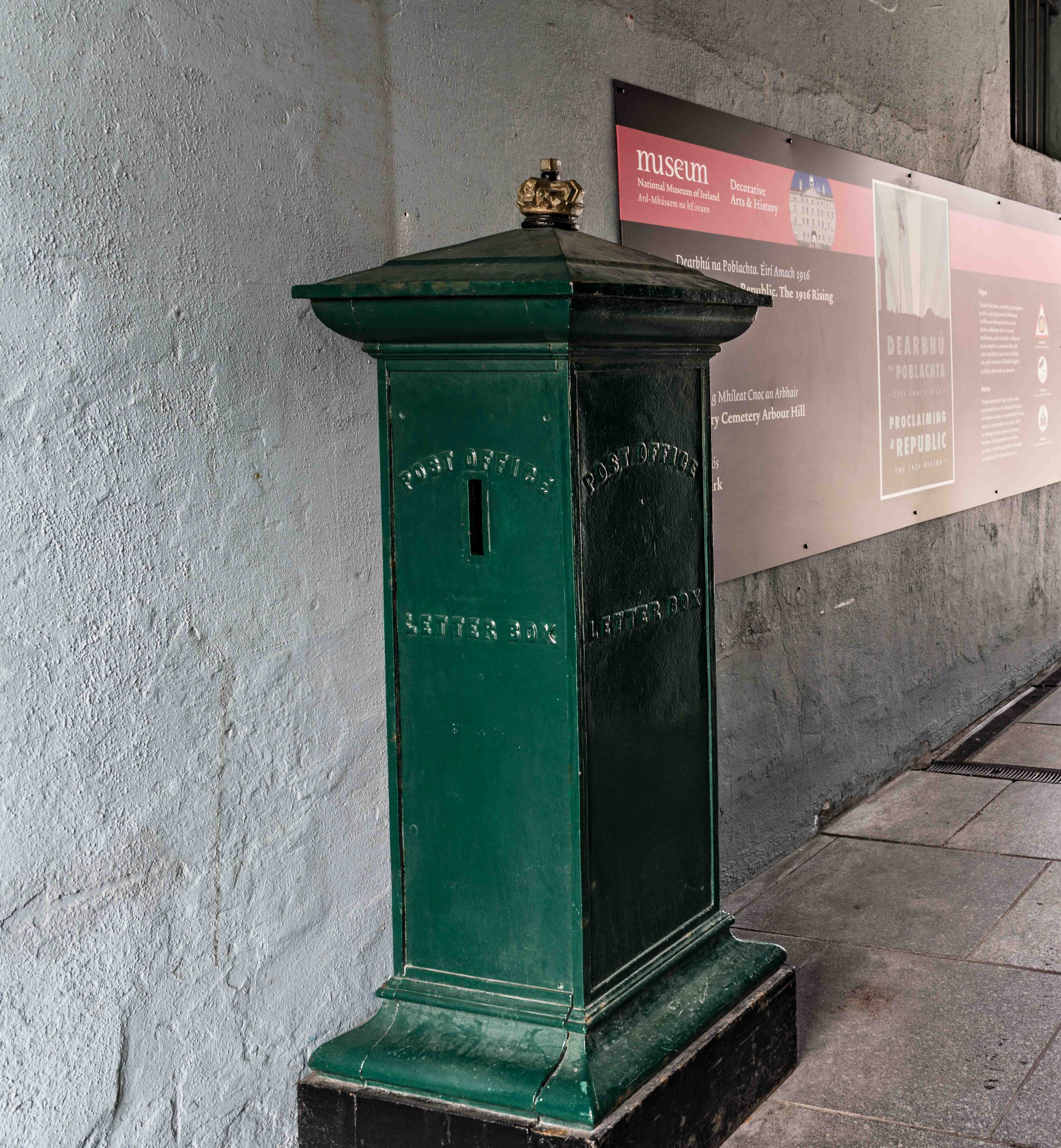
The only extant Ashworth pillar box and oldest in Ireland introduced by Anthony Trollope

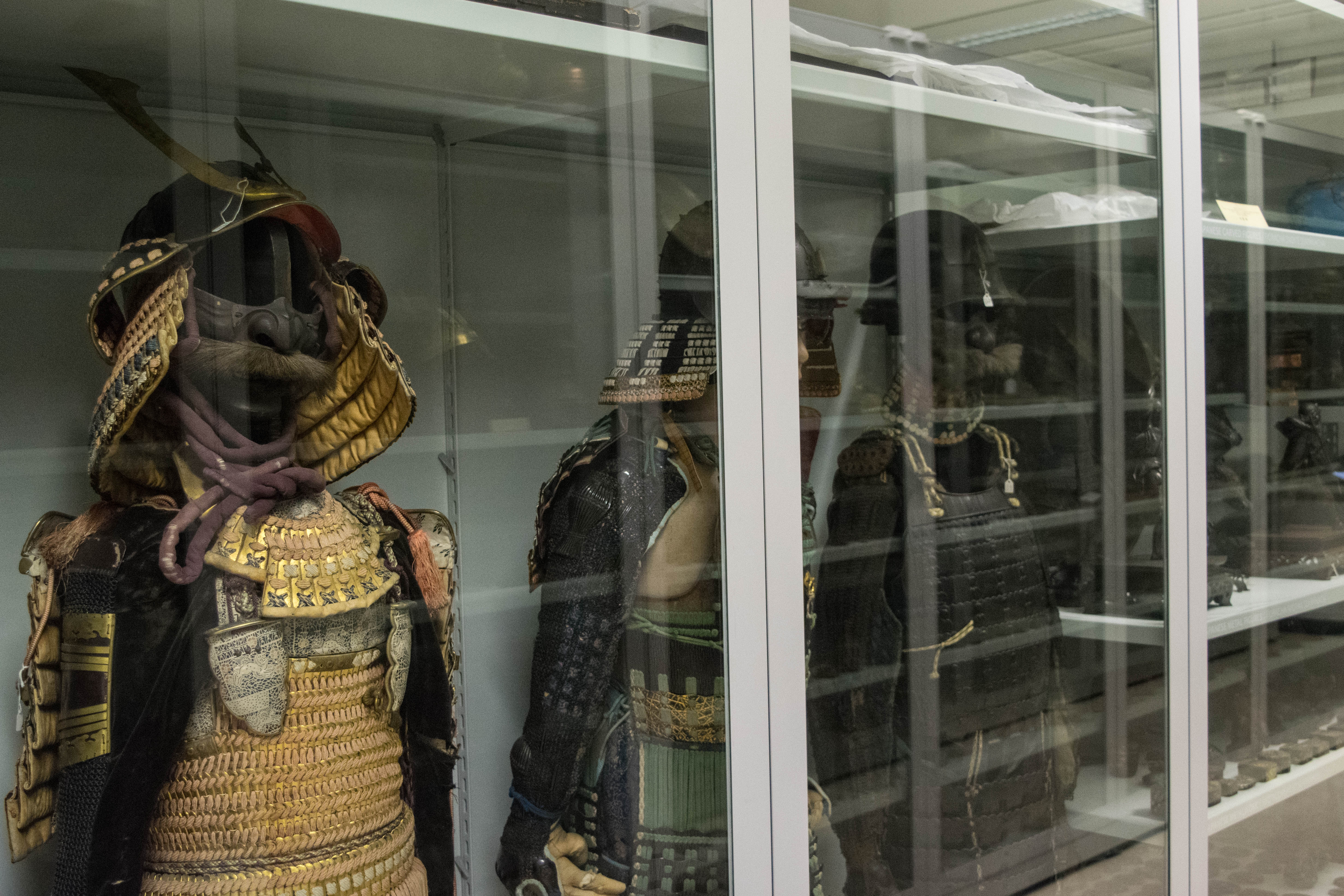
Display of Japanese armour

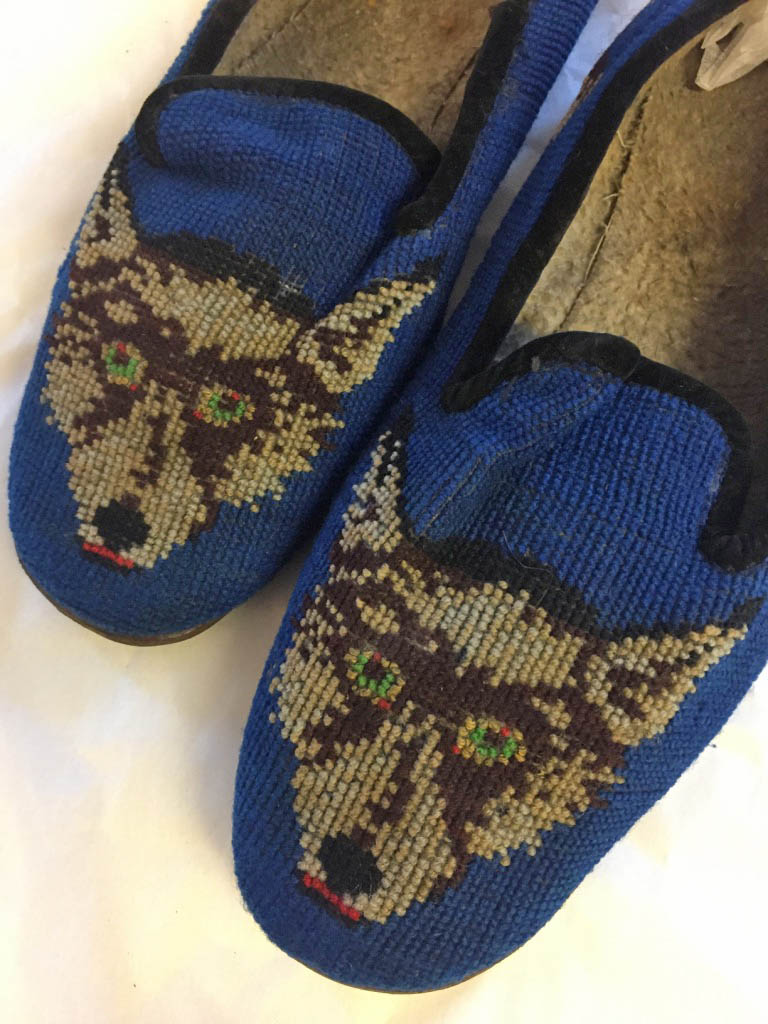
Michael Collins' slippers

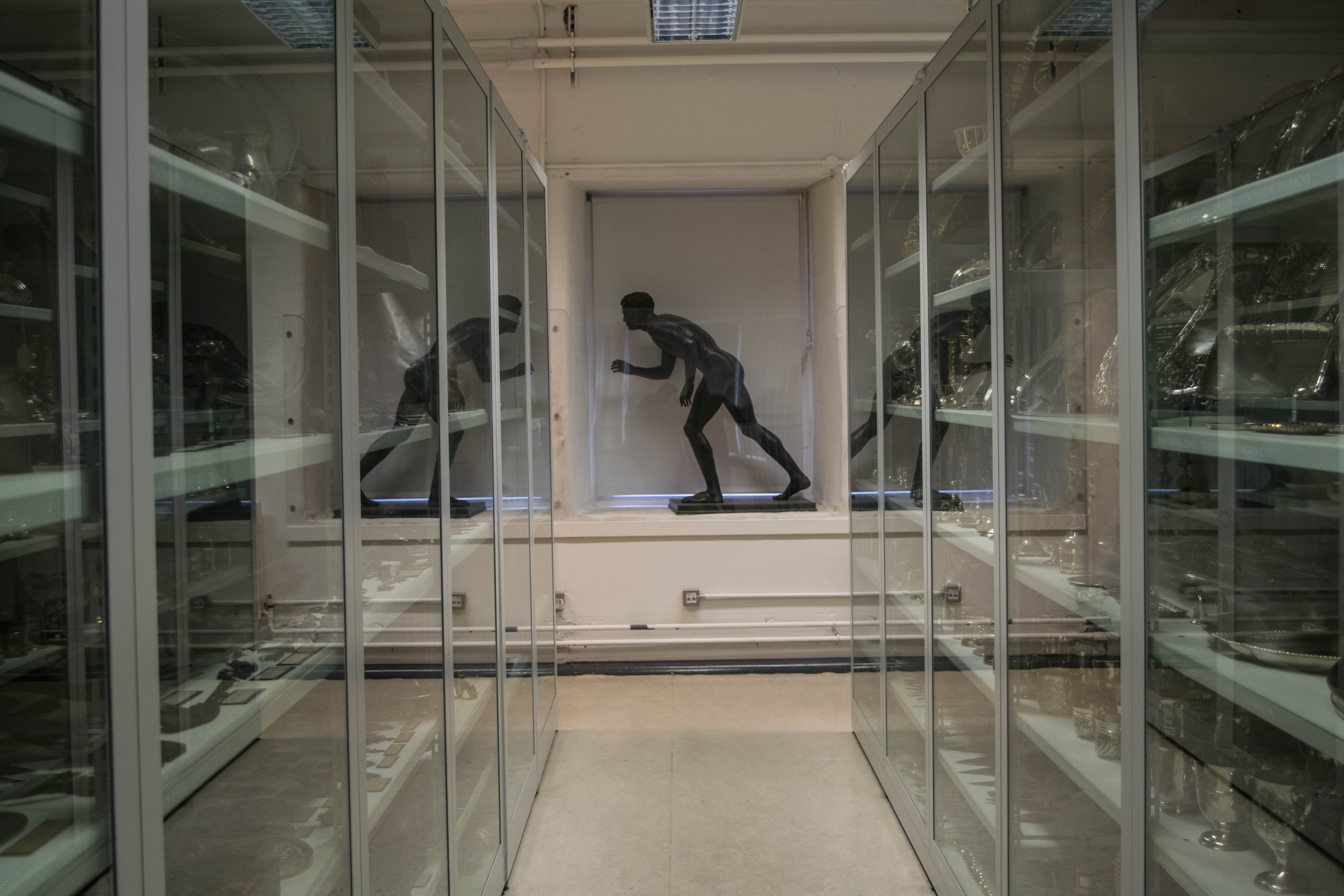
Out of Storage permanent exhibition
