= John Butler Yeats =

Anglo-Irish artist (1839–1922)

John Butler Yeats RHA
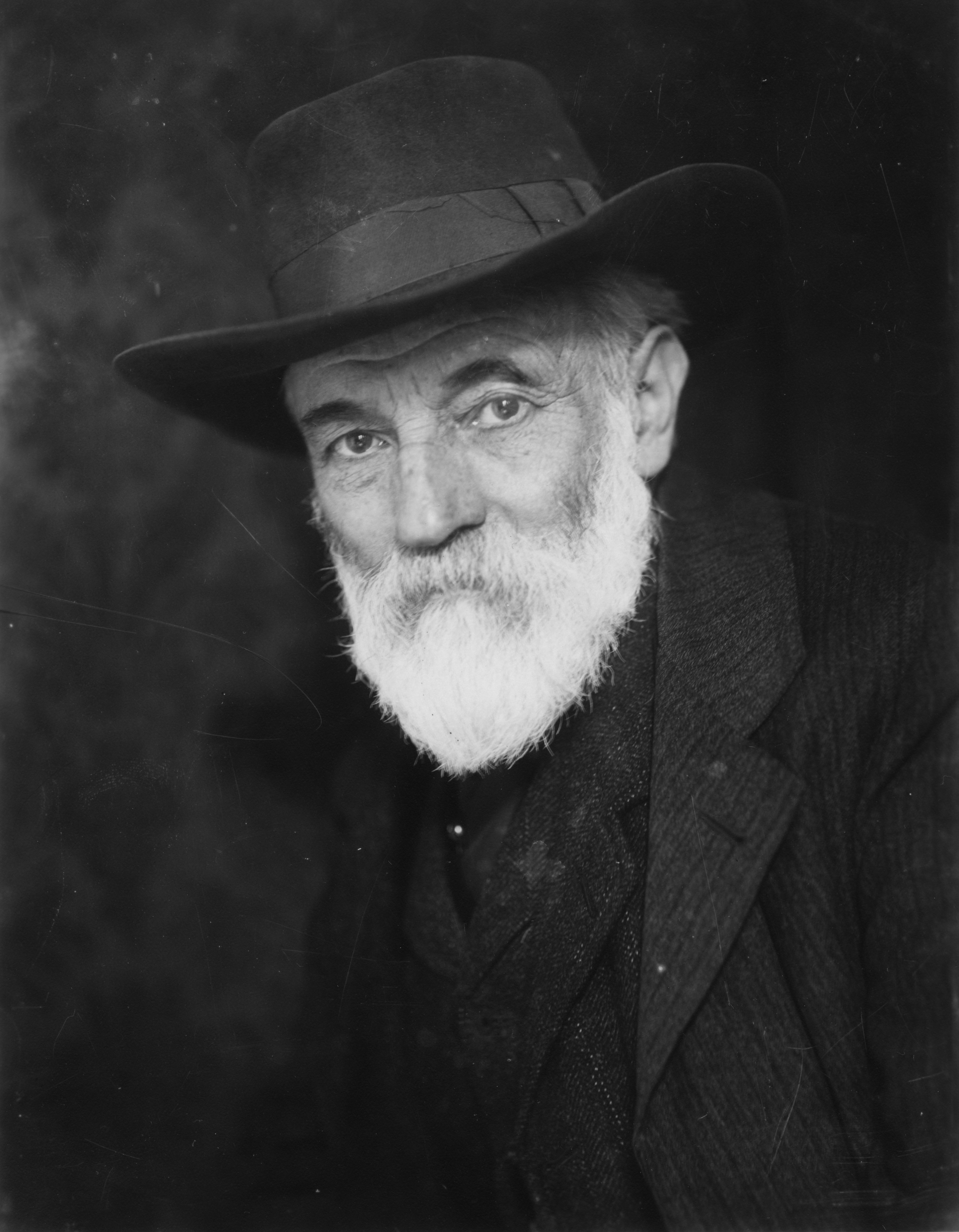
- John Butler Yeats by Alice Boughton
- Born: 16 March 1839; Lawrencetown, County Down, Ireland
- Died: 3 February 1922 (aged 82); New York City, U.S.
- Resting place: Chestertown, New York, U.S.
- Education: Trinity College Dublin; Heatherley School of Fine Art
- Known for: Painting
- Children: W. B. Yeats; Lily Yeats; Elizabeth Yeats; Jack Butler Yeats

John Butler Yeats RHA (16 March 1839 – 3 February 1922) was an Irish artist and the father of W. B. Yeats, Lily Yeats, Elizabeth Corbett "Lollie" Yeats and Jack Butler Yeats. The National Gallery of Ireland holds a number of his portraits in oil and works on paper, including one of his portraits of his son William, painted in 1900.

== Career ==
Yeats was born in Lawrencetown, townland of Tullylish, County Down to an Anglo-Irish family. His parents were William Butler Yeats (1806–1862) and Jane Grace Corbert; John Butler Yeats was the eldest of nine children. Educated at Trinity College Dublin, and a member of the University Philosophical Society, John Butler Yeats began his career as a lawyer and devilled briefly with Isaac Butt before he took up painting in 1867 and studied at the Heatherley School of Fine Art. After John Butler Yeats returned to Ireland in 1881, he began to exhibit paintings at the Royal Hibernian Academy, which elected him a member (RHA) in 1892. There are few records of his sales, so there is no catalogue of his work in private collections. It is possible that some of his early work may have been destroyed by fire in World War II. It is clear that he had no trouble getting commissions as his sketches and oils are found in private homes in Ireland, England and America. His later portraits show great sensitivity to the sitter. However, he was a poor businessman and was never financially secure. He moved house frequently and shifted several times between England and Ireland.

In 1907, at the age of 68, he travelled to New York aboard the RMS Campania with his daughter Lily and never returned to Ireland. In October 1909 he moved into his final home, a boarding house run by the Petitpas sisters which was located at 317 West 29th Street. In New York, he was friendly with members of the Ashcan School of painters. He died in the boarding house on 3 February 1922. Edmund Quinn made a death mask which is now in the collection of the Yeats Society in Sligo. John Butler Yeats is buried in Chestertown Rural Cemetery in Chestertown, New York, next to his friend, Jeanne Robert Foster.

== Family ==
Yeats married Susan Pollexfen (13 July 1841 – 3 January 1900) on 10 September 1863 at St. John's Church, Sligo. Susan Yeats was dismayed when her husband abandoned the study of law to become an artist. Susan is described as a "shadowy figure" who went "quietly, pitifully, mad".

John and Susan had three sons and three daughters, including writer William Butler Yeats and artists Jack Butler Yeats, Susan Mary "Lily" Yeats, and Elizabeth Corbet "Lollie" Yeats.

== Gallery ==
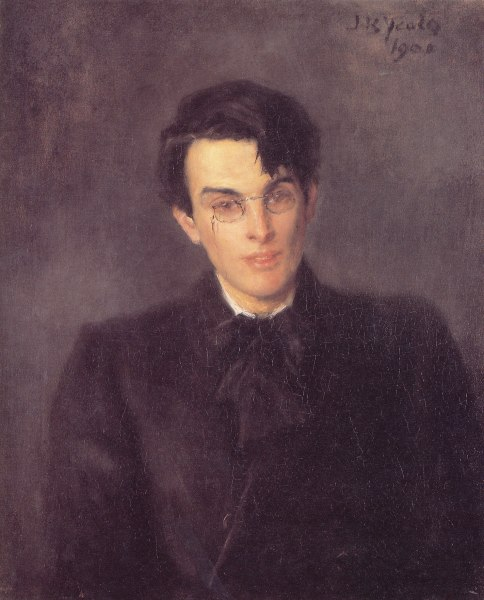
Portrait of W. B. Yeats (1900)

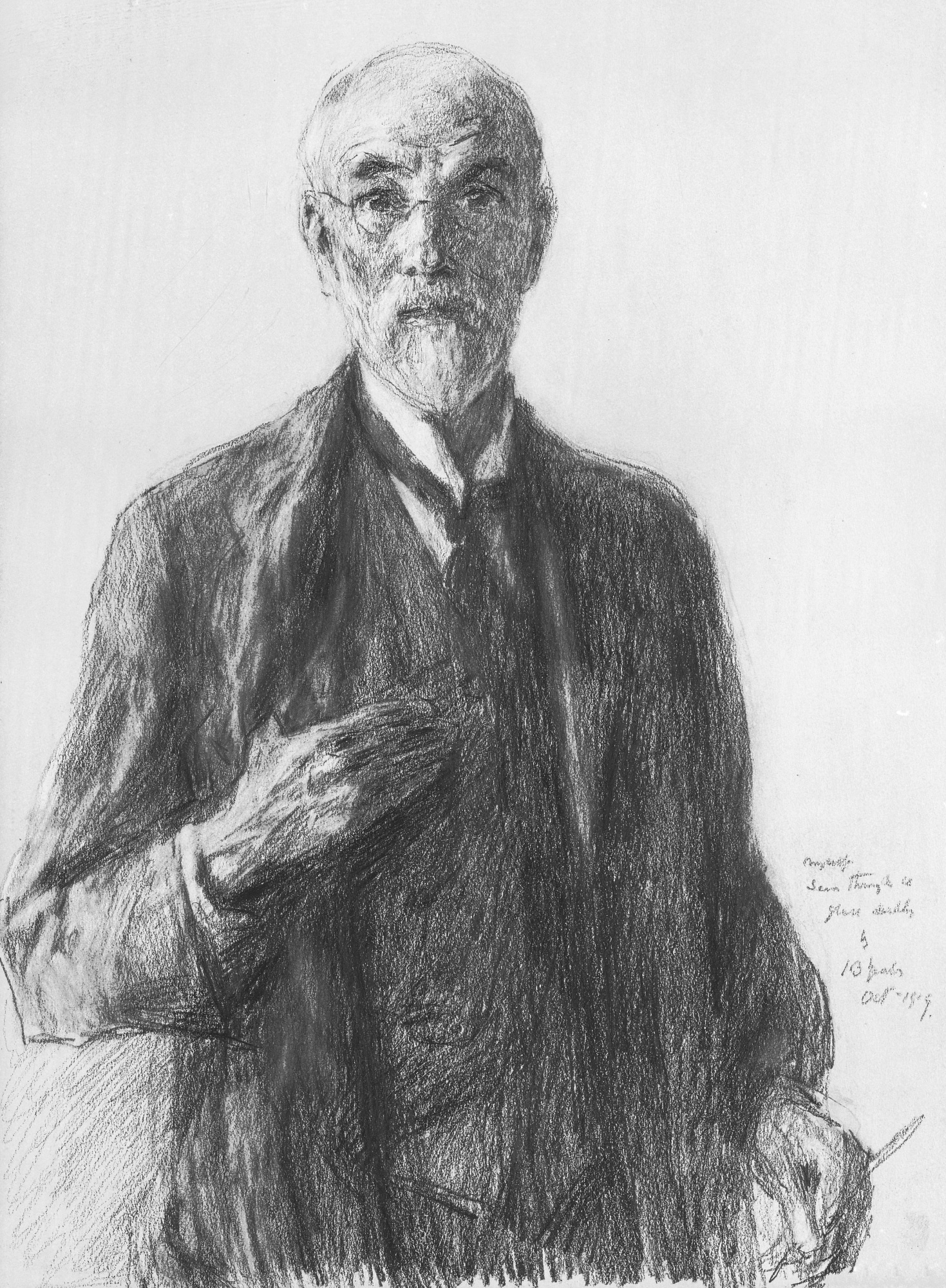
Self-portrait (1919)

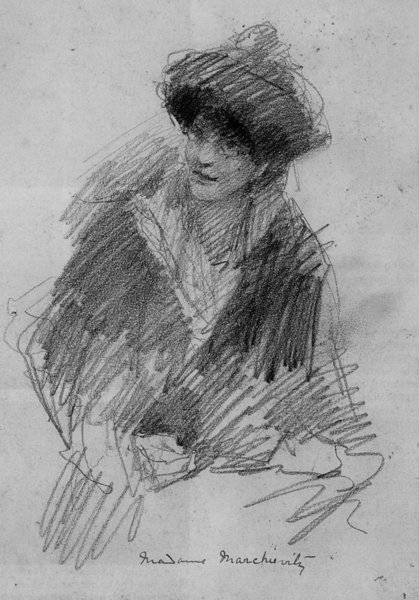
Portrait of Countess Constance Markievicz (before 1922); an Irish politician, revolutionary nationalist and suffragette; pencil drawing

== Sources ==
- John Butler Yeats, Early memories; some chapters of autobiography. Dublin: Cuala Press, 1923
- Douglas N. Archibald (1974), John Butler Yeats Bucknell University Press-Irish Writers Series.
- Martyn Anglesea (2003), Yeats, John Butler in Brian Lalor (Ed.) The Encyclopedia of Ireland. Dublin: Gill & Macmillan. ISBN 0-7171-3000-2.
- Bruce Arnold (1977), Irish Art, a concise history. London: Thames and Hudson. ISBN 0-500-20148-X
- Robert Gordon (1978), John Butler Yeats and John Sloan the records of a friendship. The Dolmen Press New Yeats Papers XIV Dublin.
- Declan J Foley (2009), editor, Letters of John Butler Yeats to his son Jack B. Yeats. Lilliput Press Dublin ISBN 978-1-84351-155-7.
- Joseph Hone, editor (1944), J.B.Yeats Letters to his son W. B. Yeats and Others 1969-1922, Faber and Faber, 1 & 2 eds., republished Martin Secker and Waburg Ltd, (1983). Abridged and with an Introduction by John McGahern. (London): Faber, (1999).
- Raymond Keaveney (2002), National Gallery of Ireland, Essential Guide. London: Scala. ISBN 1-85759-267-0.
- Janis Londraville, editor, (2003) Prodigal Father Revisited: Artists and writers in the World of John Butler Yeats, Locust Hill Press, includes papers from first John Butler Yeats Seminar, Chestertown 2001.
- William M. Murphy (1978), Prodigal Father: The Life of John Butler Yeats, 1839–1922, published by Cornell University Press. Paperback 1979, and reprinted in paperback with some new material in 2001 by Syracuse University Press.
- William M. Murphy (1995), Family Secrets: William Butler Yeats and His Relatives Syracuse University Press, 1995.
- William M. Murphy (1971), The Yeats Family and the Pollexfens of Sligo (Dublin:Dolmen).
- William M. Murphy; Fintan Cullen, eds.(1987), The Drawings of John Butler Yeats. (Albany, New York: Albany Institute of History and Art, and Union College, Departments of Art and English).
- William M Murphy (1995), Family Secrets William Butler Yeats and His Relatives. Syracuse UP.
- Robert Gordon (1978), John Butler Yeats and John Sloan: The Record of a Friendship. The Dolmen Press New Yeats Papers XIV Dublin.
- Lennox Robinson, editor (1920), Further Letters of John Butler Yeats: Selected by Lennox Robinson, The Cuala Press, Churchtown, Dundrum, County Dublin.
- Yeats John Butler (1918), Essays Irish and American, (with an appreciation by AE) Talbot Press Dublin/T Fisher Unwin London. Early Memories: Some Chapters of Autobiography (1923) The Cuala Press, Churchtown, Dundrum County Dublin.
- Passages From The Letters of John Butler Yeats: Selected by Ezra Pound (1917). The Cuala Press Churchtown, Dundrum, County Dublin
- James White (1972), John Butler Yeats and The Irish Renaissance with pictures from the collection of Michael Butler Yeats and from The National Gallery of Ireland. The Dolmen Press Dublin.
