= Jack B. Yeats =

Irish artist (1871–1957)

Jack Butler Yeats
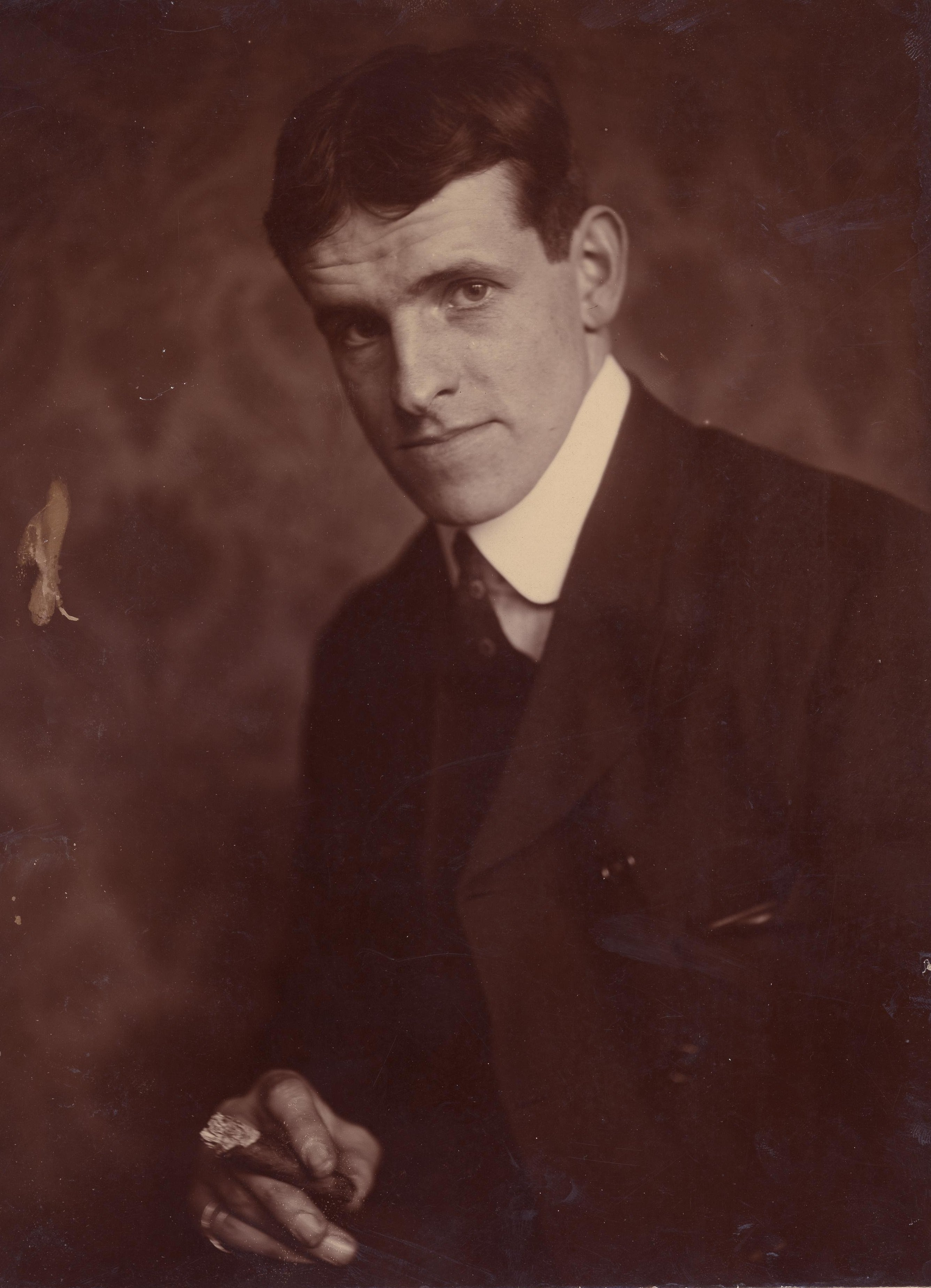
- Yeats in 1904
- Born: 29 August 1871; London, England
- Died: 28 March 1957 (aged 85); Dublin, Ireland
- Known for: Painting
- Father: John Butler Yeats
- Relatives: W. B. Yeats (brother); Lily Yeats (sister); Elizabeth Yeats (sister)

Olympic medal record

Art competitions
Silver medal – second place	1924 Paris	Painting

Jack Butler Yeats RHA (29 August 1871 – 28 March 1957) was an Irish artist. Born into a family of impoverished Anglo-Irish landholders, his father was the painter John Butler Yeats, and his brother was the poet W. B. Yeats. Jack B. was born in London but was raised in County Sligo with his maternal grandparents, before returning to London in 1887 to live with his parents. Afterwards he travelled frequently between the two countries; while in Ireland he lived mainly in Greystones, County Wicklow and in Dublin city.

Yeats's first solo exhibition "Sketches of Life in the West of Ireland" was held in 1898. He began as an illustrator and watercolourist until moving to oil paint around 1906. His early pictures are lyrical depictions of landscapes and figures predominantly from the west of Ireland. His early oil paintings are heavily influenced by Romanticism, before he adopted Expressionism c. 1910, for which he became famous.

He died in Dublin in 1957, aged 85 years. The National Gallery of Ireland holds a significant collection of his paintings, as well as his personal archive.

== Early life ==
Yeats was born in London, England. He was the youngest son of the Irish portraitist John Butler Yeats and the brother of W. B. Yeats (William Butler), who received the 1923 Nobel Prize in Literature. He grew up in Sligo with his maternal grandparents, before returning to his parents' home in London in 1887. Yeats attended the Chiswick School of Art with his sisters Elizabeth and Susan, learning "Freehand drawing in all its branches, practical Geometry and perspective, pottery and tile painting, design for decorative purposes – as in Wall-papers, Furniture, Metalwork, Stained Glass". He briefly attended The High School Dublin as a pupil alongside his brother.

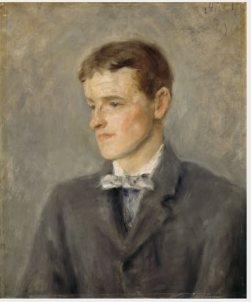
Portrait of Jack B. Yeats as a boy painted by John Butler Yeats, c. 1883-1884

Early in his career, Yeats worked as an illustrator for magazines like the Boy's Own Paper and Judy, drew comic strips, including the Sherlock Holmes parody "Chubb-Lock Homes" for Comic Cuts, and wrote articles for Punch under the pseudonym "W. Bird". In 1894 he married Mary Cottenham White, a fellow student, also a native of England and two years his senior. At the 1911 Census they lived in Greystones in County Wicklow.

== Career ==
From around 1920, he developed into an intensely Expressionist artist, moving from illustration to Symbolism. He was sympathetic to the Irish Republican cause, but not politically active. However, he believed that 'a painter must be part of the land and of the life he paints', and his own artistic development, as a Modernist and Expressionist, helped articulate a modern Dublin of the 20th century, partly by depicting specifically Irish subjects, but also by doing so in the light of universal themes such as the loneliness of the individual, and the universality of the plight of man. Samuel Beckett wrote that "Yeats is with the great of our time... because he brings light, as only the great dare to bring light, to the issueless predicament of existence." The Marxist art critic and author John Berger also paid tribute to Yeats from a very different perspective, praising the artist as a "great painter" with a "sense of the future, an awareness of the possibility of a world other than the one we know".

His favourite subjects included the Irish landscape, horses, circus and travelling players. His early paintings and drawings are distinguished by an energetic simplicity of line and colour, and his later paintings by an extremely vigorous and experimental treatment of often thickly applied paint. He frequently abandoned the brush altogether, applying paint in a variety of different ways, and was deeply interested in the expressive power of colour. Despite his position as the most important Irish artist of the 20th century (and the first to sell for over £1m), he took no pupils and allowed no one to watch him work, so he remains a unique figure.

In 1943, Yeats accepted Victor Waddington as his sole dealer and business manager. Waddington played a crucial role in building his career and reputation.

Besides painting, Yeats had a significant interest in theatre and in literature. He was a close friend of the playwright and novelist Samuel Beckett. He designed sets for the Abbey Theatre and three of his own plays were produced there. His literary works include The Careless Flower, The Amaranthers (much admired by Beckett), Ah Well, A Romance in Perpetuity, And To You Also, and The Charmed Life. Yeats's paintings usually bear poetic and evocative titles. He was elected a member of the Royal Hibernian Academy in 1916.

When Yeats's wife, Cottie, died in 1947, his art took on a more metaphysical tone and became more nostalgic and optimistic. He continued working through the final years of his life and died in Dublin in 1957. He is buried in Mount Jerome Cemetery.

Yeats holds the distinction of being Ireland's first medallist at the Olympic Games in the wake of the creation of the Irish Free State. At the 1924 Summer Olympics in Paris, Yeats' painting The Liffey Swim won a silver medal in the arts and culture segment of the Games. In the competition records the painting is simply entitled Swimming.

== Works ==
In November 2010, one of Yeats's works, A Horseman Enters a Town at Night, painted in 1948 and previously owned by novelist Graham Greene, sold for nearly £350,000 at a Christie's auction in London. A smaller work, Man in a Room Thinking, painted in 1947, sold for £66,000 at the same auction. His painting Sleep Sound (1955) was bought by David Bowie in 1993 for £45,500 and sold at auction in 2016 for £233,000.

In 1999 the painting, The Wild Ones, sold at Sotheby's in London for over £1.2m. Whyte's Auctioneers hold the world record sale price for a Yeats painting, Reverie (1931), which sold for €1,400,000 in November 2019.

== Public collections ==
Yeats paintings are held, among others, in the following public collections:

- The Model, Sligo
- The Hunt Museum, Limerick
- National Gallery of Ireland, Dublin
- Crawford Art Gallery, Cork
- National Gallery of Canada, Ottawa
- Walters Art Museum, Baltimore
  - The Swinford Funeral at the Walters Art Museum
- The Municipal Art Collection, Waterford
- Ulster Museum, Belfast
- The Snite Museum of Art, University of Notre Dame
  - Driftwood in a Cave at the Snite Museum of Art
