= Lily Yeats =

Irish artist (1866–1949)

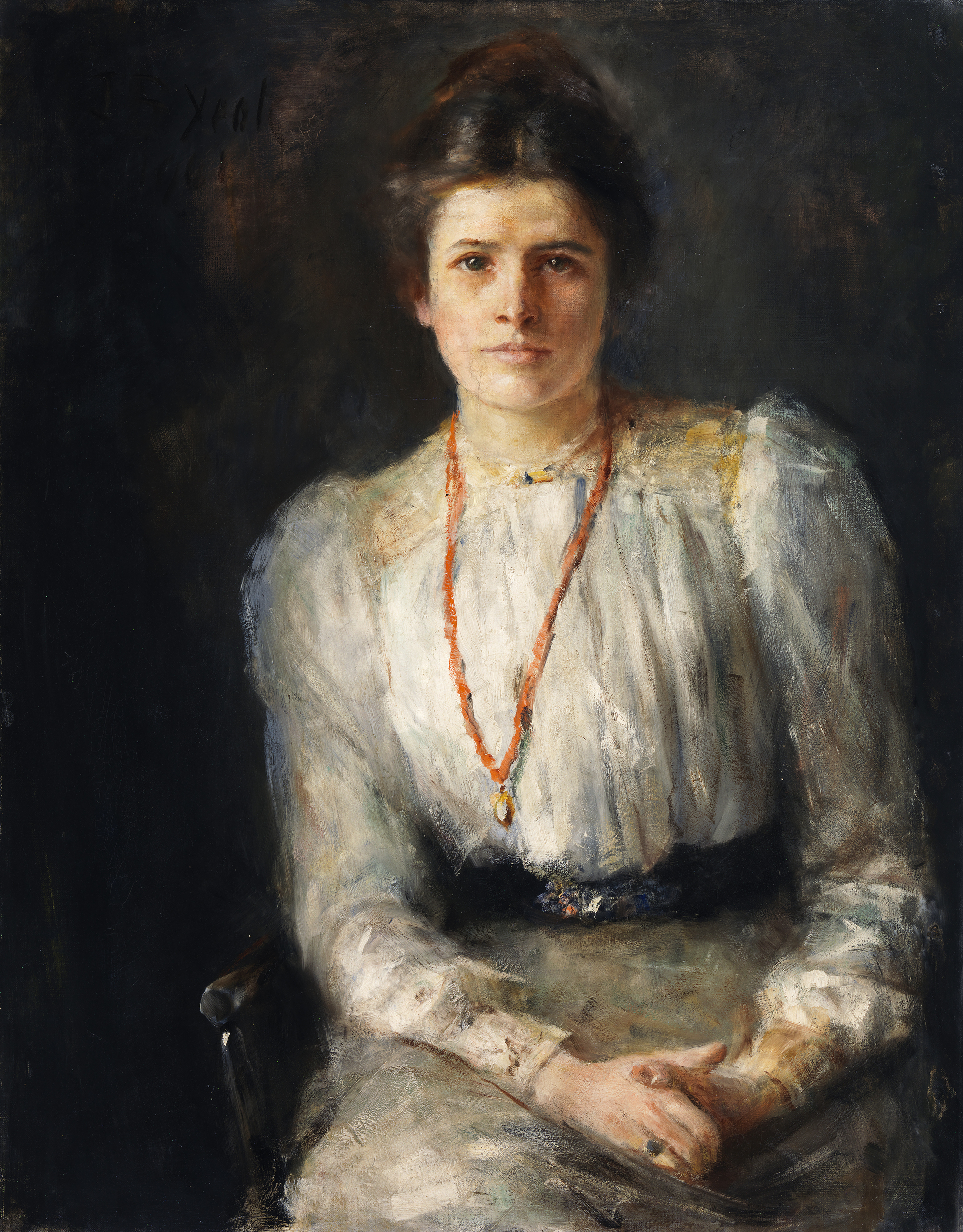
- Born: 25 August 1866; Enniscrone, County Sligo, Ireland
- Died: 5 January 1949 (aged 82); Dublin, Ireland
- Education: Dublin Metropolitan School of Art
- Occupation: Embroiderer
- Father: John Butler Yeats
- Relatives: W. B. Yeats (brother); Jack Butler Yeats (brother); Elizabeth Yeats (sister)

Susan Mary Yeats (/ˈjeɪts/; 25 August 1866 – 5 January 1949), known as Lily Yeats, was an embroiderer associated with the Celtic Revival. In 1908 she founded the embroidery department of Cuala Industries, with which she was involved until its dissolution in 1931. She is known for her embroidered pictures.

== Early life and education ==
Born in Enniscrone, County Sligo, Ireland on 25 August 1866, she was the daughter of John Butler Yeats and Susan Yeats (née Pollexfen). Her siblings were William Butler, Jack and Elizabeth Yeats. She was a sick child. Susan brought the children every year on holidays to her parents recently acquired home at Merville (1965) just outside the town of Sligo, sometimes staying til Christmas. The longest time was from July 1872 until November 1874, during which time John Butler often joined them. The maternal grandparents were William Pollexfen and Elizabeth (nee Middleton). In late 1874 the Yeats family moved to 14 Edith Villas, West Kensington, London. Whilst living there, Yeats and her siblings were educated by a governess, Martha Jowitt until 1876. In 1878, the family moved to a larger house in Bedford Park, Chiswick, where she attended Notting Hill school for a short time.The Yeats family moved to Howth, County Dublin in 1881, where Lily enrolled in the Dublin Metropolitan School of Art along with her sister Elizabeth in 1883. They also took classes in the Royal Dublin Society.

The Yeats family moved to Eardley Crescent, South Kensington, Yeats became ill and was sent to live with relatives. She eventually went to live with her aunt Elizabeth Pollexfen Orr and her invalided mother in Huddersfield in 1887. In 1888, she returned to the family home in 3 Blenheim Road, Bedford Park. From here, the family often visited with William Morris at Kelmscott House. Money was tight, and Lily was offered an opportunity to learn embroidery in the style propounded by Morris, which would become known as art needlework. She attended the Chiswick School of Art with her sister Susan and brother Jack and also studied under Morris's daughter May, who ran the embroidery section of Morris & Co. and worked there until April 1894 when she left due to ill health. She worked for a time as a governess at Hyère in the south of France. Whilst there, she contracted typhoid, and returned to London in December 1896. From late 1897, writer Susan L. Mitchell lodged with the Yeats family, when Yeats and Mitchell became close friends. By 10 December 1888 Yeats had returned to Morris & Co. and was paid ten shillings for her first week's work for the firm. By March 1889 Lily was training embroideresses for the firm.

== Career ==
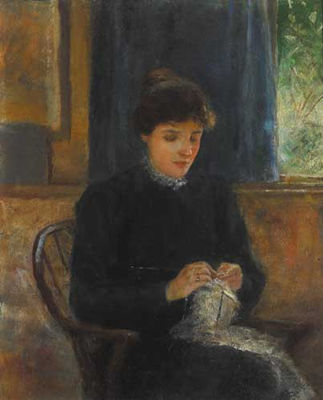
portrait by John Butler Yeats

Lily continued to work under May Morris for six years, but their relationship was strained (she called her employer "the Gorgon" in her scrapbook) In 1895, Lily caught typhoid fever while in France, and her health remained uncertain for the remainder of the decade. After their mother's death in 1900, Lily and her sister Elizabeth returned to Ireland with their friend Evelyn Gleeson. By this time Lily had also assumed the guardianship of her teenage cousin Ruth Pollexfen, a talented embroiderer in her own right. In 1902 the sisters and Gleeson founded a craft studio near Dublin which they named Dun Emer (the Fort of Emer) after Emer, the wife of Irish legendary hero Cuchullain. Dun Emer became a focus of the burgeoning Irish Arts and Crafts Movement, focusing on embroidery, printing, and rug and tapestry-making. They recruited young local women to the enterprise, teaching them painting, drawing, cooking, sewing, and the Irish language in addition to the Guild's core crafts. Lily Yeats ran the embroidery department, which created textiles for church decoration and domestic use.

In 1904, the operation was reorganized into two parts, the Dun Emer Guild run by Gleeson and Dun Emer Industries under the direction of the Yeats sisters, and in 1908 the groups separated completely. Gleeson retained the Dun Emer name, and the Yeats sisters established Cuala Industries at nearby Churchtown, which ran a small press, the Cuala Press, and an embroidery workshop. William Butler Yeats's wife George (Bertha Georgina), helped Lily run the embroidery arm of the studio which produced clothing and linens.

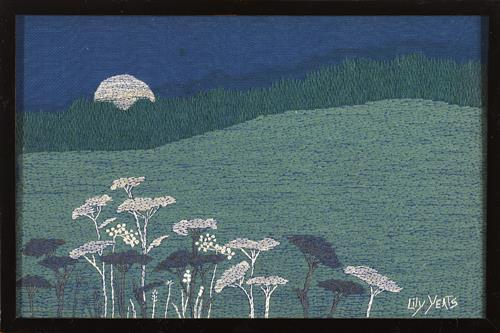
Landscape at Night

The Yeats sisters lived together through their adult lives, albeit contentiously. In 1923, Lily fell dangerously ill with what was believed to be tuberculosis while on holiday in London, and her brother lodged her in a London nursing home in July, where she remained until the following April. On her recovery, she returned to Cuala, but the embroidery department was never a resounding success. Lily's health deteriorated again in 1931 (her ailment had finally been correctly diagnosed in 1929 as a malformed thyroid), and the decision was made to dissolve the embroidery branch of Cuala. At the time, Lily wrote

I never should have taken up the work after my illness. The eight years have been a very great strain, and each year a small loss, adding up.

Lily Yeats continued to sell embroidered pictures in the following years. She died at her residence in Churchtown, Dublin on 5 January 1949.
