= W. B. Yeats bibliography =

This is a list of all works by Irish poet and dramatist W. B. Yeats (1865–1939), winner of the 1923 Nobel Prize in Literature and a major figure in 20th-century literature. Works sometimes appear twice if parts of new editions or significantly revised. Posthumous editions are also included if they are the first publication of a new or significantly revised work. Years are linked to corresponding "year in poetry" articles for works of poetry, and "year in literature" articles for other works.

== 1880s ==
- 1885 – "Song of the Fairies" & "Voices," poems in the Dublin University Review (March)
- 1886 – Mosada, verse play
- 1888 – Fairy and Folk Tales of the Irish Peasantry
- 1889 – Crossways
- 1889 – The Wanderings of Oisin and Other Poems, includes "The Wanderings of Oisin", "The Song of the Happy Shepherd", "The Stolen Child" and "Down by the Salley Gardens"

== 1890s ==
- 1890 – "The Lake Isle of Innisfree", poem first published in the National Observer, 13 December; poem included in The Countess Kathleen and Various Legends and Lyrics, 1892
- 1890 – Irish Fairies in The Leisure Hour
- 1891 – Representative Irish Tales
- 1891 – John Sherman and Dhoya, two stories
- 1892 – Irish Fairy Tales
- 1892 – The Countess Kathleen and Various Legends and Lyrics, includes "The Lake Isle of Innisfree" (see 1890, above) (Lyrics from this book appear in Yeats' collected editions in a section titled "The Rose" [1893] but Yeats never published a book titled "The Rose")
- 1893 – The Celtic Twilight, poetry and nonfiction
- 1893 – The Works of William Blake: Poetic, Symbolic and Critical, co-written with Edwin Ellis
- 1894 – The Land of Heart's Desire, published in April, his first acted play, performed 29 March
- 1895 – Editor, A Book of Irish Verse, an anthology
- 1897 – The Tables of the Law. The Adoration of the Magi, privately printed; The Tables of the Law first published in The Savoy, November 1896; a regular edition of this book appeared in 1904
- 1897 – The Secret Rose, fiction
- 1899 – The Wind Among the Reeds, including "Song of the Old Mother"

== 1900s ==
- 1900 – The Shadowy Waters, poems
- 1902 – Cathleen Ní Houlihan, play
- 1903 – Ideas of Good and Evil, nonfiction
- 1903 – In the Seven Woods, poems, includes "Adam's Curse" (Dun Emer Press)
- 1903 – Where There is Nothing, play
- 1903 – The Hour Glass, play, copyright edition (see also 1904 edition)
- 1904 – The Hour-Glass; Cathleen ni Houlihan; The Pot of Broth, plays
- 1904 – The King's Threshold; and On Baile's Strand
- 1904 – The Tables of the Law; The Adoration of the Magi, a privately printed edition appeared in 1897
- 1905 – Stories of Red Hanrahan, published in 1905 by the Dun Emer Press, although the book states the year of publication was 1904; contains stories from The Secret Rose (1897) rewritten with Lady Gregory; another edition was published in 1927
- 1906 – Poems, 1899 –1905, verse and plays
- 1907 – Deirdre
- 1907 – Discoveries, nonfiction

== 1910s ==
- 1910 – The Green Helmet and Other Poems, verse and plays
- 1910 – Poems: Second Series
- 1911 – Synge and the Ireland of his Time, nonfiction
- 1912 – The Cutting of an Agate
- 1912 – Selections from the Writings of Lord Dunsany
- 1912 – A Coat
- 1913 – Poems Written in Discouragement
- 1916 – Responsibilities, and Other Poems
- 1916 – Reveries Over Childhood and Youth, nonfiction
- 1916 – Easter 1916
- 1917 – The Wild Swans at Coole, Other Verses and a Play in Verse, a significantly revised edition appeared in 1919
- 1918 – Per Amica Silentia Lunae
- 1918 – In Memory of Major Robert Gregory
- 1918 – The Leaders of the Crowd
- 1919 – Two Plays for Dancers, plays; became part of Four Plays for Dancers, published in 1921
- 1919 – The Wild Swans at Coole, significant revision of the 1917 edition: has the poems from the 1917 edition and others, including "An Irish Airman Foresees His Death" and "The Phases of the Moon"; contains: "The Wild Swans at Coole", "Ego Dominus Tuus", "The Scholars" and "On being asked for a War Poem"

== 1920s ==
- 1920 – "The Second Coming"
- 1921 – Michael Robartes and the Dancer, poems; published in February, although book itself states "1920"
- 1921 – Four Plays for Dancers, plays; includes contents of Two Plays for Dancers, published in 1919, together with At the Hawk's Well and Calvary
- 1921 – Four Years
- 1922 – Later Poems
- 1922 – The Player Queen, play
- 1922 – Plays in Prose and Verse, plays
- 1922 – The Trembling of the Veil
- 1922 – Seven Poems and a Fragment
- 1923 – Plays and Controversies
- 1924 – The Cat and the Moon, and Certain Poems, poems and drama
- 1924 – Essays
- 1925 – The Bounty of Sweden
- 1925 – A Vision, nonfiction, a much revised edition appeared in 1937, and a final revised edition was published in 1956
- 1926 – Estrangement
- 1926 – Autobiographies of William Butler Yeats, nonfiction; see also, Autobiography 1938
- 1927 – October Blast
- 1927 – Stories of Red Hanrahan and the Secret Rose, poetry and fiction
- 1927 – The Resurrection, a short play first performed in 1934
- 1928 – The Tower, includes "Sailing to Byzantium"
- 1928 – The Death of Synge, and Other Passages from an Old Diary, poems
- 1928 – Sophocles' King Oedipus: a version for the modern stage
- 1929 – A Packet for Ezra Pound, poems
- 1929 – The Winding Stair published by Fountain Press in a signed limited edition, now exceedingly rare

== 1930s ==
- 1932 – Words for Music Perhaps, and Other Poems
- 1933 – Collected Poems
- 1933 – The Winding Stair and Other Poems
- 1934 – Collected Plays
- 1934 – The King of the Great Clock Tower, poems
- 1934 – Wheels and Butterflies, drama
- 1934 – The Words Upon the Window Pane, drama
- 1935 – Dramatis Personae
- 1935 – A Full Moon in March, poems
- 1937 – A Vision B, nonfiction, a much revised edition of the original, which appeared in 1925; reissued with minor changes in 1956, and with further changes in 1962
- 1937 – Essays 1931 to 1936
- 1937 – Broadsides: New Irish & English Songs, edited by Yeats and Dorothy Wellesley
- 1938 – Autobiography, includes Reveries over Childhood and Youth (published in 1914), The Trembling of the Veil (1922), Dramatis Personae (1935), The Death of Synge (1928), and other pieces; see also Autobiographies (1926)
- 1938 – The Herne's Egg, drama
- 1938 – The Ten Principal Upanishads
- 1938 – New Poems
- 1939 – Last Poems and Two Plays poems and drama (posthumous)
- 1939 – On the Boiler, essays, poems and a play (posthumous)
