= 1919 in Ireland =

- Centuries: 18th; 19th; 20th; 21st
- Decades: 1890s; 1900s; 1910s; 1920s; 1930s
- See also: 1919 in the United Kingdom; Other events of 1919; List of years in Ireland

Events from the year 1919 in Ireland.

== Incumbents ==
- President of Dáil Éireann:
  - Cathal Brugha (from 22 January 1919 until 1 April 1919)
  - Éamon de Valera (from 2 April 1919)
- Minister for Finance:
  - Eoin MacNeill (from 22 January 1919 until 1 April 1919)
  - Michael Collins (from 2 April 1919)
- Dáil: 1st (from 21 January 1919)

== Events ==
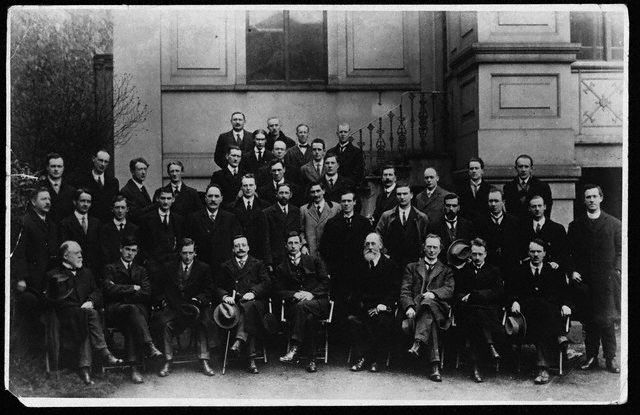
The First Dáil Éireann at the Mansion House in Dublin on 10 April 1919

- 21 January
  - Dáil Éireann met for the first time in the Round Room of the Mansion House, Dublin. It comprised Sinn Féin party members elected in the 1918 general election who, in accordance with their manifesto, did not take their seats in the Parliament of the United Kingdom but chose to declare an independent Irish Republic.
  - In the first shots of the Irish War of Independence, two Royal Irish Constabulary (RIC) members were killed by Volunteers of the Third Tipperary Brigade in the Soloheadbeg Ambush in County Tipperary.
- 27 January – A general strike call over working hours was led by engineering workers in Glasgow and Belfast; in Belfast the strike collapsed after a month.
- 3 February – Éamon de Valera, the leader of Sinn Féin, John Milroy and John McGarry escaped from Lincoln Prison in England in a break arranged by Sinn Féin members including Michael Collins and Harry Boland.
- 19 March – The first spoken word radio transmission from east to west across the Atlantic wa made by Marconi's Wireless Telegraph Company from Ballybunion to Louisburg, Nova Scotia.
- 1 April – Fifty-two members of Sinn Féin attended the second meeting of Dáil Éireann. Seán T. O'Kelly was elected Ceann Comhairle and Éamon de Valera was elected President of Dáil Éireann.
- 2 April – Constance Markievicz was appointed Minister for Labour, becoming the first Irish female cabinet minister (the only one for sixty years) and the first in Western Europe.
- 15–19 April – "Limerick Soviet": A general strike was called by the Limerick Trades and Labour Council as a protest against the declaration of a "Special Military Area" under the Defence of the Realm Act covering of most of the city of Limerick and its surroundings.
- 18 April – A thousand delegates from all over Ireland attended the Sinn Féin ardfheis (party conference) in Dublin. Éamon de Valera was elected President of the organisation.
- 19 April – Sinn Féin proposed an Executive Council of the Irish National Alliance to challenge the right of any foreign parliament to make laws for Ireland.
- 13 May – Two Royal Irish Constabulary members were killed and Irish Republican Army volunteers Dan Breen and Seán Treacy were wounded while rescuing Seán Hogan from a guarded train carriage at Knocklong, County Limerick.
- 17 May – The first Republican law court was set up, at Ballinrobe, County Mayo.
- 14 June – John Alcock and Arthur Brown completed the first non-stop transatlantic flight when they landed near Clifden, County Galway at 8.40 am, having flown 1,900 miles from St. John's in Newfoundland in 16 hours.
- 18 June – The Dáil established the National Arbitration Courts.
- 30 July – The first assassination of a Royal Irish Constabulary officer was carried out by Irish Republican Army unit The Squad, newly formed under the orders of Michael Collins, when Detective Sergeant Pat "the Dog" Smyth of G division was shot near Drumcondra, Dublin.
- 10 August – The date on which the fictitious Fr. Pat Noise purportedly died in Dublin when his carriage "plunged into the Liffey" (See: Fr. Pat Noise plaque on O'Connell Bridge).
- 12 August – St Colman's Cathedral, Cobh, was consecrated.
- 8 September – "The sack of Fermoy": Drunken British forces rampaged through Fermoy following an inquest on the death of a British soldier which failed to find for murder.
- 12 September – Dáil Éireann was declared illegal by the British authorities. There were raids on Sinn Féin centres and Ernest Blythe was arrested.
- 4 November – The British Cabinet's Irish Committee settled on a policy of creating two Home Rule parliaments – one in Dublin and one in Belfast – with a Council of Ireland to provide a framework for possible unity.
- 12 November – Mitchelstown Creameries, predecessor of Dairygold, opened for business as a co-operative.
- 19 December – Irish Volunteers from Dublin and Tipperary under the leadership of Paddy Daly ambushed Lord French's motorcade of three cars at Ashtown Road in Dublin. Lord French was the British Viceroy, Lord Lieutenant of Ireland, and Supreme Commander of the British Army in Ireland. While three of French's party – two RIC officers and a driver – were wounded, French got through unharmed. Volunteer Martin Savage was killed and Dan Breen was wounded.
- 23 December – The Irish Land (Provision for Soldiers and Sailors) Act was passed by the Parliament of the United Kingdom, empowering the Irish Land Commission to provide housing for any men who had served in the British forces.

Undated:

- Yitzhak HaLevi Herzog, previously Chief Rabbi of Belfast, was appointed to serve in Dublin.
- Harry Gallagher and Eileen Gallagher established Urney Chocolates from their home in Urney, County Tyrone.
- An early 16th century stone effigy of chain-mailed knight Sir Thomas FitzEustace was brought from Old Kilcullen to St. John's Church, Ballymore Eustace for safe-keeping.

== Arts and literature ==
- October – W. B. Yeats travelled to the United States and began a lecture tour lasting until May 1920. In this year also, Yeats published a major revision of The Wild Swans at Coole (including "An Irish Airman Foresees His Death", "The Phases of the Moon", "The Scholars", and "On being asked for a War Poem"), Two Plays for Dancers and "A Prayer for My Daughter".
- Ina Boyle's orchestral rhapsody The Magic Harp was premiered.
- Harry Clarke's illustrations to an edition of Tales of Mystery & Imagination were published.
- Francis Ledwidge's Complete Poems were published posthumously, edited by Lord Dunsany.
- C. S. Lewis, writing as Clive Hamilton, published Spirits in Bondage: a cycle of lyrics, his first published work, in London.
- Seumas O'Kelly's novella The Golden Barque and The Weaver's Grave were published posthumously.
- Pádraig Ó Siochfhradha, writing as An Seabhac ("The Hawk"), published his semi-autobiographical comic story Jimín Mháire Thaidhg.

== Sport ==
=== Association football ===
- Irish League
  Winners: Belfast Celtic
  Irish Cup
  Winners: Linfield 2–1 Glentoran
  International matches
  25 October Ireland 1–1 England (in Belfast)

=== Gaelic Athletic Association (GAA) sports ===
- All Ireland Senior Hurling Final
  Cork 6–4 d Dublin 2–4
  All Ireland Senior Football Final
  Kildare 2–5 d Galway 0–1

== Births ==
- 26 January – Tom Aherne, association football player (died 1999).
- 30 January – Robert Lowry, Baron Lowry, Lord Chief Justice of Northern Ireland (died 1999).
- 23 February – Johnny Carey, association football player and manager (died 1995).
- 18 March – G. E. M. Anscombe, analytic philosopher (died 2001).
- 3 April – Myles McKeon, Roman Catholic Bishop of Bunbury, Australia (died 2016).
- 3 April – Eoghan Ó Tuairisc, poet and writer (died 1982).
- 9 April – Gordon Lambert, art collector, member of the Seanad (died 2005).
- 1 May – Dan O'Herlihy, actor (died 2005).
- 5 May – Séamus Ennis, uilleann piper, singer and folk-song collector (died 1982).
- 9 May – Joseph Bermingham, Irish Labour Party teachta dála (TD) (died 1995).
- 9 May – Anne Yeats, painter and stage designer (died 2001).
- 3 June – J. J. O'Reilly, Cavan Gaelic footballer (died 1952).
- 8 June – Constantine Fitzgibbon, historian and novelist (died 1983).
- 10 June – Kevin O'Flanagan, physician, rugby and association football player, and Olympic official (died 2006).
- 7 July – Fred Kiernan, association football player (died 1981).
- 15 July – Iris Murdoch, novelist and philosopher (died 1999).
- 17 July – John Hemingway, WWII fighter pilot (died 2025).
- 21 July – Roderick Gill, cricketer (died 1983).
- 1 August – Dave Creedon, Cork hurler (died 2007).
- 15 August – Benedict Kiely, writer, broadcaster and journalist (died 2007).
- 15 September – Michael ffrench-O'Carroll, Independent TD and senator (died 2007).
- 2 October – Seán 'ac Dhonncha, traditional singer (died 1996).
- 25 October – Jimmy Rudd, association football player (died 1985).
- 27 October – James Joseph Magennis, British Royal Navy submariner awarded the Victoria Cross for taking part in Operation Struggle in 1945 (died 1986).
- 1 November – Gerard Slevin, Chief Herald of Ireland (died 1997).
- 5 November – Seamus Twomey, twice chief of staff of the Provisional Irish Republican Army (died 1989).
- 15 November – Tony Reddin, Tipperary hurler (died 2015).
- 11 December – Digby McLaren, geologist and palaeontologist in Canada (died 2004).
  Full date unknown
  - Vivian Mercier, literary critic (died 1989).

== Deaths ==
- 9 January – John Danaher, soldier, recipient of the Victoria Cross for gallantry in 1881 near Pretoria, South Africa (born 1860).
- 13 February – William Temple, recipient of the Victoria Cross for gallantry in 1863 at Rangiriri, New Zealand (born 1833).
- 21 February – John O'Connor Power, Irish Nationalist politician and member of parliament (born 1846).
- 6 March – Pierce McCan, member of First Dáil representing East Tipperary.
- 20 March – William Hone, cricketer (born 1842).
- 30 April – John Pentland Mahaffy, classicist (born 1839).
- 8 June – Coslett Herbert Waddell, priest and botanist (born 1858).
- 25 June – William Martin Murphy, Nationalist (Irish Parliamentary Party) member of parliament, newspaper proprietor, leader of employer's syndicate in the Dublin Lockout of 1913 (born 1844).
- 25 July – Samuel McCaughey, pastoralist, politician and philanthropist in Australia (born 1835).
- 5 September – Joseph Ivess, member of the New Zealand House of Representatives (born 1844).
- 31 December – Con Lehane, socialist; active in the Irish Socialist Republican Party, the Social Democratic Federation, and the Socialist Party of Great Britain (born 1877).
  Full date unknown
  - Patrick Egan, treasurer of the Irish Land League, fled to the United States, United States Minister to Chile (born 1841).
