= The Wild Swans at Coole (poem) =

Poem by W. B. Yeats

- by William Butler Yeats
- Written: 1916–1917
- First published in: The Wild Swans at Coole (1917, 1919)
- Meter: iambic, in six-line stanzas of tetrameter (lines 1 and 3), trimeter (lines 2, 4, and 6), and pentameter (lines 5)
- Rhyme scheme: ABCBDD
- Publication date: 1917
- Lines: 30

Full text
- The Wild Swans at Coole (Collection) at Wikisource

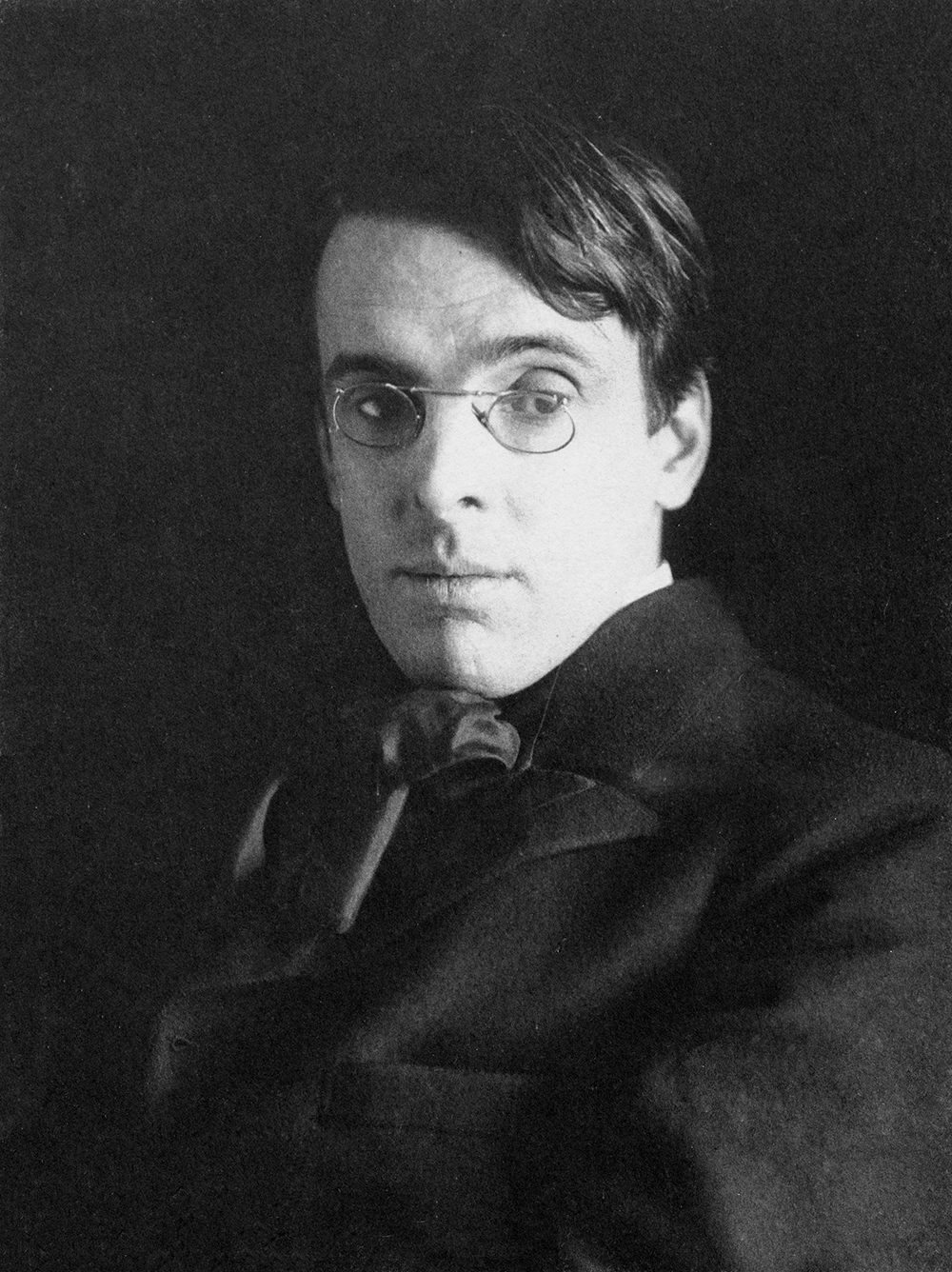
William Butler Yeats

"The Wild Swans at Coole" is a lyric poem by the Irish poet William Butler Yeats (1865–1939). Written between 1916 and early 1917, the poem was first published in the June 1917 issue of the Little Review, and became the title poem in Yeats's 1917 and 1919 collections The Wild Swans at Coole.

It was written during a period when Yeats was staying with his friend Lady Gregory at her home at Coole Park, and the assembled collection was dedicated to her son, Major Robert Gregory (1881–1918), a British airman killed in a friendly fire incident during the First World War. Literary scholar Daniel Tobin writes that Yeats was melancholy and unhappy, reflecting on his advancing age; romantic rejections by both Maud Gonne and her daughter Iseult Gonne; and the ongoing Irish rebellion against the British. Tobin reflects that the poem is about the poet's search for a lasting beauty in a changing world where beauty is mortal and temporary.

== Style and structure ==
The poem has a very regular stanza form: five six-line stanzas, each written in a roughly iambic meter, with the first and third lines in tetrameter, the second, fourth, and sixth lines in trimeter, and the fifth line in pentameter, so that the pattern of stressed syllables in each stanza is 434353. The rhyme scheme in each stanza is ABCBDD.

== Poem ==
The trees are in their autumn beauty,
The woodland paths are dry,
Under the October twilight the water
Mirrors a still sky;
Upon the brimming water among the stones
Are nine-and-fifty swans.

The nineteenth autumn has come upon me
Since I first made my count;
I saw, before I had well finished,
All suddenly mount
And scatter wheeling in great broken rings
Upon their clamorous wings.

I have looked upon those brilliant creatures,
And now my heart is sore.
All's changed since I, hearing at twilight,
The first time on this shore,
The bell-beat of their wings above my head,
Trod with a lighter tread.

Unwearied still, lover by lover,
They paddle in the cold
Companionable streams or climb the air;
Their hearts have not grown old;
Passion or conquest, wander where they will,
Attend upon them still.

But now they drift on the still water,
Mysterious, beautiful;
Among what rushes will they build,
By what lake's edge or pool
Delight men's eyes when I awake some day
To find they have flown away?

== In popular culture ==
In his LP Branduardi canta Yeats (1986), Angelo Branduardi sings an Italian version (I Cigni di Coole) of this poem.

In the popular TV medical drama House, M.D., episode 6 season 1 [21 December 2004], this poem is read to the patient Lucy.

== See also ==
- 1917 in poetry
- 1919 in poetry
