= 1919 in poetry =

Considering that, all hatred driven hence,

The soul recovers radical innocence
And learns at last that it is self-delighting,
Self-appeasing, self-affrighting,
And that its own sweet will is heaven's will;
She can, though every face should scowl
And every windy quarter howl

Or every bellows burst, be happy still.

—From A Prayer for My Daughter by W. B. Yeats, written on the birth of his daughter Anne on February 26

Nationality words link to articles with information on the nation's poetry or literature (for instance, Irish or France).

== Events ==
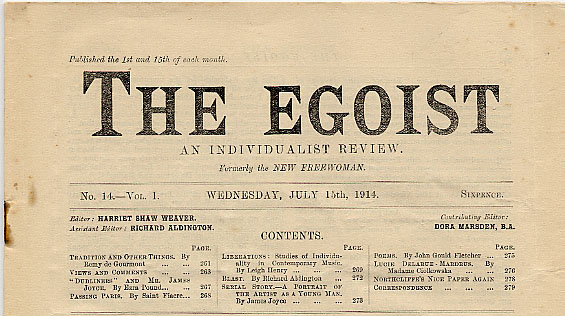
The Egoist goes defunct

- April 2 — Vladimir Nabokov, novelist and poet, leaves Russia with his family.
- October — W. B. Yeats travels to the United States and begins a lecture tour lasting until May, 1920.
- December — The Egoist, a London literary magazine founded by Dora Marsden which published early modernist works, including those of James Joyce, goes defunct.
- Two paintings by E. E. Cummings appear in a show of the New York Society of Independent Artists.
- The journal Littérature founded in France by André Breton, Philippe Soupault and Louis Aragon.
- H.D. (Hilda Doolittle) writes Notes on Thought and Vision, a prose work, published posthumously in 1982.

== Works published in English ==
=== Australia ===
- Edwin James Brady, The House of the Winds
- John Le Gay Brereton, The Burning Marl, dedicated to "All who have fought nobly"
- C. J. Dennis, Jim of the Hills
- Shaw Neilson, Heart of Spring
- John O'Brien, "Said Hanrahan"

=== Canada ===
- Charles G.D. Roberts, New Poems. (London: Constable).

=== India, in English ===
- Swami Ananda Acharya, Snow-birds, London: Macmillan, Indian poetry in English
- Harindranath Chattopadhyaya, The Coloured Garden, Adyar, Madras: The Commonwealth Office; India, Indian poetry in English
- Ardeshir M. Modi, Spring Blossoms, London: Arthur H. Stockwell
- Nanikram Vasanmal Thadani, Krishna's Flute and Other Poems, Bombay: Longmans

=== United Kingdom ===
- Richard Aldington
  - Images of Desire
  - Images of War
- Swami Ananda Acharya, Snow-birds, London: Macmillan, Indian poetry in English
- May Wedderburn Cannan, The Splendid Days
- Eva Dobell, A Bunch of Cotswold Grasses
- Ernest Dowson (died 1900), The Poems and Prose of Ernest Dowson, with a memoir by Arthur Symons
- John Drinkwater, Loyalties
- T. S. Eliot, Ara Vos Prec, including "Gerontion" and the poems later published in Poems – 1920; his "Tradition and the Individual Talent" appears in The Egoist
- Ivor Gurney, War's Embers
- F. W. Harvey, Ducks
- Rudyard Kipling, The Years Between
- C. S. Lewis, writing as Clive Hamilton, Spirits in Bondage: a cycle of lyrics
- Bertram Lloyd, ed., The Paths of Glory: A collection of poems written during the War, 1914–1919
- Rose Macaulay, Three Days
- Carola Oman, The Menin Road, and other poems
- Ezra Pound, Quia Pauper Amavi
- Siegfried Sassoon, The War Poems of Sigfried Sassoon
- Dora Sigerson (posthumous), Sixteen Dead Men, and Other Ballads of Easter Week
- Osbert Sitwell, Argonaut and Juggernaut
- J. C. Squire, The Birds and Other Poems
- W. B. Yeats, Irish poet published in the United Kingdom:
  - The Wild Swans at Coole, significant revision of the 1917 edition: has the poems from the 1917 edition and others, including "An Irish Airman Foresees His Death" and "The Phases of the Moon"; contains: "The Wild Swans at Coole", "Ego Dominus Tuus", "The Scholars" and "On being asked for a War Poem"
  - Two Plays for Dancers, (see also, Four Plays for Dancers, published in 1921)
  - A Prayer For My Daughter, first published in the November issue of Poetry magazine (later published in Michael Robartes and the Dancer in 1921)

=== United States ===
- John Jay Chapman, Songs and Poems
- Babette Deutsch, Banners
- Vachel Lindsay, Bryan, Bryan, Bryan, Bryan, a poem chronicling William Jennings Bryan's 1896 presidential campaign through the eyes of an idealistic sixteen-year-old
- Amy Lowell, Pictures of a Floating World
- Edgar Lee Masters, Starved Rock
- John G. Neihardt, The Song of Three Friends
- Ezra Pound, Quia Pauper Amavi
- John Crowe Ransom, Poems About God
- Charles Reznikoff, Rhythms II, including "The Idiot"
- Louis Untermeyer, editor, Modern American Poetry, New York: Harcourt, Brace and Howe; anthology, more than 130 poems, including "Abraham Lincoln Walks at Midnight", by Vachel Lindsay and verse by Ezra Pound, Sara Teasdale, Stephen Vincent Benét, and Emily Dickinson
- John Hall Wheelock, Dust and Light

== Works published in other languages ==
=== France ===
- Paul Claudel, La Messe là-bas
- Léon-Paul Fargue, Poèmes
- Yvan Goll, ed., Le coeur de l’ennemi: Anthologie de poèmes contre la guerre
- Max Jacob, La Defense de Tartuffe
- Francis Jammes, La Vierge et les sonnets, Paris: Mercure de France
- Pierre Reverdy, La Guitare endormie

=== Indian subcontinent ===
Including all of the British colonies that later became India, Pakistan, Bangladesh, Sri Lanka and Nepal. Listed alphabetically by first name, regardless of surname:

- Ardoshir Faramji Kharbardar, Bharatno Tankar (Parsi writing in Gujarati)
- Basavaraju Appa Rao, Selayeti ganamu, Telugu-language
- Duvvuri Rami Reddi, Krsivaludu, has been called the most prominent poem of the Telugu-language romantic movement; depicts peasants and rural life
- Gopala Krishna Pattanayak, Gopalakrsna Padyabali, Oriya-language, vaishnav lyrics, posthumous edition
- Jammuneshwar Khataniyar, Arun, her first collection of poems, Indian, Assamese-language
- Kumaran Asan, Malayalam-language:
  - Cintavistayaya Sita ("Sita's Story"),
  - Prarodanam, elegy on the death of A. R. Rajara Varma, a poet, critic and scholar; similar to Percy Bysshe Shelley's Adonais but with a distinctly Indian philosophical attitude
- Nilkanth Sharma Dal, Ramayana, Kashmiri-language poem based for the most part on the Ramacarita-Manas of Tulsidas
- Syama Sundara Das, editor, Parmala Raso, Hindi-language epic poem; written in a language mixing Brjibhasa, Kannauji and Bundeli, published by Kashi Nagari Pracharini Sabha

=== Spanish language ===
==== Spain ====
- Juan Ramón Jiménez, Piedra y cielo ("Stone and Sky"), Spain
- Ramón del Valle Inclán, La pipa de Kif ("Kif's Pipe"), Spain

==== Latin America ====
- Alfonsina Storni, Without Remedy, Argentina

=== Other languages ===
- António Botto, Cantares, Portugal
- Khalil Gibran, The Procession, long ode, Arabic
- Charles Gill, Le Cap Éternité: suivi des Étoiles filantes, French language, Canada
- Uri Zvi Greenberg, In tsaytns roysh ("In the tumult of the times"), verse and prose, Yiddish published in Austria-Hungary
- Kitahara Kakushu, Heretics, Japan
- Angiolo Silvio Novaro, Il Fabbro armonioso ("The Harmonious Blacksmith"), Italy
- Kurt Pinthus, editor, Menschheitsdämmerung ("The Twilight of Mankind"), anthology of Expressionist poetry, published in Berlin, Germany
- Anton Schnack, Strophen der Gier ("Verses of greed"), Der Abenteurer ("The adventurer") and Die tausend Gelächter ("The thousand laughs"), Germany
- Kurt Schwitters, "An Anna Blume" ("To Anna Flower" also translated as "To Eve Blossom"), widely noticed and controversial work variously described as a parody of a love poem, an emblem of the chaos and madness of the era, and as a harbinger of a new poetic language; much parodied; originally published in August in Der Sturm magazine, then later in the year in Schwitters' book, Anna Blume, Dichtungen, published by Verlag Paul Steegemann, Hannover (revised edition 1922), Germany
- Edith Sodergran, Gaudy Observations, Sweden
- August Stramm, Tropfblut, Germany, posthumous
- Giuseppe Ungaretti, Allegria di naufragi ("The Joy of Shipwrecks") and La guerra ("The War"), Italy

== Awards and honors ==
- Nobel Prize in Literature: Carl Friedrich Georg Spitteler, Swiss poet and novelist
- Pulitzer Prize for Poetry: Margaret Widdemer, Old Road to Paradise and Carl Sandburg, Corn Huskers

== Births ==
Death years link to the corresponding "[year] in poetry" article:

- January 7 – Robert Duncan (died 1988), American poet associated with the Black Mountain poets and the Beat Generation, and a key player in the San Francisco Renaissance
- January 9 – William Morris Meredith, Jr. (died 2007), American poet
- January 14
  - Kaifi Azmi (died 2002), Indian, Hindi- and Urdu-language poet lyricist and songwriter
  - Syed Abdul Malik (died 2000), Indian, Assamese-language short-story writer and poet
- January 19 – Joan Brossa (died 1998), Spanish Catalan poet
- January 20 – Silva Kaputikyan (died 2006), Armenian poet
- February 12 – Subhash Mukhopadhyay (died 2003), Bengali poet and Marxist (surname: Mukhopadhyay)
- March 17 – Abdul Rahman Pazhwak, عبدالرحمن پژواک (died 1995), Afghan, Pashto-language poet, novelist, playwright and diplomat
- March 24 – Lawrence Ferlinghetti, born Lawrence Ferling (died 2021), American Beat poet, painter and co-founder of City Lights Bookstore and publisher
- April 15 – Emyr Humphreys (died 2020), Welsh novelist, playwright and poet
- April 17 – J. Rodolfo Wilcock (died 1978), Argentine-born author, poet and translator
- May 28 – May Swenson (died 1989), American poet and playwright
- June 7 – Mira Schendel, born Myrrha Dub (died 1988), Swiss-Brazilian modernist artist and poet
- July 19 – Miltos Sachtouris, Μίλτος Σαχτούρης (died 2005), Greek
- August 30 – Jiří Orten, born Jiří Ohrenstein (died 1941), Czech
- August 31 – Amrita Pritam (died 2005), Punjabi poet and novelist; a woman
- September 2 – Binod Chandra Nayak, Indian, Oriya-language poet
- September 3 – Edwin Honig (died 2011), American poet, critic and translator known for his English renditions of seminal works of Spanish and Portuguese literature
- September 7 – Louise Bennett-Coverley, aka "Miss Lou" (died 2006), Jamaican folklorist, writer and poet
- September 18 – M. Govindan (died 1988), Indian, Malayalam-language poet, short-story writer, playwright and essayist
- September 23 – Tōta Kaneko (died 2018), Japanese haiku poet
- September 26 – Matilde Camus (died 2012), Spanish poet and researcher
- September 29 – Ruth Dallas, born Ruth Mumford (died 2008), New Zealand poet
- October 1 – G. D. Madgulkar (died 1978), Indian, Marathi-language poet, songwriter and short-story writer
- November 4 – Patricia Beer (died 1999), English poet and critic
- November 11 – Hamish Henderson (died 2002), Scottish poet, folk song collector and soldier
- November 18 – Madeline DeFrees (died 2015), American poet
- Also:
  - Lance Jeffers (died 1985), African American
  - Michalis Katsaros (died 1998), Greek
  - Kuroda Saburu, Japanese (surname: Kuroda)
  - Bani Ray, Bengali writer, novelist, poet and critic, a woman
  - Buddhidhari Singha, Maithili-language poet and fiction writer
  - Girija Kumar Mathur (died 1994), Indian, Hindi-language poet
  - Yoshioka Minoru (died 1990), Japanese (surname: Yoshioka)

== Deaths ==
Death years link to the corresponding "[year] in poetry" article:

- January 4 – Matilda Betham-Edwards (born 1836), English novelist, travel writer, poet and children's book author
- January 15 – Benjamin Paul Blood (born 1832), American philosopher and poet
- January 19 – Gladys Cromwell (born 1885), American poet, suicide at sea
- January 23 – Ram Ganesh Gadkari, writing poetry as Govindagraj (born 1885), Indian, Marathi-language poet, playwright and humorist
- January 27 – Endre Ady (born 1877), Hungarian
- February 5 – William Michael Rossetti (born 1839), English poet and essayist
- May 24 – Amado Nervo (died 1870), Mexican
- August 31 – Jóhann Sigurjónsson (born 1880), Icelandic playwright and poet
- October 6 – Ricardo Palma (born 1833), Peruvian novelist, playwright, poet, essayist and writer of short fiction
- October 30 – Ella Wheeler Wilcox (born 1850), American
- December 22 – Sarah Morgan Bryan Piatt (born 1836), American
- Also:
  - Akshay Kumar Boral (born 1860), Indian, Bengali-language poet
  - Brij Raj (born 1847), Indian, Dogri-Pahadi Brajbhasha poet
  - Ganesh Janardan Agasha (born 1852), Indian, Marathi-language poet and literary critic
  - Narayan Waman Tilak (born 1861), Indian, Marathi-language Christian poet

== See also ==
- Poetry
- List of years in poetry
