= Blood and the Moon =

Poem by William Butler Yeats

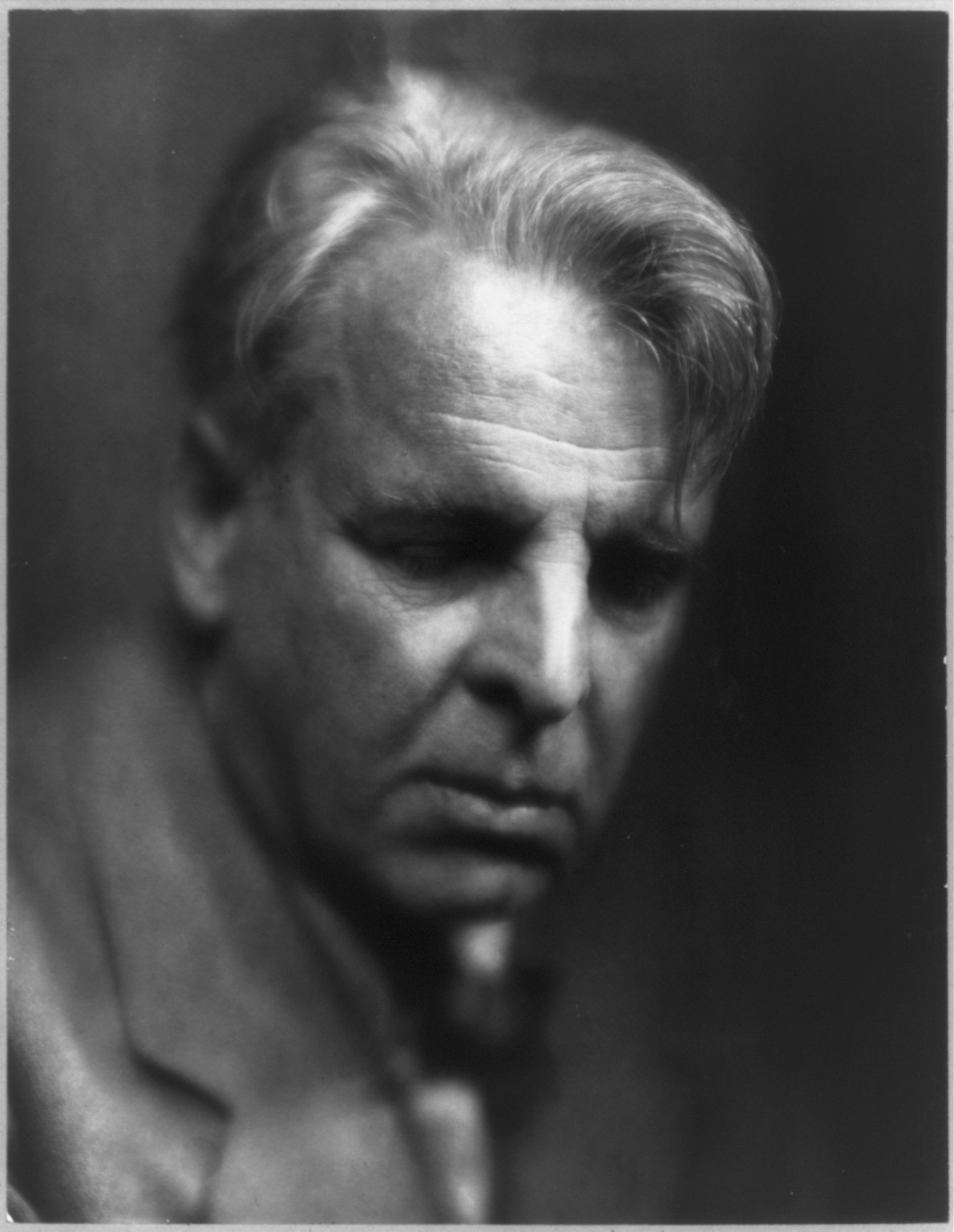
Photograph of William Butler Yeats taken in 1933

Blood and the Moon is a poem by Irish poet William Butler Yeats written in 1927. It was first published in the Spring 1928 issue of The Exile and then in the collection The Winding Stair in 1929, before being reprinted in The Winding Stair and Other Poems in 1933. Yeats composed the poem in response to the 1927 assassination of Kevin O'Higgins, the Vice-President of the Free State, whom Yeats had known personally. The poem contains many themes common in Yeats's poems from the 1920s including the "tower", a reference to Thoor Ballylee, which had been the title of a collection of works printed the year before "Blood and the Moon" was published, as well as the "gyre" which had been a major focus of his 1920 poem "The Second Coming".

== Background ==
The murder of Kevin O'Higgins acted as a catalyst for Yeats's creation of the poem. As Vice President and Minister of Home Affairs in the Cosgrave Government, O'Higgins had enforced the Army Emergency Powers Act and condemned seventy-seven Republican "irregulars", including author Erskine Childers and many men with whom O'Higgins had been allies during the Irish War of Independence. O'Higgins was assassinated by a Republican gunman on 10 July 1927. When Yeats heard the news that O'Higgins had been murdered, he refused to eat and spent his evening walking along the streets until the sun set.

Thoor Ballylee, Yeats's poetic model for the poem's tower, was a 16th-Century Norman castle in the Barony of Kiltartan, Ireland. The building was originally called "Islandmore Castle" and "Ballylee Castle", yet Yeats changed the name when he purchased the building in 1917 for £35. Yeats believed that the word "castle" was too magnificent and used the word "Thoor" instead as it was an anglicisation of the Irish for "tower", 'túr'. Yeats credits the landmark as being the inspiration for the poem's setting. At the top of the tower was a waste room, which inspired the image of the empty room discussed in lines 8-12:

In mockery I have set
A powerful emblem up,
And sing it rhyme upon rhyme
In mockery of a time
Half dead at the top.

At the time that Yeats purchased the tower, it had seventy-three stairs that are described in lines 16-18 of the poem:

I declare this tower is my symbol; I declare
This winding, gyring, spiring treadmill of a stair is my ancestral stair;
That Goldsmith and the Dean, Berkeley and Burke have travelled there.

The castle consisted of four stories. On the first floor was the dining room, and the living room was found on the second. The third story contained the bedroom, and the top story contained the "Strangers' room" which and a secret room. It was also on this story that the tower's large windows opened up over the millstream below. The windows are mentioned in the poem on lines 43-46:

Upon the dusty, glittering windows cling,
And seem to cling upon the moonlit skies,
Tortoiseshell butterflies, peacock butterflies,
A couple of night-moths are on the wing.

== Structure ==
The poem is arranged in four stanzas that lack symmetry and vary in size and structure. The first stanza contains three quatrains with a rhyme scheme of ABBA, which contain no breaks between the lines. The second stanza contains 18 lines of text with six long-lined tercets using a rhyme scheme of AAA, which causes it to appear very different on the page from the stanzas that precede and follow it. The third stanza is a douzain, a square block of twelve lines of verse composed of pentameter quatrains with a rhyme scheme of ABBA. The fourth and final stanza repeats the structure of the one that precedes it.

Yeats explained the structure by suggesting that the poem is arranged on the page to visually represent the images described in the text. The first stanza represents the tower introduced in line 2. He claims to have composed these lines so that they would look long and slender on the page to achieve the outline of the tower's structure. The second stanza represents the "winding, gyring, spiring treadmill of a stair" mentioned in line 17, which would account for the fact that the stanza lacks symmetry among its lines, which appear to extend to various lengths across the page in a way not seen in the other stanzas. Stanzas three and four, identical in form and appearance on the page, represent two ways of looking at the tower windows. Stanza three represents the windows "glittering" from the light of the moon passing through the glass, and stanza four represents the "dusty" inside surface upon which the trapped butterflies cling.

== Themes ==
According to literary critic Northrop Frye, "Blood and the Moon" attempts to portray the achievements of a civilization using allegory, describing the top of the tower that society builds as being an area of death and decay. In the poem, the butterflies that reach the top of the tower are unable to escape through the window and are littered around the room. The second stanza is devoted to describing other methods that poets had used to try to explain the attempt of artists to build their own towers to elevate civilization through poetry only to find, Jonathan Swift in particular, themselves dragged "down into mankind".

The contrasting elements of the blood described in line 3 and the "purity" of the unclouded Moon in line 30 represents a major theme of the work. The Moon's surface appears unchanging and contrasts with the Earth that has been stained with the blood of men as the result of "arrogant power". As the poem speaks of the pristine nature of the Moon's surface in the third stanza Helen Vendler suggests that it broadens the contrast between the two surfaces to highlight the difference between "the mortal and the incorruptible". However, she also states that the poem's theme of life and death shifts focus in the final stanza as the poet discusses the trapped butterflies, which "brings into view the pathos of life, rather than its violence".

== Critical response ==
In his book Yeats, critic Harold Bloom describes the poem as being splendid, though theatrical, suggesting that the second stanza is the only part of the poem that fails to achieve its objective, calling it a "pseudo-Swiftian rant". Vendler also comments on the stanza, suggesting that the fact that it is the only one to have breaks between the lines as well as the incongruity of its form in relation to the others. Bloom, however, uses the problem with the second stanza to show that the poem has flaws that do not exist in other works Yeats wrote in the same period, suggesting that while the poem is "honest", the "strength is not there".
