= Song of the Old Mother =

Poem by William Butler Yeats

"Song of the Old Mother" is a poem by William Butler Yeats that first appeared in his The Wind Among the Reeds anthology, published in 1899. The poem echoes Yeats' fascination with aging, although he was only in his thirties when he wrote it. It is a stylized, dramatic poem written in a "consciously aesthetic" manner.

Written in first person from the perspective of an old Irish peasant woman, the poem describes the hard, unending work of the old woman and contrasts it with the experiences of the young, who work less and have pettier concerns. It is written in pentameter, in couplets.

The actual subject of the poem is the intersection of aging and sexuality. According to the University of Buckingham, the "seed of the fire" in lines 2 and 10 represents the old woman's sexuality: she is "in one sense, beyond sex and having children" but "in another sense, she still has strong sexual feelings." The young, in contrast, are portrayed dreaming of flirting and courtship, as they "lie long and dream in their bed." While the line describing the idleness of the use appears on the surface to be the old woman calling them lazy, it actually is intended to help paint a picture of what youth is like, showing that the old woman herself was once young.

"Tress" in the poem refers to a "tress of hair", and care for appearance.

== Full text ==
The full poem is as follows:

I rise in the dawn, and I kneel and blow
Till the seed of the fire flicker and glow;
And then I must scrub and bake and sweep
Till stars are beginning to blink and peep;
And the young lie long and dream in their bed
Of the matching of ribbons for bosom and head,
And their days go over in idleness,
And they sigh if the wind but lift a tress:
While I must work because I am old,
And the seed of the fire gets feeble and cold.

== See also ==
- 1899 in poetry
- List of works by William Butler Yeats
