= Nobel Prize medal =

Gold medal given to recipients of Nobel Prizes

Obverse, showing Alfred Nobel in profile and the years of his birth and death in Roman numerals

The Nobel Prize medal is a gold medal given to recipients of the Nobel Prizes of Chemistry, Literature, Peace, Physics and Physiology or Medicine since 1901. The medal for the Nobel Memorial Prize in Economic Sciences, given since 1968, is awarded with the aforementioned prizes.

The medals are struck in 18-carat green gold plated with 24-carat gold and weigh about 175 grams (0.386 lb) each, with the exception of the Economic prize medal which weighs 185g.

The recipients also receive a diploma that details their achievements, and a monetary award from the Nobel Foundation. The voting members of the Royal Swedish Academy of Sciences, the Nobel Assembly at the Karolinska Institute, and the Swedish Academy receive smaller replicas of the prize medals. The chemistry, literature, physics, and physiology or medicine prizes are known as the 'Swedish medals'.

== Design ==
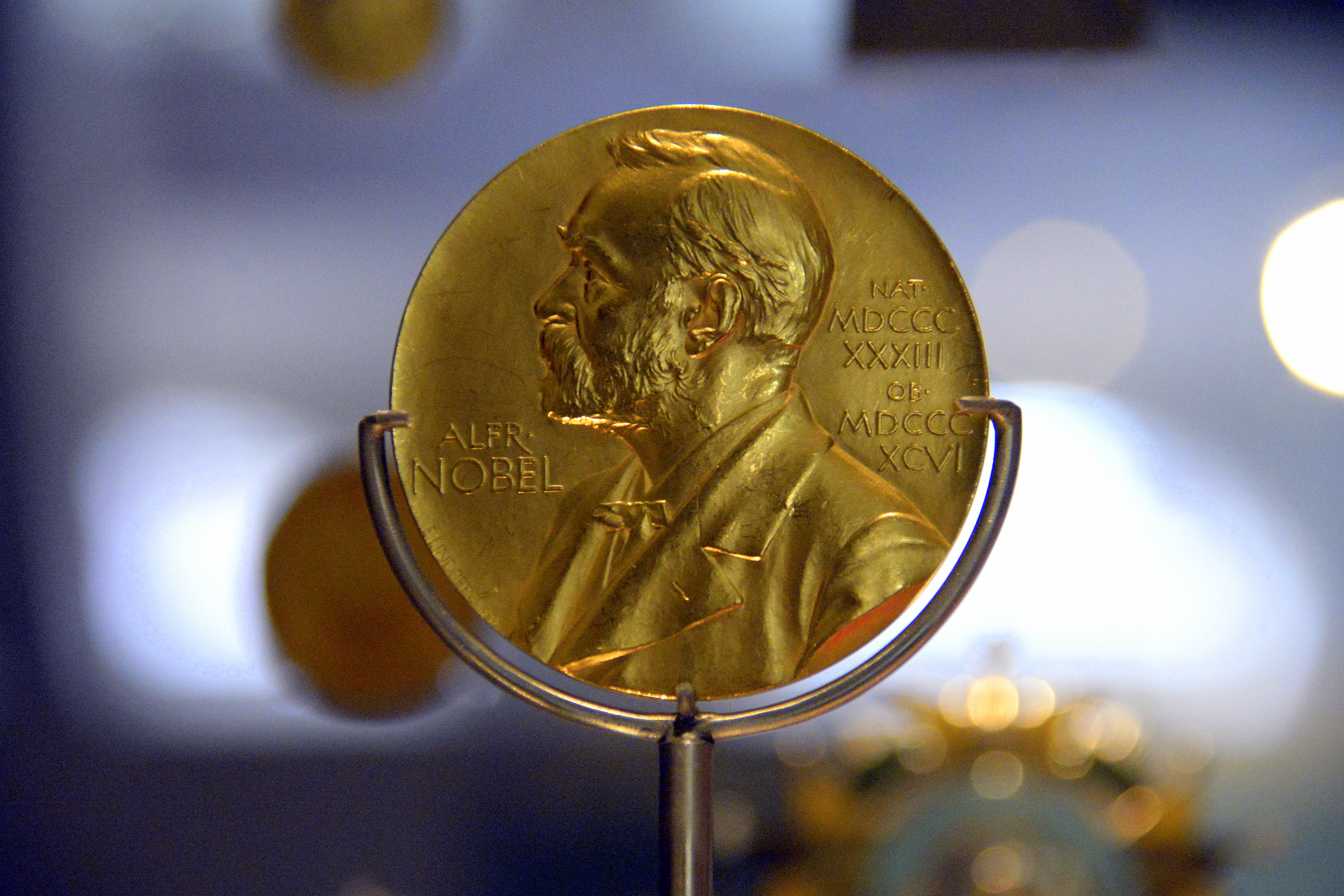
Lindberg's portrait of Alfred Nobel on Alexander Fleming's 1945 medal for Medicine

Each medal has a portrait of Alfred Nobel in left profile on the obverse. The medals for Chemistry, Literature, Physics, and Physiology or Medicine have identical obverses, showing the image of Nobel and the years of his birth and death. Nobel's portrait also appears on the obverse of the Peace Prize medal and the Economics Prize medal, but with a slightly different portrait. The names of the chemistry, medicine, literature and physics prize recipients are engraved on the reverse of the medal on a small plate. The names of the peace and economic prize recipients are engraved on the edges of their medals. The Chemistry, Literature, Physics, and Physiology or Medicine medals were designed by Erik Lindberg. The Peace prize medal was designed by Gustav Vigeland, and the Economics prize medal by Gunvor Svensson-Lundqvist.

The inaugural Nobel laureates of 1901 received a 'temporary' medal that was struck in a lesser metal than gold. The first medals were eventually struck in September 1902. The delay was due to the designs needing to be approved by each respective awarding institution. The medals were designed by the sculptor Erik Lindberg.

Between 1902 and 2010 the Nobel Prize medals were struck by the Myntverket, the Swedish royal mint, located in Eskilstuna. In 2011 the medals were made by Det Norske Myntverket in Kongsberg. The medals have been made by Svenska Medalj in Eskilstuna since 2012 with the exception of the peace prize medal which is made by the Det Norske Myntverket.

=== Physics and Chemistry ===
The medals for the Nobel Prizes in Physics and Chemistry are identical in design. They are given by the Royal Swedish Academy of Sciences. The reverse of the medal depicts the Goddess of Nature in the form of Isis as she emerges from clouds holding a cornucopia. The Genius of Science holds the veil which covers Nature's 'cold and austere face'. It was designed by Erik Lindberg and is manufactured by Svenska Medalj in Eskilstuna. It is inscribed "Inventas vitam iuvat excoluisse per artes" ("It is beneficial to have improved (human) life through discovered arts") an adaptation of "Inventas aut qui vitam excoluere per artes" from line 663 from book 6 of the Aeneid by the Roman poet Virgil. A plate below the figures is inscribed with the name of the recipient. The text "REG. ACAD. SCIENT. SUEC." denoting the Royal Swedish Academy of Sciences is inscribed on the reverse.

=== Physiology or Medicine ===
The 1950 Nobel Physiology and Medicine Prize of Philip S. Hench.

The medal for the Nobel Prize in Physiology or Medicine is given by the Nobel Assembly at the Karolinska Institute. The reverse of the medal depicts the 'Genius of Medicine holding an open book in her lap, collecting the water pouring out from a rock in order to quench a sick girl's thirst'. It is inscribed "Inventas vitam iuvat excoluisse per artes" ("It is beneficial to have improved (human) life through discovered arts") an adaptation of "inventas aut qui vitam excoluere per artes" from line 663 from book 6 of the Aeneid by the Roman poet Virgil. A plate below the figures is inscribed with the name of the recipient. The text "REG. UNIVERSITAS MED. CHIR. CAROL." denoting the Karolinska Institute is also inscribed on the reverse. It was designed by Erik Lindberg and is manufactured by Svenska Medalj in Eskilstuna.

=== Literature ===
The medal for the Nobel Prize in Literature is given by the Swedish Academy. The reverse of the medal depicts a ' ... young man sitting under a laurel tree who, enchanted, listens to and writes down the song of the Muse'. The 1923 recipient of the literature medal, W. B. Yeats wrote in his 1925 book The Bounty of Sweden that the medal was " ... charming, decorative, academic design, French in manner, a work of the nineties. It shows a young man listening to a Muse, who stands young and beautiful with a great lyre in her hand, and I think as I examine it, 'I was good-looking once like that young man, but my unpractised verse was full of infirmity, my Muse old as it were; and now I am old and rheumatic, and nothing to look at, but my Muse is young". It is inscribed "Inventas vitam iuvat excoluisse per artes" ("It is beneficial to have improved (human) life through discovered arts") an adaptation of "inventas aut qui vitam excoluere per artes" from line 663 from book 6 of the Aeneid by the Roman poet Virgil. A plate below the figures is inscribed with the name of the recipient. The text "ACAD. SUEC." denoting the Swedish Academy is also inscribed on the reverse. It was designed by Erik Lindberg and is manufactured by Svenska Medalj in Eskilstuna.

=== Peace ===
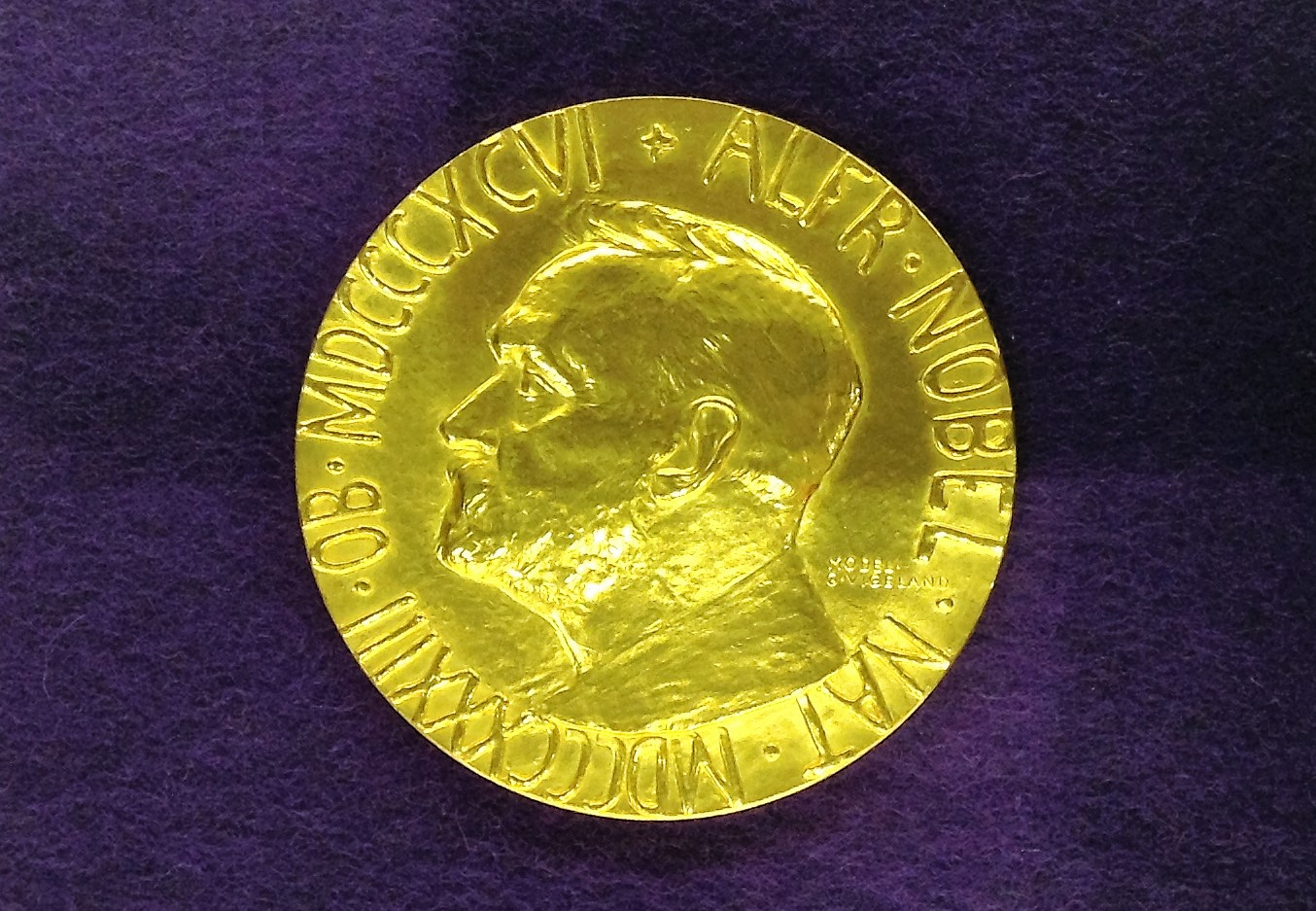
The 1974 Nobel Peace Prize of Eisaku Satō.

The medal for the Nobel Peace Prize was designed by the Norwegian sculptor Gustav Vigeland in 1901. Vigeland's profile sculpture of Alfred Nobel differs from Lindberg's. The dies for Vigeland's peace medal were made by Lindberg as Vigeland was not an engraver. The reverse of the medal features three men in a 'fraternal bond' and the inscription 'Pro pace et fraternitate gentium' ("For the peace and brotherhood of men"). The edge of the medal is inscribed with the year of its awarding, with the name of its recipient and "Prix Nobel de la Paix".

=== Economic Sciences ===
The medal for the Nobel Memorial Prize in Economic Sciences was designed by Gunvor Svensson-Lundqvist in 1968. The obverse of the medal depicts Alfred Nobel and the words "Sveriges Riksbank till Alfred Nobels Minne 1968" ("The Sveriges Riksbank, in memory of Alfred Nobel, 1968") with the symbol of the Sveriges Riksbank, the horn of plenty, displayed below. The name of the recipient is inscribed on the edge of the medal. The reverse features the emblem of the Royal Swedish Academy of Sciences, the North Star, in a design from 1815. "Kungliga Vetenskaps Akademien" ("The Royal Swedish Academy of Sciences") is inscribed around the edge of the star. It is the only medal without a quotation on its reverse. Since 2012 the economics medal has been manufactured by Svenska Medalj in Eskilstuna.

== Composition ==
The medals are struck in 18 carat green gold plated with 24 carat gold. All medals made before 1980 were struck in 23 carat gold. The weight of each medal varies with the value of gold, but averages about 175 grams (0.386 lb) for each medal, with the exception of the Nobel Memorial Prize in Economic Sciences which weighs 185g. The diameter is 66 millimetres (2.6 in) and the thickness varies between 5.2 millimetres (0.20 in) and 2.4 millimetres (0.094 in).

During World War II, the medals of German scientists Max von Laue and James Franck were sent to Copenhagen for safekeeping. When Germany invaded Denmark, Hungarian chemist (and Nobel laureate himself) George de Hevesy dissolved them in aqua regia (nitro-hydrochloric acid), to prevent confiscation by Nazi Germany and to prevent legal problems for the holders. After the war, the gold was recovered from solution, and the medals re-cast.

== Ownership ==
The Nobel Institute places no restrictions on the ownership of the medal and the accompanying diploma and prize money once it has been awarded to the recipient. If the recipient chooses not to keep them, they may be sold, donated, or given away. The dedicatee cannot be changed and the prizes cannot be revoked.

== List of donations, gifts and loans of medals ==
Laureate	Image	Category and Year	Details
Kofi Annan		Peace, 2001	Annan's widow, Nane Annan, donated his medal and diploma to the office of the United Nations in Geneva, Switzerland, as she wished to continue his legacy of inspiring future generations.
James Black		Physiology or Medicine, 1988	Donated to the National Museum of Scotland in 2009.
Hans Bethe		Physics, 1960	Donated to Cornell University by Bethe's family in 2022.
Felix Bloch		Physics, 1952	Donated to CERN by Bloch's family in 2025.
Carl and Gerty Cori		Physiology or Medicine, 1947	In 2016 Thomas Cori, the son of Carl and Gerty Cori, donated his parents' medals to the Washington University School of Medicine where they are on display in the Becker Medical Library.
John L. Hall		Physics, 2005	Donated to University of Colorado Boulder by Hall in 2018.
Knut Hamsun		Literature, 1920	Hamsun donated his medal to the Nazi German Reich Minister of Propaganda Joseph Goebbels after meeting him in 1943. The present location of the medal is unknown.
Antony Hewish		Physics, 1974	Donated to Churchill College, Cambridge by Hewish's family and his widow Marjorie upon his Hewish's death in 2021.
Peter Higgs		Physics, 2013	Higgs left his medal in his will to Edinburgh University where he was a researcher at the time of work in the discovery of the Higgs boson.
Christian Lous Lange		Peace, 1921	Since 2005 Lange's medal has been on long-term loan from his family to the Nobel Peace Center in Oslo, Norway. It is displayed in the centre's Medal Chamber.
Tsung-Dao Lee		Physics, 1957	Lee's son, James, donated his father's medal to Shanghai Jiao Tong University in 2014 where it is on display in the Tsung-Dao Lee Library.
María Corina Machado		Peace, 2025	On 16 January 2026 Machado presented her medal to the President of the United States, Donald Trump, "in recognition [of] his unique commitment [to] our freedom" following the United States intervention in Venezuela earlier that month. Trump described the presentation as being "for the work I have done" and that it was a "wonderful gesture of mutual respect".
Harry Markowitz		Economics, 1990	Markowitz donated his medal and diploma to the Geisel Library of the University of California, San Diego in 2018 due to his "love for the campus and the joy he gets out of teaching" at the Rady School of Management.
Peter Medawar		Physiology or Medicine, 1960	In 2024 Medawar's family donated his medal to the University of Oxford.
Dale T. Mortensen		Economics, 2010	Donated to Northwestern University by Mortensen's family in 2019.
Yoshinori Ohsumi		Physiology or Medicine, 2016	In 2024 Ohsumi donated his medal and diploma to the Institute of Science Tokyo to "serve as a strong stimulus for young researchers who seek to create the future".
Wolfgang Pauli		Physics, 1945	Donated to CERN by Pauli's widow, Franca, as part of Pauli's personal archives in 1960 and 1971.
Aziz Sancar		Chemistry, 2015	On 19 May 2016 Sancar donated his medal to Anıtkabir, the mausoleum of Mustafa Kemal Atatürk, in a ceremony attended by the President of Turkey, Recep Tayyip Erdoğan. This was the 97th anniversary of Atatürk initiating the Turkish War of Independence.
Vernon L. Smith		Economics, 2002	Donated to Chapman University in 2009.
David Thouless		Physics, 2016	The family of Thouless donated his medal to Trinity Hall college of the University of Cambridge where it is on display to inspire students.
Lech Wałęsa		Peace, 1983	Wałęsa donated his medal to the Jasna Góra Monastery in Częstochowa, Poland, a few days after his wife accepted the prize on his behalf in 1983.

== List of thefts of medals ==
Laureate	Image	Category and Year	Year of theft	Detail of theft	Status
Ernest Hemingway		Literature, 1954	1986	Hemingway donated his Nobel medal to the Catholic Church in Cuba, specifically to the Marian shrine of Our Lady of Charity at the Basílica Santuario Nacional de Nuestra Señora de la Caridad del Cobre. It was stolen in 1986. Raúl Castro reportedly told the thieves 'Return the medal within 72 hours or face the consequences. I know who you are'. The medal was subsequently recovered.	Recovered.
Rabindranath Tagore		Literature, 1913	2004	Stolen in 2004 from a museum in West Bengal. In 2016, a local singer accused of sheltering the thieves was arrested, but the medal could not be recovered. Interrogation revealed that a Bangladeshi national, along with two Europeans, were involved in the theft. Two replicas, one in gold and one in silver were later presented to Viswa Bharati University by the Swedish government. Tagore's medal remained missing as of 2024, the Chief Minister of West Bengal, Mamata Banerjee, described the failure of police to find the medal as "big insult" for the people of Bengal.	Missing as of 2024
Ernest O. Lawrence		Physics, 1939	2007	Stolen in 2007 from the E. O. Lawrence Memorial Room at the Lawrence Hall of Science at the University of California, Berkeley where it had been on display. It was recovered a few days later and a student working as a janitor at the hall was arrested.	Recovered, currently on display at the Lawrence Hall of Science at the University of California, Berkeley
Yasser Arafat		Peace, 1994	2007	Stolen in June 2007.	Unknown
Desmond Tutu		Peace, 1984	2007	Stolen in June 2007 from his home in Johannesburg and recovered a week later.	Recovered a week after theft.
Shirin Ebadi		Peace, 2003	2009	In October 2009 Ebadi's medal was taken from her bank box alongside her Légion d'honneur and a ring she had received from Germany's association of journalists. She said they had been taken by Iran's Revolutionary Court. Ebadi also said her bank account was frozen by authorities. The Norwegian Minister of Foreign Affairs Jonas Gahr Støre expressed his "shock and disbelief" at the incident. The Iranian foreign ministry subsequently denied the confiscation, and also criticized Norway for interfering in Iran's affairs.	Unknown
Arthur Henderson		Peace, 1934	2013	Stolen in a burglary of the office of the Lord Mayor of Newcastle on 3 April 2013. A man was subsequently jailed for the theft; the medal has never been recovered.	Unknown
Kailash Satyarthi		Peace, 2014	2017	Stolen in February 2017 and subsequently recovered.	Recovered
F. W. de Klerk		Peace, 1993	2022	Stolen from his home in November 2022.	Unknown

== List of sales of medals ==
Laureate	Image	Category and Year	Year of Sale	Details	Price
Norman Angell		Peace, 1933	1983	Sold at auction at Sotheby's, London, in 1983. Now in the collection of the Imperial War Museum, London.	$12,000 (equivalent to $38,791 in 2025)
Niels Bohr		Physics, 1922	1940	Sold alongside the medal of 1920 physiology or medicine recipient August Krogh on 12 March 1940 to raise funds for the Fund for Finnish Relief (Finlandshjälpen) during World War II. Subsequently, donated to the Danish Historical Museum of Fredrikborg.	
Aage Bohr		Physics, 1975	2019	Sold at Heritage Auctions in April 2019. Previously sold at Bruun Rasmussen Auction in November 2011.	$90,000 (equivalent to $113,335 in 2025)
Francis Crick		Medicine, 1962	2013	Sold at Heritage Auctions in June 2013 to Jack Wang, the CEO of Chinese medical company Biomobie. The diploma that Crick received from the Nobel prize committee was sold with the medal. 20% of the sale price of the medal was donated to the Francis Crick Institute in London.	$2,270,000 (equivalent to $3,137,464 in 2025)
William Cremer		Peace, 1903	1985	Sold at auction at Sotheby's, London in November 1985.	$16,750 (equivalent to $50,141 in 2025)
William Faulkner		Literature, 1949	2013	Put up for auction at Sotheby's in New York on 11 June 2013, the medal was withdrawn from sale after it failed to reach the pre-sale estimate of $500,000.	
Walter Kohn		Chemistry, 1998	2022	Sold at auction at Noonans, London, in January 2022.	$457,531
August Krogh		Physiology or medicine, 1920	1940	Sold alongside the medal of 1922 physics recipient Niels Bohr on 12 March 1940 to raise funds for the Fund for Finnish Relief (Finlandshjälpen) during World War II. Subsequently, donated to the Danish Historical Museum of Fredrikborg.	
Carlos Saavedra Lamas		Peace, 1936	2014	Sold at auction at Stacks Bowers, Baltimore, Maryland in March 2014.	$1,116,250 (equivalent to $1,518,094 in 2025)
Maurice Maeterlinck		Literature, 1911	2013	Failed to sell at Sotheby's on 1 March 2023 for a pre-sale estimate of €90-120,000.	
Archer Martin		Chemistry, 1952	2023	Sold at auction at Noonans, London, in February 2023.	£150,000
Dmitry Muratov		Peace, 2021	2022	Sold at Heritage Auctions on 21 June 2022 for $103,500,000 to an unidentified phone bidder from New York. The proceeds from the sale were donated to UNICEF to help children affected by the Russian invasion of Ukraine.	$103,500,000
George A. Olah		Chemistry, 1994	2023	Sold on 23 January 2023 for $250,000.	$250,000
James Watson		Medicine, 1962	2014	Sold by Christie's on 5 December 2014 for $4,800,000. This was the first medal sold by a living recipient. Watson said that he sold the medal due to his ostracisation from the scientific community after his comments about race and intelligence. It was bought by Russian oligarch Alisher Usmanov, who subsequently returned the medal to Watson.	$4,800,000 (equivalent to $6,527,973 in 2025)
Georg Wittig		Chemistry, 1979	2016	Sold in 2016 at Heritage Auctions for $274,000 with Wittig's Paul Karrer Gold Medal from Universitat Zurich, the Otto Hahn Prize for Chemistry and Physics, the Roger Adams Medal given by the American Chemical Society and the Adolf Von Baeyer Medal.	$274,000 (equivalent to $367,575 in 2025)
Leon M. Lederman		Physics, 1988	2015	Sold in 2015 for $765,002 to cover medical expenses after being diagnosed for dementia.	$765,002 (equivalent to $1,039,084 in 2025)
