= The Winding Stair and Other Poems =

Poetry collection by William Butler Yeats

First edition (1933)

The Winding Stair is a volume of poems by Irish poet W. B. Yeats, published in September 1933. It was the next new volume after 1928's The Tower. The title poem was originally published in 1929 by Fountain Press in a signed limited edition, which is exceedingly rare.

The title is linked to the staircase in an old Norman tower in County Galway which Yeats bought and gave it the Gaelicized name Thoor Ballylee castle; Yeats would spend the summers there for about a decade, beginning in 1919. He saw the castle as a vital connection to the aristocratic Irish past which he admired. This volume capitalizes on the symbolic potential of the tower while examining the tower from the convoluted spaces within it.

The Tower and The Winding Stair are two collections which are carefully parallel with opposing points of view. The two volumes and their poems share the complementary symbols of Thoor Ballylee and the winding stair within. Six of the poems in the latter volume were written before the publication of the former, therefore they are often discussed as a single unit. In a complete turnaround from his bleak outlook of eternity expressed in his previous volume (the poet admitted that he was "astonished at its bitterness"), Yeats now ponders over the possibility and desire of reincarnation after death. Yeats was in poor health during this period; in a letter to Olivia Shakespear, he admitted, "Perhaps if I was in better health I should be content to be bitter". Though this volume includes more poems than The Tower, its contents are generally less well-known and thus less frequently anthologized. Among the best-known and anthologized are "A Dialogue of Self and Soul" and "Byzantium."

== "Byzantium" ==
"Byzantium" is a sequel to "Sailing to Byzantium" (from The Tower), meant to better explain the ideas of the earlier poem. An important insight on Yeats's concern of death lay in the poem "Byzantium" which further exploits the contrast of the physical and spiritual form and the final stanza concludes by differentiating the two. Yeats displays his desire for spiritual wisdom in this poem as he creates a path on earth to the spiritual world; he does this through the image of the dolphin's constant trip between the physical and spiritual worlds. This poem not only shows the poet's change of belief but also provides him with the comfort he desired while aging as he concludes with the vivid image of the spiritual world being connected with the sea of life.

== "A Dialogue of Self and Soul" ==
The indecisive questions posed in "Sailing to Byzantium" are answered in "A Dialogue of Self and Soul" where Yeats chose reincarnation rather than resting in eternity. Yeats reflects upon the paradoxical reality of life whereby he uses two figures, "Self" and "Soul" to represent his opposed attitudes towards life and death. "A Dialogue" opens with "Soul" climbing up the "winding ancient stair" which portrays the progression through life and the descent to non-existence. Yeats's view of heaven and religion is quite different at this point as he became more intrigued by Buddhist thought which can be seen throughout this poem in particular. Very different to his previous interpretation in The Tower, he now portrays the kind of afterlife he sought in "Sailing to Byzantium" as a dark and "breathless" eternity. Self is given the final word, which includes an affirmation of temporal life, a preparedness to "live it all again".

== Contents ==
Works within the book include:

- In Memory of Eva Gore-Booth and Con Markiewicz
- Death
- A Dialogue of Self and Soul
- Blood and the Moon
- Oil and Blood
- Veronica's Napkin
- Symbols
- Spilt Milk
- The Nineteenth Century and After
- Statistics
- Three Movements
- The Seven Sages
- The Crazed Moon
- Coole Park, 1929
- Coole Park and Ballylee, 1931
- For Anne Gregory
- Swift's Epitaph
- At Algeciras—a Meditation upon Death
- The Choice
- Mohini Chatterjee
- Byzantium
- The Mother of God
- Vacillation
- Quarrel in Old Age
- The Results of Thought
- Gratitude to the Unknown Instructors
- Remorse for Intemperate Speech
- Stream and Sun at Glendalough

== See also ==
- 1933 in poetry
- List of works by William Butler Yeats
