= Swift's Epitaph =

Poem by W. B. Yeats about Jonathan Swift

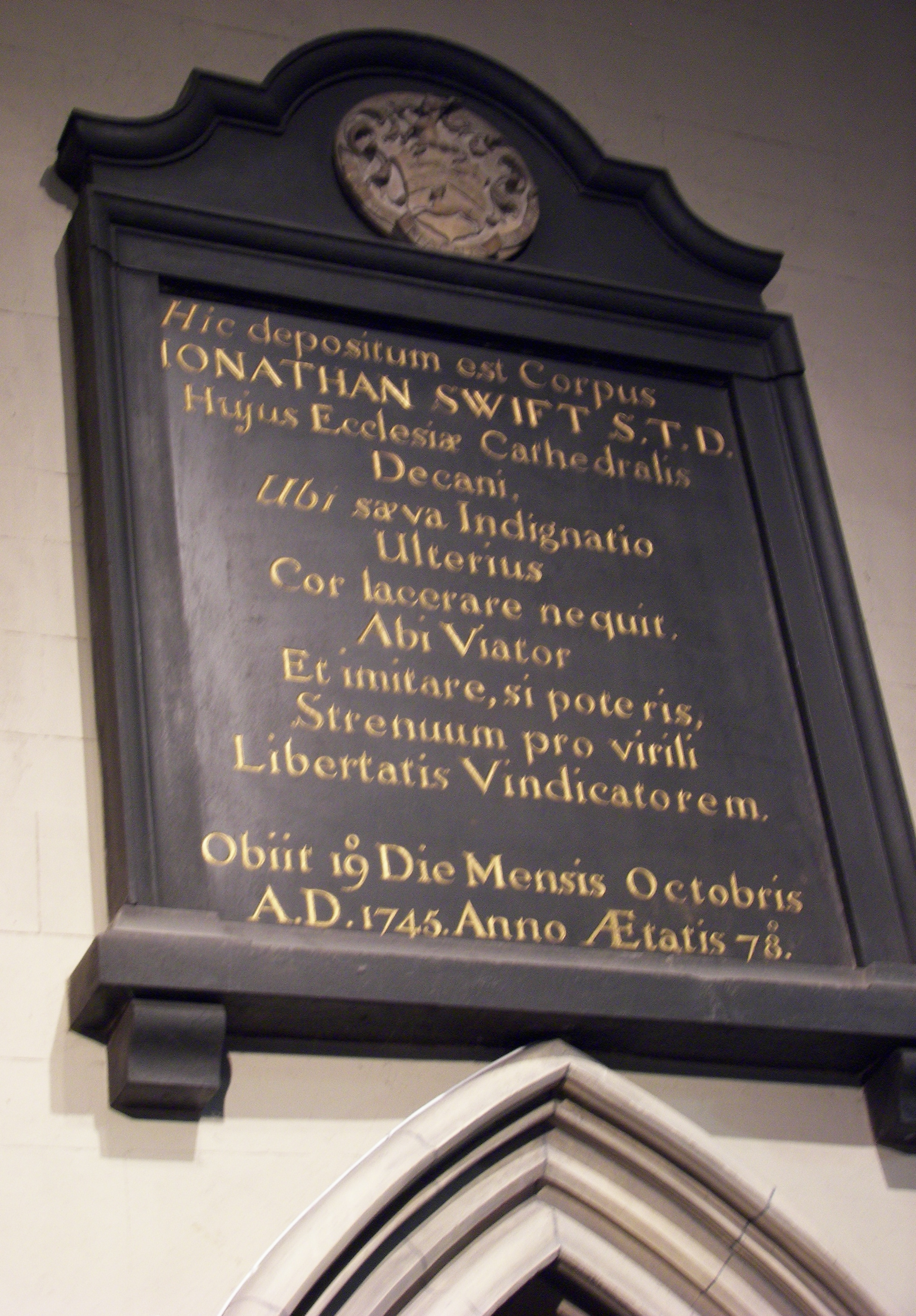
Epitaph marking the burial spot of Jonathan Swift in St. Patrick's Cathedral, Dublin.

Swift's Epitaph is a translation by Irish poet William Butler Yeats of Jonathan Swift's epitaph, which Swift wrote for himself in Latin. Yeats' somewhat free translation appeared in his 1933 collection The Winding Stair and Other Poems.

The epitaph itself is controversial, having been called both "scarce intelligible" and "the greatest epitaph in history".

== Swift's Epitaph ==
Swift has sailed into his rest;
Savage indignation there
Cannot lacerate his Breast.
Imitate him if you dare,
World-Besotted Traveller; he
Served human liberty.

=== Original Latin version ===
Hic depositum est Corpus
IONATHAN SWIFT S.T.D.
Hujus Ecclesiæ Cathedralis
Decani,
Ubi sæva Indignatio
Ulterius
Cor lacerare nequit,
Abi Viator
Et imitare, si poteris,
Strenuum pro virili
Libertatis Vindicatorem.

Obiit 19º Die Mensis Octobris
A.D. 1745 Anno Ætatis 78º.

=== Literal Translation ===
Here is laid the Body
of Jonathan Swift, Doctor of Sacred Theology,
Dean of this Cathedral Church,

where fierce Indignation
can no longer
injure the Heart.
Go forth, Voyager,
and copy, if you can,
this vigorous (to the best of his ability)
Champion of Liberty.

He died on the 19th Day of the Month of October,
A.D. 1745, in the 78th Year of his Age.
