= The Circus Animals' Desertion =

Poem by William Butler Yeats

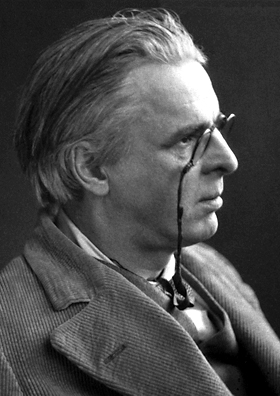
Photograph of William Butler Yeats taken in 1923

"The Circus Animals' Desertion" is a poem by William Butler Yeats published in Last Poems in 1939. While the original composition date of the poem is unknown, it was probably written between November 1937 and September 1938. In the preface, Yeats suggests that he intended the poem to combine his personal views and impressions with the customs and beliefs of Christian Ireland. The poem was the last work published in Yeats's final collection, with "Politics" following as an envoi. In the poem, the poet uses the desertion of circus animals as an analogy to describe his failure to find inspiration for poetic creation as he seeks for new inspiration. Critics have detected aspects of both Modernism and Postmodern literature in the poem.

== The poem ==
The poem is an ottava rima consisting of 3 parts, the first and the last with 8 lines each and the second containing 3 stanzas of 8 lines. The poem's opening lines suggest that the poet is searching for a theme, but in the process, he finds the "masterful images" of his earlier works. The reflection upon previous poetic creations appears again as the second part begins and the poet voices his frustration by stating "What can I but enumerate old themes."

The final lines of the poem conclude that the poet must "lie down where all the ladders start," which leads Michael O'Neill to suggest that the use of the word "start" indicates a new beginning taking place as the poem ends. The "foul rag and bone shop of the heart," O'Neill contends, is the paper upon which the poem is written, and he argues that Yeats gives "grandeur" to the gutter items of the poem, as the reimagining of "old kettles, old bottles, a broken can" as well as the "rag and bone shop of the heart," become "as masterful a set of images as any Yeats has created."

== Critical reception ==
Kurt Koenigsberger describes "The Circus Animal's Desertion" as the poet's attempt to "concede life's detritus," as the "beasts," which represent poetic imagination, disappear in his old age. He argues that Yeats uses the analogy of the circus animal to take the place of poetic work and becomes a spectator of his own imagination as he finds himself unable to conjure up a new theme for his poetry. In "Yeats and Postmodernism," Earl Ingersoll describes the poem as being one of the early pieces of Postmodern literature suggesting that "The Circus Animals' Desertion" is a poem about writing poems. He claims that the subject portrays a withdrawal from Modernist literature and the themes of Yeats' earlier works.

Michael O'Neill argues that the poem attempts to fill the gaps between Yeats's emotions and the poetry they had inspired over his lifetime, as he was in his seventies when it was composed. O'Neill suggests that the poet is tired at the time the poem is written and is searching for a "new source of creativity," only in "The Circus Animals' Desertion," that inspiration comes from a critical analysis of his previous works.

In Our Secret Discipline: Yeats and Lyric Form, critic Helen Vendler suggests that the poem is a recognition of Yeats changing from one position in society to another as he moves from the prominent poet who plays the role of the ringmaster in a circus to an elderly man with writer's block who must recycle the themes of his past works. Vendler analyzes the references of The Countess Cathleen and Oisin throughout the poem and puts particular emphasis on the narrator's critique of his previous works, arguing that the tone of the poem is highly retrospective.
