= Coole Park =

Nature reserve in Ireland, former estate of Gregory family

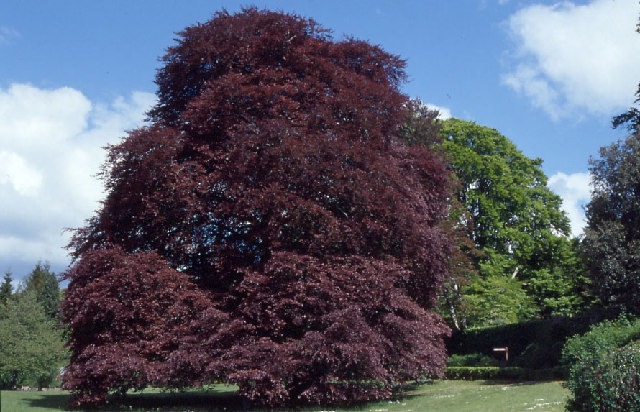
- Autograph Tree in the Walled Garden

- Location within Ireland
- Type: National
- Location: near Gort, County Galway
- Coordinates: 53°05′47″N 8°50′06″W
- Area: 1,000 acres (404.69 ha)
- Created: late 18th century
- Founder: Robert Gregory
- Operator: National Parks and Wildlife Service (Ireland)
- Status: Open all year
- Website: www.coolepark.ie

Ramsar Wetland
- Official name: Coole Lough & Garryland Wood
- Designated: 30 May 1990
- Reference no.: 473

Coole Park is a nature reserve of approximately 1,000 acres (4 km^{2}) located a few miles west of Gort, County Galway, Ireland. It is managed by the Irish National Parks & Wildlife Service, part of the Department of Arts, Heritage and the Gaeltacht. The park is in a low–lying karstic limestone area characterised by seasonal lakes, known as turloughs, which are almost unique to Ireland. It has extensive woodlands. There are 6 kilometres of signposted nature trails plus a formal late 18th century walled garden.

== History ==
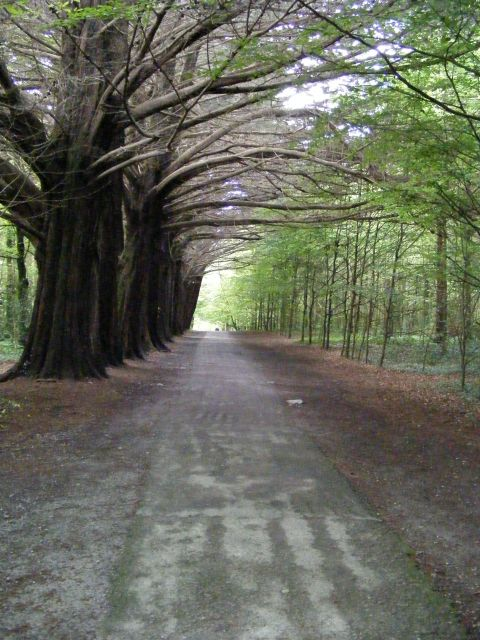
Woodland path at Coole Park

The park was formerly the estate of the Gregory family. Coole House was built in the late 18th century for Robert Gregory: a three-storey house with a square porch and as principal rooms a dining room and drawing-room with bay windows facing out to Coole Lough and the Burren Hills, and a library in between them.

In 1880, Robert's great-grandson, William Henry Gregory married Isabella Augusta Persse, who became Lady Gregory. The death in World War I of their only child, Robert, a pilot in the Royal Flying Corps, inspired the poet W B Yeats to write works which included "An Irish Airman Foresees His Death."

The walled garden contains an autograph tree, a mature copper beech that is engraved with initials of many of the leading figures of the Irish Literary Revival who were personal friends of Lady Gregory including Yeats, Edward Martyn, George Bernard Shaw, John Millington Synge, Mario Manlio Rossi and Seán O'Casey. Yeats' poem The Wild Swans at Coole was inspired by the beauty of the swans in the turlough at Coole Park. Yeats's home at Thoor Ballylee was just 3 miles away; he also wrote "Coole Park, 1929", a poem that describes the park as a symbol for the revival of Irish literature:

"Here traveller, scholar, poet, take your stand, / When all these rooms and passages are gone / When nettles wave upon a shapeless mound / And saplings root among the broken stone."

Coole House was sold by Margaret Gregory, the widowed wife of Robert Gregory, to the Irish state in 1927, with life tenancy for her mother-in-law. Lady Gregory died in 1932 and the furnishings were soon auctioned off. According to the National Archives, the building fell into a ruin, a neglect deplored by Micheál Mac Liammóir in 1964, and was demolished by the state in 1941. Today, all that remains is the plinth on which it stood.

== Today ==
The grounds are open to the public all year round (free admission). A visitor centre located in the former outbuildings (late 18th century) operates during high season (April to September inclusive). The centre offers tea rooms, an audio/visual presentation on Lady Gregory and the literary history of Coole Park, and also a multi-media exhibition called "Coole Park through the eyes of 'Me and Nu', Granddaughters of Lady Gregory".

In 2014, fungal disease forced the felling of many trees in Coole Park for safety reasons, as confirmed by the National Parks and Wildlife Service (Ireland).

== Ecology ==
The ephemeral nature of turlough hydrology gives rise to a characteristic ecology. Turloughs have been designated as a Priority Habitat in the EU Habitats Directive. Coole Park is part of the Coole-Garryland Complex, a candidate Special Area of Conservation (site code SAC 252).

Since 1990 Coole Lough & Garryland Wood has been protected as a Wetland of International Importance under the Ramsar Convention.

=== Protection for birds ===
A wildfowl sanctuary, where the shooting of game birds is not permitted, is designated under the Wildlife Act 1976. The park is included in a Special Protection Area for birds under the EU Birds Directive: this site of 520 ha (site code SPA 107) was designated in 1996 because of its importance for wintering waterfowl, notably whooper swan. The SPA overlaps with a smaller Important Bird Area, Coole Park and Garryland complex.
