= Erik Lindberg =

Swedish sculptor and engraver (1873–1966)

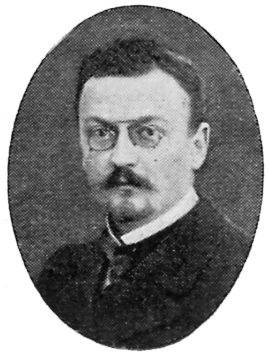
Erik Lindberg

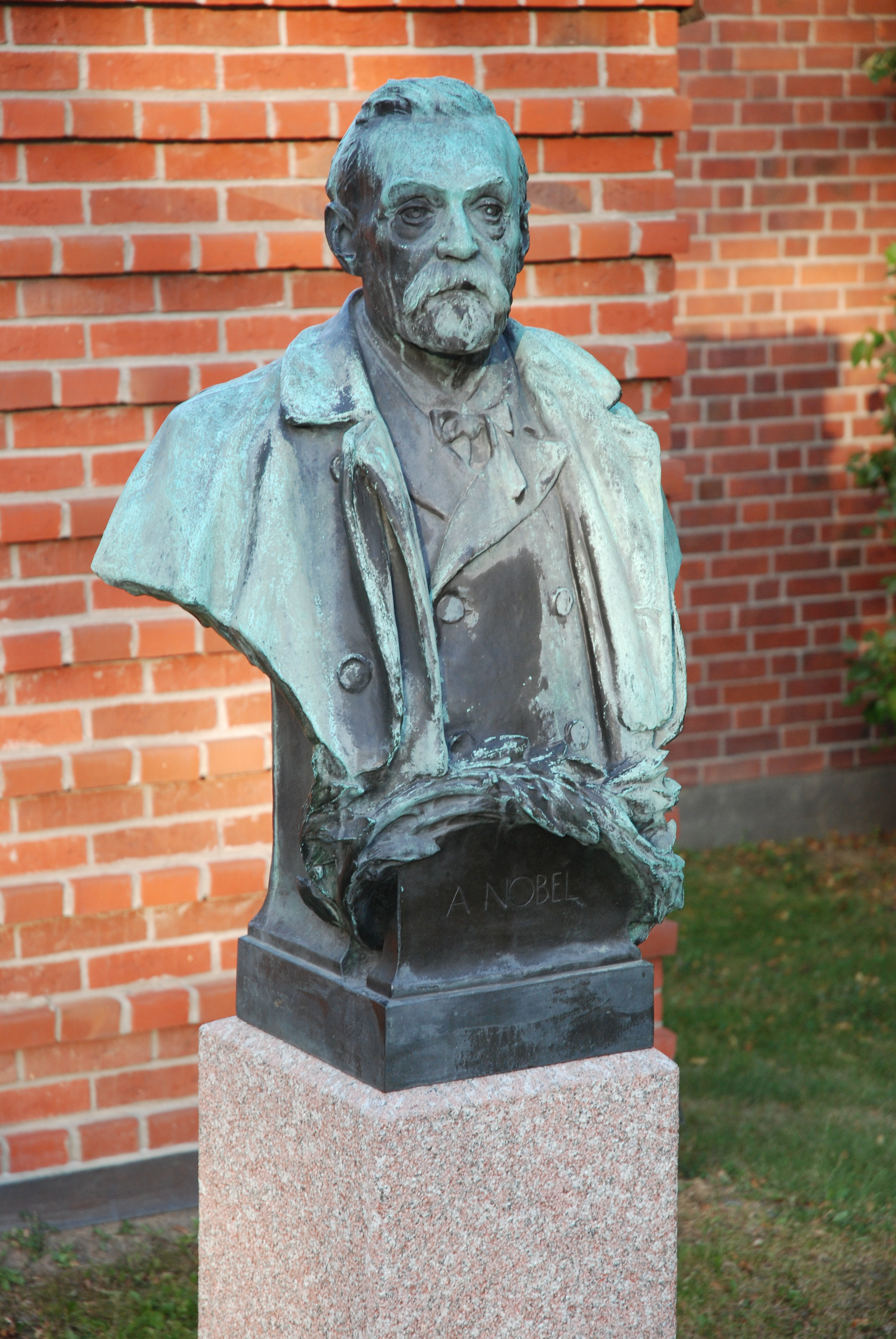
Bust of Alfred Nobel by Erik Lindberg outside Karolinska Institutet in Stockholm

Johan Erik Lindberg (31 December 1873 – 28 September 1966) was a Swedish sculptor and engraver. He was best known for designing the Nobel Prize medals.

== Biography ==
Erik Lindberg was born in Stockholm, Sweden. He was the son of Adolph Lindberg (1839–1916) and his wife Hildegard Charlotta Grundström (1843–1923). His father was a noted sculptor and professor at the Royal Swedish Academy of Fine Arts (Kungliga Akademien för de fria konsterna) in Stockholm.

He trained at his father's studio from 1892 to 1899. He also attended the Royal Swedish Academy from 1893 until 1897 when he graduated. He obtained a scholarship which enabled him to spend some years in Paris from around 1901 to 1902. He also conducted a study trip to Italy in 1901. He was influenced by modern French medal engravers of that period including Louis-Oscar Roty (1846–1911), Jules-Clément Chaplain (1839–1909), Ernest Paulin Tasset (1839–1921) and Frédéric-Charles-Victor de Vernon (1858–1912).

In 1901 Lindberg was given the task of creating the medal for the Nobel Prizes in the fields of Physics, Chemistry, Physiology or Medicine and Literature. The medal for the Nobel Peace Prize was created by Norwegian sculptor Gustav Vigeland (1869–1943). According to correspondence between Lindberg and his father, the designs were not quite ready for the first ceremony in 1901; the reverse sides of the medals required approval from the Prize-Giving association, and so the winners were given temporary medals. In November 1901, after lengthy discussions by letter, Lindberg returned to Stockholm to present his ideas in person. However, it wasn't until September the following year the designs were ready and the first winners received their proper prize.

In 1912, he designed medals for the 1912 Summer Olympics in Stockholm. In 1915 he received a gold medal at the Panama-Pacific International Exhibition. He was engaged as an engraver at the Royal Mint (Kungliga Myntet) from 1916 until he retired in 1944. He was a professor at the Royal Swedish Academy from 1930. Many of his works are on display in the collection of the Nationalmuseum in Stockholm.

== Personal life ==
In 1902, he married Johanna Dagmar Maria Treffenberg (1875–1960). They were the parents of Folke Adolf Lindberg (1903–1988) and Sven Erik Lindberg (1905-1996). Johan Erik Lindberg died in Stockholm in 1966.

== Other Sources ==
- "The Nobel Prize Medals and the Medal for the Prize in Economics". Archived from the original on 2007-10-27.
- "Erik Lindberg". Archived from the original on 2007-10-23.
