= Remorse for Intemperate Speech =

"Remorse for Intemperate Speech" is a poem written by Irish poet William Butler Yeats. It appeared in his 1933 volume of poems The Winding Stair and Other Poems.

Yeats wrote this poem on 28 August 1931. It is one of several poems in The Winding Stair to deal with remorse, both personal and, as in this case, in the context of Irish history.

The poem consists of three stanzas with an AABAB rhyme scheme. Each stanza ends with the refrain "A fanatic heart". In his footnote to the poem, Yeats says that he pronounces "fanatic" in "the older and more Irish way, so that the last line of each stanza contains but two beats".

The poem's speaker first addresses his own past intemperate speech, saying that "Nothing said or done can reach" his heart. He then turns to the anger and hatred that the Irish have inherited and cannot let go of: "Out of Ireland have we come. / Great hatred, little room, / Maimed us at the start."

== In popular culture ==
The poem's repeated refrain, "A fanatic heart", is used as the title for a 1984 short story collection by Edna O'Brien.

Noel Gallagher read this poem as part of Bob Geldof's film on Yeats, A Fanatic Heart: Bob Geldof on W.B. Yeats.
