= The Book of the Homeless =

Collection of essays, art, poetry and musical scores

The Book of the Homeless is a 1916 collection of essays, art, poetry, and musical scores. Proceeds of its sales were used to fund civilians displaced by World War I. It was edited by Edith Wharton.

== Contents ==
- A letter from Joseph Joffre
- An introduction from Theodore Roosevelt
- A preface by Edith Wharton

== Other works ==
- "The Brothers" by Maurice Barrès
- "A Promise" by Sarah Bernhardt
- "The Orphans of Flanders" by Laurence Binyon
- "One Year Later" by Paul Bourget
- "The Dance" by Rupert Brooke
- "The Precious Blood" by Paul Claudel
- "by How the Young Men died in Hellas" Jean Cocteau
- "Poland Revisited" by Joseph Conrad
- "La légende de Saint Christophe" by Vincent d'Indy
- "The Right to Liberty" by Eleonora Duse
- "Harvest" by John Galsworthy
- "The Arrogance and Servility of Germany" by Edmund Gosse
- "A Message" by Robert Grant
- "Cry of the Homeless" by Thomas Hardy
- "Science and Conscience" by Paul Hervieu
- "The Little Children" by William Dean Howells
- "An Heroic Stand" by Georges Louis Humbert
- "The Long Wards" by Henry James
- "An Epitaph" by Francis Jammes
- "Our Inheritance" by Maurice Maeterlinck
- "We Who Sit Afar Off" by Edward Sandford Martin
- "In Sleep" by Alice Meynell
- "A Moment of Tragic Purgation" by Paul Elmer More
- "Our Dead" by Anna de Noailles
- "Two Songs of a Year: 1914-1915" by Josephine Preston Peabody
- "Rain in Belgium" by Lilla Cabot Perry
- "The Russian Bogyman" by Agnes Repplier
- "The Exile" by Henri de Régnier
- "Horror and Beauty" by Edmond Rostand
- "The Undergraduate Killed in Battle" by George Santayana
- "Souvenir d'une marche boche" by Igor Stravinsky
- "Song of the Welsh Women" by André Suarès
- "The Children and the Flag" by Edith M. Thomas
- "The Troubler of Telaro" by Herbert Trench
- "The New Spring" by Émile Verhaeren
- "Wordsworth's Valley in War-time" by Mary Augusta Ward
- "1915" by Barrett Wendell
- "The Tryst" by Edith Wharton
- "Finisterre" by Margaret L. Woods
- "A Reason for Keeping Silent" by W. B. Yeats
