= Politics (poem) =

1938 poem by William Butler Yeats

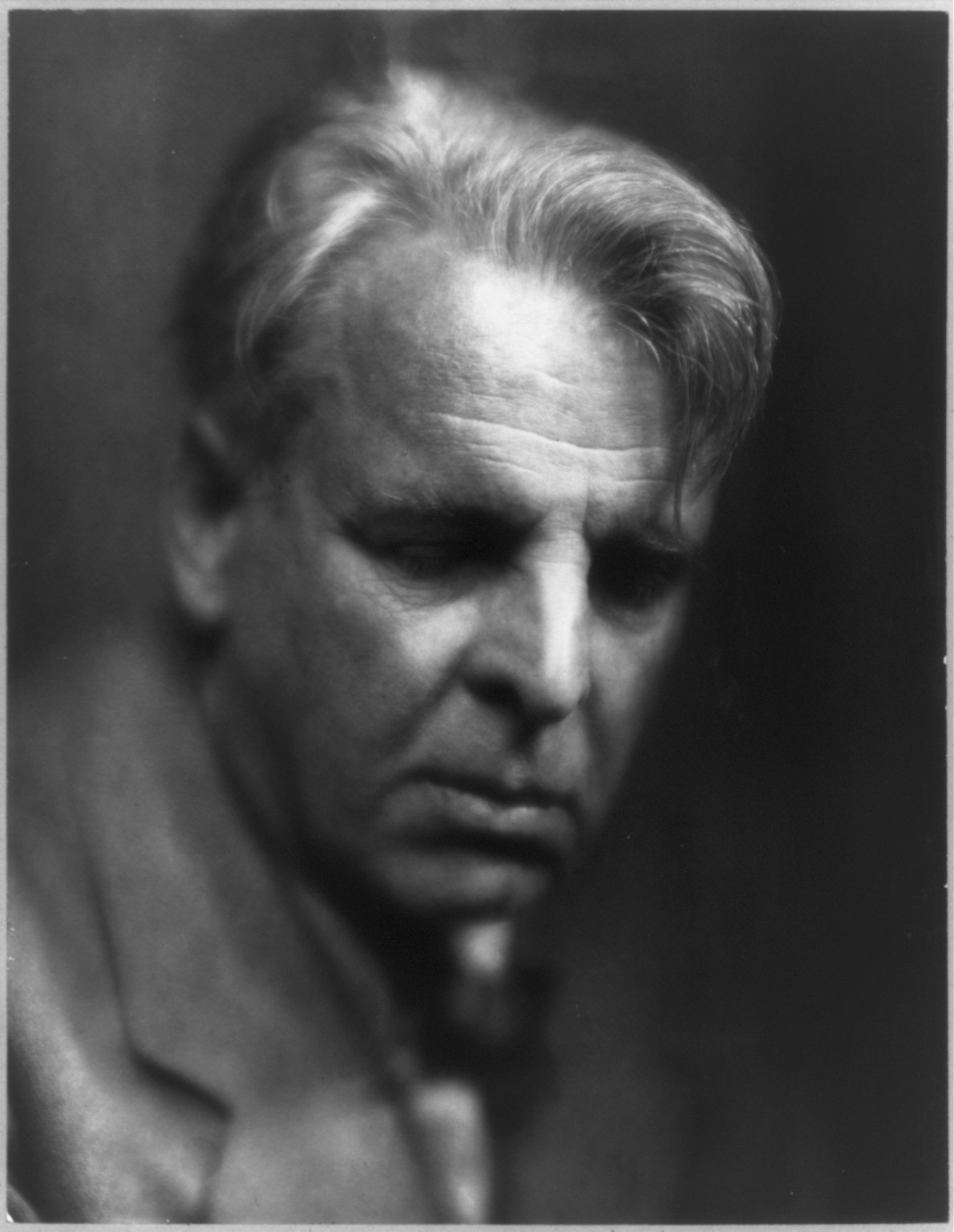
Photograph of William Butler Yeats taken February 7, 1933.

"Politics" is a poem by Irish poet William Butler Yeats written on May 24, 1938. It was composed during the time of the Spanish Civil War as well as during the pre-war period of Adolf Hitler's Third Reich in Germany. The poem hints at the political situations of "Rome" (Italy), "Russia" (the Soviet Union), and Spain, but ultimately discusses topics more relevant to private human interaction rather than public, or political situations. The poem never mentions Germany or Hitler, despite the fact that the "war and war's alarms" surrounding the poem's creation arose from fears of Germany's aggression rather than Italy's, Russia's, or Spain's. Many versions of the text exist: the original typescript of May 1938, the first typescript with hand-written corrections dated August 12, 1938, as well as a final "Coole Edition" of the poem dated June 29, 1939, which was not published until it was included in Last Poems in 1939. Yeats intended for the poem to be printed last in the collection, as an envoi to "The Circus Animals' Desertion", and while a debate as to the true order of the poems has continued since 1939, "Politics" was the last lyric poem Yeats wrote and remains the final work printed in all posthumous editions.

== Background ==
The epigraph at the top of the poem is taken from Thomas Mann, "In our time the destiny of man presents its meanings in political terms". The phrase had been quoted in a copy of the Yale Review and Yeats wrote notes on that edition and attached them to the first typescript draft of the "Politics". The last two lines of the poem, "But oh that I were young again/ And held her in my arms", is likely taken from a quatrain cited by American writer Archibald MacLeish in a 1938 article in the Yale Review intended to exemplify the use of "living tongue" by the anonymous author of the 16th Century song "The Western Wynde":

O Western wind when wilt thou blow
That small rain down can rain:--
Christ, that my love were in my arms
And I in my bed again

MacLeish, in the article, compliments Yeats for his "public" language, but the poem's response to that compliment appears, to Yeats historian Brenda Maddox, to be tempered by Yeats' refusal to believe that war would actually break out. In May 1938, British forces in London were recruiting air raid wardens in preparation for possible war with Germany, and Yeats wrote in a letter that he was not expecting that war should break out, but in the letter he suggested that if war were to arise in Europe, he might move to Cornwall to escape the violence .

== Themes ==
In the poem, there are many opposites that appear to challenge each other: age and youth, intellect and emotion, and male and female. The implication that the young are in each other's arms, to Nicholas Meihuizen, highlights the poet's age and its adverse relationship to the youth of the poem's lovers. As the poet speaks of turning his inability to turn his "attention" from "that girl standing there" to "politics", the poet presents the battle of intellect and emotion, a battle which emotion wins in the poem. Likewise, Meihuizen argues that the poem presents sexual longing in the final line as the poem ends with the combination of the male and female in sexual union.

The conflict between the girl and the political surroundings mentioned in the text is, according to critic Charles Ferrall, an extension of a correspondence Yeats had with Olivia Shakespear in which Yeats suggests that there is a relationship between Fascism and aesthetics. While Yeats never embraced Fascism the way that Ezra Pound did, the theme of the relationship between art and politics appears to focus heavily on that particular form of government as it was the prevailing political force in two of the three countries mentioned in the poem. However, Yeats was consistently elusive on political matters throughout his literary career and carefully avoids taking a position in "Politics". Michael Bell, in his essay "W. B. Yeats:'In Dreams Begin Responsibilities,'" suggests that in "Politics", Yeats "treads a dubious line between honesty to mood and a would-be seductive fecklessness". The image of young people in each other's arms calls back to Yeats's 1928 poem "Sailing to Byzantium" ("That is no country for old men. The young / In one another's arms, birds in the trees").

The retreat from the political world suggested by the poem's title and carried out throughout the text of the poem also implies that the poet is inclined to create what Glenn Willmott calls a "narcissistic paradise". According to Willmott, Yeats's poems often move from the world of social interaction to a place where the individual finds seclusion, as is also the case in the pastoral Yeats's earlier poems "The Lake Isle of Innisfree, "The Song of the Happy Shepherd", and "The Sad Shepherd". All of the poems create a "utopia" in which the poet finds relief from public life by withdrawing from social spheres and entering into a mythical setting, yet "Politics" is unique in that it lacks the pastoral qualities of the earlier works and finds solitude in a different time rather than a different place.

== Critical response ==
To Lewis MacAdams, the presentation of "Politics" was Yeats's attempt to counter Mann's argument that meaning are presented in political terms. MacAdams argues that "Politics" suggests that the pull of "nostalgia and love" appears to Yeats to be stronger than the call of "war and war's alarms" presented in line 10. In La poétique de W. B. Yeats, Jacqueline Genet suggests that the opposing forces in the poem are the public life and the private life, which she equates to a battle between the self and the anti-self. To Genet, contradictions are at the center of "Yeatsian politics", and she suggests that "Politics" represents the poet's inner struggle to remain disengaged from the world around him and remain focused on the private life. For Yeats, Genet suggests that the struggle to remain objective is cyclical, citing "Easter, 1916" as an example of Yeats allowing political forces to dictate poetical, or personal reflection.

Phillip L. Marcus, in Yeats and Aesthetic Power argues that "Politics" clearly represents a different view on art that many of Yeats's earlier works in that the politics are no longer limited to Ireland and the United Kingdom but have grown to encompass all of Europe. Marcus argues that Yeats's paradigms resembled less of Thoor Balylee and London, as they did in his earlier poems, and more of a broader scope that included other countries. While Yeats had sought a larger audience for his poetry and achieves success beyond Ireland, he fails to create a political voice to speak to the new audience and sinks back into the seclusion of personal interest. Marcus suggests that Yeats, while attracted to the idea of Fascism because of its "respect for both sides of social and political dichotomies", chooses instead to honor a "cultural nationalism" that is independent of politics.
