= Roderick Gill =

Irish cricketer (1919–1983)

Cricket information
- Batting: Right-handed
- Bowling: Right-arm medium

International information
- National side: Ireland

Career statistics
Competition	First-class
Matches	3
Runs scored	72
Batting average	14.40
100s/50s	0/0
Top score	37
Balls bowled	348
Wickets	3
Bowling average	42.66
5 wickets in innings	0
10 wickets in match	0
Best bowling	2/19
Catches/stumpings	2/–
- Source: CricketArchive, 15 November 2022

Roderick Ian "Derry" Gill (21 July 1919 – 28 October 1983) was an Irish cricketer. A right-handed batsman and right-arm medium pace bowler, he played seven times for the Ireland cricket team between 1947 and 1951, including three first-class matches.

== Playing career ==
Gill made his debut for Ireland in May 1947, playing against Scotland in a first-class match. He played a match against the Craven Gentlemen the following month, before spending two years outside the Ireland team, his next game coming in August 1949 against the MCC at Lord's

He played three times for Ireland in 1950, against Scotland, Nottinghamshire and the MCC. Against Scotland, he scored 37 in the Ireland first innings, his highest score for Ireland. Against the MCC, in his final first-class match, he took 2/19 in the MCC first innings, his best bowling figures for Ireland. These are also his best first-class performances. The following year, he played his last match for Ireland, against the MCC at Lord's.

== Statistics ==
In all matches for Ireland, he scored 127 runs at an average of 11.55, and took four wickets at an average of 47.25.
