= Edwin Ellis (poet) =

British poet and illustrator

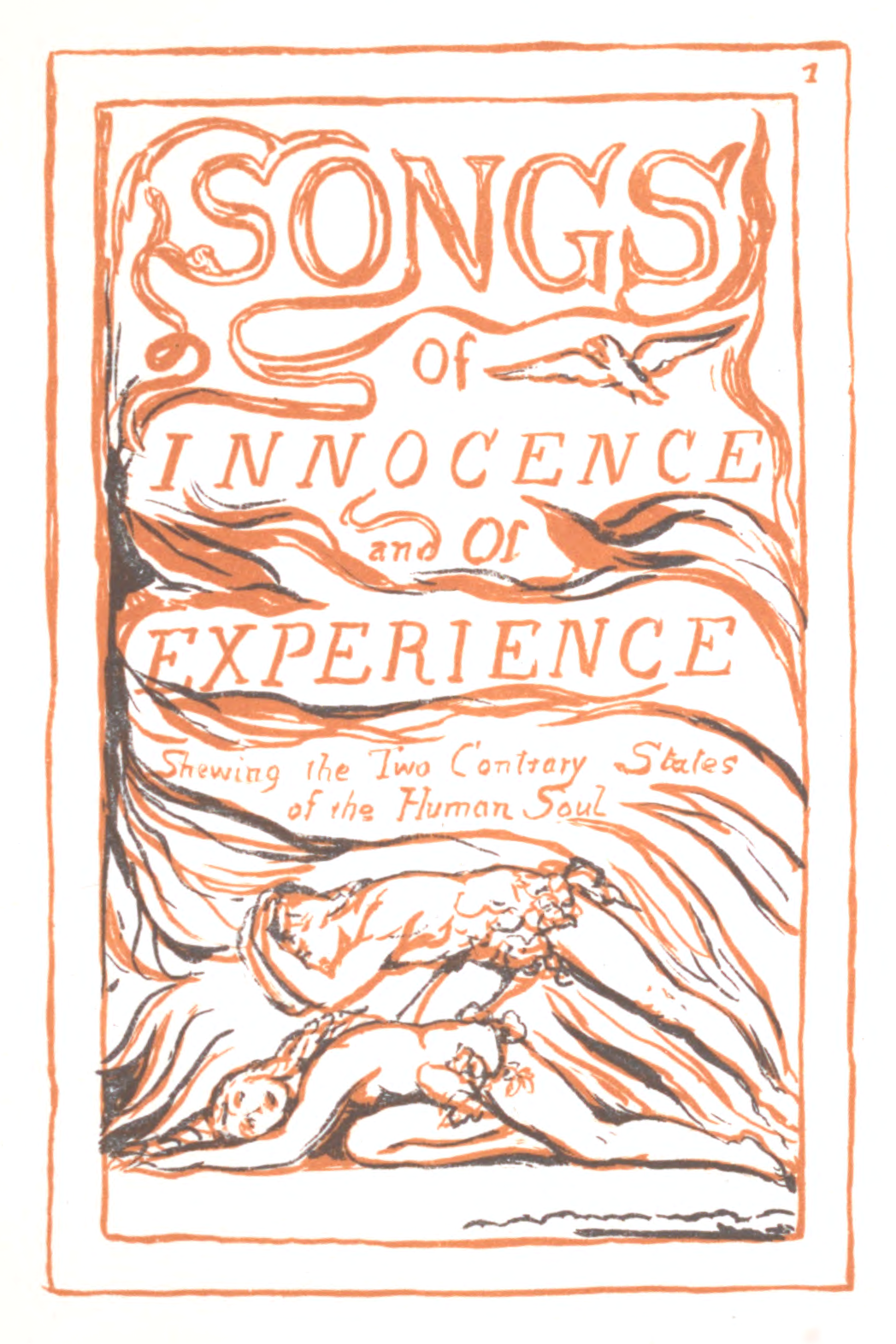
Blake facsimile (1893) by Edwin John Ellis

Edwin John Ellis (1848–1916) was a British poet and illustrator. He is now remembered mostly for the three-volume collection of the works of William Blake he edited with W. B. Yeats. It is now criticised, however, for weak scholarship, and preconceptions.

== Life ==
Ellis was a son of Alexander John Ellis. He was a long-term friend of John Butler Yeats, sharing an interest in aesthetics, and from 1869 a London studio in Newman Street; but was not on good terms with Susan his wife.

Ellis was in an association with John Trivett Nettleship, and Sydney Hall, also followers of Blake, as well as John Butler Yeats and George Wilson (1848–1890, a Scottish Pre-Raphaelite inspired artist). Called The Brotherhood, the group was set up in 1869, with Hall leaving early.

When the Yeats family moved to Bedford Park in London, which occurred in 1879, Ellis met the son William Butler Yeats. W. B. Yeats became close to the "vague and depressive" Ellis in 1888. Their joint study of Blake began in 1889, and resulted in a major textual discovery, the manuscript of Vala, or the Four Zoas.

Ellis took part in the gatherings of the Rhymers' Club, and contributed to their anthologies. R. F. Foster describes his relationship to W. B. Yeats as that of a collaborator, repaid as other rhymers or mentors were by inclusion in Yeats's Oxford Book of Modern Verse 1892–1935.

== Works ==
- Fate in Arcadia, and other poems 1892
- Facsimile of the original outlines before colouring of the Songs of Innocence and of Experience executed by William Blake 1893
- The works of William Blake, poetic, symbolic and critical 1893 (with W B Yeats)
- Seen in Three Days, 1893
- The Real Blake; a portrait biography, 1907
- Sancan the Bard

== Family ==
Ellis was married, with a German wife who died around 1922.
