= Robert Gregory (RFC officer) =

Irish cricketer

William Robert Gregory
Personal information
- Born: 21 May 1881; London, England
- Died: 23 January 1918 (aged 36); Monastiero, Padua, Italy
- Batting: Right-handed
- Bowling: Leg-break and googly
- Relatives: William Henry Gregory (father); Augusta, Lady Gregory (mother)

Domestic team information
- Years: Team
- 1912: Ireland
- Only FC: 30 August 1912 Ireland v Scotland

Career statistics
Competition	First-class
Matches	1
Runs scored	–
Batting average	–
100s/50s	–
Top score	–
Balls bowled	162
Wickets	9
Bowling average	10.22
5 wickets in innings	1
10 wickets in match	0
Best bowling	8/80
Catches/stumpings	0/–
- Source: CricketArchive, 24 November 2015

William Robert Gregory MC (20 May 1881 – 23 January 1918) was an Irish flying ace who served as a fighter pilot with the Royal Flying Corps during World War I. He was also an accomplished artist and cricket player. His death was memorialised in a series of poems by W. B. Yeats.

== Early life and family ==
The only child of William Henry Gregory and Lady Gregory, an associate of W. B. Yeats, Robert was born in County Galway in Ireland in May 1881. He grew up in the couple's houses in Ireland and England (Coole Park and London). He studied at Harrow, Oxford University and the Slade School of Art. In 1907, he married Lily Margaret Parry, and they had three children.

== Sport ==
He excelled at bowls, boxing, horse riding and cricket. He was good enough at cricket to play once for the Ireland cricket team, taking 8/80 with his leg spin bowling in a first-class match against Scotland in 1912. He didn't score a run. His bowling performance in that match remains the tenth best in all matches for Ireland and the fourth best in first-class cricket for Ireland. His bowling average of 10.22 is the second best for Ireland in first-class cricket.

== Art ==
An accomplished artist, he studied in London at the Slade School of Fine Art, eventually marrying another Slade student, Margaret Parry; his best-man was Augustus John, who had assisted him in developing his style. He worked in Paris at the design studio of Jacques Émile Blanche, and had his own exhibition of paintings in Chelsea in 1914. He was also an illustrator for books and stage.

== World War I ==
In 1915 Gregory joined the war effort, although he was now 34, and had three children. He briefly became a member of the 4th Connaught Rangers, but quickly transferred in 1916 to the Royal Flying Corps. A fighter pilot, he eventually was credited with eight victories. His colleagues Mick Mannock and George McElroy, with many more victories, became much better known, but he was the first of the Irish pilots to achieve ace status in 40 Squadron RFC. France made him a Chevalier of the Legion d'Honneur in 1917, and he was awarded a Military Cross for "conspicuous gallantry and devotion to duty."

He flew the Royal Aircraft Factory R.E.8, the French Nieuport 17, and, at the time of his death, the Sopwith Camel.

== Death and legacy ==
He was killed in Italy at the age of 36. It has been commonly stated that he was the victim of "friendly fire", when an Italian pilot mistakenly shot him down; but other sources say it was a flying accident. In 2017, Geoffrey O'Byrne White, a director of the Irish Aviation Authority, great-grandnephew of Lady Gregory, and former pilot in the Irish Air Corps, said he believed Major Gregory had become incapacitated at high altitude, attributing this to an inoculation for influenza.

Robert's death had a lasting effect on W. B. Yeats, and he became the subject of four poems by him, although Lady Gregory is reported not to have agreed with all of their content. They are: "In Memory of Major Robert Gregory", "An Irish Airman Foresees His Death", "Shepherd and Goatherd", and "Reprisals".
