= Jimmy Rudd =

Irish footballer

Personal information
- Full name: John James Rudd
- Date of birth: 25 October 1919
- Place of birth: Dublin, Ireland
- Date of death: 8 December 1985 (aged 66)
- Position: Winger

Senior career*
Years	Team	Apps	(Gls)
- Terenure Athletic
1938–1947	Manchester City	2	(0)
1947–1949	York City	83	(23)
1949	Leeds United	18	(1)
1949–1951	Rotherham United	75	(11)
1951–1952	Scunthorpe United	32	(4)
1952	Workington	17	(1)
- * Club domestic league appearances and goals

John James Rudd (25 October 1919 – 8 December 1985) was an Irish footballer.
