= The Works of William Blake =

1893 book by Edwin Ellis

The Works of William Blake: Poetic, Symbolic, and Critical
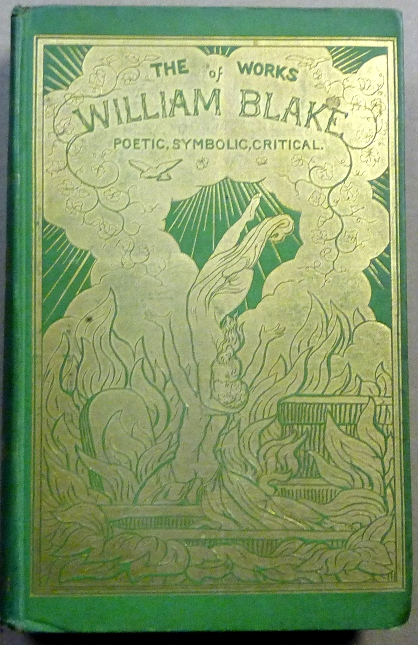
- Author: Edwin John Ellis, William Butler Yeats
- Language: English
- Genre: Biography, Literary criticism
- Published: Bernard Quaritch
- Publication date: 27 January 1893
- Publication place: England

The Works of William Blake: Poetic, Symbolic and Critical, edited with lithographs of the illustrated prophetic books, and a memoir and interpretation by Edwin John Ellis and William Butler Yeats, is a three-volume commentary book about the English poet, painter and printmaker William Blake.

Written through a dual collaboration between the poets Edwin John Ellis and William Butler Yeats and published by Bernard Quaritch in 1893, this work was the first comprehensive attempt to interpret Blake's œuvre, by placing its importance on his "prophetic books", in contrast to the approach of predecessors such as Algernon Charles Swinburne and William Michael Rossetti. Also, the work was the first collected edition of the majority of Blake's poetry with an erudite commentary, despite its erroneous and misleading traits, like the memoir. As one of the significant nineteenth-century developments in the dissemination of Blake's poetry, this book also made an ambitious attempt to interpret the poet's vatic approach to the making of literature. Today, this classic of 1893 is still illuminating for the lifetime influence it had on one of its editors, W. B. Yeats, who became perhaps the twentieth century's greatest poet in English and, like Blake, a visionary one, at that.

From 1889 to 1893 Yeats worked with Edwin Ellis, a minor painter and poet, on a three-volume edition of Blake's works, with a memoir and an effort to define every aspect of Blake's symbols. Yeats was pleased that Blake's artistic and poetic ideas harmonized with those of the theosophists and the students and members of the Hermetic Order of the Golden Dawn, for now he could use occult materials and claim the authority of a great poet for such beliefs and inspirations in his own poetry.

This set contains the first reproduced illustrations of Blake's Prophetic Books and is the first collection to publish Blake's Vala, or The Four Zoas. Yeats marked down William Blake as a master early on, and with Edwin Ellis produced a large-scale commentary on Blake's prophetic writings in 1893. While often erratic and idiosyncratic, it helped establish the importance of Blake's esoteric verse.
