= Pentameter =

Poetic metre of five feet

Pentameter (Ancient Greek: πεντάμετρος, 'measuring five (feet)') is a term describing the meter of a poem. A poem is said to be written in a particular pentameter when the lines of the poem have the length of five metrical feet. A metrical foot is, in classical poetry, a combination of two or more short or long syllables in a specific order; although this "does not provide an entirely reliable standard of measurement" in heavily accented Germanic languages such as English. In these languages it is defined as a combination of one stressed and one or two unstressed syllables in a specific order.

In English verse, pentameter has been the most common meter used ever since the 1500s; early examples include some of Geoffrey Chaucer's work in the 1300s. The most common foot is the iamb, resulting in iambic pentameter. Most English sonnets are written in iambic pentameter. It is also the meter used by Shakespeare in his blank-verse tragedies.
