= The Bounty of Sweden =

1925 book by W. B. Yeats

The Bounty of Sweden: A Meditation, and a Lecture Delivered before the Royal Swedish Academy and Certain Notes
- Author: W. B. Yeats
- Publisher: Cuala Press
- Publication date: 1925

The Bounty of Sweden: A Meditation, and a Lecture Delivered before the Royal Swedish Academy and Certain Notes is a 1925 book by the Irish poet W. B. Yeats. It was published by the Cuala Press.

The Bounty of Sweden documents Yeats's journey to the Swedish capital Stockholm to receive the Nobel Prize in Literature in 1923, and it includes the lecture he delivered to the Swedish Academy on 13 December 1923, titled "The Irish Dramatic Movement". The version of the lecture that was included in The Bounty of Sweden was written by Yeats from memory after his return to Dublin. The preface to the book is dated 15 June 1924, it was published in July 1925. The Bounty of Sweden also includes "Stockholm: A Meditation". "Stockholm: A Meditation" was printed in The Dial and The London Mercury in 1925 prior to its inclusion in the Bounty of Sweden in 1925.

Yeats referred to the work as a ""bread and butter" letter to Sweden & at last a part of my autobiography".
