= Ego Dominus Tuus =

Poem by W. B. Yeats

Ego Dominus Tuus, Latin for "I am your lord", sometimes translated as "I am your master", is a poem by the Irish poet William Butler Yeats. It was published in the 1918 book Per Amica Silentia Lunae, where it introduced some of Yeats's essays, and collected with other poems in The Wild Swans at Coole (1919). The title is taken from Dante's La Vita Nuova: the words "ego dominus tuus" are spoken to Dante in a dream by the personification of Love. The two characters of the poem, Hic and Ille, are Latin words meaning this man and that man, respectively. Ezra Pound identified Ille with 'Willie', or Yeats: the poem covers many characteristic themes of Yeats, in particular the image of the mask and the concept of the double or "anti-self". The dialogue of Hic and Ille treats the poetry of Dante, John Keats, and Yeats himself, contrasting the words of each poet with the experience of their lives.

Susan J. Wolfson writes, "Yeats remembered Verlaine telling him, in 1894, of living, not even struggling, in Paris, "like a fly in a pot of marmalade".
