= An Irish Airman Foresees His Death =

1919 poem by William Butler Yeats

- by William Butler Yeats
- Written: 1918
- First published in: 1919
- Country: Ireland
- Language: English
- Meter: Iambic tetrameter
- Rhyme scheme: ABAB CDCD EFEF GHGH
- Publisher: Macmillan
- Publication date: 1919
- Media type: Paperback
- Lines: 16
- OCLC: 48380639
- Preceded by: In Memory of Major Robert Gregory
- Followed by: Men Improve with the Years

Full text
- The Wild Swans at Coole (Collection)/An Irish Airman Foresees his Death at Wikisource

"An Irish Airman Foresees His Death" is a poem by Irish poet William Butler Yeats (1865–1939), written in 1918 and first published in the Macmillan edition of The Wild Swans at Coole in 1919. The poem is a soliloquy given by an aviator in the First World War in which the narrator describes the circumstances surrounding his imminent death. The poem is a work that discusses the role of Irish soldiers fighting for the United Kingdom during a time when they were trying to establish independence for Ireland. Wishing to show restraint from publishing political poems during the height of the war, Yeats withheld publication of the poem until after the conflict had ended.

== Poem ==
I know that I shall meet my fate
Somewhere among the clouds above;
Those that I fight I do not hate
Those that I guard I do not love;

My country is Kiltartan Cross,
My countrymen Kiltartan’s poor,
No likely end could bring them loss
Or leave them happier than before.

Nor law, nor duty bade me fight,
Nor public men, nor cheering crowds,
A lonely impulse of delight
Drove to this tumult in the clouds;

I balanced all, brought all to mind,
The years to come seemed waste of breath,
A waste of breath the years behind
In balance with this life, this death.

== Background and interpretation ==
The airman in the poem is widely believed to be Major Robert Gregory, a friend of Yeats and the only child of Augusta, Lady Gregory.

== Structure ==
The poem contains 16 lines of text arranged in iambic tetrameter. The rhyme scheme is arranged in four quatrains of ABAB.

== Cultural influence ==
=== Literature ===
The title of John Patrick Shanley's play A Lonely Impulse of Delight (1985) comes from the poem. Furthermore, quotes from the poem are included in Jawaharlal Nehru's The Discovery of India (1946), Mahmoud Darwish's poem "As He Walks Away" (in Why Did You Leave the Horse Alone?, 1995), and Pat Barker's The Silence of the Girls (2018).

=== Music ===
Musical settings of the poem are performed by various singers and groups, including Angelo Branduardi (on Branduardi canta Yeats, 1986), Shane MacGowan of The Pogues (on Now and in Time to Be, 1997) and The Waterboys (on An Appointment with Mr Yeats, 2011). Additionally, the British rock group Keane based their song "A Bad Dream" (on Under the Iron Sea, 2006) on the poem.

=== Film and television ===
The poem is quoted in the movies Memphis Belle (1990) and Congo (1995), as well as in an episode of the second series of In the Flesh (2014).

== See also ==
- List of works by William Butler Yeats
