= The Scholars (poem) =

1914 poem by William Butler Yeats

"The Scholars" is a poem written by the Irish poet William Butler Yeats. It was written between 1914 and April 1915, and is included in the 1919 collection The Wild Swans at Coole.

Bald heads forgetful of their sins,
Old, learned, respectable bald heads
Edit and annotate the lines
That young men, tossing on their beds,
Rhymed out in love's despair
To flatter beauty's ignorant ear.

They'll cough in the ink to the world's end;
Wear out the carpet with their shoes
Earning respect; have no strange friend;
If they have sinned nobody knows.
Lord, what would they say
Did their Catullus walk that way?
