= The Wild Swans at Coole =

Poetry collections by William Butler Yeats

First US edition (1919 publ. Macmillan Publishers) Jacket design by Sturge Moore

The Wild Swans at Coole is the name of two collections of poetry by W. B. Yeats, published in 1917 and 1919.

== Publication history ==
The Wild Swans at Coole, a collection of twenty-nine poems and the play At the Hawk's Well, was first published by the Cuala Press in November 1917. The title poem of the collection had first appeared in the Little Review in June of that year. Macmillan (London and New York) republished the poems in March 1919 without the play but with an additional seventeen poems. The completed volume, also called The Wild Swans at Coole, represents the "middle stage" of Yeats' writing and is concerned, amongst other themes, with Irish nationalism and the creation of an Irish aesthetic.

== Poems in The Wild Swans at Coole (1917) ==
- "The Wild Swans at Coole"
- "Men Improve with the Years"
- "The Collar-Bone of a Hare"
- "Lines Written in Dejection"
- "The Dawn"
- "On Woman"
- "The Fisherman"
- "The Hawk"
- "Memory"
- "Her Praise"
- "The People"
- "His Phoenix"
- "A Thought from Propertius"
- "Broken Dreams"
- "A Deep-sworn Vow"
- "Presences"
- "The Balloon of the Mind"
- "To a Squirrel at Kyle-na-gno"
- "On being asked for a War Poem"
- "In Memory"
- "Upon a Dying Lady"
- "Ego Dominus Tuus"
- "The Scholars"

== Poems in The Wild Swans at Coole (1919) ==
- "The Wild Swans at Coole"
- "In Memory of Major Robert Gregory"
- "An Irish Airman Foresees his Death"
- "Men improve with the Years"
- "The Collar-Bone of a Hare"
- "Under the Round Tower"
- "Solomon to Sheba"
- "The Living Beauty"
- "A Song"
- "To a Young Beauty"
- "To a Young Girl"
- "The Scholars"
- "Tom O'Roughley"
- "The Sad Shepherd"
- "Lines written in Dejection"
- "The Dawn"
- "On Woman"
- "The Fisherman"
- "The Hawk"
- "Memory"
- "Her Praise"
- "The People"
- "His Phoenix"
- "A Thought from Propertius"
- "Broken Dreams"
- "A Deep-Sworn Vow"
- "Presences"
- "The Balloon of the Mind"
- "To a Squirrel at Kyle-Na-Gno"
- "On being asked for a War Poem"
- "In Memory of Alfred Pollexfen"
- "Upon a Dying Lady"
- "Ego Dominus Tuus"
- "A Prayer on going into my House"
- "The Phases of the Moon"
- "The Cat and the Moon"
- "The Saint and the Hunchback"
- "Two Songs of a Fool"
- "Another Song of a Fool"
- "The Double Vision of Michael Robartes*"

== See also ==
- 1917 in poetry
- 1919 in poetry
