= Thoor Ballylee =

Tower in County Galway, Ireland

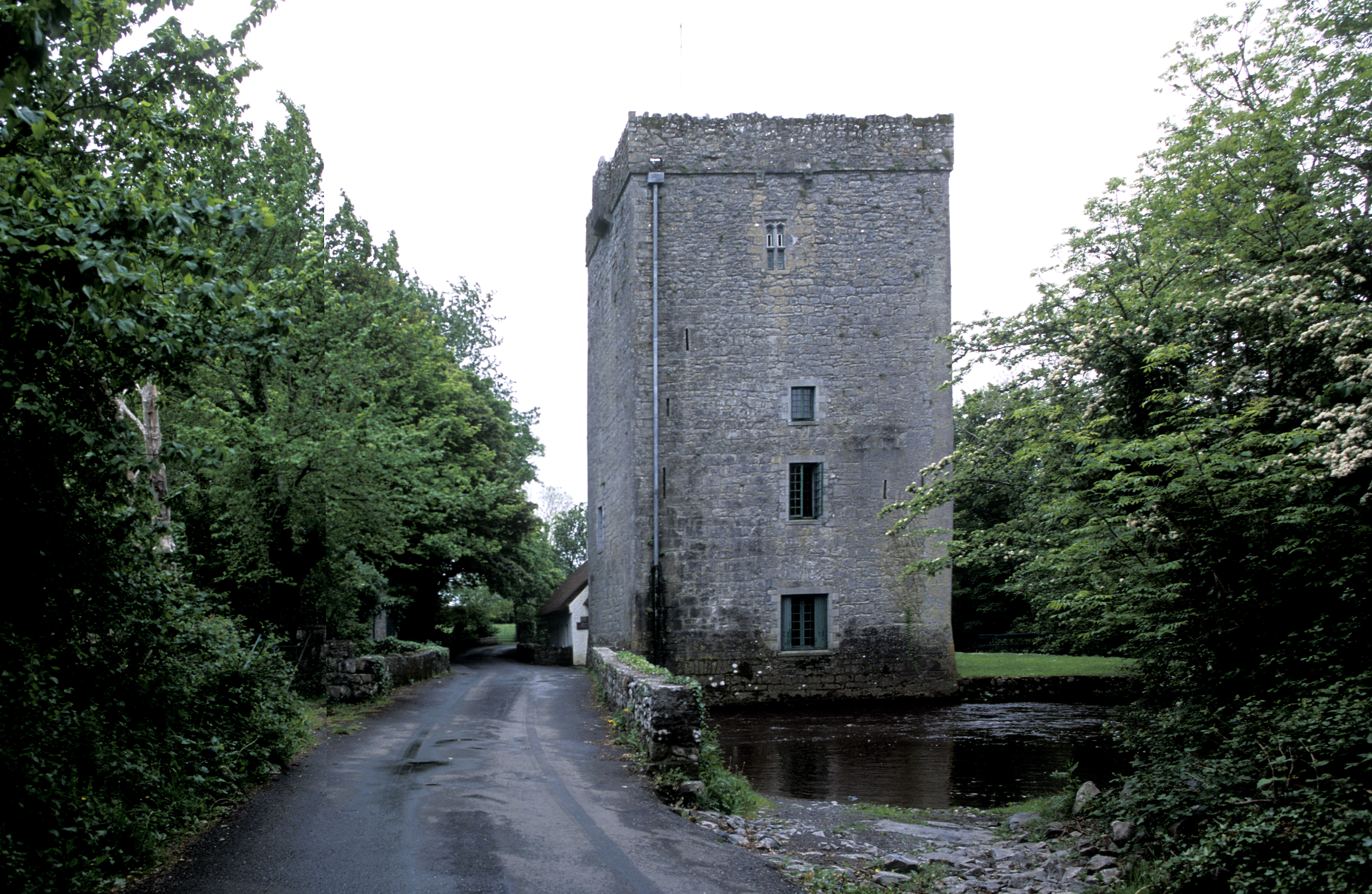

- Location within Ireland

General information
- Type: Tower house
- Location: County Galway, Ireland
- Coordinates: 53.103°N 8.775°W

Renovating team
- Architects: William Butler Yeats, William A. Scott

Thoor Ballylee Castle (Irish Túr Bhaile Uí Laí) is a fortified, 15th-century Anglo-Norman tower house built by the septs de Burgo, or Burke, near the town of Gort in County Galway, Ireland. It is also known as Yeats's Tower because it was once owned and inhabited by the poet William Butler Yeats.

It has been described as "the most important public building in Ireland" by late Nobel laureate Seamus Heaney.

== History ==
The stone castle was built in the 15th century and originally formed part of the huge estates of the Earls of Clanricarde, from the de Burgo or Burke family.

The nearby four-arched bridge dates to around 1825. In 1837, the Carrig family was recorded as living in the castle. At the time of Griffith's Valuation (1857), Patrick Carrick was leasing a herd's house, castle and land at Ballylee, barony of Kiltartan, from William Henry Gregory. At the time, the property was valued at £5.

In the early 1900s, the castle/tower was still owned by the Gregory family and became part of nearby Coole Estate, home of Lady Augusta Gregory, Yeats's lifelong friend. On the estate, Coole House, where Lady Gregory lived, was the centre for meetings for the Irish literary group, a group composed of a great number of preeminent figures of the day. Near this tower, in Coole Park, began the Irish Literary Revival.

Thoor Ballylee is also known today as Yeats's Tower, because in 1916 (or 1917) Yeats purchased the property for the nominal sum of £35 because he was so enchanted with it and especially as it was located in a rural area. From 1921 to 1929, Yeats and his family lived there as it was his monument and symbol: In both aspects, it satisfied his desire for a rooted place in the countryside. The tower retained its original windows in the upper part. Yeats and his architect, William A. Scott, restored the tower for the next two years and installed larger windows in the lower floors.

As he had an affinity for the Irish language, Yeats dropped the term "castle" in naming the property and replaced it with Thoor (Túr), the Irish word for "tower"; thus, the place has been known as Thoor Ballylee. For twelve years, Thoor Ballylee was Yeats's summer home as it was his country retreat. In a letter to a friend, he wrote, "Everything is so beautiful that to go elsewhere is to leave beauty behind." Consequently, it is no wonder that Yeats was inspired and compelled to create literary works at Ballylee such as poems like The Tower and Coole Park and Ballylee.

In 1929, Ballylee was abandoned as the Yeats family moved out and it fell to disuse and ruin.

In 1951, a scene of John Ford's The Quiet Man in which John Wayne and Maureen O'Hara cross a river was shot next to Thoor Ballylee.

Mary Hanley (1914–1979) was the founder of the Kiltartan Society. A native of Carron, County Clare, Hanley founded the society in 1961 to foster interest in the literary history of the district, especially that of Lady Gregory, Edward Martyn and Yeats. She was responsible for the restoration of Thoor Ballylee (with the aid of Bord Fáilte and the Yeats family). At the time, the Office of Public Works was owner of the property. Hanley persuaded the poet Padraic Colum to open the castle on Sunday 20 June 1965, the centenary of Yeats's birth, as Yeats's Tower to appear as it was when he lived there and refitted as a Yeats museum containing a collection of first editions and items of furniture. The adjoining miller's cottage became a tea room and shop. This was later expanded by a newly constructed building in the back.

== Today ==
Due to its proximity to the Streamstown River, Thoor Ballylee is subject to sporadic flooding. In 2009, the tower was extensively damaged by flooding. Only in February 2012 did work by Fáilte Ireland on restoring the tower begin. One of the forces behind the decision to repair the tower had been East Galway senator Lorraine Higgins, who argued that a reopened Yeats's Tower would be a boon to local tourism. The tower reopened in June 2015 for the 150th anniversary of Yeats's birth. Despite damage from Storm Desmond in December 2015, the tower has been open every summer since.

== Architecture ==
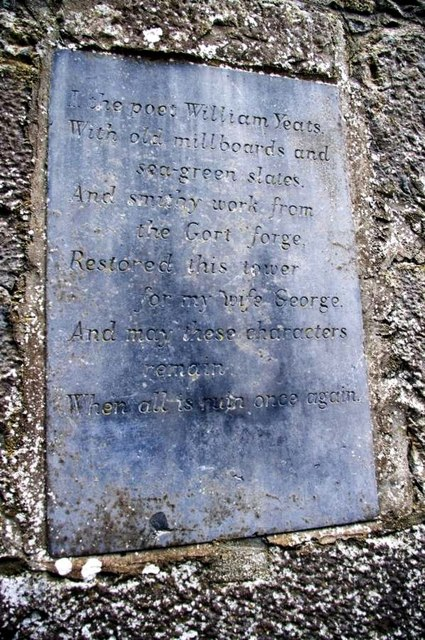
Inscription on tower composed by W. B. Yeats

With four floors, the tower consists of one room on each floor that is connected by a spiral stone stairway built into the seven-foot thickness of the massive outer wall. Each floor has a window that overlooks the Streamstown River that flows alongside the tower. There is a small thatch cottage attached.

Yeats described the ground-floor chamber as "the pleasantest room I have yet seen, a great wide window opening over the river and a round arched door leading to the thatched hall". He also admired the mural stair, symbolically declaring "This winding, gyring, spiring treadmill of a stair is my ancestral stair; That Goldsmith and the Dean, Berkeley and Burke have traveled there."

There is a tablet on the wall that commemorates Yeats's sojourn:

I, the poet William Yeats,
With old mill boards and sea-green slates,
And smithy work from the Gort forge,
Restored this tower for my wife George.
And may these characters remain
When all is ruin once again.

== See also ==
- William Butler Yeats
