= A Prayer for My Daughter =

Poem by William Butler Yeats

- by William Butler Yeats
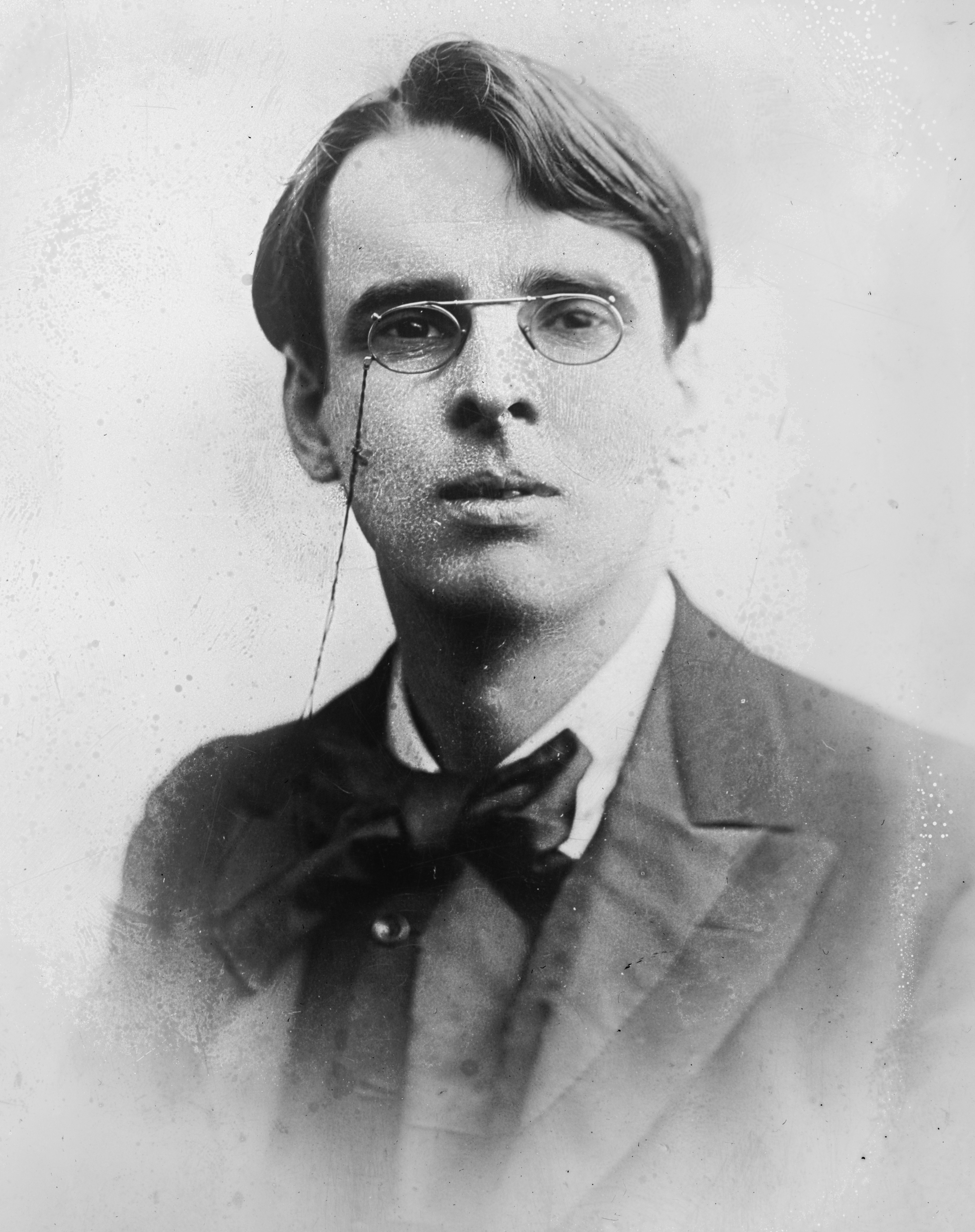
- Photograph of William Butler Yeats
- Written: 1919
- First published in: 1919
- Country: Ireland
- Language: English
- Subject(s): Irish Nationalism, parenthood
- Publication date: November 1919 issue of Poetry magazine

"A Prayer for My Daughter" is a poem by William Butler Yeats written in 1919 shortly after the birth of his daughter, Anne Yeats. The poem was first published in the November 1919 issue of Poetry magazine (volume XV), edited by Harriet Monroe, and later included in Yeats' 1921 poetry collection Michael Robartes and the Dancer. It is written to Anne, his daughter with Georgie Hyde-Lees, whom Yeats married after his last marriage proposal to Maud Gonne was rejected in 1916. Yeats composed the poem while staying in a tower at Thoor Ballylee during the Anglo-Irish War, two days after Anne's birth on 26 February 1919. The poem reflects Yeats's complicated views on Irish Nationalism and sexuality, and is considered an important work of Modernist poetry.

== Background ==
The poem begins by describing "storm" which is a "howling", and his newborn daughter, sleeping "half hid" in her cradle, and protected somewhat from the storm. The storm, which can in part be read as symbolizing the Irish War of Independence, overshadows the birth of Yeats' daughter and creates the political frame that sets the text into historical context. In stanza two, the setting for the poem is revealed as being "the tower", a setting for many of Yeats's poems, including the book of poems entitled The Tower (1928). This is Thoor Ballylee, an ancient Norman tower in Galway, which Yeats had bought in 1917 and where he intended making a home.

Conflicts between Ireland and the United Kingdom were common subjects of Yeats' poetry, including his notable poems about the Dublin Lockout ("September 1913") and the Easter Rising ("Easter, 1916"). David Holdeman suggests that this poem "carries over from 'The Second Coming'" in the tone it uses to describe the political situation facing Ireland at the end of World War One and with the formation of the Irish Republican Army.

== Structure ==
The poem contains ten stanzas of eight lines each: two rhymed couplets followed by a quatrain of enclosed rhyme. Many of the rhyme pairs use slant rhyme. The stanza may be seen as a variation on ottava rima, an eight-lined stanza used in other Yeats poems, such as Among School Children and Sailing to Byzantium.

Metrical analysis of the poem, according to Robert Einarsson, proves difficult because he believes Yeats adheres to "rhythmical motifs" rather than traditional use of syllables in his meter. In stanza two, Einarsson points out instances where the meter of the poem contains examples of amphibrachic, pyrrhicretic, and spondaic feet. He argues that the complexity of Yeats's verse follows patterns of its "metremes", or rhymical motifs, rather than common metrical devices.

The poem also may be read to consist of straightforward iambic verse that relies on common metrical devices such as elision, acephalous lines, promotion, and metrical inversion. Lines 1, 2, 3, 5, and 8 of each stanza are iambic pentameter; lines 4, 6, and 7 are iambic tetrameter. For instance, using traditional principles of scansion, stanza two may be scanned as shown below, where syllables in all caps represent metrical beats, lower-case syllables represent metrical off-beats, the vertical bar represents the termination of a metrical foot, and apostrophes represent elisions. The number of metrical feet per line is marked in parentheses at the end of each line:

I'ave WALKED | and PRAYED | for THIS | young CHILD | an HOUR (5)
and HEARD | the SEA- | wind SCREAM | upON | the TOWER, (5)
and UND- | er th'ARCH- | es OF | the BRIDGE, | and SCREAM (5)
in th'ELMS | aBOVE | the FLOOD- | ed STREAM; (4)
imAG- | 'ning IN | exCIT- | ed REV- | erIE (5)
THAT | the FUT- | ure YEARS | had COME, (4)
DANC- | ing TO | a FRENZ- | ied DRUM, (4)
OUT of | the MURD- | 'rous INN- | ocence OF | the SEA. (5)

== Critical reception ==
As the poem reflects Yeats's expectations for his young daughter, feminist critiques of the poem have questioned the poet's general approach to women through the text's portrayal of women in society. In Yeats's Ghosts, Brenda Maddox suggests that the poem is "designed deliberately to offend women" and labels it as "offensive". Maddox argues that Yeats, in the poem, condemns his daughter to adhere to 19th-century ideals of womanhood, as he focuses on her need for a husband and a "Big House" with a private income.

Joyce Carol Oates suggests that Yeats used the poem to deprive his daughter of sensuality as he envisions a "crushingly conventional" view of womanhood, wishing her to become a "flourishing hidden tree" instead of allowing her the freedoms given to male children. This was after Yeats was rejected in marriage by Maud Gonne. In Oates' opinion, Yeats wishes his daughter to become like a "vegetable:immobile, unthinking, and placid."

Majorie Elizabeth Howes, in Yeats's Nations, suggests that the crisis facing the Anglo-Irish community in "A Prayer for My Daughter" is that of female sexual choice. But, she also argues that to read the poem without the political context surrounding the Irish Revolution robs the text of a deeper meaning that goes beyond the relationship between Yeats and the female sex.

== See also ==
- 1921 in poetry
