= The Gift of Harun Al-Raschid =

Song

The Gift of Harun Al-Raschid, written in 1923, is a poem by the Irish poet William Butler Yeats, first published in 1924 in the American journal The Dial in a collection of The Cat and the Moon and Certain Poems. The poem was then published in his prose book A Vision in 1925 and was included in Yeats's collection of The Tower, which was published in 1928.

The poem was presented in a form of a letter from Kusta Ben Luka to Abd Al-Rabban, Treasurer to the Caliph of Baghdad.

== Inspiration ==
Many believe that The Gift of Harun Al-Raschid was inspired by Yeats' marriage and, specifically, served as an ode to the kind of love that he shared with his wife Georgie Hyde-Lees. For context, one can turn to Yeats' years of obsessive infatuation with Maud Gonne, an English heiress who rejected his marriage proposal three times. She became his muse and the subject of several of his poems written within a span of at least 20 years. When the poet finally ended his ties with Gonne, he proposed marriage to Lees in 1917 and was accepted. The marriage was surprisingly successful despite the 27-year age gap. The poem extolled the ideal love that blossomed from the marriage for it involved the union of two souls. In the poem, Yeats referred to Georgie as a gift who came to him "unknown and unloved" but became the woman who "can shake more blossom from autumnal chill than all my bursting springtime knew."

Aside from serving as a metaphor for his marriage and his vision of love, Yeats also loosely borrowed from the fiction of The Arabian Nights to articulate his fascination for the desert culture of the Middle East as well as the occult. He embedded this in a pastiche that also expressed his interest in knowledge. The poet has been vocal about his affection for the Arabian Nights, placing the 1923 J. C. Mardrus–Edward Powys Mathers' translation of the text second to Shakespeare among all the works that most moved him.
