= Modernist mythopoeia =

In modernist literature, mythopoeia - the creating of myth or the creative use of existing mythological frameworks - served a crucial structural and philosophical function. For modernist writers, this was not a nostalgic revival of ancient stories but a deliberate aesthetic strategy to impose order and meaning upon the profound fragmentation, disillusionment, and spiritual uncertainty that characterized modern experience.

The modernist engagement with myth can be seen as a response to the collapse of traditional metaphysical certainties. As the movement grappled with a "growing alienation" from prevailing norms, myth offered a method to explore what scholar Scott Freer describes as "metaphysical perspectives that fall between material secularism and dogmatic religion". This placed mythopoeia at the heart of modernist experimentation with form and belief.

== T. S. Eliot and the "Mythical Method" ==
T. S. Eliot provided the critical foundation for this approach. In his 1923 essay "Ulysses, Order, and Myth," he famously praised James Joyce's use of Homeric parallel as a "mythical method," declaring it "a way of controlling, of ordering, of giving a shape and a significance to the immense panorama of futility and anarchy which is contemporary history".

Eliot employed this method in his own work, most notably in The Waste Land (1922). The poem uses the anthropological motif of the Fisher King and the wasteland, derived from Sir James George Frazer's The Golden Bough and Jessie L. Weston's From Ritual to Romance, as a unifying framework. This "mythical method" allowed him to juxtapose the spiritual sterility of the post-World War I world with ancient symbols of death and potential regeneration, creating a powerful collage of cultural fragments.

== W. B. Yeats and Personal Mythological Systems ==
W. B. Yeats constructed an elaborate, private mythological system. Drawing from Irish folklore, mystical philosophy (including Hermeticism and Theosophy), and his own symbolic theories, Yeats created a cosmology to interpret history and human psychology.

- A Living System: His concepts like the historical gyres (spiraling cones) and the phases of the moon, detailed in A Vision, provided a mythic structure for his poetry. This system allowed him to address contemporary chaos, as in the apocalyptic vision of "The Second Coming," with the authority of a prophetic, self-created tradition. For Yeats, myth was a living, imaginative force, not a static inheritance.

== D. H. Lawrence, Myth, and the Primal Self ==
D. H. Lawrence used myth to explore the primal, instinctual dimensions of human experience that he felt were suppressed by industrial modernity and rationalism. His works frequently engage with mythic archetypes to access what he considered a deeper, more essential self.

As noted in scholarship, his 1923 poetry collection Birds, Beasts and Flowers exemplifies a modernist mythopoeic aesthetic by using creatures and natural phenomena as symbols to reconnect with a non-human, elemental consciousness. Lawrence sought to rediscover a sacred, immanent power within the natural world through a mythopoetic lens.

== James Joyce: Myth as Structural Scaffold ==
James Joyce's Ulysses (1922) is the archetypal application of Eliot's "mythical method." By mapping the ordinary events of a single day in Dublin (June 16, 1904) onto the epic journeys of Homer's Odyssey, Joyce creates a continuous parallel between antiquity and modernity.

- Function of the Scaffold: The mythic framework does not elevate the characters to heroic status in a traditional sense. Instead, it provides an ironic, tragic, and deeply human counterpoint, highlighting both the enduring nature of human experience (desire, loss, homecoming) and its reduction in the modern urban landscape. The mythic structure organizes the novel's immense formal experimentation and stream-of-consciousness narrative.

== Later scholarly frameworks ==
Twentyfirst century academic work has solidified the importance of mythopoeia to modernism. Scott Freer, in Modernist Mythopoeia: The Twilight of the Gods (2015), argues that this practice was a definitive formal experiment aimed at expressing a post-secular "range of metaphysical perspectives". Similarly, the chapter "Modernist Mythopoeia" in The Edinburgh Companion to Modernism, Myth and Religion (2023) positions it as a distinctive aesthetic for navigating ideas of the sacred in a secular age.
