= 1921 in poetry =

Nationality words link to articles with information on the nation's poetry or literature (for instance, Irish or France).

== Events ==
- March — Jorge Luis Borges returns to his birthplace, Buenos Aires in Argentina, after a period living with his family in Europe.
- August 3 — Russian poet Nikolay Gumilyov's fate is sealed when he is arrested in the Soviet Union by the Cheka on charges of being a monarchist; on August 24 the Petrograd Cheka decrees execution of all 61 participants of the "Tagantsev Conspiracy", including Gumilyov. The exact dates and locations of their executions and burials are still unknown. He had divorced Russian poet Anna Akhmatova in 1918.
- Autumn–Winter — T. S. Eliot works on The Waste Land in Margate and Lausanne.
- December 31 — Mexican poet Manuel Maples Arce distributes the first Stridentist manifesto, Comprimido estridentista, in the broadsheet Actual n°1 (Mexico City).
- Mrs. C. A. Dawson-Scott founds PEN, an international Association of Poets, Playwrights, Editors, Essayists and Novelists, in London with John Galsworthy, who becomes the organisation's first President; first members include Joseph Conrad, George Bernard Shaw and H. G. Wells

== Works published in English ==
=== Australia ===
- C. J. Dennis, A Book for Kids
- Lesbia Harford, special issue of Birth (Melbourne, May) devoted to her poetry
- John Shaw Neilson, "The Orange Tree"
- John O'Brien, Around the Boree Log and Other Verses

=== Canada ===
- Arthur Bourinot, Poems. Toronto: T.H. Best.
- Wilson MacDonald, The Miracle Songs Of Jesus. Toronto: W. MacDonald.

=== India in Indian poetry in English ===
- Sri Aurobindo, Love and Death, long poem about the triumph of love over death, concerning the Ruru-Priyumvada legend (somewhat like the Greek Orpheus-Eurydice and the Indian Satvitri-Satyavan myths)
- Toru Dutt, Life and Letters of Toru Dutt, London, Milford: Oxford University Press, Indian poet, writing in English, published in the United Kingdom
- Maneck B. Pithawalla, A Wedding Feast, Karachi: M. B. Pithawalla* Poets of John Company, Calcutta: Tahcker, Spink and Co., 134 pages; anthology
- K. S. R. Sastry, The Epic of Indian Womanhood, Madras: Imperial Trading Co.
- Puran Singh, The Sisters of the Spinning Wheel and Other Sikh Poems, London: Dent
- Nanikram Vasanmal Thadani, Ashoka and Other Poems, Delhi: self-published

=== United Kingdom ===
- Nancy Cunard, Outlaws
- Walter de la Mare, The Veil, and Other Poems
- Toru Dutt, Life and Letters of Toru Dutt, London: Milford, Oxford University Press, Indian poet, writing in English, published in the United Kingdom
- T. S. Eliot, The Metaphysical Poets, critical essay on the Metaphysical poets of the 16th and 17th centuries (text here)
- Robert Graves, The Pier-Glass
- D. H. Lawrence, Tortoises
- Bertram Lloyd, ed., The Great Kinship: An Anthology of Humanitarian Poetry
- Charlotte Mew, Saturday Market
- Vita Sackville-West, Orchard and Vineyard
- John Collings Squire, Collected Parodies
- Flora Thompson, Bog-Myrtle and Peat
- W. B. Yeats, Irish author published in the United Kingdom:
  - Michael Robartes and the Dancer, includes "The Second Coming" and "A Prayer For My Daughter"
  - Four Plays for Dancers, adds "At the Hawk's Well" and "Calvary" to Two Plays for Dancers, published in 1919

=== United States ===
- Conrad Aiken, Punch: The Immoratal Liar
- Sherwood Anderson, The Triumph of the Egg
- John Gould Fletcher, Breakers and Granite
- Zona Gale, The Secret Way
- H.D., Hymen
- Langston Hughes, "The Negro Speaks of Rivers", in The Crisis
- Amy Lowell, Legends
- Edna St. Vincent Millay, Second April
- Marianne Moore, Poems
- Ezra Pound, Poems 1918–1921, New York
- Charles Reznikoff, A Fourth Group of Verse
- Edward Arlington Robinson, Avon's Harvest
- William Carlos Williams, Sour Grapes
- Yvor Winters, The Immobile Wind
- Elinor Wylie, Nets to Catch the Wind

=== Other in English ===
- W. B. Yeats, Irish author published in the United Kingdom:
  - Michael Robartes and the Dancer, includes "The Second Coming" and "A Prayer For My Daughter"
  - Four Plays for Dancers, adds "At the Hawk's Well" and "Calvary" to Two Plays for Dancers, published in 1919

== Works published in other languages ==
=== France ===
- André Breton, Les Champs magnétiques
- Max Jacob, Le Laboratoire central
- Francis Jammes:
  - Épitaphes, Paris: Librairie de l'Art catholic
  - Le Tombeau de Jean de la Fontaine, Paris: Mercure de France
- Pierre Reverdy, Étoiles peintes
- Paul-Jean Toulet, Les Contrerimes, French

=== Indian subcontinent ===
Including all of the British colonies that later became India, Pakistan, Bangladesh, Sri Lanka and Nepal. Listed alphabetically by first name, regardless of surname:

- Amir Minai, Mina-yi, Urdu-language
- Basavaraju Appa Rao, Basavaraju Appa Rao Gitalu, Telugu-language
- Dimbeshwar Neog, Malika, Assamese-language
- Govindagraj, Vagvaijayanti, 160 poems, including love poems and verses on social and mystic topics; with an introduction by N. C. Kelkar, Marathi-language
- Padmadhar Chaliha, Svaraj Sangit, Indian, Assamese-language
- Vallathol Narayana Menon, Magdalana Mariyam, a Malayalam khanda kavya about a repentant Mary consoled by Christ
- Viswanatha Satyanarayana, Andhra paurusamu, Indian, Telugu-language, written in 1917 but printed in book form this year

=== Other languages ===
- Anna Akhmatova, Plantain, Russian
- August Alle, Carmina Barbata, Estonian
- J. C. Bloem, Het verlangen, Dutch
- António Botto, Canções (Songs), Portuguese
- H. Leivick, The Golem, "dramatic poem in eight scenes", Yiddish
- Federico García Lorca, Libro de poemas (Book of Poems), Spain
- Nikolay Gumilyov, The Pillar of Fire, Russian
- Alexander Lernet-Holenia, Pastorale Austria
- Bernardo Ortiz de Montellano, Avidez, Mexico
- Carlos Pellicer, Colores en el mar (Colors in the Sea), Mexico
- Ramón López Velarde, La suave patria, Mexico

== Births ==
Death years link to the corresponding "[year] in poetry" article (Indian poets listed by first name, when listed alphabetically, whether or not it is a surname):

- January 7 – Chester Kallman (died 1975), American poet, librettist and translator best known for collaborations with Igor Stravinsky
- January 15 – Raymond Souster (died 2012), Canadian poet
- January 31 – Kurt Marti (died 2017), Swiss theologian and poet
- March 1 – Richard Wilbur (died 2017), American poet
- April 6 – Marie Ponsot (died 2019), née Birmingham, American poet, literary critic, essayist, teacher and translator
- April 13 – Max Harris (died 1995), Australian poet, critic, columnist, commentator, publisher and bookseller
- April 24 – Gabriel Okara (died 2019), Nigerian poet and novelist
- May 9:
  - Daniel Berrigan (died 2016), American Jesuit priest, poet and anti-war activist
  - Mona Van Duyn (died 2004), American poet
- June 14 – John Bradburne (killed 1979), English poet and missionary
- June 15 – James Emanuel (died 2013), African-American poet and scholar
- June 27 – Lex Banning (died 1965), Australian poet born with cerebral palsy and unable to speak clearly or to write with a pen
- June 29 – Vasko Popa (died 1991), Serbian poet
- July 5 – Nanos Valaoritis (died 2019), Greek poet, novelist and playwright
- August 14 – Julia Hartwig (died 2017), Polish poet
- August 16 – Shiv K. Kumar (died 2017), Indian, English-language poet, playwright and fiction writer
- August 18 – Frédéric Jacques Temple (died 2020), French poet and writer
- August 21 – Devarakonda Balagangadhara Tilak (died 1966), Telugu-language poet and story writer
- August 31 – Hayden Carruth (died 2008), American poet and literary critic
- September 2 – Shukrullo (died 2020), Uzbek poet
- October 9 – Tadeusz Różewicz (died 2014), Polish poet, dramatist and writer
- October 13 – Dimitris Tsaloumas (died 2016), Greek-born Australian poet, resident in Australia from 1952
- October 17 – George Mackay Brown (died 1996), Scottish poet, author and dramatist
- December 25 – Nan McDonald (died 1974), Australian poet and editor
- December 26 – Adebayo Faleti (died 2017), Nigerian poet, journalist, playwright, actor, broadcaster and translator
- Also:
  - Divya Prabha Bharali, Indian, Assamese-language poet; a woman
  - Kathan Singh Jamal, Indian, Dogri-Pahadi-language poet
  - Khizar Maghribi, Indian writer of parodies and humorous verse in the Kashmiri language
  - Mangalacharan Chattopadhyay, Indian, Bengali-language Marxist poet
  - Parsram Rohra (died 1981), Indian, Sindhi-language
  - Ramkrishna Sharma (died 1986), Indian, Nepali-language critic, essayist, poet and short-story writer called the father of modern literary criticism in Nepali
  - Rasananda Sahu, Indian, Oriya poet and novelist
  - Shambhoo Nath Bhatt Haleem, Indian, Kashmiri-language poet and children's author
  - Sarachchandra Muktibodh (died 1984), Indian, Marathi-language poet and novelist
  - Shrikrishna Powale (died 1974), Indian, Marathi-language poet in the "Sthandil" Cult of Kusumagraj and Kant
  - Sugan Ahuja (died 1966), Indian, Sindhi-language poet and short-story writer

== Deaths ==
Birth years link to the corresponding "[year] in poetry" article (Indian poets listed by first name, when listed alphabetically, whether or not it is a surname):

- January 13 – Francis William Bourdillon, 68, British poet and translator
- February 15 – Akbar Allahabadi, 74, Indian, Urdu-language poet known for his satire
- April 21 – Rosa Mulholland, Lady Gilbert (born 1841), Irish novelist, short-story writer and poet
- May 26 – Donald Evans (born 1884), American poet, publisher, music critic and journalist
- June 18 – G. H. Gibson, "Ironbark" (born 1846), Australian
- August 7 – Alexander Blok, 40, Russian poet known for his lyrics
- circa August 25 – Nikolay Gumilyov, 35, Russian poet and former husband of Russian poet Anna Akhmatova (executed – see Events, above)
- September 2 – Henry Austin Dobson, 61 (born 1840), English poet and essayist
- September 11 – Subramania Bharati (born 1882), Indian, Tamil-language writer, poet, journalist, Indian independence activist and social reformer, also writing Indian poetry in English
- September 13 – James Hebblethwaite (born 1857), English-born Australian poet, teacher and clergyman
- September 26 – Matei Donici, 74 (born 1847), Romanian poet and Imperial Russian Army general
- November 21 – Ernest Myers, 77, English poet and classicist
- Also:
  - Va. Ba. Patavardhan (born 1870), Indian, Marathi-language critic and poet

== Awards and honors ==
- Pulitzer Prize for Poetry: no award given

== See also ==
- Poetry
- List of years in poetry
