= The Rose Tree (poem) =

1921 poem by William Butler Yeats

The Rose Tree is a poem by William Butler Yeats. It was published in 1921 as part of his collection Michael Robartes and the Dancer.

== Synopsis ==
It describes a fictional conversation between James Connolly and Patrick Pearse, the leaders of the 1916 Easter Rising. First, Pearse says that a "breath of politic words" or a "wind that blows / across the bitter sea" (Britain) might have withered their "Rose Tree," or, Ireland. Connolly replies that the tree "needs to be but watered." Pearse then says that "all the wells are parched away," and argues for the necessity of blood sacrifice, saying that only their "own red blood / can make a right Rose Tree".

== Background ==
The description of Ireland symbolised as a tree that needs to be watered, and of the necessity of bloodshed for its protection, is likely to be influenced by the ballad "Ireland's Liberty Tree" that ends with the lines:

Let each son of Erin contribute
Whate'er in his power doth lie;
The pure blood of Ireland's Martyrs
Gave it strength, and it shall never die.
Then gather beneath its broad branches,
All ye who dare strive to be free,
And Heaven will surely protect those
Who guard Ireland's Liberty-Tree!
