= The Tower (poem) =

Poem

"The Tower" is a poem by the Irish poet William Butler Yeats. It is the second poem in The Tower, a 1928 collection of Yeats' poems.

The poem features Yeats wrestling with his old age. He contemplates the foolish actions of his neighbors and wonders how they responded to their own aging, then celebrates the Anglo-Irish people and offers them his "faith and pride" as an inheritance.

== Excerpt ==
What shall I do with this absurdity —
O heart, O troubled heart — this caricature,
Decrepit age that has been tied to me
As to a dog's tail?
Never had I more
Excited, passionate, fantastical
Imagination, nor an ear and eye
That more expected the impossible —
No, not in boyhood when with rod and fly,
Or the humbler worm, I climbed Ben Bulben's back
And had the livelong summer day to spend.
It seems that I must bid the Muse go pack,
Choose Plato and Plotinus for a friend
Until imagination, ear and eye,
Can be content with argument and deal
In abstract things; or be derided by
A sort of battered kettle at the heel.
