= Michael Robartes and the Dancer =

Poetry book by W. B. Yeats

Michael Robartes and the Dancer is a 1921 book of poems by W. B. Yeats.

It includes the poems:

1. Michael Robartes and the Dancer
2. Solomon and the Witch
3. An Image from a Past Life
4. Under Saturn
5. Easter, 1916
6. Sixteen Dead Men
7. The Rose Tree
8. On a Political Prisoner
9. The Leaders of the Crowd
10. Towards Break of Day
11. Demon and Beast
12. The Second Coming
13. A Prayer for My Daughter
14. A Meditation in Time of War
15. To be Carved on a Stone at Thoor Ballylee

== See also ==
- 1921 in poetry
- 1921 in literature
- Thoor Ballylee
