= The Second Coming (poem) =

1919 poem by Irish poet W. B. Yeats

- by W. B. Yeats
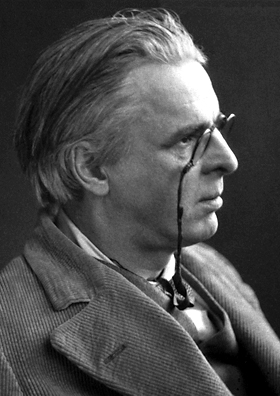
- W.B. Yeats in 1923
- Written: 1919
- First published in: The Dial
- Country: Ireland
- Language: English
- Form: Lyric poetry
- Publication date: 1920
- Media type: Print
- Lines: 22

Full text
- The Second Coming (Yeats) at Wikisource

"The Second Coming" is a poem written by Irish poet William Butler Yeats in 1919, first printed in The Dial in November 1920 and included in his 1921 collection of verses Michael Robartes and the Dancer. The poem uses Christian imagery regarding the Apocalypse and Second Coming to describe allegorically the atmosphere of post-war Europe. It is considered a canonical work of modernist poetry and has been reprinted in several collections, including The Norton Anthology of Modern Poetry.

== Background ==
The poem was written in 1919 in the aftermath of the First World War and the beginning of the Irish War of Independence in January 1919, which followed the Easter Rising in April 1916, and before the British government had decided to send in the Black and Tans to Ireland. This period also saw the 1918–1919 flu pandemic, which Yeats' pregnant wife, Georgie, contracted in the weeks preceding the authorship of "The Second Coming". The highest death rates of the pandemic were among pregnant women, who in some areas had a mortality rate of up to 70%, but Georgie survived. Yeats wrote the poem while his wife was convalescing. Yeats's cosmology is laid out in his book A Vision, where he explained his views on history and how it informed his poetry. Yeats saw human history as a series of epochs, what he called "gyres". Each of these eras began and ended with a gyration of spiritual forces, which he described as follows in A Vision:

A line is a symbol of time, and expresses a movement, symbolising the emotional subjective mind without extension in space; a plane, cutting the line at right angles, is spatial, the symbol of objectivity and intellect. A gyre is a combination of line and plane, and as one tendency or the other must always be stronger, the gyre is always expanding or contracting. The gyre is drawn as a cone which represents sometimes the individual soul and its history, sometimes general life. For this cone two cones are substituted since neither the soul of man or nature can be expressed without conflict.

This system of gyres, consequently, was fundamentally a system rooted in conflict between a society's tendencies and a distinct set of principles: every two millennia, one gyre widens and the other narrows to reach a point of crisis, whereupon a new system and civilization is born. Yeats used the phrase "the second birth" instead of "the Second Coming" in his first drafts, reflecting this idea of a new moral order being born from a time of crisis. To Yeats, one of these gyres, represented by Greco-Roman society, had been replaced by Christianity's set of values, but a reversion to the moral principles of Greek and Roman society was inevitable at the inflection point of the 20th century. For example, in "His Memories", one of Yeats' later poems, Yeats equates Maud Gonne, a woman he believed represented the apocalyptic moral turning point of the era, to Helen of Troy, to whom he attributed the death of Hector and destruction of Troy. Yeats deeply admired and frequently discussed the philosophy of Friedrich Nietzsche, who described this reversal of the moral order due to Christianity in works such as On the Genealogy of Morality. The First World War and the beginning of war in Ireland only heightened these attitudes that the world was at an apocalyptic crisis point, where the world's moral order would be reversed.

== Poem ==
The Second Coming
Recitation

The Second Coming

Turning and turning in the widening gyre
The falcon cannot hear the falconer;
Things fall apart; the centre cannot hold;
Mere anarchy is loosed upon the world,
The blood-dimmed tide is loosed, and everywhere
The ceremony of innocence is drowned;
The best lack all conviction, while the worst
Are full of passionate intensity.

Surely some revelation is at hand;
Surely the Second Coming is at hand.
The Second Coming! Hardly are those words out
When a vast image out of Spiritus Mundi
Troubles my sight: somewhere in sands of the desert
A shape with lion body and the head of a man,
A gaze blank and pitiless as the sun,
Is moving its slow thighs, while all about it
Reel shadows of the indignant desert birds.
The darkness drops again; but now I know
That twenty centuries of stony sleep
Were vexed to nightmare by a rocking cradle,
And what rough beast, its hour come round at last,
Slouches towards Bethlehem to be born?

The poem is split into two stanzas with different focuses: the first focuses on the present breakdown of the world order, while the second describes the society and moral order which will emerge from this apocalyptic situation. This reflects Yeats' philosophy of the nature of gyres: as one society descends into incoherent chaos, another set of morals reflective of a more violent, heartless epoch will arise.

The first stanza immediately introduces Yeats' concept of the gyre, introducing the world's setting as one which is "turning and turning" in the gyre as it widens to the point of apocalypse. The image of a falconer unable to call back his falcon is invoked in reference to this state, demonstrating helplessness and inability for individuals to control or stop the inevitable conclusion of the world's moral reversal. The narrator then describes a variety of brutal images: the unleashing of anarchy, a "blood-dimmed tide", the loss of innocence, and a circumstance where the good in society fail to act while the wicked are emboldened; in summary, a circumstance where societal norms and institutions are in the process of collapse. The repetition of the term "loosed" serves to restate the widening, or loosening, of the gyre, calling back to the ultimate cause of these events.

The second stanza, rather than acting as a series of disconnected images as the first does, operates as a single prophetic vision. The narrator exclaims that the Second Coming, an apocalyptic event described in Revelation, must be at hand, before receiving a vision from "Spiritus Mundi", or the "World Soul". This image concerns a sphinx in the desert, with a "blank and pitiless" expression. Meanwhile, the "indignant" desert birds circling the sphinx contrast with the falcon present at the beginning of the poem. The narrator then remarks that he is now aware that twenty centuries of sleep were "vexed to nightmare" by a rocking cradle, with the juxtaposition of the nightmare and cradle "insist[ing] that the source of terror was bred in the apparent peace of the culturally hypostatized infancy of Christ." The poem ends with a rhetorical question associating a "rough beast", whose birth is imminent, with Bethlehem, the birthplace of Jesus Christ.

== Critical engagement ==
In 2009, David A. Ross identified "The Second Coming" as "one of the most famous poems in the English language", echoing Harold Bloom who, in 1986, cited the piece as "one of the most universally admired poems of our century".

Critics agree that the poetry of Percy Bysshe Shelley had a strong influence on the drafting of "The Second Coming". The first stanza matches the tone, diction, and syntax of Prometheus Unbound. Both Harold Bloom and Jon Stallworthy speculate that the poem's sphinx draws on the imagery of Shelley's "Ozymandias".

"The Second Coming" has often been analyzed by critics as a depiction of breakdowns of political authority and political legitimacy. These scholars argue that the depictions in the first stanza of anarchy being released upon the world depict the destruction of the traditionally understood political order, while the second envisions a growing power unrestrained by modern ethics. The line at the end of the first stanza, "the worst are full of passionate intensity", has received particular attention from these scholars, who believe this characterization envisions populism and a political activity centered around charisma.

Critics have also argued that "The Second Coming" describes what Yeats elsewhere called an "antithetical dispensation" to the age ushered in by the birth of Jesus Christ. Richard Ellmann understood the "rough beast" of the final lines as a creature to be born itself in Bethlehem, marking the cyclical (and violent) overturning of an age; furthermore, noting that "the final intimation that the new god will be born in Bethlehem, which Christianity associates with passive infancy and the tenderness of maternal love, makes the brutishness particularly frightful." Giorgio Melchiori identified this same idea in Yeats' other writings, noting that

(1) by 1896 Yeats had already some inkling of the cyclical theory of history which he was later to develop and expound in A Vision; (2) The Trojan War, the birth of Christ, and an indefinite event due to happen in our century were already considered by him as three fundamental crises in world history, each of which reverse the established order and ushered in a new cycle of civilization ...

== Influence ==
=== Titles ===
Phrases in the poem have been adopted as the title in a variety of media. The words "things fall apart" in the third line are alluded to by Chinua Achebe in his novel Things Fall Apart (1958), The Roots in their album Things Fall Apart (1999) (in reference to Achebe's novel), and Jon Ronson in his podcast series Things Fell Apart (2021).

Similarly, the words "the centre cannot hold" in the same line are used in the title of Elyn Saks' book about her experience with schizophrenia while obtaining her PhD at Oxford, and later her JD at Yale, The Center Cannot Hold: My Journey Through Madness (2008), Jonathan Alter's book on U.S. President Barack Obama's first term, The Center Holds (2013), the Netflix biographical documentary Joan Didion: The Center Will Not Hold (2017), Sleater-Kinney's album The Center Won't Hold (2019), and Junkie XL's song "The Center Will Not Hold, Twenty Centuries Of Stony Sleep" in the film Zack Snyder's Justice League (2021).

Additionally, the phrase "slouches towards Bethlehem" in the last line is referenced in the title of Joan Didion's collection of essays Slouching Towards Bethlehem (1968), Joni Mitchell's musical adaptation of the poem "Slouching Towards Bethlehem" (1991), Robert Bork's non-fiction work Slouching Towards Gomorrah (1996), Daniel Ravipinto and Star Foster's interactive fiction game Slouching Towards Bedlam (2003), and Brad DeLong's economic history Slouching Towards Utopia (2022).

Other works whose titles come from lines in the poem includes Walker Percy’s novel The Second Coming (1980), Robert B. Parker's novel The Widening Gyre (1983), Amos Elon's essay collection A Blood-Dimmed Tide (1997), and multiple songs in Moby's album Everything Was Beautiful, and Nothing Hurt (2018).

In 2018, James Griffiths composed an orchestral musical setting, “The Second Coming W.B. Yeats”, commissioned and narrated by Bass-Baritone, Odekhiren Amaize and accompanied by a children’s chorus.

=== Quotes ===
The poem is quoted extensively in several books, including Arthur M. Schlesinger Jr.'s political manifesto The Vital Center: The Politics of Freedom (1949), and Stephen King's novel The Stand (1978).

It is also quoted extensively in numerous films and TV shows, including the episode "Revelations" (1994) of Babylon 5, the director's cut of Nixon (1995), multiple episodes including "The Second Coming" (2007) of The Sopranos, the last episode of Devs (2020), the episode "The Queen's Speech" (2021) of See, and by Kenneth Clark in the final episode of his 1969 documentary series Civilisation.

The reference to the beast "[slouching] towards Bethlehem" in the poem's final line is quoted in the first verse of Irish singer-songwriter Andrew John Hozier-Byrne's track NFWMB.
