= Anne Yeats =

Irish painter (1919–2001)

- Born: 26 February 1919; Dublin, Ireland
- Died: 4 July 2001 (aged 82); Dublin, Ireland
- Education: Metropolitan School of Art
- Occupations: Artist, costume and stage designer
- Parents: W. B. Yeats (father); Georgie Hyde-Lees (mother)

Anne Butler Yeats (26 February 1919 – 4 July 2001) was an Irish painter, costume and stage designer.

== Early and family life ==
She was the daughter of the poet William Butler Yeats and Georgie Hyde-Lees, a niece of the painter Jack Butler Yeats, and of Lily Yeats and of Elizabeth Corbet Yeats. Her aunts were associated with the arts and crafts movement in Ireland and were associated with the Dun Emer Press, Cuala Press, and Dun Emer industries. Her brother Michael Yeats was a politician. She was known as "feathers" by her family.

Born in Dublin on 26 February 1919, her birth was commemorated by her father with the poem A Prayer for My Daughter. Anne Yeats spent her first 3 years between Ballylee, County Galway, and Oxford before her family moved to 82 Merrion Square, Dublin in 1922.

She attended St. Margaret's Hall, 50 Mespil Rd, and Nightingale Hall, Morehampton Rd Dublin. After suffering from ill health, she went to the Pension Henriette, a boarding school in Villars-sur-Bex, Switzerland from 1928 to 1930. In 1923 her Aunt Elizabeth "Lolly" gave her brush drawing lessons which aided her in winning first prize in the RDS National Art competition for children under eight years old in 1925 and 1926.

== Theatre work ==
She trained in the Royal Hibernian Academy school from 1933 to 1936, and worked as a stage designer with the Abbey Theatre in Dublin. At the age of 16, she was hired by the Abbey Theatre in 1936 as an assistant to Tanya Moiseiwitsch. She studied for four months at the School of Theatrical Design in Paris with Paul Colin in 1937. At 18, she began her costume career on sets with Ria Mooney's company. At the Abbey, she designed the sets and costumes for revivals of W.B. Yeats' plays The resurrection and On Baile's strand (1938).

In 1938 she designed the first production of W.B. Yeats' play Purgatory. The designs for Purgatory were her most successful achievement. "My daughter's designs for [Cuchulain] and Purgatory -especially Purgatory were greatly admired" quoted by W.B Yeats. Purgatory was the last play that W.B. Yeats saw on stage, and when it was performed it was a full house. When working on Purgatory, Hugh Hunt wanted to have a moon on the backcloth of the production but Anne Yeats refused. "If she does not win, she is going to say that she doesn't wish to have her name on the programme as a designer of the setting." This could be the main reason why her name is not on many productions that she had worked on. Anne Yeats also designed the first play of her uncle Jack Yeats to receive professional production, Harlequin's Positions.

In 1939 she was promoted to head of design at the Abbey until her departure in May 1941. In 1939 it was commented that her designs were "getting arty" and not in keeping with the style of the Abbey. One of her last designs was her father's last play, The Death of Cuchulain for the Lyric Theatre on the Abbey stage, in 1949. She designed and stage-managed for The Peacock, The Cork Opera House, The Olympia, The Gaiety Theatre, the Austin Clarke Lyric Theatre, the Abbey Theatre and Player's Theatre.

Among the work Yeats is credited within the Abbey Theatre, she is also recorded as having worked on 5 productions in the Peacock Theatre with the Theatre Company:

- Alarm Among the Clerks (1937)
- The Phoenix (1937)
- Harlequin's Positions (1939)
- The Wild Cat (1940)
- Cavaliero (The Life of a Hawk) (1948)

== Painting career ==
She chose to move towards painting full-time beginning a brief study at the Dublin Metropolitan School of Art in 1941. She experimented with watercolour and wax. She had a touching naive expressionist style and was interested in representing domestic humanity. She designed many of the covers for the books of Irish-language publisher Sáirséal agus Dill over a twenty-year period from 1958. She did illustrations for books by Denis Devlin, Thomas Kinsella and Louis MacNeice, and worked with many young designers, such as Louis LeBrocquy.

She revived the Cuala Press in 1969. In 1986, she donated documents concerning the Cuala Press to Trinity College Dublin.

== Legacy ==
The Royal Hibernian Academy held a retrospective of her work in 1995, as did the National Gallery of Ireland in 2002. She donated her collection of Jack B. Yeats' sketchbooks to the National Gallery of Ireland, leading to the creation of the Yeats Museum within the gallery. Her brother, Michael, in turn, donated her sketchbooks to the museum.

== Work in collections ==
- The National Gallery of Ireland, Dublin
- The Hugh Lane Municipal Gallery, Dublin
- The Ulster Museum, Belfast
- Trinity College, Dublin
- Model Arts and Niland Gallery, Sligo
- The Arts Council of Ireland
