= Sour Grapes (poetry collection) =

Book by William Carlos Williams

First edition

Sour Grapes: a book of poems is an early work by William Carlos Williams. Published in 1921, by The Four Seas Company in Boston, the collection includes poems such as "A Widow's Lament in Springtime", "The Great Figure", "Complaint", and "Queen-Ann's-Lace".

Williams was still struggling to find his audience at the time that he published Sour Grapes and he was forced to pay for some, if not all, of the publishing expenses himself. As a book, it is highly representative of Williams's early writing. The book is filled out with improvisational pieces that Williams seems to have thrown together in the spare moments that he stole from his medical practice. However, this poetic improvisation produced remarkable language, which is evident in "A Widow's Lament in Springtime" and "Complaint".

Like most of Williams' early works, Sour Grapes was ignored by most critics at the time, but it was well received by Kenneth Burke in The Dial in February 1922.
