= Easter, 1916 =

1916 poem by W. B. Yeats

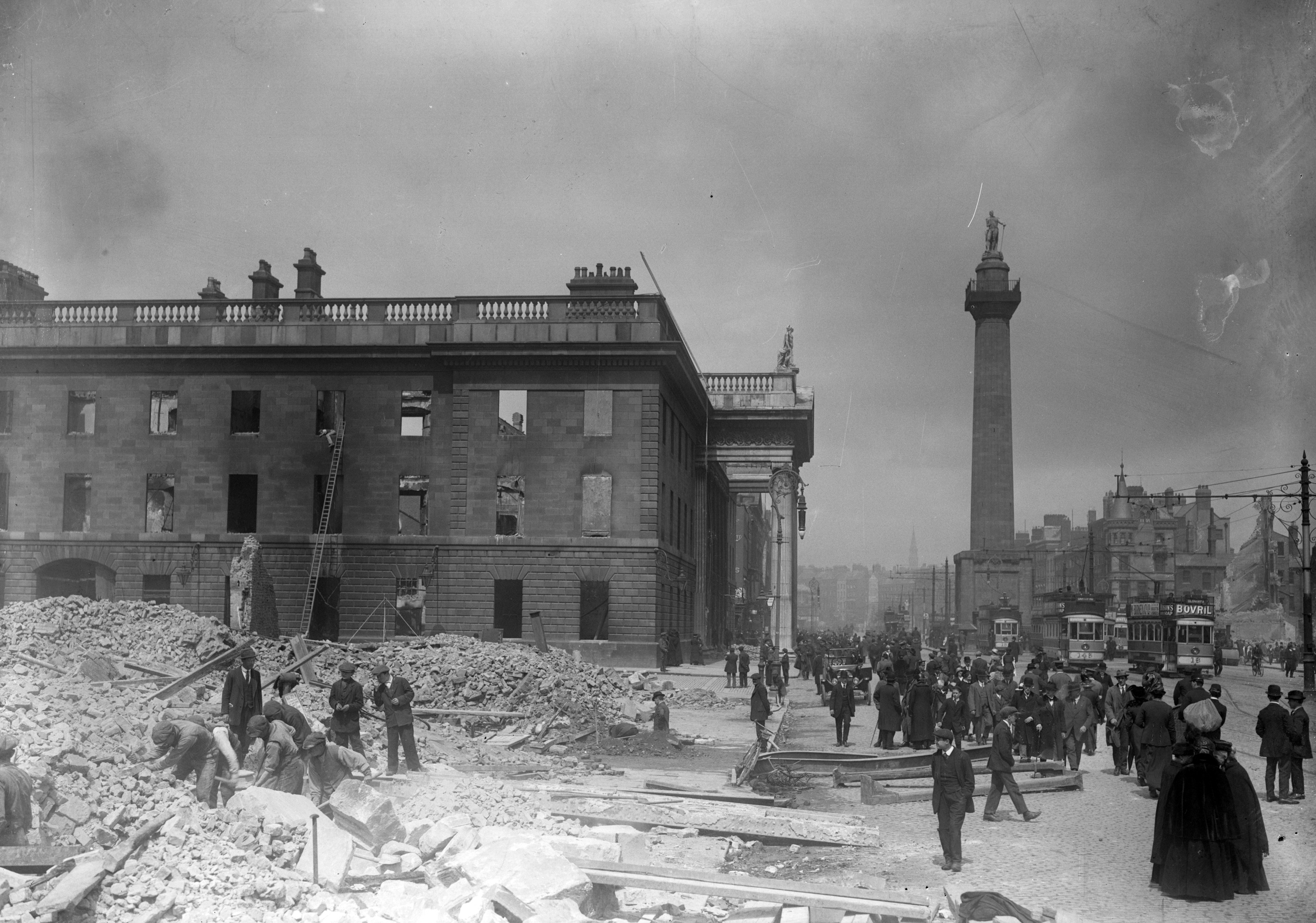
The ruined General Post Office after the Easter Rising, 1916.

Easter, 1916 is a poem by W. B. Yeats describing the poet's torn emotions regarding the events of the Easter Rising staged in Ireland against British rule on Easter Monday, April 24, 1916. The rebellion was unsuccessful, and sixteen of the Irish republican leaders involved were executed.

The poem was written between May and September 1916, with an initial issue of 25 copies which were printed privately. It was first published in 1921 in the collection Michael Robartes and the Dancer.

== Background ==
Even though a committed nationalist, Yeats usually rejected violence as a means to secure Irish independence, and as a result had strained relations with some of the figures who eventually led the uprising. The sudden and abrupt execution of the leaders of the revolutionaries, however, was as much a shock to Yeats as it was to ordinary Irish people at the time, who did not expect the events to take such a bad turn so soon. Yeats was working through his feelings about the revolutionary movement in this poem, and the insistent refrain that "a terrible beauty is born" turned out to be prescient, as the execution of the leaders of the Easter Rising had the opposite effect to that intended. The killings led to a reinvigoration of the Irish Republican movement rather than its demise.

== Composition ==
The initial social and ideological distance between Yeats and some of the revolutionary figures is portrayed in the poem when, in the first stanza, the poem's narrator admits to having exchanged only "polite meaningless words" (6) with the revolutionaries prior to the uprising, and had even indulged in "a mocking tale or gibe" (10) about their political ambitions. However, this attitude changes with the refrain at the end of the stanza, when Yeats moves from a feeling of separation between the narrator and the revolutionaries, to a mood of distinct unity, by including all subjects of the poem in the last line with reference to the utter change that happened when the revolutionary leaders were executed: "All changed, changed utterly: A terrible beauty is born." (15–16) These last lines of the stanza have rhythmic similarities to the popular ballads of the era as well as syntactic echoes of William Blake.

In the second stanza, the narrator proceeds to describe in greater detail the key figures involved in the Easter uprising, alluding to them without actually listing names. The female revolutionary described at the opening of the stanza is Countess Markievicz, who was well-known to Yeats and a long-time friend. The man who "kept a school/ And rode our winged horse" is a reference to Patrick Pearse, and the lines about Pearse's "helper and friend" allude to Thomas MacDonagh. In Yeats's description of the three, his torn feelings about the Easter uprising are most keenly communicated. He contrasts the "shrill" voice of Countess Markievicz as a revolutionary, with his remembrance of her incomparably "sweet" voice when she was a young woman; and he contrasts the haughty public persona of Pearse against his impression of his "sensitive" nature, describing how "daring and sweet" his ideals were even though he and MacDonagh had to resort to "force".

This stanza also shows how Yeats was able to separate his own private feelings towards some of the revolutionary figures from the greater nationalist cause that the group was pursuing. Whilst Yeats had positive regard for the three Republican leaders mentioned above, he despised Major John MacBride, who as the estranged husband of Maud Gonne (who in turn had been the object of Yeats's romantic feelings for a number of years) had been accused of abusing both Gonne and their daughter during their marriage, although never proven. In this poem, although MacBride is alluded to as a "vainglorious lout" (32) who had "done most bitter wrong" (33) to those close to the narrator's heart, Yeats includes him in his eulogy among those who have fallen for their republican ideals: "Yet I number him in the song;/ He, too, has resigned his part/ In the casual comedy/ He, too, has been changed in turn" (36–7). The phrase "the casual comedy" is laden with sarcasm, pointing to an unnecessary loss of life (a point he picks up again in a later stanza) as well as the senselessness of the killings. Yeats emphasises his repeated charge at the end of the stanza, that, as a result of the execution of the Easter Rising leaders, "A terrible beauty is born" (40).

The third stanza differs from the first two stanzas by abandoning the first-person narrative of "I" and moving to the natural realm of streams, clouds, and birds. The speaker elaborates on the theme of change ("Minute by minute they change (48) ... Changes minute by minute" (50)) and introduces the symbol of the stone, which opens and closes the stanza. Unlike the majority of images presented in this stanza, of clouds moving, seasons changing, horse-hoof sliding, which are characterized by their transience, the stone is a symbol of permanence. Yeats compares the fixedness of the revolutionaries' purpose to that of the stone; their hearts are said to be "enchanted to a stone" (43). The stone disturbs or "trouble[s]" "the living stream" (44), a metaphor for how the steadfastness of the revolutionaries' purpose contrasts with the fickleness of less dedicated people. The singularity of their purpose, leading to their ultimate deaths, cut through the complacency and indifference of everyday Irish society at the time.

The fourth and last stanza of the poem resumes the first person narrative of the first and second stanzas. The stanza returns to the image of the stony heart: "Too long a sacrifice/ Can make a stone of the heart" (57–8), Yeats wrote, putting the determined struggle of Irish republicans in the Easter Rising in the context of the long history of Irish revolts against British rule, as well as alluding to the immense psychological costs of the struggle for independence. Indeed, the narrator cries, "O when may it suffice?", and answering his own question with the line, "That is heaven's part" (making an allusion to Shakespeare's play Hamlet—the parallel line occurs in Act I, scene V, regarding Gertrude's guilt: "Against thy mother aught: leave her to heaven"). In Yeats's scheme, Heaven's role is to determine when the suffering will end and when the sacrifices are considered sufficient (59–60); whilst the role of the people left behind is to forever remember the names of those who had fallen in order to properly lay their wandering spirits to rest: "our part/ To murmur name upon name,/ as a mother names her child/ when sleep at last has come/ On limbs that had run wild." (60–3).

In the second half of the last stanza, the narrator wonders aloud whether the sacrifices were indeed warranted: "Was it needless death after all?" (67), contemplating the possibility that the British might still allow the Home Rule Act 1914 to come into force without the uprising. However, Yeats made the point that what's done was done. All that is important is to remember the revolutionaries' dream and carry on: "We know their dream; enough/ To know they dreamed and are dead." There is no point arguing over whether these revolutionaries should or shouldn't have acted so rashly for their cause as they did: "And what if excess of love/ bewildered them till they died?" These are some of the most poignant lines in the poem, with the phrase "excess of love" (72) recalling the character of Oisin in Yeats's long poem "The Wanderings of Oisin."

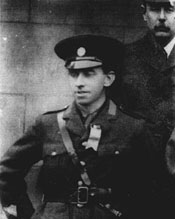
Thomas MacDonagh, mentioned in the poem's final stanza, was executed for his role in the Easter 1916 uprising

In the end, the narrator resigns to commemorating the names of those fallen revolutionary figures — Thomas MacDonagh, John MacBride, James Connolly and Patrick Pearse — as eternal heroes of the Irish Republican movement (symbolised by the colour green), with Yeats adapting the final refrain to reflect the price these people paid to change the course of Irish history:

I write it out in a verse—
MacDonagh and MacBride
And Connolly and Pearse
Now and in time to be,
Wherever green is worn,
Are changed, changed utterly:
A terrible beauty is born.

The extent to which Yeats was willing to eulogize the members of the Easter Rising can be seen in his usage of "green" (78) to commemorate said members above, even though he generally abhors the use of the colour green as a political symbol (Yeats's abhorrence was such that he forbade green as the color of the binding of his books). In commemorating the names of the revolutionaries in eloquent lamentation in the final stanza, including even his love rival Major John MacBride, Yeats reconciled his personal private sentiments towards some of the individuals involved with the larger nationalist sentiments upheld and championed by the poem, even if there were revolutionaries whose strategies he didn't fully agree with. Yeats has an interesting perspective on the historical significance of his poem, adding to the tension of his recording. The revolutionaries "now and in time to be (77)... are changed, changed utterly" (79)— the knowledge of which shows Yeats's astute insight into the historical importance of his poetic memorial of these revolutionary figures.

The date of the Easter Rising can be seen in the structure of the poem also: there are 16 lines (for 1916) in the first and third stanzas, 24 lines (for April 24, the date the Rising began) in the second and fourth stanzas, and four stanzas in total (which refers to April, the fourth month of the year).

== See also ==
- September 1, 1939
