= Devarakonda Balagangadhara Tilak =

Indian poet, novelist

- Born: 1 August 1921
- Died: 30 June 1966 (aged 44)
- Occupations: Poet, novelist, short story writer

Devarakonda Balagangadhara Tilak (1 August 1921 – 1 July 1966) was an Indian poet, novelist and short story writer.

== Early life ==
Tilak was born on 1 August 1921 in the village of Mandapaka in the Tanuku Taluk district.

He completed his Intermediate at AVN College Visakhapatnam and joined Loyola College, Chennai (then Madras), but had to cease his studies due to health issues. He established the Vigjnana Parishad in Tanuku (later renamed Sahiti Sarovaram) and pursued literary activities.

Tilak wrote his first story at the age of 11, which is said to have been published in the Madhuri Magazine. At the age of 16, he started writing poetry and developed his unique writing style.

His most famous work, Amrutham Kurisina Ratri, was translated into English as The Night the Nectar Rained by Velchala Kondal Rao. The Night of Nectar was translated by B Indira.

He died on 1 July 1966 at the age of 44 years.

== Career ==
His first anthology, Prabhatamu-Sandhya (1945), was written in the romantic style popular in Indian poetry of the early and mid-20th century. He changed his style after attending the 'All India Progressive Writers' Conference in Bombay. His anthology of Poems ( Padya kavitalu) "Goruvankalu" was published by Visalandhra Publishing house.

== Literary contributions and recognition ==
He was awarded the "Sahitya Academy award" in 1970 for his posthumously published collection of poems Amrutham Kurisina Ratri. published in 1969 The volume was called a "milestone in modern Telugu" by Sisir Kumar Das, who added, "But for him, 'verse libre' or 'prose poetry' could not have gained so much of popularity."

His short stories include "Sundari-SubbaRavu", "Vuri Chivara Illu" and "Tilak Kadhalu". His stories were influenced by Maxim Gorky and Rabindranath Tagore.

== Sources ==
- "Anaganaga Omanchikatha" (PDF). February 2008.
