= The Tower (poetry collection) =

Collection of poetry by W. B. Yeats

The Tower is a book of poems by W. B. Yeats, published in 1928. The Tower was Yeats's first major collection as Nobel Laureate after receiving the Nobel Prize in 1923. It is considered to be one of the poet's most influential volumes and was well received by the public.

The title, which the book shares with the second poem, refers to Ballylee Castle, a Norman tower which Yeats purchased and restored in 1917. Yeats Gaelicized the name to Thoor Ballylee, and it has retained the title to this day. Yeats often summered at Thoor Ballylee with his family until 1928.

The book includes several of Yeats' most famous poems, including "Sailing to Byzantium," "Leda and the Swan," and "Among School Children."

The book entered the public domain in the United States in 2024.

== Previous publication of select poems ==
All of the poems included in The Tower had previously appeared elsewhere in print collections and periodicals. Many of the poems featured in Seven Poems and a Fragment, The Cat and the Moon and Certain Poems, and October Blast released by Cuala Press. Other poems had been collected in A Vision.

== Cover design ==
Yeats commissioned Thomas Sturge Moore to create the cover for the volume in 1927. The gold wood-cut style image depicts Thoor Ballylee and its reflection in waters below the tower all on a light green background. The poet praised Moore's artwork, noting that the cover was both a true representation of Thoor Ballylee and a successful symbolic design for the collection. Moore's work on The Tower and other collections solidified Yeats's modern image in both American and English print editions

== Literary topics and content ==
Many of the poems in The Tower demonstrate Yeats's disillusionment with the limitations of the physical world and his withdrawal from ordinary life. The poet seeks to transcend the conflicts between the dichotomies of mind/body and thought/action by allowing poetry to exist in the world of vision rather than the world of reality.

== Contents ==
1. "Sailing to Byzantium"
2. "The Tower"
3. "Meditations in Time of Civil War"
4. "Nineteen Hundred and Nineteen"
5. "The Wheel"
6. "Youth and Age"
7. "The New Faces"
8. "A Prayer for My Son"
9. "Two Songs from a Play"
10. "Fragments"
11. "Leda and the Swan"
12. "On a Picture of a Black Centaur by Edmund Dulac"
13. "Among School Children"
14. "Colonus' Praise"
15. "Wisdom"
16. "The Fool by the Roadside"
17. "Owen Aherne and His Dancers"
18. "A Man Young and Old"
19. "The Three Monuments"
20. "All Souls' Night"
21. "The Gift of Harun Al-Rashid"
