= A Vision =

1925 book by Yeats

- Title page for A Vision (1938 edition)
- Author: William Butler Yeats
- Original title: A Vision: An Explanation of Life Founded upon the Writings of Giraldus and upon Certain Doctrines Attributed to Kusta Ben Luka
- Language: English
- Subject: Astrology
- Published: 1925
- Publisher: T. Werner Laurie
- Publication place: England
- Pages: 256
- OCLC: 3596904

A Vision: An Explanation of Life Founded upon the Writings of Giraldus and upon Certain Doctrines Attributed to Kusta Ben Luka, privately published in 1925, is a book-length study of various philosophical, historical, astrological, and poetic topics by the Irish poet William Butler Yeats. Yeats wrote this work while experimenting with automatic writing alongside his wife Georgie Hyde-Lees. It serves as a meditation on the relationships between imagination, history, and the occult. A Vision has been compared to Eureka: A Prose Poem, the final major work of Edgar Allan Poe.

Yeats published a second edition with alterations in 1937.

== Bibliography ==
- Yeats, W. B., A Vision: The Original 1925 Version, ed. Catherine E. Paul and Margaret Mills Harper, Collected Works of W. B. Yeats, Volume XIII. New York: Scribner, 2008. ISBN 978-0-684-80733-1
- Yeats, W. B., A Vision: The Revised 1937 Version, ed. Catherine E. Paul and Margaret Mills Harper, Collected Works of W. B. Yeats, Volume XIV. New York: Scribner, 2015. ISBN 978-0-684-80734-8
- Makransky, Bob, The Great Wheel - a commentary on W.B. Yeats' "A Vision". Dear Brutus Press, 2017.
- Mann, Neil, A Reader's Guide to Yeats's "A Vision". Clemson, SC: Clemson University Press, 2019. ISBN 978-1-942954-62-0
- Mann, Neil, Matthew Gibson, Claire Nally, Yeats's "A Vision": Explications and Contexts. Clemson, SC: Clemson University Press, 2012. ISBN 978-0-9835339-2-4
- Raine, Kathleen, From Blake to "A Vision". Dublin : Dolmen Press, 1979. ISBN 0-85105-339-4
- Raine, Kathleen, Yeats the initiate : essays on certain themes in the work of W.B. Yeats, Mountrath, Ireland : Dolmen Press; London : G. Allen & Unwin, 1986. ISBN 0-85105-398-X. Cf. Chapter VI, "From Blake to A Vision", pp. 106–176.
