= Bertha Georgie Yeats =

Wife of W. B. Yeats (1892–1968)

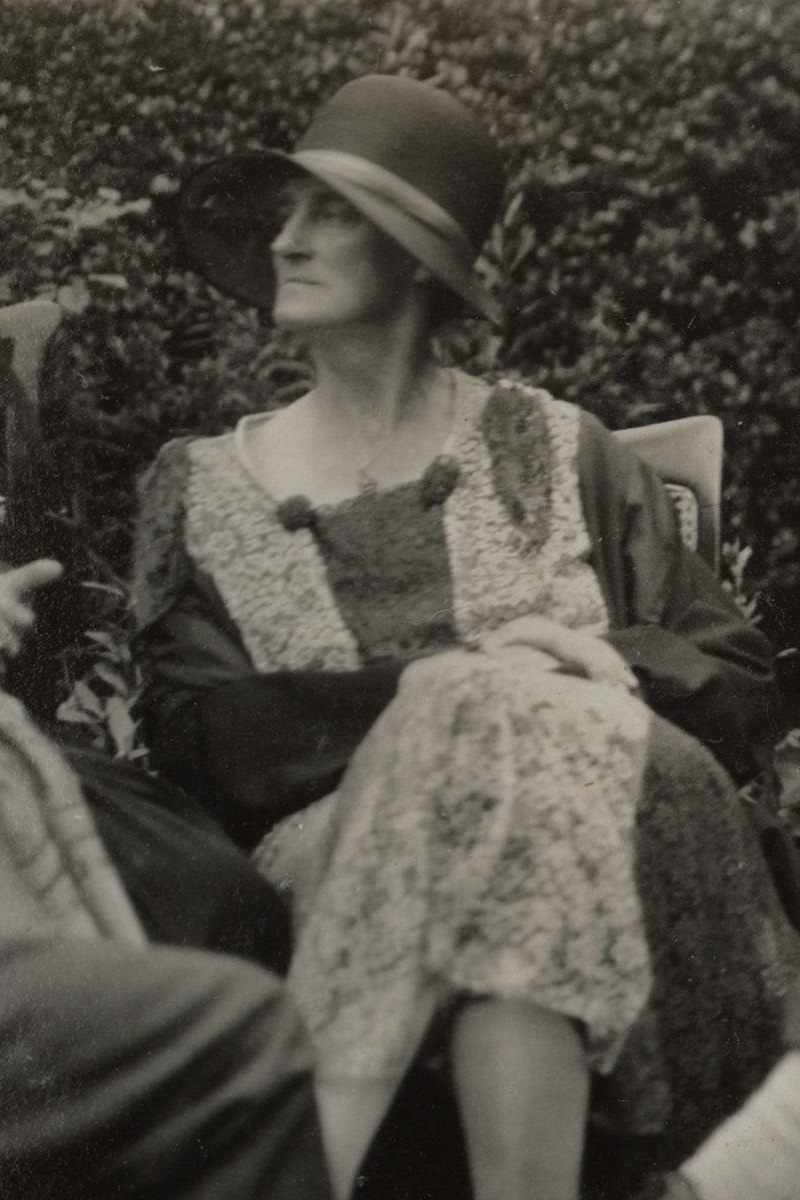
- Yeats in 1930
- Born: Bertha Georgie Hyde-Lees; 16 October 1892; Fleet, Hampshire, England
- Died: 23 August 1968 (aged 75); Dublin, Ireland
- Spouse: W. B. Yeats (m. 1917; died 1939)
- Children: Anne; Michael

Bertha Georgie Yeats (née Hyde-Lees; 16 October 1892 – 23 August 1968) was the wife of the poet William Butler Yeats.

== Early life ==
Daughter of militia captain (William) Gilbert Hyde-Lees (1865–1909), of the Manchester Regiment, and Edith Ellen (1868–1942) known as "Nelly", daughter of barrister and manufacturer Montagu Woodmass, JP, Georgie was born in Fleet, Hampshire on 16 October 1892. Her father was regarded by her mother's family as "a most undesirable character, but 'rolling in money'", having taken up the life of a "gentleman alcoholic" on resigning his commission after receiving an inheritance from his wealthy uncle Harold Lees, of Pickhill Hall, near Wrexham, then part of Denbighshire; he was "attractive, reckless, witty, and... musical", and fond of pranks. She had an elder brother, Harold (1890–1963), who became a clergyman, with "rigid moral standards" and "a less than joyous existence", his only indulgence being "a fine collection of drawings and etchings". When she was only a few years old her parents' marriage failed due to her father's alcoholism. He had enough income to support his family, allowing Georgie and her mother to spend "a good deal of their time" travelling in Europe, but his wife was in the awkward social position of being a "married woman without a husband". The family lived a vaguely bohemian and nomadic lifestyle, travelling frequently to country homes and spending long periods visiting relatives.

She attended a number of schools in Knightsbridge, London art schools, studied languages and classics, and piano. She became close friends with Dorothy Shakespear, who was fond of Georgie and shared many of her interests despite being six years her senior. After the death of her father in 1909 at the age of 44, Georgie's mother married Dorothy's uncle, Henry Tucker, Olivia Shakespear's brother, and they moved to Kensington.

== W. B. Yeats ==
Her mother often brought young musicians and artists she had recently met to Olivia Shakespear's salon, many of whom became well-known modernists, including Ezra Pound, Walter Rummel, and Frederic Manning. Georgie continued to make the rounds of country estates with her mother and Olivia and Dorothy Shakespear. It was in their company in 1910 or 1911, as a seventeen-year-old, that one morning she met Yeats at the British Museum and again that afternoon during tea at the Shakespears.

Seven years later, when she was 25 and he was 52, Yeats asked Georgie to marry him. Only a few weeks earlier Iseult Gonne, the daughter of Maud Gonne whom Yeats had loved for many years, had rejected Yeats' marriage proposal. Georgie and Yeats married just three weeks later, on 20 October 1917, in a public register office, witnessed by her mother and Ezra Pound. During the honeymoon, while Yeats was still brooding about Iseult's rejection, Georgie began the automatic writing which fascinated him. Yeats wrote about her psychography days later in what was to be A Vision, and it held the marriage together for many years. Within a year of marriage, Yeats declared her name of Georgie to be insufferable and henceforth called her George.

== Personal life ==
The couple had two children, Anne and Michael. Georgie died on 23 August 1968.

== Sources ==
- Foster, R.F. W.B Yeats: A Life. Oxford University Press, 1997. ISBN 0-19-211735-1
- Saddlemeyer, Ann. "George Hyde-Lees: More than a Poet's Wife". in Norman Jeffares Yeats the European. Barnes and Noble Books, 1989. ISBN 0-389-20875-2
