= 1868 in poetry =

List of years in poetry	(table)
- … 1858; 1859; 1860; 1861; 1862; 1863; 1864; 1865; 1866; 1867; 1868; 1869; 1870; 1871; 1872; 1873; 1874; 1875; 1876; 1877; 1878 …
- In literature 1865 1866 1867 1868 1869 1870 1871
- Art; Archaeology; Architecture; Literature; Music; Philosophy; Science; +...

Nationality words link to articles with information on the nation's poetry or literature (for instance, Irish or France).

== Events ==
- Frederick James Furnivall founds the Chaucer Society

== Works published ==
=== Canada ===
- James Anderson. Sawney's Letters, or Cariboo Rhymes.
- Charles Mair, Dreamland and Other Poems, Canada

=== United Kingdom ===
- William Barnes, Poems of Rural Life in Common English
- Robert Browning:
  - Poetical Works, six volumes
  - The Ring and the Book, Volumes 1 and 2 this year; a total of 12 books and over 21,000 lines published this year and in 1869
- George Eliot (pen name of Mary Ann Evans), The Spanish Gypsy
- William Morris, The Earthly Paradise, Parts 1 and 2 (Part 3 1869 [although dated 1870], Part 4 1870; complete work in 10 volumes 1872)
- Richard Lewis Nettleship, City of Pygmies (in Greek) (awarded Gaisford Prize for Greek Verse, 1868)
- Menella Bute Smedley and Fanny Hart, published anonymously "By two friends", Poems Written for a Child
- Algernon Charles Swinburne, Siena

=== United States ===
- Benjamin Paul Blood, The Colonnades
- Phoebe Cary, Poems of Faith, Hope, and Love
- Adah Isaacs Menken, Infelicia
- Joaquin Miller, Specimens
- John Rollin Ridge, Poems
- Edward Rowland Sill, The Hermitage and Other Poems
- William Wetmore Story, Graffiti d'Italia

=== Other ===
- Charles Baudelaire, Curiosités esthétiques, posthumously published, France
- Comte de Lautréamont, pen name of Isidore Lucien Ducasse, first "chant" of Les Chants de Maldoror, a set of prose poems full of Gothic horror (reprinted in a book of miscellaneous poems, Parfums de l'áme 1869; first published in full in 1874); France

== Births ==
Death years link to the corresponding "[year] in poetry" article:

- January 10 – Ozaki Kōyō 尾崎 紅葉, pen name of Ozaki Tokutaro 尾崎 徳太郎 (died 1903), novelist, essayist and haiku poet (surname: Ozaki)
- May 14 – Mary Eliza Fullerton (died 1946), Australian
- August 6 - Paul Claudel (died 1955), French
- August 23 – Edgar Lee Masters (died 1950), American poet, biographer, dramatist and lawyer
- October 29 – Robert Crawford (died 1930), Australian
- December 25 – Ahmed Shawqi أحمد شوقي (died 1932), Egyptian poet and playwright
- December 29 – Kitamura Tokoku 北村透谷, pen-name of Kitamura Montaro (died 1894), Japanese, late Meiji period poet, essayist and a founder of the modern Japanese romantic literary movement (surname: Kitamura)
- Also:
  - Mohammed Abdullah Hassan (died 1920), poet and leader of the Dervish movement
  - Kavi Kant (died 1923), Indian, Gujarati-language writer and poet, writer of khandakavyas (narrative poems) and ghazals
  - K. C. Kesava Pillai (died 1914), Indian, Malayalam-language musician and poet

== Deaths ==
Birth years link to the corresponding "[year] in poetry" article:

- March 29 – Susanna Hawkins (born 1787), Scottish
- April 26 – James Lionel Michael (born 1824), Australian
- June 10 – Charles Harpur (born 1813), Australian
- August 10 – Adah Isaacs Menken (born 1835), American actress, painter and poet
- September 11 – Maria James (born 1793), American poet and domestic servant
- October 13 – Tachibana Akemi, 橘曙覧 (born 1812), Japanese poet and classical scholar (surname: Tachibana)

== See also ==
- 19th century in poetry
- 19th century in literature
- List of years in poetry
- List of years in literature
- Victorian literature
- French literature of the 19th century
- Poetry
