= 1894 in poetry =

This article covers 1894 in poetry. Nationality words link to articles with information on the nation's poetry or literature (for instance, Irish or France).

== Events ==
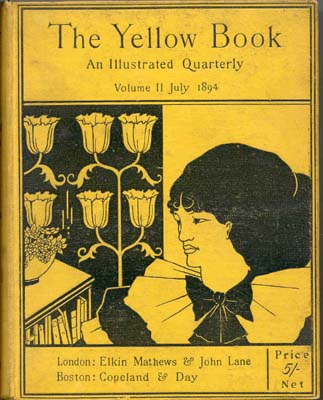
The Yellow Book, with a cover illustrated by Aubrey Beardsley.

- April — The Yellow Book first published (continues to 1897).
- June 22 — Nina Davis' first published translation from medieval Hebrew poetry into English, of Abraham ibn Ezra's The Song of Chess, appears in The Jewish Chronicle.
- November 8 — Robert Frost's poem "My Butterfly" is published on this date in the New York Independent, marking the first sale of his poetry. He earns $15.
- December 22 — Claude Debussy's symphonic poem Prélude à l'après-midi d'un faune, a free interpretation of Stéphane Mallarmé's 1876 poem, "L'après-midi d'un faune", is premièred in Paris.

== Works published in English ==
=== Canada ===
- Bliss Carman and Richard Hovey (an American), Songs from Vagabondia
- Frederick George Scott, My Lattice and Other Poems
- Arthur Stringer, Watchers of Twilight, and Other Poems

=== United Kingdom ===
- Laurence Binyon, Lyric Poems
- Robert Browning, Asolando
- Bliss Carman (Canadian) and Richard Hovey (American), Songs from Vagabondia
- John Davidson, Ballads and Songs, including "Thirty Bob a Week"
- Edmund Gosse, In Russet and Silver
- Selwyn Image, Poems and Carols
- Rudyard Kipling, "McAndrew's Hymn", first published in U.S.A.
- Robert Fuller Murray, Robert F. Murray: His Poems with a Memoir (posthumous, edited by Andrew Lang)
- AE, pen name of George William Russell, Homeward
- Algernon Charles Swinburne, Astrophel and Other Poems
- Katharine Tynan, Cuckoo Songs
- William Watson, Odes and Other Poems
- Oscar Wilde, The Sphinx
- W. B. Yeats, Irish poet published in the United Kingdom, The Land of Heart's Desire

=== United States ===
- Bliss Carman, Songs from Vagabondia, with Richard Hovey, a Canadian author published in the United States
- Ina Coolbrith, The Singer of the Sea
- Benjamin Franklin King Jr., Ben King's Verse (posthumous; 2nd edition 1898)
- George Santayana, Sonnets and Other Verses
- John B. Tabb, Poems

=== Other in English ===
- Henry Lawson, Short Stories in Prose and Verse, Australia
- Kerala Varma Valiya Koil Thampuran, Mayura Sandesam, a sandesa kavya ("message poem") written on the model of Kalidasa's Meghaduta, India, Sanskrit
- W. B. Yeats, Irish poet published in the United Kingdom, The Land of Heart's Desire

== Works published in other languages ==
- Francis Jammes, Vers, (also 1892 and 1893); France
- Henry Alfred Krishnapillai, Rakshanya Yatrikam ("The journey of salvation"), India, Tamil language
- Pierre Louÿs, Les Chansons de Bilitis ("The Songs of Bilitis"), erotic prose poems; Paris
- Tekkan Yosano, Bokoku no on ("Obligation to the Fatherland"), a collection of literary criticism, Japan

== Births ==
Death years link to the corresponding "[year] in poetry" article:

- January 2 – Robert Nathan (died 1985), American poet and novelist
- January 10 – Bochō Yamamura 山村 暮鳥 (died 1924), Japanese vagabond Christian preacher who gains attention as a writer of tales and songs for children and as a poet
- May 21 – Eileen Duggan (died 1972), New Zealand
- May 28 – Loa Ho (died 1943), Taiwan
- June 14 – W. W. E. Ross (died 1966), Canadian geophysicist and Imagist poet
- June 16 – Ogiwara Seisensui 荻原井泉水, pen name of Ogiwara Tōkichi (died 1976), Japanese haiku poet in the Taishō and Shōwa periods (surname: Ogiwara)
- August 31 – Charles Reznikoff, American poet, part of the Objectivist poetry movement
- October 4 – Jun Tsuji 辻 潤 (died 1944), Japanese author, poet, essayist, musician and bohemian (surname: Tsuji)
- October 7 – Doris Huestis Speirs (died 1989), Canadian painter, ornithologist and poet
- October 14 – E. E. Cummings (died 1962), American poet and painter
- October 18 – H. L. Davis (died 1960), American fiction writer and poet
- October 22 – Paul Grano (died 1975), Australian poet and journalist
- December 26 – Jean Toomer, American poet and novelist, part of the Harlem Renaissance
- Zahida Khatun Sherwani, writing as Zay Khay Sheen (died 1922), Indian Urdu language woman poet

== Deaths ==
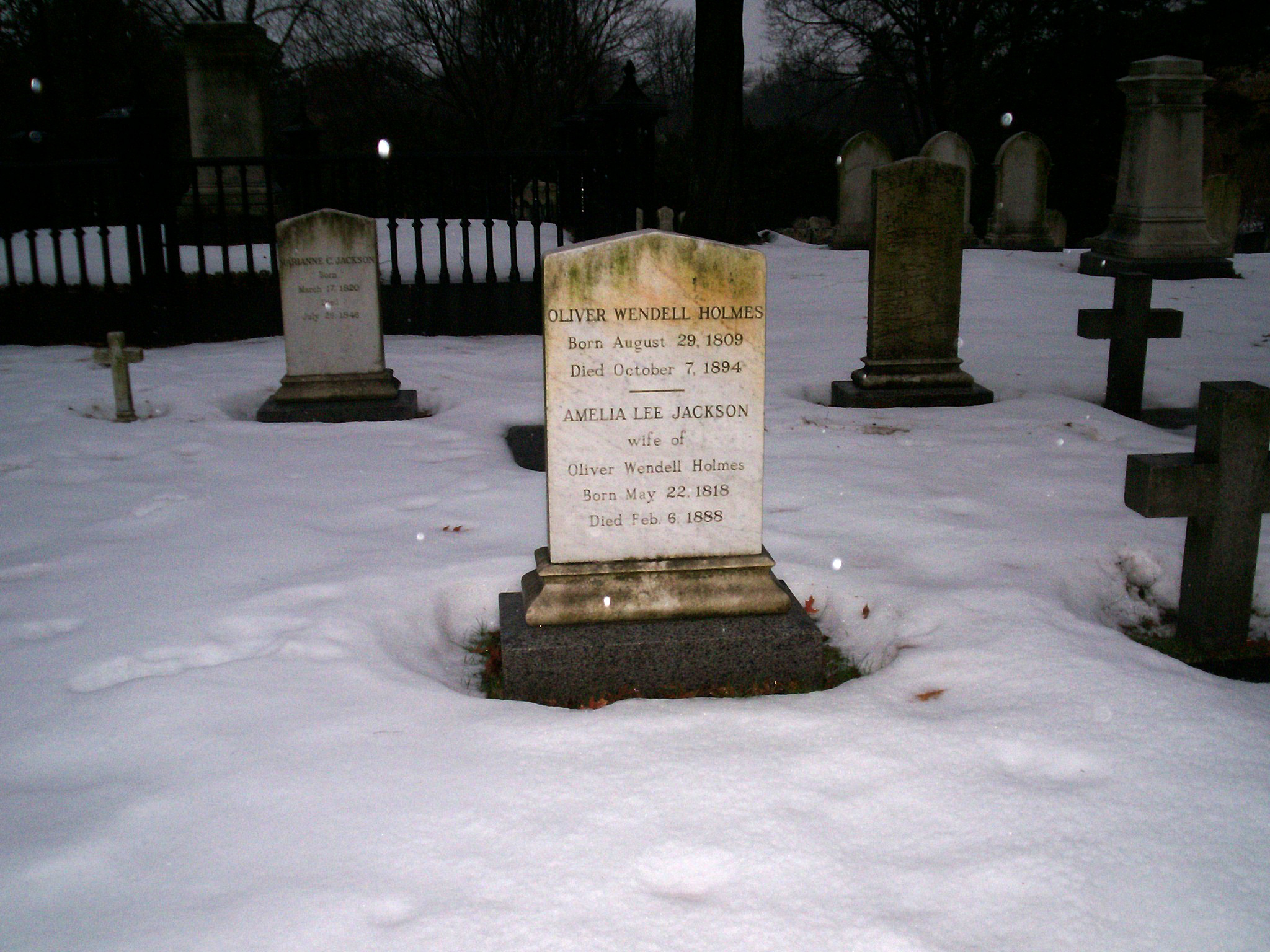
Grave of Oliver Wendell Holmes Sr. at Mount Auburn Cemetery in Cambridge, Massachusetts.

Birth years link to the corresponding "[year] in poetry" article:

- January 24 – Constance Fenimore Woolson (born 1840), American novelist, short-story writer and poet; a grandniece of James Fenimore Cooper
- April 7 – Benjamin Franklin King Jr. (born 1857), American poet and humorist
- April 18 – Bankim Chandra Chattopadhyay (born 1838), Bengali poet, novelist, essayist and journalist
- May 16 – Kitamura Tokoku 北村透谷, pen-name of Kitamura Montaro (born 1868), Japanese, late Meiji period poet, essayist and a founder of the modern Japanese romantic literary movement (surname: Kitamura)
- May 26 – Roden Noel (born 1834), English poet
- July 5 – Betty Paoli (born 1815), Austrian poet
- July 17 – Charles Marie René Leconte de Lisle (born 1818), French poet of the Parnassian movement
- August 25 – Celia Thaxter (born 1835), American poet and story writer
- September 5 – Augusta Webster (born 1837), English poet
- October 7 – Oliver Wendell Holmes (born 1809), American physician, professor and poet
- October 28 – John Askham (born 1825), English shoemaker and poet
- December 3 – Robert Louis Stevenson (born 1850), Scottish novelist, poet, essayist and travel writer, of a brain haemorrhage, in Samoa
- December 29 – Christina Rossetti (born 1830), English poet, of cancer
- Also:
  - Robert Fuller Murray (born 1863), American-born Scottish poet, of consumption
  - Perunnelli Krishnan Vaidyar (born 1863), Indian, Malayalam-language poet

== See also ==
- 19th century in poetry
- 19th century in literature
- List of years in poetry
- List of years in literature
- Victorian literature
- French literature of the 19th century
- Symbolist poetry
- Young Poland (Młoda Polska) a modernist period in Polish arts and literature, roughly from 1890 to 1918
- Poetry
