= 1859 in poetry =

List of years in poetry	(table)
- … 1849; 1850; 1851; 1852; 1853; 1854; 1855; 1856; 1857; 1858; 1859; 1860; 1861; 1862; 1863; 1864; 1865; 1866; 1867; 1868; 1869 …
- In literature 1856 1857 1858 1859 1860 1861 1862
- Art; Archaeology; Architecture; Literature; Music; Philosophy; Science; +...

Nationality words link to articles with information on the nation's poetry or literature (for instance, Irish or France).

== Events ==
- May – Antoni de Bofarull and Víctor Balaguer re-establish the Barcelona Floral Games (jocs florals), contests for Catalan Renaixença poetry.
- The first translation of Adam Mickiewicz's Polish epic poem Pan Tadeusz (1834) into a different language, Belarusian, is made by Belarusian writer and dramatist Vintsent Dunin-Martsinkyevich, in Vilnius but because of pressure from the authorities of the ruling Russian Empire he is able to publish only the first two chapters of the poem.

== Works published in English ==
=== United Kingdom ===
- William Barnes:
  - Hwomely Rhymes (see also 1844, 1862, 1868)
  - The Song of Solomon in the Dorset Dialect
- Edmund Fitzgerald, The Rubáiyát of Omar Khayyám (revised in 1868, 1872, 1879 [with the Salaman and Absal of Jami — see 1856])
- Louisa Shore and Arabella Shore, written anonymously, Gemma of the Isles
- Alfred Lord Tennyson, Idylls of the King including "Enid," "Vivien," "Elaine," and "Guinevere" (see also The Holy Grail 1869, Idylls of the King 1870, Gareth and Lynette 1872, "Balin and Balan" in Tiresias 1885, Idylls of the King 1889)

=== Other in English ===
- Thomas Bailey Aldrich, The Ballad of Babie Bell and Other Poems, United States
- William Kirby, The U.E.: A Tale of Upper Canada, Niagara-on-the-Lake, Canada

== Works published in other languages ==
- Victor Hugo, La Légende des siècles, first series (see other series 1877, 1883), France
- Auguste de Villiers de L'Isle-Adam, Premières Poésies, France
- Frédéric Mistral, Mirèio, France (Occitan language)
- Casimiro de Abreu, As Primaveras, Brazil

== Births ==
Death years link to the corresponding "[year] in poetry" article:

- January 13 (January 8 OS) – Kostis Palamas (died 1943), Greek poet
- February 24 – Susie Frances Riley, Canadian poet
- February 25 – James Kenneth Stephen (died 1892), English poet and tutor to Prince Albert Victor, son of Albert Edward, Prince of Wales
- March 26 – A. E. Housman (died 1936), English classical scholar and poet
- April 5 – William Herbert Carruth (died 1924), American educator and poet
- May 6 – Willem Kloos (died 1938), Dutch poet and critic
- June 10 – Jacques Perk (died 1881), Dutch poet
- June 12 – Guido Mazzoni (died 1943), Italian poet
- July 17 – Ernest Rhys (died 1946), English writer, essayist, poet, novelist, playwright and short-story writer best known as founding editor of Everyman's Library series of affordable classics
- July 25 – Minnie Gow Walsworth (died 1947), American poet
- August 12 – Katharine Lee Bates (died 1929), American poet best known as the author of the words to the anthem "America the Beautiful"; her poem "Goody Santa Claus on a Sleigh Ride" (1889) popularizes "Mrs. Santa Claus"
- September 19 – Annie Wall Barnett (died 1942), American poet
- November 2 – Augusta Peaux (died 1944), Dutch poet
- November 4 – Perceval Gibbon (died 1926), South African poet, short-story writer, author and journalist
- December 16 – Francis Thompson (died 1907) English poet
- Also – Narasinghrao (died 1937), Indian, Gujarati-language poet and writer

== Deaths ==
Birth years link to the corresponding "[year] in poetry" article:

- January 23 – Bettina von Arnim (born 1785), German writer, poet, composer and novelist
- January 23 – Iswarchandra Gupta (born 1811), Bengali poet and writer
- February 13 – Eliza Acton (born 1799), English poet and cook who produced one of the country's first cookbooks aimed at the domestic reader rather than the professional
- March 30 – James Matthews Legaré (born 1823), American poet and failed inventor
- April 3 – Reginald Heber (born 1783, English Anglican bishop, poet and hymn writer
- April 14 – Sydney, Lady Morgan, née Owenson (born about 1781), Irish novelist and poet
- July 23 – Marceline Desbordes-Valmore (born 1786), French
- August 28 – Leigh Hunt (born 1784), English critic, essayist, poet and writer
- November 28 – Washington Irving (born 1783) American author, essayist, biographer, historian and poet
- December 28 – Thomas Babington Macaulay, 1st Baron Macaulay (born 1800) English historian, Whig politician and poet

== See also ==
- 19th century in poetry
- 19th century in literature
- List of years in poetry
- List of years in literature
- Victorian literature
- French literature of the 19th century
- Poetry
