= 1851 in poetry =

List of years in poetry	(table)
- … 1841; 1842; 1843; 1844; 1845; 1846; 1847; 1848; 1849; 1850; 1851; 1852; 1853; 1854; 1855; 1856; 1857; 1858; 1859; 1860; 1861 …
- In literature 1848 1849 1850 1851 1852 1853 1854
- Art; Archaeology; Architecture; Literature; Music; Philosophy; Science; +...

Nationality words link to articles with information on the nation's poetry or literature (for instance, Irish or France).

== Events ==
June – While waiting to cross the English Channel on honeymoon, English poet Matthew Arnold probably begins to compose the poem "Dover Beach" (published 1867).

== Works published in English ==
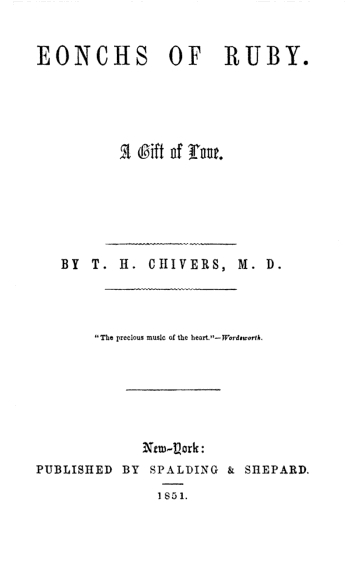
Title page of Thomas Holley Chivers' Eonchs of Ruby

=== United Kingdom ===
- Thomas Lovell Beddoes, Poems Posthumous and Collected
- Edward Henry Bickersteth, Nineveh
- Elizabeth Barrett Browning, Casa Guidi Windows
- Caroline Clive, under the pen name "V", The Valley of the Rea
- Hartley Coleridge, Poems by Hartley Coleridge, edited by Derwent Coleridge (posthumous)
- George Meredith, Poems, including the first version of "Love in the Valley"

=== United States ===
- Thomas Holley Chivers, Eonchs of Ruby: A Gift of Love
- Theodore Sedgwick Fay, Ulric; or, The Voices
- Henry Wadsworth Longfellow, The Golden Legend (republished under the title Christius 1872)
- William Wilberforce Lord, Christ in Hades
- Henry Theodore Tuckerman, Poems
- Frances Fuller Victor, with Metta Victoria Victor, Poems of Sentiment and Imagination
- William Ross Wallace, Meditations in America, and Other Poems

== Works published in other languages ==
- Hilario Ascasubi, Santos Vega o los mellizos de la Flor, Spanish-language, Argentina
- Heinrich Heine, Romanzero, Germany
- Micah Joseph Lebensohn, Shire Bat Ẓiyyon, Hebrew-language, Lithuania

== Births ==
Dath years link to the corresponding "[year] in poetry" article:

- March 1 – Arthur Clement Hilton (died 1877), English
- May 8 – James Lister Cuthbertson (died 1910), Australian
- December 18 – John Farrell (died 1904), Australian
- December 20 – Thérèse Schwartze (died 1918), Dutch portrait painter and poet
- Date not known – Albery Allson Whitman (died 1901), African American

== Deaths ==
Birth years link to the corresponding "[year] in poetry" article:

- February 1 – Mary Shelley (born 1797), English novelist, short story writer, dramatist, essayist, biographer, travel writer and poet
- February 23 – Joanna Baillie (born 1762), Scottish poet and dramatist
- July 6 – David Macbeth Moir (born 1798), Scottish physician and writer
- October 31 (October 19 O.S.) – Petar II Petrović-Njegoš (born 1813), Serbian poet and Prince-Bishop of Montenegro
- December 19 – Henry Luttrell (born 1768), English politician, wit and writer of society verse

== See also ==
- 19th century in poetry
- 19th century in literature
- List of years in poetry
- List of years in literature
- Victorian literature
- French literature of the 19th century
- Poetry
