= 1982 in poetry =

Nationality words link to articles with information on the nation's poetry or literature (for instance, Irish or France).

== Events ==
- March 1 – Dylan Thomas posthumously honoured by a floor plaque in Poets' Corner, Westminster Abbey
- September – The New Criterion founded in New York City
- October – Canadian documentary film Poetry in Motion released
- Final edition of This magazine published in Canada

== Works published in English ==
Listed by nation where the work was first published and again by the poet's native land, if different; substantially revised works listed separately:

=== Australia ===
- M. Duwell, editor, A Possible Contemporary Poetry (scholarship)
- Chris Mansell, Head, Heart & Stone (Fling Publishers)
- Les Murray:
  - Equanimities
  - The Vernacular Republic: Poems 1961-1981, Angus & Robertson; Edinburgh, Canongate; New York, Persea Books, 1982 and (enlarged and revised edition) Angus & Robertson, 1988
- A. Paolucci and L. Dobrez, editors, Review of National Literatures: Australia (scholarship)

=== Canada ===
- Margaret Atwood, The New Oxford Book of Canadian Verse in English (anthology)
- Margaret Avison, Winter Sun /The Dumbfounding: Poems 1940-66
- Dionne Brand, Primitive Offensive
- Don Domanski, War in an Empty House
- Robert Finch, Twelve for Christmas.
- Diane Keating, No Birds or Flowers
- Irving Layton, A Wild Peculiar Joy: Selected Poems, 1945-82 Toronto: McClelland and Stewart.
- Gwendolyn MacEwen:
  - The Fire Eaters.
  - The T. E. Lawrence Poems
  - Earth-Light: Selected Poetry 1963-1982. Toronto: General Publishing. ISBN 978-0-7736-1117-7
- Elizabeth Smart, Eleven Poems
- Michael Ondaatje, Running in the Family, memoir, New York: W. W. Norton, ISBN 0-393-01637-4, ISBN 0-7710-6884-0
- Wilfred Watson, Mass on Cowback.
- Phyllis Webb, The Vision Tree: Selected Poems

=== India, in English ===
- Keki Daruwalla, The Keeper of the Dead ( Poetry in English ), winner of the Central Sahitya Academy Award in 1984; Delhi: Oxford University Press
- Nissim Ezekiel, Latter-Day Psalms ( Poetry in English ),
- Arvind Krishna Mehrotra, Distance in Statute Miles ( Poetry in English ),
- Suniti Namjoshi, The Authentic Lie ( Poetry in English ), Fredericton, New Brunswick: Fiddlehead, ISBN 0-86492-010-5

=== Ireland ===
- Dermot Bolger, No Waiting America
- Harry Clifton, Comparative Lives, Oldcastle: The Gallery Press, ISBN 978-0-904011-33-3
- Pearse Hutchinson, Selected Poems, including "Malaga" and "Gaeltacht", Oldcastle: The Gallery Press
- Paul Muldoon, Out of Siberia, Northern Ireland native published in the United Kingdom
- Seamus Heaney: Poems and a Memoir, Limited Editions Club, Northern Ireland native living at this time in the United States
- Derek Mahon:
  - The Hunt by Night, including "Courtyards in Delft", "Rathlin" and "Tractatus", Oxford University Press, Irish poet published in the United Kingdom
  - Translator, The Chimeras, Gallery Press, translation from the French of Les Chimères by Nerval
- John Montague, Selected Poems, including "A Drink of Milk", "Family Conference" and "The Cave of Night"

=== New Zealand ===
- Fleur Adcock (New Zealand poet who moved to England in 1963), editor, Oxford Book of Contemporary New Zealand Poetry, Auckland: Oxford University Press
- Allen Curnow, You Will Know When You Get There: Poems 1979–81
- W. Ihimaera and D. S. Long, Into the World of Light: An Anthology of Maori Writing
- Bill Manhire, Good Looks, New Zealand
- Cilla McQueen, Homing In, winner of the New Zealand Book Award for Poetry and the 1983 Jessie MacKay Award
- W. H. Oliver, Poor Richard: Poems, Wellington: Port Nicholson Press, New Zealand

=== United Kingdom ===
- Peter Ackroyd, The Great Fire of London
- James Berry, Lucy's Letters and Loving
- Sir John Betjeman, Uncollected Poems
- Roald Dahl, Roald Dahl's Revolting Rhymes
- Patric Dickinson, A Rift in Time
- Carol Ann Duffy, Fifth Last Song, Headland
- Douglas Dunn, Europa's Lover
- Gavin Ewart, More Little Ones (see All My Little Ones, 1978)
- U. A. Fanthorpe, Standing To
- James Fenton, The Memory of War: Poems 1968-1982, Salamander Press,
- Geoffrey Grigson:
  - Collected Poems, 1963–1980
  - The Cornish Dancer, and Other Poems
- Thom Gunn, The Passages of Joy
- Seamus Heaney: Poems and a Memoir, Limited Editions Club, Northern Ireland native living at this time in the United States
- Seamus Heaney and Ted Hughes, editors, The Rattle Bag, Faber, anthology
- John Heath-Stubbs, Naming the Beasts
- Alan Hollinghurst, Confidential Chats with Boy
- Ted Hughes, Selected Poems 1957–1981
- Kathleen Jamie, Black Spiders
- Roger McGough, Waving at Trains
- Derek Mahon, The Hunt By Night. Oxford University Press
- Paul Muldoon, Out of Siberia, Northern Ireland native published in the United Kingdom
- Nerval, The Chimeras, a version of Les Chimères, translated from French by Derek Mahon, Gallery Press
- Norman Nicholson, Selected Poems 1940–82
- Tom Rawling, Ghosts At My Back
- Jeremy Reed, A Man Afraid
- E. J. Scovell, The Space Between
- Muriel Spark, Going Up to Sotheby's and Other Poems

=== United States ===
- A. R. Ammons, Worldly Hopes
- Louise Simone Bennett, Selected Poems
- Hayden Carruth, The Sleeping Beauty
- Nicholas Christopher, On Tour with Rita
- Robert Creeley:
  - Echoes
  - The Collected Poems, 1945–1975
- James Dickey, Puella
- Jack Gilbert, Monolithos
- Allen Ginsberg, Plutonian Ode: Poems 1977–1980
- H.D. (Hilda Doolittle, died 1961), Notes on Thought and Vision (written in 1919)
- Seamus Heaney: Poems and a Memoir, Limited Editions Club, Northern Ireland native living at this time in the United States
- Jane Hirshfield, Alaya
- Phyllis Janowitz, Visiting Rites
- Galway Kinnell, Selected Poems
- Denise Levertov, Candles in Babylon
- William Logan, Sad-faced Men
- James Merrill:
  - The Changing Light at Sandover, an epic poem
  - From the First Nine Poems
- W. S. Merwin, Finding the Islands, San Francisco: North Point Press
- Reynolds Price, Vital Provisions
- Peter Seaton, The Son Master (New York: Roof Books, The Segue Foundation)
- Gjertrud Schnackenberg, Portraits and Elegies
- Mona Van Duyn, Letters from a Father and Other Poems
- Theodore Weiss, Recoveries
- James Wright, This Journey

==== Criticism, scholarship and biography in the United States ====
- William Meredith, Reasons for Poetry, and The Reason for Criticism

=== Other in English ===
- Edward Brathwaite, Sun Poem, Caribbean poet living and publishing in the United States
- Mafika Gwala, No More Lullabies, South Africa
- Dennis Scott, Dreadwalk, Jamaica

== Works published in other languages ==
Listed by nation where the work was first published and again by the poet's native land, if different; substantially revised works listed separately:

=== France ===
- Aimé Césaire, Moi, laminaire, Martinique author published in France; Paris: Editions du Seuil
- Odysseus Elytis, Marie de Brumes translated by Xavier Bordes into French from the original Greek
- Abdellatif Laabi, translator, Rires de l'arbre à palabre from the original Arabic of Abdallah Zrika into French; Paris: L'Harmattan

=== India ===
Listed in alphabetical order by first name:

- Faiz Ahmad Faiz, Sare Sukhan Hamare, Indian, Urdu-language
- Gitaujali Badruddin, Poems of Gitaujali (posthumously published)
- Jayant Kaikini, Kotitirtha, Sagar, Karnataka: Akshara Prakashana, Indian, Kannada-language poet, short-story writer, and screenwriter
- K. Satchidanandan, Malayalam-language:
  - Janatayum Kavitayum, ("Poetry and the People"); criticism
  - Venal Mazha, ("The Summer Rain")
- Rajendra Kishore Panda, Shailakalpa ("Mountainesque"), Cuttack: Grantha Mandir, Oraya-language
- Mehr Lal Soni Zia Fatehabadi, Soch ka Safar (The Journey of Thought) - published by R.K.Sehgal, Bazm-e-Seemab, J 5/21, Rajouri Garden, New Delhi in 1982. Urdu
- Saroop Dhruv, Mara Hathni Vat, Ahmedabad: Nakshatra Trust, Ahmedabad; Gujarati-language

=== Poland ===
- Ryszard Krynicki, Jeżeli w jakimś kraju ("If in Some Country). Underground publisher S.i.s.n.
- Ewa Lipska, Nie o śmierć tutaj chodzi, lecz o biały kordonek ("Death Is Not at Stake, But the White Cord"), selected poems, Kraków: Wydawnictwo literackie
- Czesław Miłosz, Hymn o Perle ("The Poem of the Pearl"); Paris: Instytut Literacki
- Tadeusz Różewicz, Pułapka ("The Trap"), Warszawa: Czytelnik
- Adam Zagajewski, List - Oda do wielosci ("Letter - An Ode to Quantity"), Kraków: Pólka Poetów, (republished in 1983, Paris: Instytut literacki)

=== Spain ===
- Matilde Camus:
  - Testimonio ("Testimony")
  - La preocupación de Miguel Ángel ("The concern of Miguel Angel")

=== Other ===
- Arturo Corcuera, Puente de los Suspiros, Peru
- Odysseus Elytis, Three Poems under a Flag of Convenience (Τρία ποιήματα με σημαία ευκαιρίας), Greece
- Ndoc Gjetja, E përditshme ("The Daily"), Albania
- Klaus Høeck, Eno Zebra, with Asger Schnack, Denmark
- Alexander Mezhirov, Проза в стихах ("Prose in Verse") (winner of the USSR State Prize, 1986), Russia, Soviet Union
- Nizar Qabbani, A Poem For Balqis, Syrian poet writing in Arabic
- Rajendra Shah, Prasang-Spatak, Indian, writing in Gujarati
- Søren Ulrik Thomsen, Ukendt under den samme måne ("Unknown Under the Same Moon"), Denmark
- Marie Uguay, Autoportraits, French-Canadian (posthumous)
- Silvia Volckmann, Zeit der Kirschen? Das Naturbild in der deutschen Gegenwartslyrik (scholarship), West Germany

== Awards and honors ==
=== Australia ===
- Kenneth Slessor Prize for Poetry: Fay Zwicky, Kaddish and Other Poems

=== Canada ===
- Gerald Lampert Award: Abraham Boyarsky, Schielber and Edna Alford, A Sleep Full of Dreams
- 1982 Governor General's Awards: Phyllis Webb, The Vision Tree: Selected Poems (English); Michel Savard, Forages (French)
- Pat Lowther Award: Rona Murray, Journey
- Prix Émile-Nelligan: Jocelyne Felx, Orpailleuse and Philippe Haeck - La Parole verte

=== United Kingdom ===
- Cholmondeley Award: Basil Bunting, Herbert Lomas, William Scammell
- Eric Gregory Award: Steve Ellis, Jeremy Reed, Alison Brackenbury, Neil Astley, Chris O'Neill, Joseph Bristow, John Gibbens, James Lasdun

=== United States ===
- Academy of American Poets Fellowship: John Ashbery and John Frederick Nims
- Agnes Lynch Starrett Poetry Prize: Lawrence Joseph, Shouting at No One
- National Book Award: William Bronk for Life Supports (April 27)
- Bernard F. Connors Prize for Poetry: Gerald Stern, "Father Guzman"
- Consultant in Poetry to the Library of Congress (later the post would be called "Poet Laureate Consultant in Poetry to the Library of Congress"): Anthony Hecht appointed this year.
- Pulitzer Prize for Poetry: Sylvia Plath: The Collected Poems
- Rhysling Award:
  - Ursula K. Le Guin, The Well of Bain (Long Form)
  - Raymond DiZazzo, On the Speed of Sight (Short Form)
- Fellowship of the Academy of American Poets: John Frederick Nims and John Ashbery
- North Carolina Poet Laureate: Sam Ragan appointed.

== Births ==
- January 14
  - Joe Dunthorne, Welsh novelist and poet
  - Luke Wright, English performance poet
- April 27 – Patricia Lockwood, American poet
- Paul-Henri Campbell, German American poet
- Roger Robinson, British dub poet
- Chris Tse, New Zealand poet, short story writer and editor

== Deaths ==
Birth years link to the corresponding "[year] in poetry" article:

- January 19 – Marya Zaturenska, 80 (born 1902), American lyric poet, of heart failure
- March 11 – Horace Gregory, 83 (born 1898), American poet
- March 15 – Edgell Rickword, 83 (born 1898), English poet, critic, journalist and literary editor, a leading communist intellectual active in the 1930s
- March 18 – Yao Kitabatake 北畠 八穂, 78 (born 1903), Japanese, Shōwa period poet and children's fiction writer
- April 20
  - Archibald MacLeish, 89 (born 1892), American poet
  - Aco Šopov, 59 (born 1923), Macedonian poet
- June 5 – Junzaburō Nishiwaki 西脇順三郎, 88 (born 1894), Japanese, Shōwa period poet and literary critic
- June 6 – Kenneth Rexroth, 76 (born 1905), American poet, of a heart ailment
- June 18 – Djuna Barnes, 90 (born 1892), American writer and poet
- July 20 – Okot p'Bitek, 51 (born 1931), Ugandan poet
- October 22 – Richard Hugo, 58 (born 1923), American poet, of leukemia
- November 13 – Babette Deutsch, 87 (born 1895), American poet
- December 3 – Bishnu Dey, 73 (born 1909), Bengali poet, prose writer and movie critic

== See also ==
- Poetry
- List of years in poetry
- List of poetry awards
