= 1929 in poetry =

Nationality words link to articles with information on the nation's poetry or literature (for instance, Irish or France).

== Events ==
- April 29 – In the course of a domestic argument in London between poets and writers Robert Graves, Laura Riding, Geoffrey Phibbs and Graves's wife Nancy Nicholson, Riding and Graves jump from windows, she sustaining life-threatening injuries. Later this year, Graves and Riding go to live together in Mallorca. Graves's autobiography Good-Bye to All That is published this year, also.
- The Little Review, edited by Margaret Caroline Anderson and Jane Heap, ceases publication.
- The Dial ceases publication.

== Works published in English ==
=== Canada ===
- Arthur Bourinot, Ottawa Lyrics and verses for children.
- Frederick George Scott, New Poems.

=== India, in English ===
- Raul De Loyola Furtado (Poetry in English), The Desperrado, London: Chapman and Hall; Indian poet writing in English and published in the United Kingdom
- Nagendranath Gupta, editor and translator, Eastern Poetry (Poetry in English), Allahabad: Indian Press, (second edition Bombay: Hind Kitabs, 1951), poetry anthology

=== United Kingdom ===
- Ursula Bethell, From a Garden in the Antipodes, "by Evelyn Hayes" (pseudonym), London: Sidgwick & Jackson, New Zealand poet published in Britain:
- Edmund Blunden, Near and Far
- Robert Bridges, The Testament of Beauty
- W. H. Davies, Ambition, and Other Poems
- Cecil Day-Lewis, Transitional Poem
- T. S. Eliot:
  - Animula
  - "Som de l'escalina" (later to become part III of Ash Wednesday, published in 1930) was published in the Autumn, 1929 issue of Commerce along with a French translation.
- Aldous Huxley, Arabia Infelix, and Other Poems
- D. H. Lawrence, Pansies
- Louis MacNeice, Blind Fireworks
- Charlotte Mew, The Rambling Sailor
- William Plomer, The Family Tree
- I. A. Richards, Practical Criticism: A Study in Literary Judgement
- T. H. White, Loved Helen, and Other Poems
- W. B. Yeats, Irish poet published in the United Kingdom:
  - A Packet for Ezra Pound
  - The Winding Stair

=== United States ===
- Léonie Adams, High Falcon
- Conrad Aiken, Selected Poems
- Djuna Barnes, A Night Among the Horses a collection of prose and poetry expanded from her 1923 volume, A Book
- Louise Bogan, Dark Summer
- James Branch Cabell, Sonnets from Antan
- Malcolm Cowley, Blue Juniata
- Countee Cullen, The Black Christ
- Emily Dickinson, Further Poems, 150 recently discovered poems; Little, Brown, & Company
- Hilda Doolittle, writing under the pen name "H.D.", Red Roses for Bronze
- Kenneth Fearing, Angel Arms
- Robinson Jeffers, Dear Judas and Other Poems
- Vachel Lindsay, Every Soul is a Circus
- Edgar Lee Masters, The Fate of the Jury
- Lola Ridge, Firehead
- Edwin Arlington Robinson, Cavender's House
- E. B. White, The Lady is Cold
- Edmund Wilson, Poets, Farewell
- Elinor Wylie, Angels and Earthly Creatures

=== Other in English ===
- Ursula Bethell, From a Garden in the Antipodes, "by Evelyn Hayes" (pseudonym), London: Sidgwick & Jackson, New Zealand poet published in Britain:
- Robin Hyde, The Desolate Star, New Zealand
- Voices from Summerland, the first major anthology of Jamaican poetry
- W. B. Yeats, Irish poet published in the United Kingdom:
  - A Packet for Ezra Pound
  - The Winding Stair

== Works published in other languages ==
=== France ===
- Louis Aragon, La Grande Gaite
- Jacques Audiberti, L'Empire et la Trappe, the author's first book of poems; winner of the Prix Mallarme
- Paul Éluard, L'Amour la poésie
- Oscar Vladislas de Lubicz-Milosz, also known as O. V. de L. Milosz, Poèmes
- Alphonse Métérié, ''Petit Maroc
- Henri Michaux:
  - Ecuador, poetry and prose
  - Mes Proprietés ("My Properties"), may be considered prose poems
- Pierre Reverdy, Sources du vent
- J. Slauerhoff, Fleurs de Marécage, Dutch poet writing in French, published in Belgium

=== Indian subcontinent ===
Including all of the British colonies that later became India, Pakistan, Bangladesh, Sri Lanka and Nepal. Listed alphabetically by first name, regardless of surname:

==== Hindi ====
- Jagannathdas Ratnakar, Uddhava Satak, written in Brajabhasa in the Bhramaragit tradition of Krishna Bhakti verse; Hindi
- Nirala Suryakant Tripathi, Parimal, Hindi poems influenced by Chayavadi sensibility; includes "Juhi Ki Kali", a well-known poem in Hindi; also includes "Vidhava" and "Badal Rag"
- Ram Kumar Varma, Cittaur Ki Cita, Hindi-language historical poem on the glory of the Rajputs written in the Chayavadi style
- Ram Naresh Tripathi, Svapna, Hindi epic poem on women and patriotism
- Ramachandra Shukla, Hindi Sahitya Ka Itihas, one of the earliest and most influential histories of Hindi literature; scholarship
- Uday Shankar Bhatta, Takasila, Hindi epic on the ancient glory of the city of Takshasila

==== Malayalam ====
- Narayana Panikkar, Kerala Bhasa Sahitya Caritram, literary history in seven volumes, published from this year to 1951; won the first Sahitya Akademi Award for Malayalam literature in 1955; scholarship
- P. K. Narayana Pillai, Tucattezhuttaccan, a study, in Malayalam of 16th-century poet Ezhuttacchan; criticism
- Ullur Paramesvara Iyer:
  - Pingala, a well known khandakavya
  - Karnabhusanam, on the episode in the Mahabharata in which Karna gives away his protective kavaca and kundals to Indra, disguised as a brahman

==== Urdu ====
- Hafiz Jalandhari, Shahnamah-yi Islam, a history of the Islamic Empire in four volumes of verse, published from this year to 1947
- Mohammad Iqbal, Bang-e-Dara ("The Caravan Bell")
- Dr. Rafiq Hussain and Amar Nath Jha, Urdu ghazal ki nashv o numa, treatise on the evolution of the Urdu ghazal

==== Other Indian languages ====
- Devulappali Krishna Shastri, written in Telugu:
  - Pravasamu, very influential in Telugu poetry of its time
  - Urvasi, very influential in Telugu poetry of its time
- Dharmeshvari Devi Baruani, Phular Sarai, Assamese
- L. Kamal Singh, Lei pareng ("Garland"), Manipuri lyrics, many focusing on love for nature and solitude; academic and anthologist Sisir Kumar Das has called the work a landmark in Manipuri literature with which "modern Manipuri poetry began"
- Mu. Raghava Ayyankar, Alvarkal Kalanilai, literary history of the 12 Alvars, saint poets of the Vaishnava sect, with an evaluation of their works as influenced by various factors; a Tamil-language work
- Jasimuddin, Naksikathar Math, narrative poem in Bengali about a tragic love story of a Hindu boy and a Muslim girl; a companion volume to Rakhali 1930 and Dhankhet 1932
- R. Narasimhachar, Karnataka Kavi Carite, Volume 3 of a three-volume history of Kannada literature, and written in that language (see also Volume 1, 1907); scholarship
- Rabinidrath Thakur, Mahuya, primarily live poems in Bengali
- U. V. Swaminatha Ayyar, Cankattamilum Pirkalattamilum, essays summarizing 10 lectures delivered at Madras University in 1927 on Sangam literature and post-Sangam literature
- Vakil Ahmed Shah Qureshi, Qissa Sulaiman O Bilqis, sufistic narrative poem in Kashmiri
- Zeb-un-Nissa (died 1702), Diwan-i-Makhfi, written in Persian

=== Spanish language ===
==== Spain ====
- Rafael Alberti:
  - Cal y canto ("Lime and Song")
  - Sobre los ángeles ("Over the Angels")
- Pedro Salinas, Seguro Azar (1924–1928) ("Certain Chance")
- José Moreno Villa, Jacinta la pelirroja ("Jacinta the Redhead")

==== Latin America ====
- José María Eguren, Poesías, Peru
- Carlos Oquendo de Amat, 5 metros de poemas, Peru

=== Other languages ===
- Alfred Desrochers, A l'ombre d'Orford, philosophical verse and poetry influenced by le terroir movement, French language, Canada
- Halina Konopacka, Któregoś dnia (Some Day), Poland
- Mikhail Kuzmin, The Trout Breaks the Ice, Russian language, Soviet Union
- Peider Lansel, Il vegl chalamêr, Romansh language, Switzerland
- Rainer Maria Rilke (1875-1926), Letters to a Young Poet, influential compilation of 10 letters sent to military academy cadet Franz Xaver Kappus (1883-1966) from 1902 to 1908, published by Kappus and Insel Verlag this year; Germany

== Awards and honors ==
=== United States ===
- American Academy of Arts and Letters Gold Medal for Poetry: Edwin Arlington Robinson
- Pulitzer Prize for Poetry: Stephen Vincent Benét, John Brown's Body

== Births ==
Death years link to the corresponding "[year] in poetry" article:

- January 9 – Heiner Müller (died 1995), German
- January 11 – Peter Dale Scott, Canadian poet and academic
- January 12 – Turner Cassity, American
- February 16 – Peter Porter (died 2010), Australian-born British poet, member of The Group, recipient of Medal of the Order of Australia
- February 28 – John Montague (died 2016), American-born Irish
- March 6 – Günter Kunert (died 2019), German
- April 2 – Edward Dorn (died 1999), American poet associated with the Black Mountain poets
- May 16 – Adrienne Rich (died 2012), American poet
- June 2 – Robert Dana (died 2010), American, poet laureate for the State of Iowa from 2004 to 2008
- June 11 – George Garrett (died 2008), American poet and novelist
- July 13 – Teresa Bogusławska (died 1945), Polish poet and resistance worker
- July 15 – Rhoda Bulter (died 1994), Scottish poet
- July 22 – U. A. Fanthorpe (died 2009), born Ursula Askham Fanthorpe, English
- August 5 – Al Alvarez (died 2019), English poet, writer, editor and critic
- August 11 – Geeta Parikh (died 2012), Gujarati
- August 21 – X. J. Kennedy, American formalist poet, translator, anthologist and writer of children's literature (died 2026)
- August 29 – Thom Gunn (died 2004), English-born poet
- September 26 – Ned O'Gorman (died 2014), American poet and educator
- October 13 – Richard Howard, American poet, literary critic, essayist, teacher and translator
- October 21 – Donald Finkel (died 2008), American poet and academic, husband of poet and novelist Constance Urdang
- October 23 – Shamsur Rahman (also spelled "Shamsur Ruhman") (died 2006), Bengali poet, columnist and journalist
- October 25 – Peter Rühmkorf (died 2008), German writer and poet
- October 26 – Dane Zajc (died 2005), Slovenian poet
- October 28 – John Hollander (died 2013), American poet and literary critic
- November 11 – Hans Magnus Enzensberger (died 2022), German poet and essayist
- December 9 – Don Maclennan (died 2009), English-born South African poet, critic and academic

== Deaths ==
Birth years link to the corresponding "[year] in poetry" article:

- February 27 – Libbie C. Riley Baer (born 1849), American patriotic poet
- March 8 – Geoffrey Anketell Studdert Kennedy, 45 (born 1883), British poet and Anglican priest nicknamed "Woodbine Willy" during World War I for giving Woodbine cigarettes along with spiritual aid to injured and dying soldiers
- March 28 – Katharine Lee Bates, 69, American poet best known as the author of the words to the anthem "America the Beautiful"
- June 8 – Bliss Carman, 68 (born 1861), Canadian poet
- July 15 – Hugo von Hofmannsthal, 55, Austrian novelist, librettist, poet and dramatist
- October – Arno Holz, 66 (born 1863), German Naturalist poet and dramatist
- November 3 – Olav Aukrust, 46 (born 1883), Norwegian poet and teacher

== See also ==
- Poetry
- List of poetry awards
- List of years in poetry
- New Objectivity in German literature and art
- Oberiu movement in Russian art and poetry
