= 1861 in poetry =

List of years in poetry	(table)
- … 1851; 1852; 1853; 1854; 1855; 1856; 1857; 1858; 1859; 1860; 1861; 1862; 1863; 1864; 1865; 1866; 1867; 1868; 1869; 1870; 1871 …
- In literature 1858 1859 1860 1861 1862 1863 1864
- Art; Archaeology; Architecture; Literature; Music; Philosophy; Science; +...

Nationality words link to articles with information on the nation's poetry or literature (for instance, Irish or France).

== Events ==
- June 29 – Elizabeth Barrett Browning dies in the arms of her husband and fellow poet Robert Browning in Florence; on July 1 she is buried in the Protestant cemetery there. Robert leaves the city soon afterwards
- November 19 – Julia Ward Howe composes "The Battle Hymn of the Republic"

== Works published in English ==
=== United Kingdom ===
- Matthew Arnold, On Translating Homer (see also F. W. Newman's response, Homeric Translation, below), criticism
- Richard Watson Dixon, Christ's Company, and Other Poems
- Edward Lear, A Book of Nonsense (3rd edition, the first giving the author's name and with woodcut illustrations)
- Alexander McLachlan, The Emigrant and Other Poems, Toronto, Canada
- Francis William Newman, Homeric Translation in Theory and Practice, a reply to Matthew Arnold's On Translating Homer, above; Arnold replied with On Translating Homer: Last Words in 1862, criticism
- Francis Turner Palgrave, The Golden Treasury of Songs and Lyrics (a poetic anthology revised and enlarged in 1891; second series published in 1897)
- Dante Gabriel Rossetti, The Early Italian Poets (reissued in 1874 under the title Dante and his Circle)
- Annie Louisa Walker, Leaves from the Backwoods

=== United States ===
- Thomas Bailey Aldrich, Pampinea and Other Poems
- Lucius Manlius, The Ballad of the Abolition Blunderbuss
- Edmund Clarence Stedman, The Battle of Bull Run about the First Battle of Bull Run

== Works published in other languages ==
- Aleardo Aleardi, I sette soldati ("The Seven Soldiers"), Italy
- Michael Madhusudan Dutt, Meghnad Badh Kabya (মেঘনাদবধ কাব্য, "Slaying of Meghnad"), Bengali
- Joseph Fiset, Jude et Grazia; ou, Les malheurs de l'émigration; French language; a long narrative poem; Quebec, Canada
- Imre Madách, The Tragedy of Man (Az ember tragédiája), Hungary; poetic drama
- Nikolai Nekrasov, Korobeiniki, Russian
- Frederik Paludan-Müller, Denmark:
  - Paradiset ("Paradise")
  - Benedikt fra Nurcia ("Benedict of Nurcia")

== Births ==
Death years link to the corresponding "[year] in poetry" article:

- January 7 – Louise Imogen Guiney (died 1920), American poet and essayist
- January 12 – Jack Moses, Australian poet (died 1945)
- January 15 – Saint-Pol-Roux, pen name of Paul Roux (died 1940), French
- January 22 – Maurice Hewlett (died 1923), English historical novelist, poet and essayist
- January 23 – Katharine Tynan (died 1931), Irish-born novelist, poet and writer who, after her marriage in 1898, usually wrote under the names "Katharine Tynan Hinkson", "Katharine Tynan-Hinkson" or "Katharine Hinkson-Tynan"
- March 10 – Pauline Johnson, also known as "E. Pauline Johnson" and "Tekahionwake" (died 1913), Canadian known for her poems and performances that celebrate her aboriginal heritage, including the frequently anthologized "The Song My Paddle Sings"
- April 7 – Frederick George Scott (died 1944), Canadian
- April 15 – Bliss Carman (died 1929), Canadian poet
- May 7 – Rabindranath Tagore (died 1941), Bengali poet in India, Brahmo Samaj (syncretic Hindu monotheist) philosopher, visual artist, playwright, composer and novelist whose works reshaped Bengali literature and music in the late 19th and early 20th centuries; 1913 winner of the Nobel Prize in Literature
- July 26 – Vazha-Pshavela (died 1915), Georgian poet
- September 5 – Walter Alexander Raleigh (died 1922), Scottish scholar, poet and author
- September 23 – Mary Elizabeth Coleridge (died 1907), English novelist, poet and teacher writing poetry under the pseudonym Anodos (taken from George MacDonald); great-grandniece of Samuel Taylor Coleridge and great niece of Sara Coleridge
- October 16 – Arthur Alfred Lynch (died 1934), Australian-born, Irish and British civil engineer, physician, journalist, author, soldier, anti-imperialist and polymath serving as a member of the House of Commons after being convicted of treason, sentenced to death, having his sentence reduced and then being released (for having recruited volunteers for the Boer side during the Boer War in South Africa), later raising his own Irish battalion towards the end of World War I
- October 21 – Charles Van Lerberghe (died 1907), French
- November 10 – Amy Levy (died 1889), English poet and novelist
- November 17 – Archibald Lampman (died 1899), Canadian

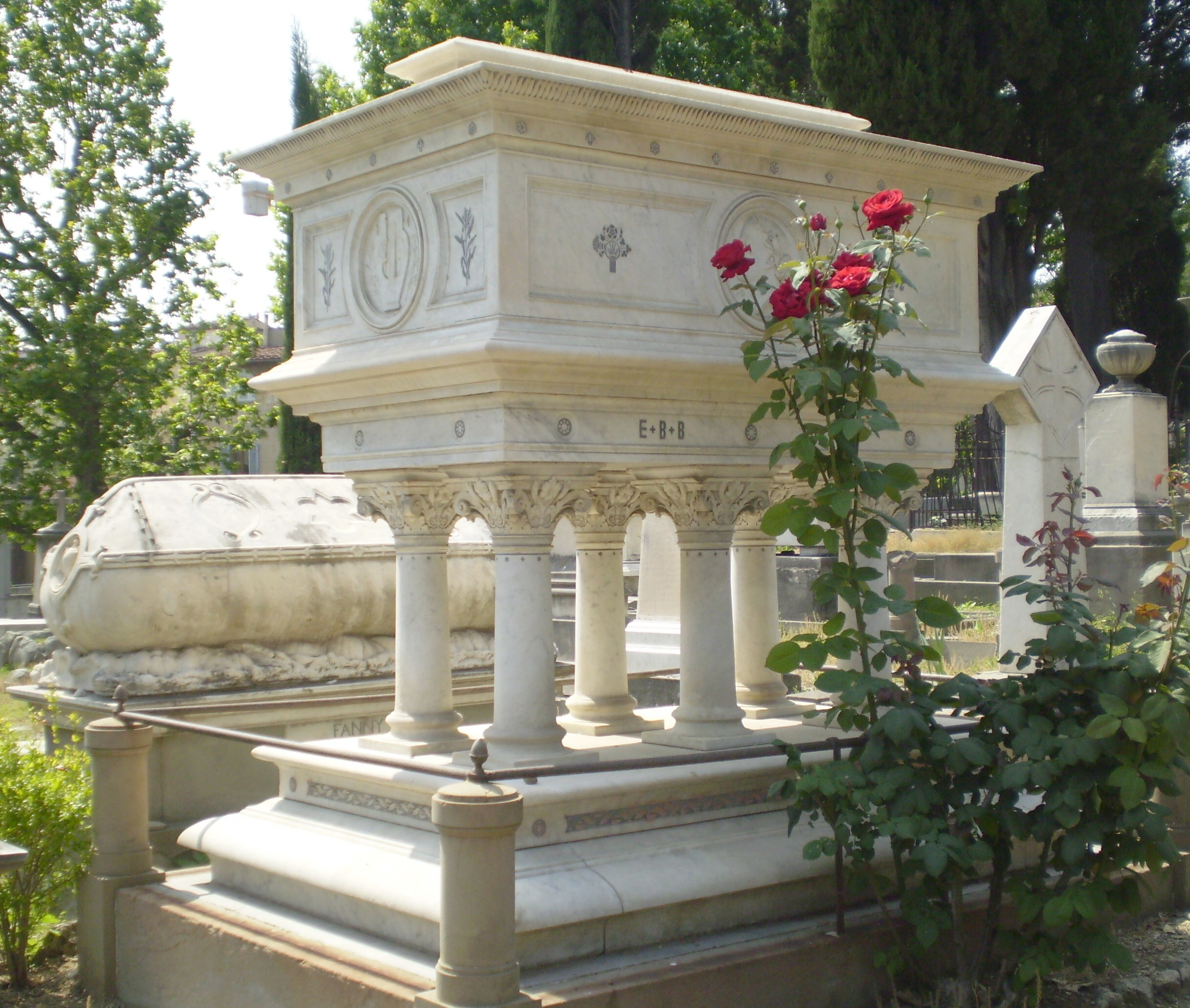
Elizabeth Barrett Browning tomb in Florence

== Deaths ==
Birth years link to the corresponding "[year] in poetry" article:

- March 10 (February 26 O.S.) - Taras Shevchenko, 47 (born 1814), Ukrainian poet and artist
- June 29 – Elizabeth Barrett Browning, 56 (born 1806), English poet and poet and wife of Robert Browning
- November 13 – Arthur Hugh Clough, 42 (born 1819), English poet and brother of suffragist Anne Jemima Clough

== See also ==
- 19th century in poetry
- 19th century in literature
- List of years in poetry
- List of years in literature
- Victorian literature
- French literature of the 19th century
- Poetry
