= 1853 in poetry =

List of years in poetry	(table)
- … 1843; 1844; 1845; 1846; 1847; 1848; 1849; 1850; 1851; 1852; 1853; 1854; 1855; 1856; 1857; 1858; 1859; 1860; 1861; 1862; 1863 …
- In literature 1850 1851 1852 1853 1854 1855 1856
- Art; Archaeology; Architecture; Literature; Music; Philosophy; Science; +...

Nationality words link to articles with information on the nation's poetry or literature (for instance, Irish or France).

== Events ==
- October 27 – English poet Alfred Tennyson settles at Farringford House on the Isle of Wight.

== Works published in English ==
=== United Kingdom ===
- Mrs. Cecil Frances Alexander, Narratyve Hymns for Village Schools
- Matthew Arnold, Poems: a New Edition, the first collected edition of the author's poems; known as Poems: First Series (see also 1855); including "Sobrab and Rustum" and "The Scholar Gipsy"
- R. D. Blackmore, writing under the pen name "Melanter", Poems by Melanter
- Martha Browne, (a.k.a. Mattie Griffith) Poems
- Elizabeth Barrett Browning, Poems (see also Poems 1844, 1850, 1856)
- Caroline Clive, writing under the pen name "V", The Morlas
- Sydney Dobell, Balder
- Coventry Patmore, Tamerton Church-Tower (see also 1878)
- Alexander Smith, Poems, Scottish poet

=== United States ===
- Thomas Holley Chivers:
  - Atlanta; or, the True Blessed Island of Poesy, a Paul Epic
  - Memoralia; or, Phials of Amber Full of the Tears of Love
  - Virginalia; or, Songs of My Summer Nights
- Samuel Longfellow, Thalatta: A Book for the Sea-side, compiled with Thomas Wentworth Higginson
- Lydia Huntley Sigourney, The Faded Hope
- William Gilmore Simms, Poems: Descriptive, Dramatic, Legendary and Contemplative, in two volumes, Charleston, South Carolina: John Russell
- Sarah Helen Whitman, Hours of Life
- John Greenleaf Whittier, The Chapel of the Hermits

=== Other ===
- Peter John Allan (died 1848), Poetical Remains of Peter John Allan, Esq., Canadian poet published in London
- Charles Harpur, The Bushrangers: a Play in Five Acts, and other Poems, Australia

== Works published in other languages ==
- Hilario Ascasubi, Aniceto el Gallo, Argentina
- Álvares de Azevedo, Lira dos Vinte Anos, Brazil (posthumous)
- Paul Heyse, Lieder aus Sorrent ("Songs of Sorrento"), Germany
- Victor Hugo, Les Châtiments, France
- Friedrich Reinhold Kreutzwald, Kalevipoeg, Estonia (suppressed due to censorship)

== Births ==
Death years link to the corresponding "[year] in poetry" article:

- January 28 (O.S. January 16) – Vladimir Solovyov, Russian philosopher and poet (died 1900)
- February 18 – Ernest Fenollosa, American (died 1908)
- October 4 – Jane Maria Read, American poet and teacher (year of death unknown)

== Deaths ==
Birth years link to the corresponding "[year] in poetry" article:

- February 3 – August Kopisch, German poet and painter (born 1799)
- April 28 – Ludwig Tieck, German (born 1773)
- October 27 – Maria White Lowell, American (born 1821)
- December 2 – Amelia Opie, English novelist, writer and poet (born 1769)
- Dayaram, Indian, Gujarati-language poet (born 1757)

== See also ==
- 19th century in poetry
- 19th century in literature
- List of years in poetry
- List of years in literature
- Victorian literature
- French literature of the 19th century
- Poetry
