= 1863 in poetry =

Nationality words link to articles with information on the nation's poetry or literature (for instance, Irish or France).

== Events ==
- January 1 – American essayist and poet Ralph Waldo Emerson commemorates today's Emancipation Proclamation by composing "Boston Hymn" and surprising a crowd of 3,000 with its debut reading at Boston Music Hall.
- May 17 – Intimist poet Rosalía de Castro publishes her first collection in Galician, Cantares gallegos ("Galician Songs"), commemorated every year as the Día das Letras Galegas ("Galician Literature Day"), an official holiday of the Autonomous Community of Galicia in Spain.

== Works published in English ==
=== United Kingdom ===
- Elizabeth Barrett Browning, The Greek Christian Poets and the English Poets, essays first published in the Athenaeum 1842 and revised before the author's death; posthumous
- Robert Browning, Poetical Works, a mix of poems from Dramatic Lyrics 1842, Dramatic Romances and Lyrics 1845, and Men and Women 1855 (see also Poetical Works 1868)
- Jean Ingelow, Poems (23 editions by 1880; see also Poems 1880, Poems: Third Series 1885)
- Walter Savage Landor, Heroic Idyls with Additional Poems, the author's last published book
- Coventry Patmore, The Victories of Love, Volume 4 of The Angel in the House, first edition in the United Kingdom; first published in Macmillan's Magazine September–November 1861 (see also The Betrothal 1854, The Espousals 1856, Faithful for Ever 1860)
- Menella Bute Smedley, published anonymously, The Story of Queen Isabel, and Other Verses

=== Other in English ===
- Thomas Bailey Aldrich, Poems, United States
- Henry Wadsworth Longfellow, Tales of a Wayside Inn, including "Paul Revere's Ride" (1861), United States

== Works published in other languages ==
- János Arany, The Bards of Wales (A walesi bárdok), Hungarian (written 1857)
- Rosalía de Castro:
  - Cantares gallegos ("Galician Songs"), her first collection of poetry in Galician (see also "Events" section, above)
  - A mi madre, poems written in Spanish
- Uilleam Mac Dhun Lèibhe (William Livingston), Fios Thun A' Bhard, Scottish Gaelic poem published in Scotland
- Catulle Mendès, Philomela, France

== Births ==
Death years link to the corresponding "[year] in poetry" article:

- February – A. R. Raja Raja Varma (died 1918), Indian, Malayalam-language poet, grammarian, scholar, critic and writer; nephew of Kerala Varma Valiya Koil Thampuran
- April 26 – Arno Holz (died 1929), German Naturalist poet and dramatist
- April 29 – Constantine Cavafy (died 1933), Greek
- June 18 – George Essex Evans (died 1909), Australian
- July 19 – Dwijendralal Ray (died 1913) Bengali poet, playwright and musician, known primarily for patriotic plays and songs, as well as Hindu devotional lyrics
- August 1 – Stuart Merrill (died 1915), American poet writing primarily in French
- August 14 – Ernest Thayer (died 1940), American humorous writer best known for the poem Casey at the Bat
- September 1 – Violet Jacob, born Violet Kennedy-Erskine (died 1946), Scottish historical novelist and poet
- October 9 – Gamaliel Bradford (died 1932), American biographer, critic, poet and dramatist
- November 18 – Richard Dehmel (died 1920), German
- December 16 – George Santayana (died 1952), Spanish-born American philosopher, essayist, poet and novelist
- December 26 – Robert Fuller Murray (died 1894), American-born British
- date not known – Perunnelli Krishnan Vaidyar (died 1894), Indian, Malayalam-language poet

== Deaths ==
Birth years link to the corresponding "[year] in poetry" article:

- July 10 – Clement Moore (born 1779), American poet and credited author of A Visit from St. Nicholas (better known as Twas the Night Before Christmas)
- September 17 – Alfred de Vigny (born 1797), French poet, playwright, and novelist
- September 26 – Frederick William Faber (born 1814), English poet, hymnodist, theologian and Catholic convert
- December 21 – Giuseppe Gioachino Belli (born 1791), Italian poet famous for his sonnets in Romanesco, the dialect of Rome
- date not known – Hagiwara Hiromichi 萩原広道 (born 1815), Japanese late-Edo period scholar of literature, philology, and nativist studies (Kokugaku) as well as an author, translator, and poet; known for his commentary and literary analysis of The Tale of Genji (surname: Hagiwara)

== See also ==
- 19th century in poetry
- 19th century in literature
- List of years in poetry
- List of years in literature
- Victorian literature
- French literature of the 19th century
- Poetry
