= 1878 in poetry =

This article covers 1878 in poetry. Nationality words link to articles with information on the nation's poetry or literature (for instance, Irish or France).

== Events ==
- July – Notorious Scottish poetaster William McGonagall journeys on foot from Dundee to Balmoral Castle over mountainous terrain and through a violent thunderstorm in a fruitless attempt to perform his verse before Queen Victoria.
- July 26 – In California, the poet and American West outlaw calling himself "Black Bart" makes his last clean getaway when he steals a safe box from a Wells Fargo stagecoach. The empty box is found later with a taunting poem inside.
- Notorious American poetaster Julia A. Moore publishes her second collection, A Few Choice Words to the Public, but unlike her bestseller of 1876, The Sweet Singer of Michigan Salutes the Public, it finds few buyers. Moore gives her second public reading and singing performance late this year at a Grand Rapids opera house. She begins by admitting her poetry is "partly full of mistakes" and that "literary is a work very hard to do". After the poetry and the laughter and jeering in response is over, Moore ends the show by telling the audience:

You have come here and paid twenty-five cents to see a fool; I receive seventy-five dollars, and see a whole houseful of fools.

Her husband eventually forbids her from publishing any more poetry and in 1882 moves the family 100 miles (160 km) north.

== Works published in English ==
=== United Kingdom ===
- Wilfrid Scawen Blunt, Proteus and Amadeus
- Robert Browning, La Saisiaz; The Two Poets of Croisic
- Robert Buchanan, Poetical Works
- Coventry Patmore:
  - Amelia; Tamerton Church-Tower (Tamerton Church-Tower first published 1853)
  - The Unknown Eros, and Other Odes, first, shorter edition was published anonymously in 1877
- Mary F. Robinson, A Handful of Honeysuckle
- Algernon Charles Swinburne, Poems and Ballads, Second Series (see also First Series 1866, Third Series 1889)
- John Addington Symonds:
  - Many Moods
  - Shelley, biography
- Oscar Wilde, Ravenna

=== United States ===
- Charles Follen Adams, Leedle Yawcob Strauss, and Other Poems (see also Yawcob Strauss and Other Poems 1910)
- William Cullen Bryant, The Flood of Years
- Henry James, French Poets and Novelists, criticism
- Henry Wadsworth Longfellow, Kéramos and Other Poems
- John Greenleaf Whittier, The Vision of Echard, United States
- A Masque of Poets, an anonymous compilation edited by George Parsons Lathrop that included works by Emily Dickinson and John Townsend Trowbridge, among others

=== Other ===
- Chilichutnee, Social Scraps and Satires, Bombay; India, Indian poetry in English
- Toru Dutt, A Sheaf Gleaned in French Fields: Verse Translations and Poems, Bhowanipur: Saptahik Sambad Press, second, enlarged edition (first edition, Bhowanipur, Calcutta: B. M. Bose 1876; another edition: London: Kegan Paul 1880); India, Indian poetry in English

== Works published in other languages ==
- William Chapman, Les Québecquoises; French language; Quebec, Canada
- Joseph-Eudore Eventurel, Premières poésies; French language; Quebec, Canada
- Stéphane Mallarmé, Les Mots anglais, France
- Jan Neruda, Písně kosmické ("Cosmic Songs"), Czech
- Aleksey Konstantinovich Tolstoy, The Dream of Councillor Popov, Russian satire published in Berlin

== Births ==
Death years link to the corresponding "[year] in poetry" article:

- January 4 – A. E. Coppard (died 1957), English poet and short story writer
- January 6 – Carl Sandburg (died 1967), American poet and historian
- January 14 – Victor Segalen (died 1919), French naval doctor, professor of medicine in China, ethnographer, archeologist, writer, poet, explorer, art-theorist, linguist and literary critic
- January 21 – H. W. Garrod (died 1960), English literary scholar
- March 3 – Edward Thomas (died 1917) one of the best-known English poets of World War I, died in action at Arras
- April 3 – Hiraide Shū 平出修 (died 1914), Japanese, late Meiji period novelist, poet and lawyer; represented defendant in the High Treason Incident; a co-founder of the literary journal Subaru
- April 11 – Frank Oliver Call (died 1956), Canadian
- May 24 – Mary Grant Bruce (died 1958), Australian
- June 1 – John Edward Masefield (died 1967), English poet and writer, Poet Laureate, 1930–1967
- June 8 – William Stanley Braithwaite (died 1962), American
- July 6 – Eino Leino (died 1926), Finnish poet and journalist
- July 29 – Don Marquis (died 1937), American poet, artist, newspaper columnist, humorist, playwright and author best known for creating the characters "Archy" and "Mehitabel"
- August 10 – Louis Esson (died 1943), Scottish-born Australian
- August 17 – Oliver St. John Gogarty (died 1957), Irish poet, writer, physician and ear surgeon, one of the most prominent Dublin wits, political figure of the Irish Free State, later best known as the inspiration for Buck Mulligan in James Joyce's novel Ulysses
- September 9 – Adelaide Crapsey (died 1914), American
- October 2 – Wilfrid Wilson Gibson (died 1962), British poet, associated with World War I but also the author of much later work
- October 13 – Patrick Joseph Hartigan [John O'Brien] (died 1952), Australian Roman Catholic priest and poet
- October 16 – Vallathol Narayana Menon (died 1958), Indian, Malayalam-language poet
- November 27 – Jatindramohan Bagchi (died 1948), Bengali poet
- December 7 – Akiko Yosano 与謝野 晶子 pen-name of Yosano Shiyo (died 1942), late Meiji period, Taishō period and early Shōwa period poet, pioneering feminist, pacifist and social reformer; one of the most famous, and most controversial, post-classical woman poets of Japan
- December 18 – Ioseb Besarionis dze Jughashvili (died 1953), Georgian poet and Soviet dictator

== Deaths ==
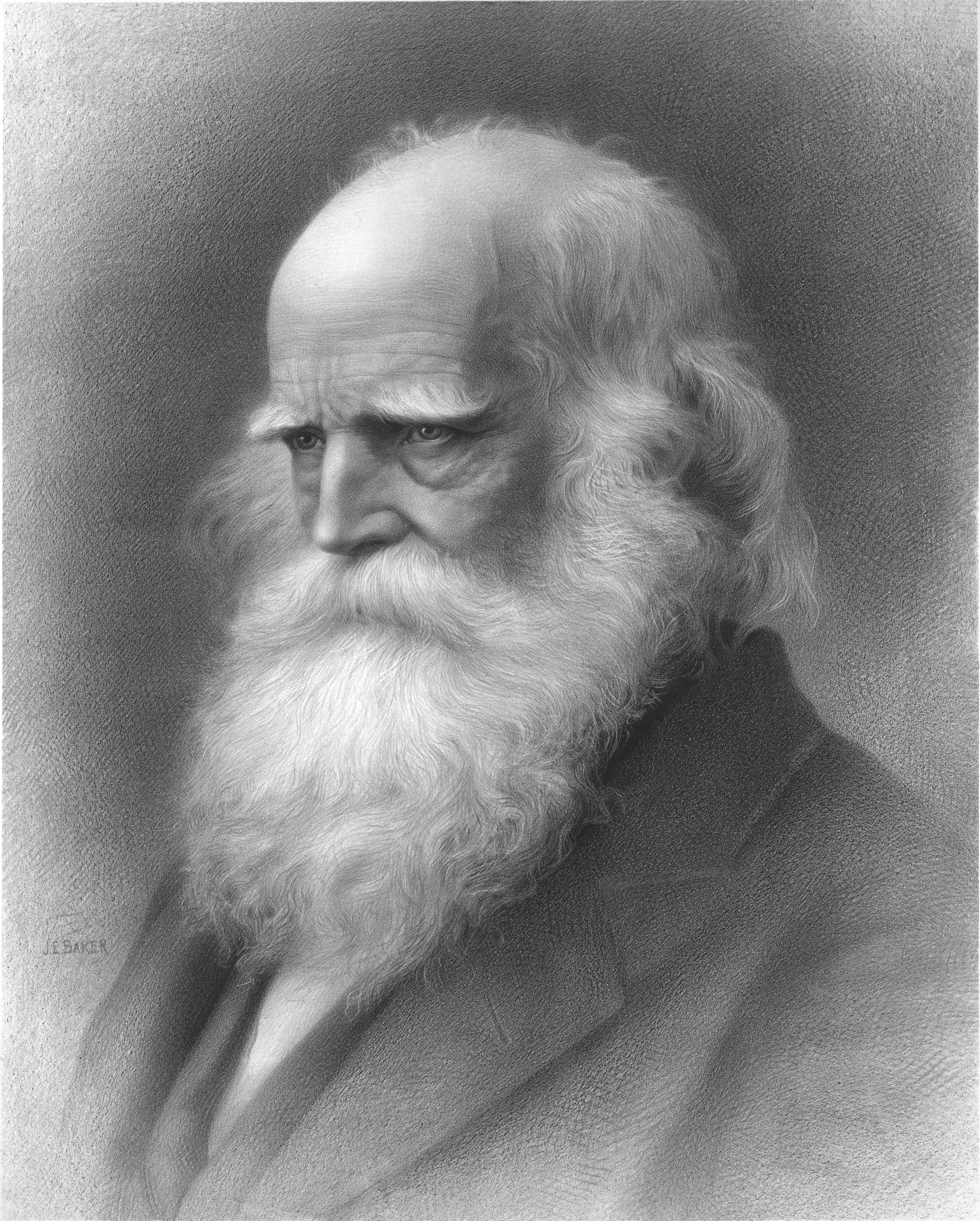
William Cullen Bryant, from a lithograph published in 1876

Birth years link to the corresponding "[year] in poetry" article:

- January 8 – Nikolay Nekrasov, Никола́й Некра́сов (born 1821), Russian poet, writer, critic and publisher
- June 12 – William Cullen Bryant (born 1794), American romantic poet, journalist and long-time editor of the New York Evening Post
- June 27 – Sarah Helen Whitman (born 1803), American poet, essayist, transcendentalist, Spiritualist and a romantic interest of Edgar Allan Poe
- October 5 – George Boyer Vashon (born 1824), African-American attorney, educationalist, abolitionist, essayist and poet
- December 19 – Bayard Taylor (born 1825), American poet, literary critic, translator and travel author

== See also ==
- 19th century in poetry
- 19th century in literature
- List of years in poetry
- List of years in literature
- Victorian literature
- French literature of the 19th century
- Poetry
