= 1923 in poetry =

And miles to go before I sleep.

—From Robert Frost's "Stopping by Woods on a Snowy Evening", first published this year in his collection New Hampshire

Nationality words link to articles with information on the nation's poetry or literature (for instance, Irish or France).

== Events ==
- In Paris, Basil Bunting meets Ezra Pound, whose poems will have a strong influence on Bunting throughout his career.
- E. C. McFarlane and others found the Jamaican Poetry League.
- Xu Zhimo founds the Crescent Moon Society in China.
- December – Persian poet Nima Yooshij publishes the poem Afsaneh, the manifesto of the She'r-e Nimaa'i school of modernist poetry.

== Works published in English ==
=== Australia ===
- Dorothea Mackellar, Dreamharbour and Other Verses
- Jack Moses, "Nine Miles From Gundagai"
- John Shaw Neilson, Ballad and Lyrical Poems

=== Canada ===
- Arthur Bourinot, Lyrics from the hills
- Katherine Hale, ed., Isabella Valancy Crawford
- Thom MacInnes, Complete Poems
- Marjorie Pickthall (died 1922), Angels' Shoes
- E. J. Pratt, Newfoundland Verse, Canada
- Duncan Campbell Scott, The Witching of Elspie

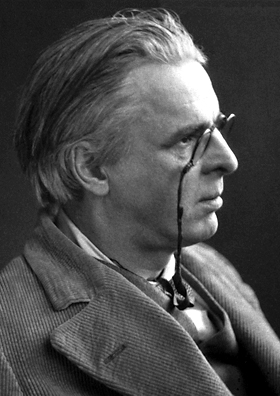
Picture of William Butler Yeats published this year, the same year The Cat and the Moon was published

=== Indian in English ===
- Ananda Acharya, Usarika ("Dawn-Rhythms")
- N. M. Chatterjee, India and Other Sonnets, Calcutta
- Margaret MacNicol, Poems by Indian Women, Calcutta: Association Press, 98 pages; anthology
- Oriental Blossoms, London: Heath Cranton; anthology
- Puran Singh, Unsung Beads, on mystical experiences and with social and political themes
- K. S. Venkataramani, On the Sand-Dune, Madras: Ganesh and Co.
- S. K. De, A history of Sanskrit Poetics, one of the earliest accounts of Sanskrit literary theories in English; scholarship

=== United Kingdom ===
- Harold Acton, Aquarium
- Edmund Blunden, To Nature
- W. H. Davies, Collected Poems, second series; first series, 1916, see also Collected Poems, 1928; Poems, 1934
- Walter De La Mare, Come Hither: A Collection of Rhymes and Poems for the Young of all Ages (anthology)
- John Drinkwater, Collected Poems, in three volumes, published 1923–1937
- T. S. Eliot, The Waste Land (1922) first published in the U.K. in book form complete with notes in a limited edition in September 1923 by the Hogarth Press of Richmond upon Thames, run by Eliot's Bloomsbury Group friends Leonard and Virginia Woolf, the type handset by Virginia (completed in July))
- Robert Graves, Whipperginny
- D. H. Lawrence, Birds, Beasts and Flowers, including "Snake", published in the United Kingdom in November; first published in the United States in October; English poet and author living in the United States (1922–1925)
- Hugh MacDiarmid (pen name of Christopher Murray Grieve, the name used for this book), Annals of the Five Senses
- Katherine Mansfield, Poems (posthumous), New Zealand author living in Europe
- John Masefield:
  - Collected Poems
  - King Cole, and Other Poems
- Alice Meynell, Last Poems (posthumous)
- Susan Miles, Little Mirrors (probable date)
- Herbert Read, Mutations of the Phoenix
- Edith Sitwell, Bucolic Comedies
- Oriental Blossoms, London: Heath Cranton; anthology; Indian poetry in English, published in the United Kingdom
- Osbert Sitwell, Out of the Flame
- Jean Toomer, Cane
- William Butler Yeats, The Cat and the Moon, including "Leda and the Swan", Ireland and United Kingdom

=== United States ===
- Conrad Aiken, The Pilgrimage of Festus
- Stephen Vincent Benét:
  - King David
  - The Ballad of William Sycamore, 1790–1880
- Louise Bogan, Body of This Death
- Witter Bynner, Indian Earth
- E. E. Cummings, Tulips and Chimneys
- Djuna Barnes, A Book, collection of prose and poetry
- Robert Frost, New Hampshire including "Stopping by Woods on a Snowy Evening", "Fire and Ice", "Nothing Gold Can Say"
- Elsa Gidlow, On A Grey Thread, the first volume of openly lesbian love poetry published in North America
- D. H. Lawrence, Birds, Beasts and Flowers, including "Snake", published in the United States in October, published in the United Kingdom in November, English poet and author living in the United States (1922–1925)
- Vachel Lindsay, Going-to-the-Sun
- Edna St. Vincent Millay, The Harp-Weaver and Other Poems
- Lizette Woodworth Reese, Wild Cherry
- Edward Arlington Robinson, Roman Bartholow
- George Sterling, Selected Poems
- Wallace Stevens, Harmonium, including "Thirteen Ways of Looking at a Blackbird", "The Emperor of Ice-Cream", "Le Monocle de Mon Oncle", "Thirteen Ways of Looking at a Blackbird", "Peter Quince at the Clavier", "Sunday Morning", "Sea Surface Full of Clouds" and "In the Clear Season of Grapes". Stevens' first book, it is published by Knopf when he is in middle age (44 years old). Its first edition sells only a hundred copies before being remaindered, suggesting that Mark Van Doren has it right when he writes in The Nation this year that Stevens's wit "is tentative, perverse, and superfine; and it will never be popular" yet by 1960 the cottage industry of Stevens studies will be becoming a "multinational conglomerate" (Revised edition, 1931)
- Jean Toomer, Cane, a blend of poetry, fiction and dramatic sketches
- Amos Wilder, Battle Retrospect, Yale University Press (this year's winner of the Yale Series of Younger Poets)
- William Carlos Williams:
  - Go Go
  - Spring and All

=== Other in English ===
- Mina Loy, Lunar Baedecker, English-born poet living and published in Paris
- W. B. Yeats, The Cat and the Moon, including "Leda and the Swan", Irish poet published in the United Kingdom

== Works published in other languages ==
=== France ===
- Antonin Artaud, Tric-trac du ciel, Paris: Galerie Simon
- Jean Cocteau, Plain-Chant
- Francis Jammes:
  - La Brebis égarée
  - Livres des quatrains, published each year from 1922 to 1925
- Alphonse Métérié, Le Cahier noir
- Tristan Tzara, pen name of Sami Rosenstock, De nos oiseaux

=== Indian subcontinent ===
Including all of the British colonies that later became India, Pakistan, Bangladesh, Sri Lanka and Nepal. Listed alphabetically by first name, regardless of surname:

==== Telugu language ====
- Bahar-e-Gulshan-e-Kashmir, anthology of traditional Kashmiri poetry, mostly the vatsans and ghazals of Mahmood Gami
- Pendyalu Venkatasubrahmanya Shastri, critical account of the Mahabharata and its interpretation (second edition published in 1933), Telugu-language criticism
- Penumarti Venkataratnam, Sandhya ragamu, romantic poems; a well-known work in the field of Telugu poetry

==== Other in India ====
- Seemab Akbarabadi, Naistaan, Urdu
- Bharati, Kuyil Pattu-Kannan Pattu-Parata Arupattaru, consists of three works, including Kuyil Pattu, written in 1912, a long narrative poem of 741 lines, written in the traditional Kalivenpa meter, called "a landmark in the field of modern Tamil poetry" by Sisir Kumar Das; Parati Arupattaru, 66-verse autobiographical work
- Chandra Kanta Agarwala, Binbaragi, 12 important poems about the past glory of Assam, ancient Assamese ballads strongly influenced the poems; Assamese language
- G. Sankara Kurup, Sahitya Kantukam, lyrical Malayalam poems modelled on those of Vallathol Narayana Menon, with original themes, context and diction; the author later published three other volumes with the same title
- Godavarish Mishra, Kisalaya, Oriya-language
- Imam Baksh Nasikh, Divan-i Nasikh, two volumes, Urdu
- Jhaverchand Meghani, Veninan Phool (Gujarati-language)
- Kumaran Asan, Karuna, based on the Buddhist legend of Vasavadatta and Upagupta; the author's last poem and an extremely popular one; celebrates compassion (karuna), Malayalam language
- Mahananda Sapkota, Manalahari, Nepali language
- Manishankar Bhatt "Kant", Purvalap, a work with a conspicuous romantic mood and classical diction, considered a landmark of Gujarati poetry, according to Sisir Kumar Das; published on the day the poet died
- Nagardas Amarjee Pandya, Rukmini-Harana, epic Sanskrit mahakavya on a mythological theme
- Puran Singh, Khulle Maidan, blank verse, Punjabi language
- Sarasvatibhai Bhide, editor, Abhinavakavyamala, Volume 5, Marathi-language anthology of modern women poets
- Sukumar Ray, Abol Tabol ("literally, "weird and random"), nonsense verse, Sisir Kumar Das has called it "one of the landmarks in the history of Bengali literature for children"
- Yatindranath Sengupta, Maricika, known for their innovative rhythm and imagery in Bengali poetry, very different from the followers of Rabindranath Tagore

=== Spain ===
- Juan Ramón Jiménez:
  - Belleza ("Beauty")
  - Poesía ("Poetry")
- Pedro Salinas, Presagios ("Presages")

=== Other languages ===
- Otto Gelsted, Reklameskibet ("The Show Boat"), Denmark
- Enrique González Rojo, Sr., El puerto y otros poemas, Mexico
- Sir Muhammad Iqbal, Payam-i-Mashriq (Message from the East), philosophical poetry in Persian
- Vladislav Khodasevich, Heavy Lyre, Russian poet published in Germany
- Hendrik Marsman, Verzen, Netherlands
- Vladimir Mayakovsky, About That, Soviet Russia
- Pablo Neruda, Crepusculario ("Book of Twilights"), Chile
- Rainer Maria Rilke, Duino Elegies and Sonnets to Orpheus, Austria
- J. Slauerhoff, Archipel ("Archipelago"), Netherlands
- David Vogel, Lifney Hasha'ar Ha'afel ("Before the Dark Gate"), Hebrew language, published in Vienna, the only book of poems published in the author's lifetime

== Awards and honors ==
- Nobel Prize in Literature (International): William Butler Yeats
- Pulitzer Prize for Poetry (United States): Edna St. Vincent Millay, The Ballad of the Harp-Weaver: A Few Figs from Thistles: Eight Sonnets in American Poetry, 1922. A Miscellany
- Georg Büchner Prize (Germany): Adam Karrillon, German physician, novelist and poet

== Births ==
Death years link to the corresponding "[year] in poetry" article:

- January 9 – David Holbrook (died 2011), English poet, novelist and academic
- January 13 – Pinkie Gordon Lane (died 2008), African American poet
- January 15 – Ivor Cutler (died 2006), Scottish poet, songwriter and humorist
- January 16 – Anthony Hecht (died 2004), American poet
- January 23 – John Logan (died 1987), American poet
- February 2 – James Dickey (died 1997), American poet and novelist
- February 4 – Cola Franzen (died 2018), American translator
- February 12 – Alan Dugan (died 2003), American poet
- March 18 – Ryūichi Tamura 田村隆 (died 1998), Japanese Shōwa period poet, essayist and translator of English-language novels and poetry
- March 21 – Nizar Qabbani (died 1998), Syrian diplomat, poet and publisher
- March 27 – Louis Simpson (died 2012), Jamaican-born American poet, winner of the 1964 Pulitzer Prize for Poetry
- March 30 – Milton Acorn (died 1986), Canadian poet, writer and playwright nicknamed "The People's Poet"
- April 3
  - Daniel Hoffman (died 2013), American poet, essayist and academic serving as Consultant in Poetry to the Library of Congress (a position later known as Poet Laureate Consultant in Poetry) from 1973 to 1974
  - John Ormond (died 1990), Welsh poet and journalist
- May 21 – Dorothy Hewett (died 2002), Australian feminist poet, playwright and novelist
- June 24 – Yves Bonnefoy (died 2002), French poet
- June 29 – Pablo García Baena (died 2018), Spanish poet
- July 2 – Wisława Szymborska (died 2012), Polish poet, essayist and translator, winner of the Nobel Prize in Literature in 1996
- July 16 – Mari Evans (died 2017), African-American poet, author, playwright, academic and television producer
- September 13 – Miroslav Holub (died 1998), Czech poet and immunologist
- September 22 – Dannie Abse (died 2014), Welsh poet and writer
- October 9 – Haim Gouri (died 2018), Israeli poet in Hebrew, novelist and documentary filmmaker
- October 24 – Denise Levertov (died 1997), English-born American poet
- November 9 – James Schuyler (died 1991), American poet and a central figure in the New York School
- November 22 – Tu An (蒋壁厚, Jiǎng Bìhoù; died 2017), Chinese poet and translator
- December 21 – Richard Hugo, born Richard Hogan (died 1982), American poet
- December 20 – Aco Šopov (died 1982) Macedonian poet
- Also – Nanao Sakaki (died 2008), Japanese poet and leading personality of "The Tribe" (Buzoko), a counter-cultural group (surname: Sakaki)

== Deaths ==
Birth years link to the corresponding "[year] in poetry" article:

- January 9 – Katherine Mansfield, 34 (born 1888), New Zealand-born poet and prominent Modernist writer of short fiction
- May – J. Brynach Davies (Brynach), c.50 (born 1873), Welsh poet and journalist
- June 15 – Maurice Hewlett, 62 (born 1861), English historical novelist, poet and essayist
- August 10 – Laura Redden Searing, 84 (born 1839), deaf American poet and journalist
- September 10 – Sukumar Ray, 35 (born 1887), Bengali humorous poet, short-story writer and playwright
- October 12 – John Cadvan Davies (Cadfan), 77 (born 1846), Welsh poet and hymn-writer
- December 15 – Frank Morton, 53 (born 1869), English-born Australian poet and journalist
- December 18 – Edna Dean Proctor, 94 (born 1829), American poet; occasional author of short sketches and stories

== See also ==
- Poetry
- List of poetry awards
- List of years in poetry
- New Objectivity in German literature and art
