= 1931 in poetry =

Nationality words link to articles with information on the nation's poetry or literature (for instance, Irish or France).

== Events ==
- Louis Zukofsky edits the February issue of Poetry magazine. The issue eventually will be recognized as the founding document of the Objectivist poets. It features poetry by Zukofsky, Charles Reznikoff, Carl Rakosi, George Oppen, Basil Bunting, William Carlos Williams, Kenneth Rexroth, and many others. Also in the issue: Zukofsky's essay "Sincerity and Objectification".
- George Oppen and his wife, Mary Oppen found To Publishers in Le Beausset, France; Louis Zukofsky is editor.
- Beacon magazine founded in Trinidad (lasts until 1933)

== Works published in English ==
=== Canada ===
- Wilson MacDonald, A Flagon Of Beauty. Toronto: Pine Tree Publishing.
- Marjorie Pickthall, The Naiad and Five Other Poems (Toronto: Ryerson)

=== India, in English ===
- A.R. Chida, editor, An Anthology of Indo-Anglian Verse with an Introductory Note to Each Set of Selections, Hyderabad: A. R. Chida, 113 pages; anthology; Indian poetry in English

=== United Kingdom ===
- John Betjeman, Mount Zion; or, In Touch with the Infinite
- Laurence Binyon, Collected Poems
- Edmund Blunden:
  - Themis
  - (editor) The Poems of Wilfred Owen
- Robert Bridges, Shorter Poems
- Roy Campbell, The Georgiad, a satire openly attacking the Bloomsbury Group; a South African native published in the United Kingdom
- C. Day-Lewis, From Feathers to Iron
- Lawrence Durrell, Quaint Fragments
- T. S. Eliot:
  - Coriolan
  - Triumphal March
- John Gawsworth
  - Confession: verses
  - Fifteen Poems: Three Friends
  - Snowballs
- Robert Graves, Poems 1926–1930
- Aldous Huxley:
  - The Cicadas, and Other Poems
  - The World of Light; A comedy, a verse drama performed March 30
- John Lehmann, A Garden Revisited, and Other Poems
- Æ, pen name of George William Russell, Vale, and Other Poems
- Osbert Sitwell, The Collected Satires and Poems
- William Soutar, Conflict
- Arthur Symons, Jezbel Mort, and Other Poems (sic)
- Humbert Wolfe, Snow

=== United States ===
- Franklin P. Adams, Christopher Columbus
- Conrad Aiken:
  - The Coming Forth by Day of Osris Jones
  - Preludes for Memnon
- E. E. Cummings, W (ViVa)
- H.D. (Hilda Doolittle), Red Roses for Bronze
- Langston Hughes, The Negro Mother
- Edna St. Vincent Millay, Fatal Interview
- Ogden Nash:
  - Free Wheeling
  - Hard Lines
- Dorothy Parker, Death and Taxes
- Edward Arlington Robinson, Mathias at the Door
- Wallace Stevens, Harmonium, including "Le Monocle de Mon Oncle", "The Comedian as the Letter C", "The Emperor of Ice Cream", "Thirteen Ways of Looking at a Blackbird", "Peter Quince at the Clavier", "Sunday Morning", "Sea Surface Full of Clouds" and "In the Clear Season of Grapes"), Knopf, revised from 1923 edition
- Mark Van Doren, Jonathan Gentry
- Yvor Winters, The Journey
- Gamel Woolsey, Middle Earth

=== Other in English ===
- Norman Cameron, Guianese Poetry: 1831–1931
- Kenneth Slessor, Harley Matthews and Colin Simpson, Trio: A Book of Poems, Sydney: Sunnybrook Press, Australia
- Gertrude Stein, Before the Flowers of Friendship Faded Friendship Faded: written on a poem by Georges Hugnet, American poet published in France

== Works published in other languages ==
=== France ===
- Guillaume Apollinaire, pen name of Wilhelm Apollinaris de Kostrowitzky, Le condor et le morpion, posthumously published (died 1918)
- Louis Aragon:
  - Hourra l'Oural, influenced by the author's conversion to Marxism
  - Persécuté Persécuteur
- André Breton, L'union libre
- Francis Jammes, L'Arc-en-ciel des amours, Paris: Bloud et Gay
- Pierre Jean Jouve, Les Noces
- Tristan Tzara, pen name of Sami Rosenstock, L'Homme approximatif

=== Indian subcontinent ===
Including all of the British colonies that later became India, Pakistan, Bangladesh, Sri Lanka and Nepal. Listed alphabetically by first name, regardless of surname:

- Atul Prasad Sen, Gitigunja, complete collection of songs by this Bengali poet and composer
- Bal Krisna Rav, Kaumudi, Indian, Hindi-language
- Bhagavadacharya, Mohanapancadhydyi, Sanskrit poem on Mahatma Gandhi
- Chanda Jha, Candra Padyavali, edited by Baladev Mishra, Maithili
- D. K. Kelkar, Kavyalocan, a treatise in Marathi on literary theory; discusses the nature of poetry, figures of speech, the nature of poetic pleasure and Indian literary concepts
- K. V. Simon, Veda Viharam, long poem based on the book of Genesis; India, Malayalam language
- Mahjoor, Nav Baharo Myani Locaro Ho, Kashmiri
- Mayadhar Mansinha, Dhupa, poems in this collection remained very popular as of the mid-1990s; Oriya
- Mohan Singh Diwana, Jagat Tamasa, Punjabi (a 1927 novel by Charan Singh Sahid has the same title)
- Raja K. K., Baspanjali, Malayalam work by a poet of the Vallathol school
- Siyaram Sharan Gupta, Atmostsarga, on the self-sacrifice of Ganesh Shankar Vidyarthi in the cause of communal peace; Hindi
- Tallapragada Visvasundaramma, Ratri, including many patriotic poems; Telugu
- Umashankar Joshi, Vishwashanti, also spelled "Visvasanti" (Indian, writing in Gujarati)
- V. Seetharamayya, Gitagalu, the author's first book of poetry, with navodaya lyrics more intellectual than most; Kannada

=== Spanish language ===
==== Spain ====
- Federico García Lorca, Poema del cante jondo ("Poem of Deep Song")
- Pedro Salinas, Fábula y signo ("Fable and Sign")
- José Moreno Villa, Carambas

==== Latin America ====
- Enrique Peña Barrenechea, Cinema de los sentidos puros, Peru
- Vicente Huidobro, Altazor, Chilean poet published in Spain

=== Other languages ===
- Vladimir Mayakovsky, Кем Быть (Kem byt'?, "Whom Shall I Become?"), Soviet Russia, published posthumously, for children
- Giorgos Seferis, Στροφή ("Strophe") (Greece)

== Awards and honors ==
- Pulitzer Prize for Poetry: Robert Frost: Collected Poems

== Births ==
Death years link to the corresponding "[year] in poetry" article:

- January 6
  - Juan Goytisolo (died 2017), Spanish poet, essayist and novelist
  - P. J. Kavanagh (died 2015), English poet, lecturer, actor and broadcaster
- January 14 – Ahmed Faraz, pseudonym of Syed Ahmad Shah (died 2008), Pakistani Urdu-language poet, son of Agha Syed Muhammad Shah Bark Kohati, a leading traditional poet
- February 2 – Judith Viorst, American author known for her children's books and poetry
- February 16 – Makoto Ōoka 大岡信 (died 2017), Japanese poet and literary critic
- April 9 – Gerard Benson (died 2014), English poet
- April 15 – Tomas Tranströmer (died 2015), Swedish writer, poet and translator
- April 19 – Etheridge Knight (died 1991), African-American poet
- May 2 – Ruth Fainlight, American poet, short story writer, translator and librettist
- May 16 – Peter Levi (died 2000), English poet, professor of poetry at the University of Oxford, Jesuit priest, archaeologist, travel writer, biographer, scholar, prolific reviewer and critic
- May 27 – O. N. V. Kurup (died 2016), Indian, Malayalam-language poet
- June 5 – James Fenton (died 2021), Northern Irish Ulster Scots dialect poet
- June 6 – Kiki Dimoula, Greek poet (died 2020)
- June 7 – Okot p'Bitek (died 1982), Ugandan poet
- June 13 – Jay Macpherson (died 2012), Canadian lyric poet and scholar; she is a member of the "mythopoeic school of poetry"
- June 20 – Urszula Kozioł (died 2025), Polish poet, writer, and dramatist
- June 21 – Patricia Goedicke (died 2006), American poet
- July 29 – C. Narayana Reddy (died 2017), Indian poet
- July 28 – Alan Brownjohn, English poet and novelist
- August 11 – Delia Domínguez (died 2022), Chilean poet
- September 30 – Jansug Charkviani (died 2017), Georgian poet and politician
- November 8 – Jack Collom (died 2017), American poet
- December 15 – Shuntarō Tanikawa 谷川 俊太郎, Japanese poet and translator (surname: Tanikawa)
- Unknown date – Sonja Dunn, Canadian poet

== Deaths ==
Birth years link to the corresponding "[year] in poetry" article:

- March 16 – Harold Edward Monro, 54, British poet, proprietor of the Poetry Bookshop in London
- March 31 – Puran Singh (born 1881), Indian, writing Indian poetry in English
- April 2 – Katharine Tynan, 70 (born 1861), Irish poet, novelist and writer who, after her marriage in 1898, usually wrote under the names "Katharine Tynan Hinkson", "Katharine Tynan-Hinkson" or "Katharine Hinkson-Tynan"
- April 10 – Khalil Gibran, 48, poet, artist and writer born in Lebanon who spent much of his productive life in the United States
- November 19 – Xu Zhimo, 34 (born 1897), Chinese poet, in aviation accident
- December 5 – (Nicholas) Vachel Lindsay, 42 (born 1879), American poet and early advocate of jazz poetry, suicide by poison

== See also ==
- Poetry
- List of poetry awards
- List of years in poetry
- New Objectivity in German literature and art
- Oberiu movement in Russian art and poetry
