= 1797 in poetry =

Nationality words link to articles with information on the nation's poetry or literature (for instance, Irish or France).

== Events ==
- June 5 – Samuel Taylor Coleridge, living at Nether Stowey in the Quantock Hills, renews his friendship with William Wordsworth and Wordsworth's sister, Dorothy, who take a house nearby.
- August – The British Home Office sends an agent to Nether Stowey to investigate Coleridge and Wordsworth who are suspected of being French spies.
- October – Coleridge composes Kubla Khan in an opium-induced dream and writes down only a fragment of it on waking.
- November – Wordsworth suggests to Coleridge the theme of The Rime of the Ancient Mariner on a walk in the Quantocks.
- William Blake illustrates Edward Young's Night-Thoughts.

== Works published ==
=== United Kingdom ===
- Samuel Taylor Coleridge, Poems ... Second Edition
- William Drennan, The Wake of William Orr
- George Dyer, The Poet's Fate
- Alexander Pope, The Works of Alexander Pope, edited by Joseph Warton, posthumous
- Charlotte Smith, Elegiac Sonnets, and Other Poems, Volume 2, sequel to Elegiac Sonnets 1784
- Elizabeth Sophia Tomlins and Sir Thomas Edlyne Tomlins, Tributes of Affection by a Lady and her Brother
- Mary Wollstonecraft, "On Poetry, and Our Relish for the Beauties of Nature", Monthly Magazine (April 1797), criticism

=== United States ===
- Sarah Wentworth Morton, publishing under the name "Philenia", Beacon Hill: A Local Poem, Historic and Descriptive, on the American Revolution; conventional verse in neoclassical form
- Robert Treat Paine Jr. "The Ruling Passion", the Harvard Phi Beta Kappa poem for this year

== Works wrongly dated this year ==
- Robert Southey, Poems, actually published in 1796, although the title page states "1797"

== Births ==
Death years link to the corresponding "[year] in poetry" article:

- January 10 – Annette von Droste-Hülshoff (died 1848), German
- March 27 – Alfred de Vigny (died 1863), French poet, playwright and novelist
- August 30 – Mary Shelley, née Godwin (died 1851), English novelist, short story writer, dramatist, essayist, biographer, travel writer and poet
- October 13 – William Motherwell (died 1835), Scottish
- December 13 – Heinrich Heine (died 1856), German
- December 27 – Mirza Ghalib (died 1869), Indian classical Urdu and Persian poet
- Also:
  - James Wallis Eastburn (died 1819), American
  - George Moses Horton (died 1883), African-American

== Deaths ==
Birth years link to the corresponding "[year] in poetry" article:

- March 18 – Friedrich Wilhelm Gotter (born 1746), German poet and dramatist
- April 7 – William Mason (born 1724), English poet, editor and gardener
- June 28 – George Keate (born 1729), English poet and writer
- Also:
  - Joseph Friedrich Engelschall (born 1739), German poet
  - Wang Zhenyi (born 1768), Chinese Qing dynasty female poet and astronomer
  - Yuan Mei (born 1716), Chinese Qing dynasty poet, scholar, artist and gastronome
  - Molla Panah Vagif (born 1717), Azerbaijani poet

== See also ==
- Poetry
