= Sushil Kumar De =

Indian polymath and author (1890–1978)

- Born: 29 January 1890; Calcutta, Bengal Presidency, British India
- Died: 31 January 1978 (aged 88)
- Occupations: Writer, scholar, professor

Academic background
- Education: Presidency College

Sushil Kumar De (29 January 1890 – 31 January 1968) was a Bengali writer from the early decades of the 20th century. Trained as a lawyer, with degrees in English and Sanskrit poetics, he wrote extensively on Sanskrit literature, philosophy, poetics, and the history of Bengali literature, besides editing critical editions for a large number of Sanskrit and Bengali texts from manuscripts.

He was a professor of English literature at Calcutta University, and of Sanskrit and Bengali at Dhaka University. While at the latter post, he accumulated a large collection of palm-leaf manuscripts.

== Life and career ==
Sushil De was born in Calcutta in 1890. His father, Satish Chandra De, was a state surgeon, posted at Cuttack, Orissa, where he did his schooling at the Ravenshaw Collegiate School. Subsequently, he did his Intermediate and B.A. from Presidency College and M.A. in English from Calcutta University, and received the Premchand Roychand Scholarship. In 1912, he completed his law degree from the University Law College, but instead of practising, he joined as a lecturer in English at Presidency College and later at Calcutta University. In 1921, he did his D.Litt. from the University of London (School of Oriental Studies) with a thesis on rhetoric (alaMkAra) in Sanskrit poetry. He also studied linguistics at the University of Bonn.

Upon return to India, he joined Dhaka University, initially in English, and then in the Sanskrit and Bengali departments. Subsequent to his retirement from Dhaka University in 1947, he also headed Jadavpur's Bengali department.

In 1951, he was a visiting professor at the University of London.

His work on the history of the Vaishnava movement in Bengal, along with critical manuscript analyses of several original texts, are very well respected.

He also published a brief note on erotics in Sanskrit literature.

He was well known in Oriental study circles, and was elected General President of the All-India Oriental Conference, 1949. A fellow of the Royal Asiatic Society of Great Britain and Ireland (1954), he edited the Udyoga Parva (1940) and Drona Parva (1958) volumes in the Critical Edition of the Mahabharata from the Bhandarkar Oriental Research Institute.

At the same time, he was also active in Bangla literature, publishing a volume of Bangla sonnets Dipali, focusing on physical love (1928), and prAktani (1934) on characters from classical Sanskrit literature. He was president of the Bangiya Sahitya Parishad (1950, 1956), and also wrote several popular translations of Sanskrit tales.

=== Works ===
- Bengal Literature in the Nineteenth Century (1919)
- Studies in the History of Sanskrit Poetics (Two parts, 1923, 1925)
- the prose kAvyas of daNDin, subandhu and bANa (1941)
- Early History of Vaisnava Faith and Movement in Bengal (1942–1986)
- Dasgupta, S. N.; De, Sushil Kumar (1947). A History Of Sanskrit Literature Classical Period Vol I. Osmania University, Digital Library Of India. University Of Calcutta.
- Dinabandhu Mitra (1951)
- Bangla Prabad (Bangla Proverbs) (1952)
- Nana Nibandha (Bangla Articles), (1953)
- Ancient Indian erotics and erotic literature (1959)
- Some Problems of Sanskrit Poetics (1959)
- Sanskrit Poetics as a Study of Aesthetics (1963)

Critical editions from manuscripts:

- Padyavali of Rupa Goswami (1934)
- Meghaduta of Kalidasa (1959).
