= 1877 in poetry =

Nationality words link to articles with information on the nation's poetry or literature (for instance, Irish or France).

== Events ==
=== The Annus mirabilis of poetastery ===
In the annals of poetasting, 1877 stands out as a historic year.

The most startling incident in my life was the time I discovered myself to be a poet, which was in the year 1877.

So wrote William Topaz McGonagall (1825 –1902) a Scottish weaver, "actor", and "poet" who would become comically renowned as one of the worst poets in the English language.

Also this year Poetaster Julia A. Moore, following up on the renown of her first book of verse, The Sweet Singer of Michigan Salutes the Public of 1876, decided to appear before her public. She gave a reading and singing performance, with orchestral accompaniment, at a Grand Rapids, Michigan, opera house.

Moore managed to interpret the jeering as criticism of the orchestra.

== Works published in English ==
=== United Kingdom ===
- William Allingham, Songs, Ballads, and Stories
- William Johnson Cory, published anonymously, Ionica II (see also Ionica 1858)
- Austin Dobson, Proverbs in Porcelain
- John Abraham Heraud, Uxmal; Macee de Leodepart
- Gerard Manley Hopkins, "The Windhover", written but not published until 1918
- Edward Lear, Laughable Lyrics: Fourth Book of Nonsense Poems, Songs, Botany, Music, &c., including "The Dong with a Luminous Nose", "The Courtship of the Yonghy-Bonghy-Bò", "The Pobble Who Has No Toes", "The Quangle Wangle's Hat" and "The Akond of Swat", published December 1876, although book states "1877"
- George Moore, Flowers of Passion, published this year, although book states "1878"
- William Morris, The Story of Sigurd the Volsung and the Fall of the Niblungs
- Coventry Patmore, published anonymously, The Unknown Eros, and Other Odes, odes 1–31; a second, expanded edition was published under Patmore's name in 1878

=== United States ===
- Thomas Bailey Aldrich, Flower and Thorn
- Oliver Wendell Holmes, Poetical Works
- Sidney Lanier, Poems
- James Russell Lowell, Three Memorial Poems
- Edmund Clarence Stedman, Hawthorne and Other Poems

== Works published in other languages ==
- Giosuè Carducci, Barbarian Odes, Book 1, Italy
- Holger Drachmann, Denmark:
  - Sange ved Havet ("Songs by the Sea")
  - Derovre fra grænsen ("Over the Frontier there"), prose work, with interludes in verse, a series of impressions made on the poet by a visit to the scenes of the war with Germany
- Victor Hugo, France:
  - L'Art d'être grand-père
  - La Légende des siècles, second series (first series 1859, third series 1883)
- Stéphane Mallarmé – Poésies, France
- Rahman Baba (died 1706), Dīwān (collection), India, Pashto language, first printed version

== Births ==
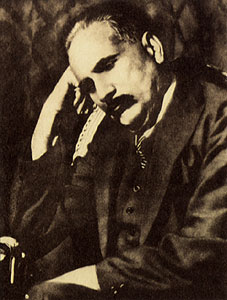
Muhammad Iqbal

Death years link to the corresponding "[year] in poetry" article:

- January 20 – Ștefan Petică (died 1904), Romanian Symbolist poet and writer
- February 7 – Alfred Williams (died 1930), English "hammerman poet"
- March 16 – Nanalal Dalpatram Kavi (નાનાલાલ દલપતરામ કવિ), full name: Nanalal Dapatram Kavi (died 1946), Indian, Gujarati-language author and poet; son of Kavishwar Dalpatram (1820-1898)
- April 2 – Richard Rowley (died 1947), Irish poet and writer
- April 24 – Marcel Noppeney (died 1966), Luxembourg French-language poet
- May 28 – Oscar Milosz, also known as O(scar) V(ladislas) de L(ubicz-)Milosz (died 1939), Lithuanian diplomat, later a French citizen, also a fiction writer, playwright, poet and essayist; a cousin of Czeslaw Milosz, on whom he exerted a great influence
- June 6 – Ulloor S. Parameswara Iyer ഉള്ളൂര് എസ്. പരമേശ്വരയ്യര് (died 1949), Indian, Malayalam-language poet, scholar and government official, author of a five-volume history of Malayalam literature
- June 11 – Renée Vivien, born Pauline Mary Tarn (died 1909), English-born French-language Symbolist poet
- July 15 – Nina Salaman, born Paulina Ruth Davis (died 1925), English poet noted for her translations from medieval Hebrew poetry
- August 15 – Stanley Vestal (died 1957), American writer, poet and historian
- November 9 – Sir Muhammad Iqbal (aka "Allama Iqbal" [Urdu], and "Iqbal-e-Lahori" [Persian]; died 1938) Indian Muslim poet, philosopher and politician, writing in Persian and Urdu, praised as Muffakir-e-Pakistan ("The Thinker of Pakistan"), Shair-i-Mashriq ("The Poet of the East"), and Hakeem-ul-Ummat ("The Sage of Ummah"); his birthday is annually commemorated in Pakistan as "Iqbal Day", a national holiday
- November 22 – Endre Ady (died 1919), Hungarian poet

== Deaths ==
Birth years link to the corresponding "[year] in poetry" article:

- July 14 – Richard Davies (Mynyddog) (born 1833), Welsh poet
- August 5 – Robert Williams (Trebor Mai) (born 1830), Welsh poet
- August 30 – Toru Dutt, 21 (born 1856), Indian poet, novelist and translator writing in English, of pulmonary tuberculosis
- Maqbool Shah Kralawari (born 1820), Indian, Kashmiri-language poet

== See also ==
- 19th century in poetry
- 19th century in literature
- List of years in poetry
- List of years in literature
- Victorian literature
- French literature of the 19th century
- Poetry
