= Annie Wall Barnett =

American writer (1859–1942)

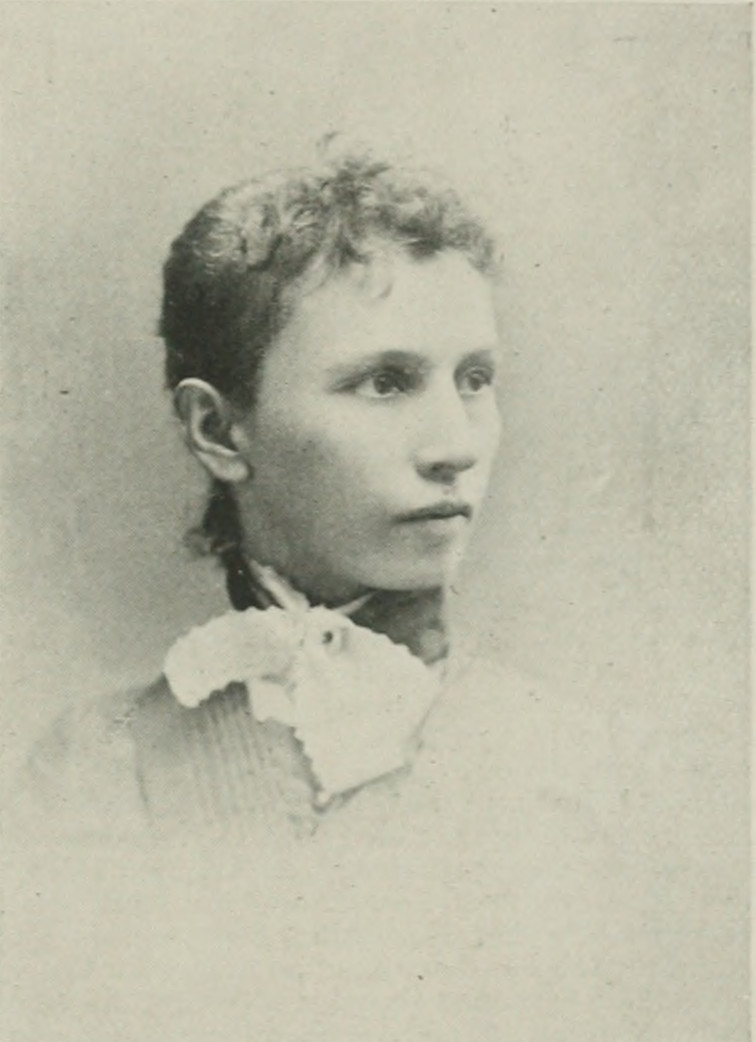
- "A Woman of the Century"
- Born: Annie Carpenter; September 19, 1859 Crawford County, Wisconsin or Richland County, Wisconsin
- Died: September 3/4, 1942 Modesto, California, U.S.
- Occupation: writer; poet; litterateur
- Spouse: Burton T. Wall (m. 1878) Mr. Barnett (m. ?)
- Children: Norma Ruth Wall

Annie Wall Barnett (née, Annie Carpenter; after first marriage, Annie Carpenter Wall; later, Annie Wall Barnett; September 19, 1859 – September 3/4, 1942) was an American writer, litterateur, and poet. She was considered to be among the leading poets of the Western United States.

== Biography ==
Annie Carpenter was born in either Richland County, Wisconsin or Crawford County, Wisconsin, September 19, 1859. Her father, J. B. Carpenter, a farmer, was suddenly killed when Annie was three years old. After his death, she lived for about three years with her maternal grandmother in Richmond, Walworth County, Wisconsin. Mrs. Carpenter married again in 1865, and Annie went home to live in Crawford County, until she was twelve years old.

Carpenter's health would not permit school attendance but a portion of the time, and she was educated largely at home.

When twelve years old, upon removing with her mother's family to Grant County, Wisconsin., she was well advanced, and when seventeen, was offered a position as teacher.

Carpenter's first poem was published when she was fourteen years old. She wrote regularly for a few years for Farm and Fireside, and most regularly for the Chicago Sun and Milwaukee Sentinel, as well as many other papers. She wrote for the Pueblo, Colorado, Press for nearly a year, until failing health prevented regular literary work. For more than 40 years, she contributed to The Montfort Mail of Montfort, Wisconsin.

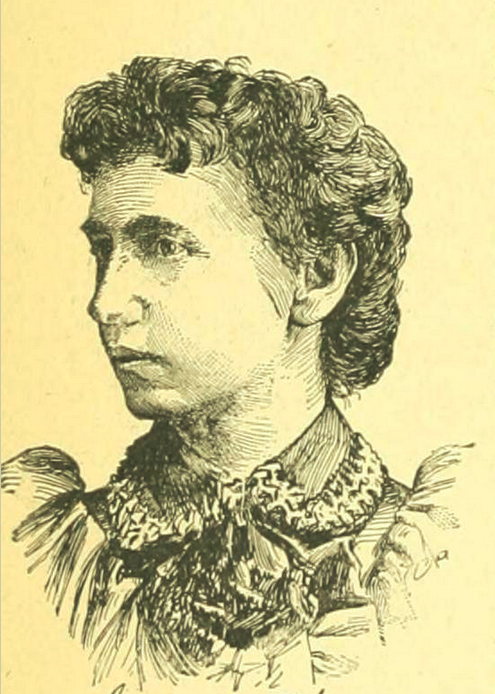
1894

On June 12, 1878, she married Burton T. Wall, of Marion, Indiana. His father, Rev. Alson R. Wall (d. 1907), was actively engaged in ministerial work as a Quaker for over 40 years. Mr. and Mrs. Burton Wall had three children, including Norma Ruth Wall (1891–1964) and two who died in infancy.

In 1884, Annie Wall, now of Montfort, Wisconsin, had written a number of poems in the previous few months which attracted attention in literary circles, and were said to be equal if not superior to any of the productions of Ella Wheeler Wilcox, and which entitled her to a place among the leading poets of the American West. In the same year, her failing health determined them to remove to Pueblo, Colorado, where her husband engaged in mercantile business, and Mrs. Wall divided her time between her artistic, literary, and domestic duties. By 1899, the family was living in Pueblo, Colorado for the benefit of Annie Wall's health. Some Scattered Leaves, a volume of poetry, was published in 1893. Her ability as an artist enabled her to illustrate her own poems in this book, and in a ribbon-tied booklet of Christmas poems.

In 1905, Annie Wall was living in Red Bluff, California.

By 1915, she was known as Annie Wall Barnett and was living in Patterson, California, where, in November, she underwent a surgical procedure in her home. In August 1919, at the Patterson Fair, Annie Barnett received First premium award on poem and hills of Patterson, nature sketch and painting in oil, as well as Second premium for oil painting, nature sketch of peach.

Annie Wall Barnett died in Maestro hospital, Modesto, California, September 4, 1942. (Note: According to Family Search, Barnett died September 3, 1942.)

== Selected works ==
- Some Scattered Leaves, 1893
