= Frank Oliver Call =

Canadian poet and academic

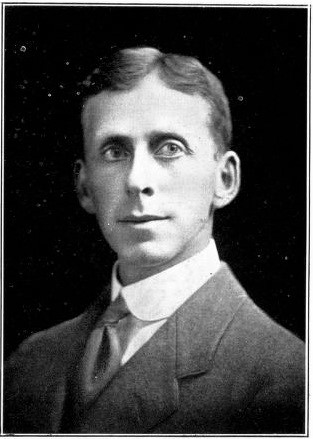
- Born: April 11, 1878; West Brome, Quebec
- Died: September 7, 1956 (aged 78); Knowlton, Quebec
- Occupations: poet, travel writer, professor
- Writing career
- Period: 1910s–1940s
- Notable works: Acanthus and Wild Grape, Sonnets for Youth, Blue Homespun

Frank Oliver Call (April 11, 1878 – September 7, 1956) was a Canadian poet, painter and academic.

Born in Brome Lake, Quebec, Call was educated at Bishop's University in Paris and Marburg and at McGill University, and was subsequently a professor of languages at Bishop's and McGill.

His publications as a poet included In a Belgian Garden (1916), Acanthus and Wild Grape (1920), Blue Homespun (1924) and Sonnets for Youth (1944). Acanthus and Wild Grape, his most famous work, was divided in two sections: Acanthus followed more traditional Victorian poetic styles, while Wild Grape was written as free verse. As a result of that work, Call is seen as a bridge between early Canadian poets such as Bliss Carman, Archibald Lampman and Duncan Campbell Scott, and the modernist work of later poets such as E. J. Pratt and Dorothy Livesay. More recent analysis has also concentrated on homoerotic themes in some of his writing, particularly in Sonnets for Youth, although there is not currently sufficient biographical evidence to confirm whether Call ever actually identified as gay.

In addition to writing poetry, Call published two volumes of travel writing, The Spell of French Canada (1926) and The Spell of Acadia (1930), and a biography of Marguerite Bourgeoys.

Call won the Quebec Literary Competition Award in 1924 for Blue Homespun. In addition, he was involved in Canadian Poetry Magazine, the Canadian Authors Association and PEN Canada.

He died at Knowlton, Quebec, in 1956.
