= John Askham =

John Askham (1825–1894) was an English working class poet who published five volumes of poetry.

== Life ==
Askham was born at Wellingborough, Northamptonshire, on 20 or 25 July 1825. His father, John Askham, a native of Raunds in Northamptonshire, was a shoemaker, and his mother a native of Kimbolton. John Askham the younger was the youngest of seven children, and attended the Wellingborough Free School for about one year. He was twice married; he and his first wife (born Bonham) had three daughters.

Before Askham reached the age of ten, his family put him to work in the shoemaking trade. After working a while for the sewing machine company of Singers & Co., he set up his own shoemaking business. He became known locally as "the shoemaker poet". He later became the librarian of the newly formed Literary Institute at Wellingborough. In 1871, Askham was elected a member of the first town school board, and in 1874 he became school attendance officer and sanitary inspector of the local board of health.

Educating himself, Askham started writing poetry. He composed his first verses at the age 25, prompted by a Chartist workmate, though he himself was not so political; and later contributed poems to local newspapers. George James De Wilde, editor of the Northampton Mercury, befriended him and gave him work as a correspondent.

Askham was especially fond of the sonnet form. Unlike John Clare (1793-1864), an early influence, he did not live a country life.

In his later years, Askham was disabled by paralysis. He died at Clare Cottage, Wellingborough, on 28 October 1894, and was buried on 1 November in Wellingborough cemetery. He was survived by his second daughter.

== Works ==
Askham published four volumes by subscription, and through one of his subscribers, George Ward Hunt, he received a grant of £50 from the Queen's Bounty Fund. His works were:

- Sonnets on the Months and other Poems. Northampton: Taylor & Son, 1863.
- Descriptive Poems; Miscellaneous Pieces: Scriptural, Descriptive, Biographical; and Miscellaneous Sonnets. London: F. Warne; Northampton: Taylor & Son, 1866.
- Judith and other Poems; and a Centenary of Sonnets. London: F. Warne; Northampton: Taylor & Son, 1868.
- Poems and Sonnets: Descriptive, Miscellaneous and Special. London: F. Warne, 1875.
- Sketches in Prose and Verse. Northampton: S. S. Campion, 1893.
