= Kitamura Tokoku =

Japanese literary critic and poet (1868–1894)

Kitamura Tōkoku
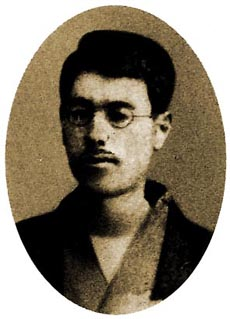
- Born: 29 December 1868; Odawara, Kanagawa, Japan
- Died: 16 May 1894 (aged 25); Tokyo, Japan
- Occupation: Writer
- Writing career
- Literary movement: Romanticism

Kitamura Tōkoku (北村 透谷; 29 December 1868 – 16 May 1894) was the pen name of Kitamura Montarō (北村門太郎), a Japanese poet and essayist. He was one of the founders of the modern Japanese romantic literary movement. Before dawn on 16 May 1894, Tokoku hanged himself in his garden at his home near Shiba Park in Tokyo. His grave is at the temple of Zuisho-ji in Shirokane, Tokyo.

== Biography ==
=== Early life ===
From a samurai-class family of Ashigarashimo District, Kanagawa, Kitamura was interested in liberal politics at an early age, and played a minor role in the Freedom and People's Rights Movement. He attended the Tōkyō Senmon Gakkō (which later became Waseda University), but was expelled due to his radical political views. After almost a year of vigorous political activities he started questioning the purpose of the movement and left to become a writer. In 1888, he was baptized as a Christian, and married Ishizaka Mina.

=== Literary career ===
Kitamura self-published the long verse Soshū no shi ("The Poem of the Prisoner") in 1888, which was the longest Japanese poem written in free verse up until that time. He followed this with the poetic drama Hōrai kyoku ("The Drama of Mount Hōrai"). He claimed to be influenced by the works of Byron, Emerson and Carlyle. His wife's Christianity also greatly influenced his outlook.

Kitamura turned from poetry to essays, and wrote works extolling the "life-espousing views" of the West, over the "life-denying view" of Buddhism and traditional Japanese Shinto thought. His attempts to explore the nature of the self and the potential for the individual, particularly in his seminal work Naibu seimei ron ("Theory of Inner Life"), are regarded by some as the starting point of modern Japanese literature. Kitamura was also drawn to the Quaker movement, and founded a pacifist society, the Japan Peace Association (日本平和会), in 1889.

Kitamura was hired as an English teacher at the Friends Girls School in 1890. He frequented the Azabu Christian Church. In 1893, he took over the post held by Shimazaki Tōson at Meiji Girls School (now Meiji Gakuin University). He also submitted literary criticism to the magazine Bungakukai, which he helped launch with Shimazaki Tōson in 1893. Around this time he began to show signs of mental instability and depression.

Kitamura authored the Bungakukai article The Evils of Blind Faith (頑執盲排の弊, Ganshūmōhai no hei), in which he ridiculed, among other things, the kokugaku movement, which by the time of its near-extinction in the late 19th century had evolved into a form of Shinto fundamentalism. He was a close associate of Shimazaki Tōson, whom he strongly influenced towards the romantic literary movement and whose father Shimazaki Masaki is noted for his involvement in kokugaku circles.

Before dawn on 16 May 1894, Tokoku hanged himself in his garden at his home near Shiba Park in Tokyo. His grave is at the temple of Zuisho-ji in Shirokane, Tokyo.
