= 1872 in poetry =

This article covers 1872 in poetry. Nationality words link to articles with information on the nation's poetry or literature (for instance, Irish or France).

== Events ==
- First printed version of the Thai epic Khun Chang Khun Phaen.

== Works published in English ==
=== United Kingdom ===
- Alfred Austin, Interludes
- Robert Browning, Fifine at the Fair
- C. S. Calverley, published anonymously, Fly Leaves
- Samuel Ferguson, Congal
- W. S. Gilbert, More "Bab" Balads (see also "Bab" Ballads 1869)
- Edward Lear, More Nonsense, Pictures, Rhymes, Botany, etc.
- Winwood Reade, The Martyrdom of Man
- Christina Rossetti, Sing-Song, book of nursery rhymes
- Alfred Lord Tennyson, Gareth and Lynette (see also Idylls of the King 1859, The Holy Grail 1869, Idylls of the King 1870, 1889, "The Last Tournament" 1871, "Balin and Balan" in Tiresias 1885),

=== United States ===
- Thomas Gold Appleton, Faded Leaves
- Paul Hamilton Hayne, Legends and Lyrics
- Oliver Wendell Holmes, The Poet at the Breakfast-Table, a book that combines fiction and nonfiction prose, together with poetry
- Albert Pike, Hymns to the Gods
- Celia Thaxter, Poems
- John Greenleaf Whittier, The Pennsylvania Pilgrim, United States

=== Other in English ===
- Alfred Domett, Ranolf and Amohia, epic poem in a Maori setting, New Zealand
- Henry Wadsworth Longfellow, Three Books of Song

== Works published in other languages ==
=== France ===
- François Coppée:
  - Les Bijoux de la delivrance, short verse drama inspired by the Franco-Prussian War; France
  - Les Humbles
- Victor Hugo, L'Année terrible, France
- Catulle Mendès, La Part du roi, verse drama, a one-act comedy; France

=== Other languages ===
- Hilario Ascasubi, Obras completas ("Complete Works"), three volumes compiled by the author; Argentine author writing in Spanish
- Girolamo de Rada, Skënderbeu i pafat, begins publication, Arbëresh
- Holger Drachmann, Digte ("Poems"), Denmark
- José Hernández, Martín Fierro, the first part of an epic Spanish-language Argentine poem in which the hero defends his way of life against encroaching socialization and civilization; an example of the Gaucho literature movement in South America (second part 1879)
- Michel Rodange, Renert odder de Fuuss am Frack an a Maansgréisst, Luxembourg

== Births ==
Death years link to the corresponding "[year] in poetry" article:

- February 22 – John Shaw Neilson (died 1942), Australian
- June 27 – Paul Laurence Dunbar (died 1906), African American
- July 8 – Sasaki Nobutsuna 佐佐木信綱 (died 1963), Japanese, Shōwa period tanka poet and scholar of the Nara and Heian periods (surname: Sasaki)
- August 15 – Sri Aurobindo (Bengali: শ্রী অরবিন্দ Sri Ôrobindo) (died 1950), Indian nationalist, poet, Yogi and spiritual Guru writing mostly in English
- October 10 – Arthur Talmage Abernethy (died 1956), American poet, journalist, theologian and minister; North Carolina Poet Laureate 1948–1953
- October 18 (October 6 O.S.) – Mikhail Kuzmin (died 1936), Russian poet, novelist and composer
- November 7 – Leonora Speyer (died 1956), American poet and violinist
- November 30 – John McCrae (died on active service in World War I 1918), Canadian war poet, physician, author, artist and soldier best known for the poem "In Flanders Fields"
- December 6 – Arthur Henry Adams (died 1936), Australian
- Also:
  - Hafiz Ibrahim (died 1932), Egyptian poet called "the poet of the Nile"
  - Divakarla Tirupti Shastri (died 1920), Indian, Telugu-language poet; one of the two poets in the due known in Telugu literature as "Triupati Vankata Kavulu"

== Deaths ==
Birth years link to the corresponding "[year] in poetry" article:

- January 21 – Franz Grillparzer (born 1791), Austrian dramatic poet
- March 20 – William Wentworth (born 1790), Australian
- March 31 – Samuel Henry Dickson (born 1798), American poet, physician, writer and educator
- September 2 – N. F. S. Grundtvig (born 1783), Danish
- October 15 – Handrij Zejler (born 1804), Sorbian
- December 24 – William Rankine (born 1820), Scottish physicist and engineer
- Also:
  - Henry Howard Brownell (born 1820), American poet and historian

== See also ==
- 19th century in poetry
- 19th century in literature
- List of years in poetry
- List of years in literature
- Victorian literature
- French literature of the 19th century
- Poetry
