= Alphonse Métérié =

French poet (1887–1967)

- Born: Alphonse Louis Marie Métérié; 17 September 1887; Amiens, France
- Died: 30 April 1967 (aged 79); Lausanne, Switzerland
- Occupation: Poet

Alphonse Métérié (17 September 1887 – 30 April 1967) was a 20th-century French poet who was awarded twice a prize by the Académie française; the Prix Georges Dupau in 1951 and the Prix Auguste Capdeville in 1957 for all his work.

== Works ==
- 1910: Carnet, 1910
- 1918: Le Poilu et la Princesse
- 1922: Le Livre des sœurs
- 1923: Le Cahier noir
- 1929: Nocturnes
- 1929: Petit Maroc
- 1934: Cophetuesques
- 1934: Petit Maroc deux
- 1944: Les Cantiques de Frère Michel
- 1946: Vétiver
- 1951: Proella ou le Second Livre des sœurs
- 1957: Éphémères

== Bibliography ==
- Urs Egli (1978). Le Cas Métérié. Lettera (in French). Lausanne: Éditions L'Âge d'Homme.
