= Benjamin Franklin King Jr. =

American writer

Benjamin Franklin King Jr
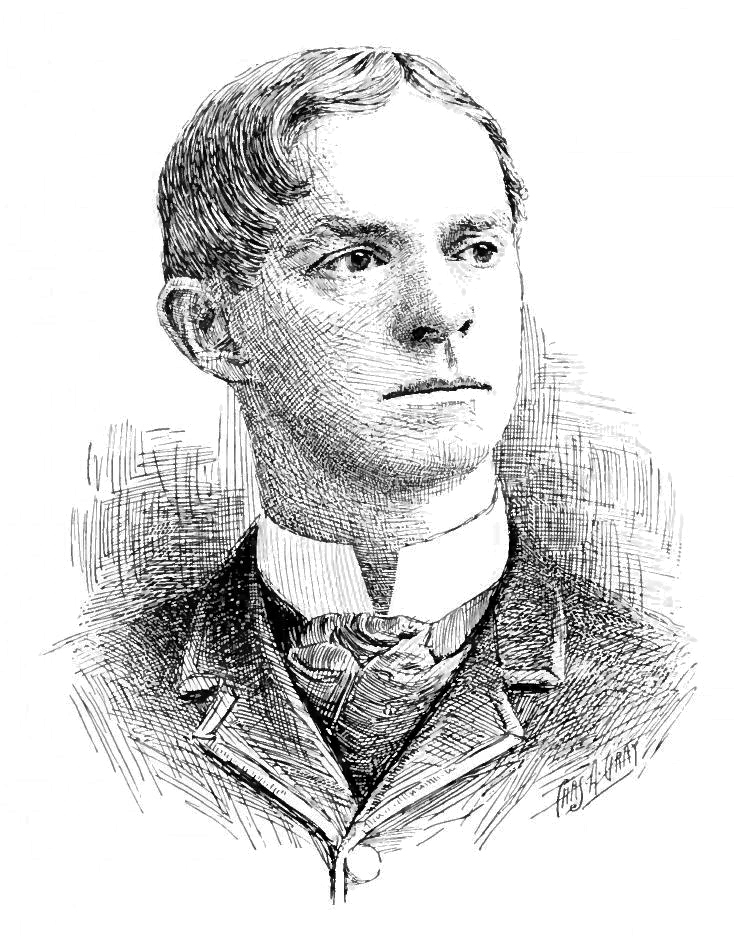
- Benjamin Franklin King Jr. by Chas A. Gray
- Born: Francis Henry King; March 17, 1857; St. Joseph, Michigan, U.S.
- Died: April 8, 1894 (aged 37); Bowling Green, Kentucky, U.S.
- Resting place: Saint Joseph City Cemetery; Saint Joseph, Michigan, U.S.
- Occupation: Poet
- Writing career
- Pen name: Ben King; Bow Hackley
- Genres: Poetry; Humour

Benjamin Franklin King Jr. (1857–1894) was an American humorist and poet whose work published under the names Ben King or the pseudonym Bow Hackley achieved notability in his lifetime and afterwards.

== Biography ==
King was born at St. Joseph, Michigan, March 17, 1857, and according to a short biography by Opie Read, as a child he was reputed a piano prodigy; in adult life he was by many deemed a failure for his lack of business instinct. But as "a poet, a gentle satirist and a humorist of the highest order, he achieved notability" in his short life for a series of newspaper published poems.

== Rise to fame ==
King billed himself as "Ben King, the Sweet Singer of St. Joe", and first came to prominence for a concert given during the World's Columbian Exposition. Introduced to the Press Club of Chicago, he was quickly picked up by Read, who invited King to tour with him, reading his poetry with piano accompaniment.

== Death ==
King died of an undisclosed illness while on a speaking tour at Bowling Green, Kentucky, April 8, 1894. As he had become a favorite of the Press Club of Chicago, that organization published a posthumous collection of his works titled Ben King's Verse in 1894, comparing him with Thomas Hood, a then-famous English humorist and poet. For the next quarter century, the book reputedly outsold any other single volume of verses in Michigan.

King was buried in the St. Joseph City, Michigan Cemetery. A monument later erected in Lake Bluff Park, Berrien County, Michigan in 1924 features a bronze bust of King created by Chicago sculptor Leonard Crunelle. On the granite monument base are lines from his poem "The River St. Joe":

Where the bumblebee sips and the clover's in bloom,
and the zephyr's come laden with peachblow perfume.
Where the thistle-down pauses in search of the rose
and the myrtle and woodbine and wild ivy grows;
Oh, give me the spot that I once used to know
by the side of the placid old River St. Joe!

== Personal life ==
He was married November 27, 1883 to Aseneth Belle Latham, of St. Joseph, Michigan, and the couple had two children, Bennett Latham King and Spencer P. King, aged nine and five, respectively, at the time of his death.
