= 1856 in poetry =

Nationality words link to articles with information on the nation's poetry or literature (for instance, Irish or France).

== Events ==
- Henry Wallis exhibits his romantic painting of The Death of Chatterton in London with the young poet and novelist George Meredith posing as his 18th-century predecessor Thomas Chatterton.

== Works published in English ==
=== United Kingdom ===
- Elizabeth Barrett Browning:
  - Aurora Leigh (first published November 15, dated 1857)
  - Poems (see also Poems 1844, 1850, 1853)
- Sydney Dobell, England in Time of War
- Edward Fitzgerald, written anonymously, Salaman and Absal
- Walter Savage Landor, Antony and Octavius
- Coventry Patmore, The Espousals (The Angel in the House, Volume 2; see also The Betrothal 1854, Faithful for Ever 1860, The Victories of Love 1863)
- Wesley family, The Bards of Epworth, anthology

=== United States ===
- George Henry Boker, Plays and Poems
- Thomas Holley Chivers, Birth–Day Song of Liberty
- William Wilberforce Lord, Andre
- Mortimer Thomson, writing under the pen name "Q. K. Philander Doesticks, P. B." (Without the pen name's abbreviations: "Queer Kritter Philander Doesticks, Perfect Brick"), Plu-ri-bus-tah, A Song That's by No Author, a satire of Henry Wadsworth Longfellow's Hiawatha
- Francois Dominique Rouquette, Fleurs d'Amerique
- Charles Sangster, The St. Lawrence and the Saguenay and Other Poems , Canadian poet published in New York
- Walt Whitman, Leaves of Grass, second edition
- John Greenleaf Whittier, The Panorama and Other Poems

=== Other ===
- Charles Sangster, The St. Lawrence and the Saguenay and Other Poems , Canadian poet published in New York by subscription

== Works published in other languages ==
- Aleardo Aleardi, Il Monte Circello ("Mount Circello"), Italy
- Juris Alunāns, Songs, Latvia
- Victor Hugo, Les Contemplations, France

== Births ==
Death years link to the corresponding "[year] in poetry" article:

- January 9 – Lizette Woodworth Reese (died 1935), American
- January 22 – A. D. Godley (died 1925), Irish-born English classical scholar and writer of light verse
- March 4 – Toru Dutt (died 1877), Indian, writing in Sanskrit, French and English
- April 7 – Mohammed Abdullah Hassan (died 1920), poet and emir of Diiriye Guure
- August 20 – Jakub Bart-Ćišinski (died 1909), Sorbian poet, writer, playwright and translator
- Date not known – Kattakkayathil Cherian Mappila (died 1936), Indian, Malayalam-language poet

== Deaths ==
Birth years link to the corresponding "[year] in poetry" article:

- February 17 – Heinrich Heine (born 1797), German
- May 2 – James Gates Percival (born 1795), American poet and scientist
- July 21 – Emil Aarestrup (born 1806), Danish
- July 29 – Karel Havlíček Borovský, Czech
- Date not known – Irayimman Thampi (born 1782), Indian, Malayalam-language poet in the court of Swathi Thirunal Rama Varma; wrote ' 'Omana tinkal kitjavo' ', a "cradle song" (or lullaby) still popular in Malayalam

== See also ==
- 19th century in poetry
- 19th century in literature
- List of years in literature
- Victorian literature
- French literature of the 19th century
- Poetry
