= Perunnelli Krishnan Vaidyar =

Perunnelli Krishnan Vaidyar (1863–1894) was follower and a friend to Sree Narayana Guru and a Malayalam poet from the state of Kerala. He was born in an Ezhava family of central Travancore. He belonged to an era called Venmani School of Malayala Literature.
