= Robert Fuller Murray =

American poet

Robert Fuller Murray (1863–1893), was a Victorian poet. Although born in the United States, Murray lived most of his life in the United Kingdom, most notably in St Andrews, Scotland. He wrote two books of poetry and was published occasionally in periodicals.

Murray was born 26 December 1863 in Roxbury, Massachusetts, son of Emmeline and John Murray, the latter a Scotsman and a Unitarian minister. In 1869 his father took him to Kelso and from that point on, except for a brief visit to Egypt, he stayed in the U.K. He attended grammar school in Ilminster and Crewkerne and in 1881 he entered the University of St Andrews. In 1886 his father died. He worked for a while assisting John M. D. Meiklejohn, Professor of the Theory, History, and Practice of Education at the University of St Andrews, and contributed some poems to the school newspaper. In 1889 he left St Andrews and worked in Edinburgh at low-level journalism, including a period of employment at the Scottish Leader. He began to have frequent bouts of colds. In 1890 he returned to St Andrews, where he contributed occasionally to Longman's Magazine. At this point it became clear he had the beginnings of "consumption" (likely tuberculosis). In 1891 he went to Egypt, but his stay was short as disliked it. He again returned to St Andrews, and his first book, The Scarlet Gown, was published. His second book, Robert F. Murray: His Poems with a Memoir, was published in 1894 after his death. The volume includes a lengthy biographical introduction by Andrew Lang. In attempting to place Murray in the context of his contemporaries, Lang said:

... the Victorian age produced Scottish practitioners of the art of light verse who are not remembered as they deserve to be. Lord Neaves, perhaps, is no more than a ready and rollicking versifier, but George Outram is an accomplished wit, and Robert Fuller Murray a disciple of Calverley who might well have rivalled his master had death not taken him while still in his pupilage.

== Works ==
- The Scarlet Gown (1891)
- Robert F. Murray, His Poems with a Memoir (1894)
