= 1857 in poetry =

Nationality words link to articles with information on the nation's poetry or literature (for instance, Irish or France).

== Events ==
- Commissioned with other Hungarian poets to write a poem of praise for a visit of Franz Joseph I of Austria to his country, János Arany instead produces the subversive ballad The Bards of Wales (A walesi bárdok), unpublished until 1863.

== Works published in English ==
=== United Kingdom ===
- Elizabeth Barrett Browning, Aurora Leigh, dated this year but first published at the end of 1856
- Edward Bulwer-Lytton, writing under the pen name "Owen Meredith", The Wanderer
- Elizabeth Gaskell, The Life of Charlotte Brontë, Smith, Elder & Co., biography
- Frederick Locker, London Lyrics (12 re-editions to 1893)
- Denis MacCarthy, Underglimpses, and Other Poems
- Theodore Martin, translated from Adam Oehlenschlager, Aladdin; or, The Wonderful Lamp

=== United States ===
- William Allen Butler, Nothing to Wear, published posthumously (first published anonymously in Harper's Weekly); the poem sold well, despite the financial panic; when a woman declared she was the author, the resulting controversy helped sales (see Mortimer Thomson's poem describing the controversy, below)
- Paul Hamilton Hayne, Sonnets and Other Poems
- Francis Scott Key, Poems
- James Lawson, Poems
- Alexander Beaufort Meek, Songs and Poems of the South
- Mortimer Thomson, writing under the pen name "Q. K. Philander Doesticks, P. B." (Without the pen name's abbreviations: "Queer Kritter Philander Doesticks, Perfect Brick"), Nothing to Say: A Slight Slap at Mobocratic Snobbery, Which Has "Nothing to Do" with "Nothing to Wear" on the controversy over the authorship of William Allen Butler's poem Nothing to Wear; Thomson was offered a dollar a line for a poem on the subject, submitted an 800-line poem and was paid in full; illustrated by John McLenan; the book sold well
- Richard Henry Stoddard, Songs of Summer
- John Greenleaf Whittier:
  - The Sycamores
  - The Poetical Works of John Greenleaf Whittier

=== Other in English ===
- Charles Heavysege, Saul: A Drama in Three Parts, first edition (second edition, 1869); Canada
- James Lionel Michael, Songs without Music, lyrics, Australia

== Works published in other languages ==
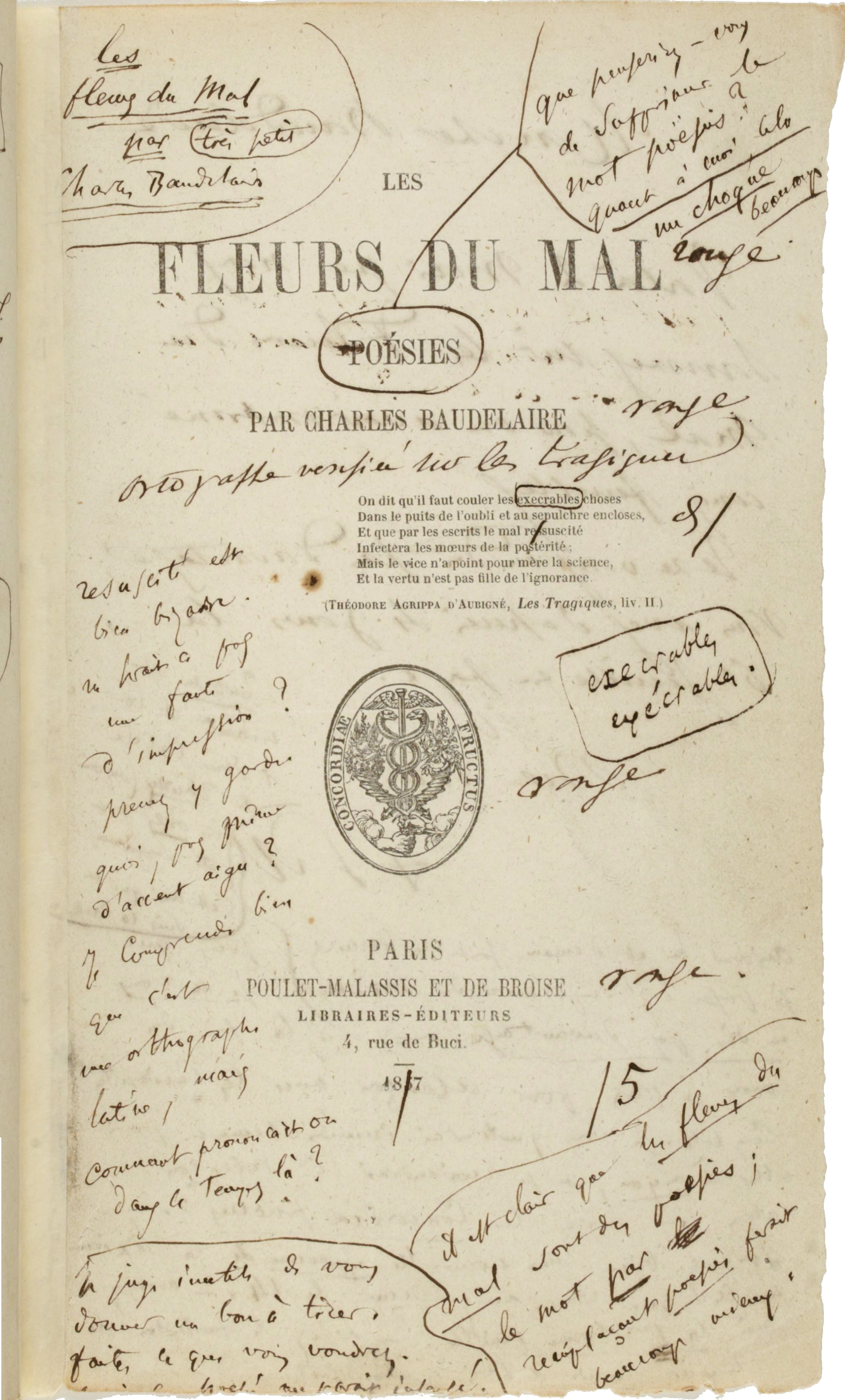
The first edition of Les Fleurs du mal by Charles Baudelaire, with author's notes.

- Théodore de Banville, Odes funambulesques, France
- Charles Baudelaire, Les Fleurs du mal ("Flowers of Evil"), France
- Giosuè Carducci, Rime, Italy
- Rosalia de Castro, La Flor, Galician Spanish poet, writing in Spanish
- Friedrich Reinhold Kreutzwald, Kalevipoeg, Estonia, revised version begins first publication
- Jan Neruda, Hřbitovní kvítí ("Cemetery Flowers"), Czech
- Georgi Sava Rakovski – „Горски пътник“ (Gorski Patnik, A Traveller in the Woods or Forest Wanderer), Bulgarian poet published in Austria

== Births ==
Death years link to the corresponding "[year] in poetry" article:

- February 27 – Agnes Mary Frances Duclaux, née Robinson (died 1944), English-born poet and biographer
- March 17 – Benjamin Franklin King, Jr. (died 1894), American poet
- March 18 – Harriet Converse Moody (died 1932), American patron of the arts
- April 11 – John Davidson (suicide 1909), Scottish poet and playwright
- April 17 – Jane Barlow (died 1917), Irish poet and novelist
- May 1 – T. W. Rolleston (died 1920), Irish-born writer, poet and translator
- June 13 – Hubert Church (died 1932), Australian poet
- September 22 – James Hebblethwaite (died 1921), Australian poet and clergyman
- Undated – Kaikobad (কায়কোবাদ) (also spelt "Kaykobad" and also known as Mohakobi Kaikobad ("Kaikobad the great poet"), pen name of Kazem Al Quereshi (died 1951), Bengali poet

== Deaths ==
Birth years link to the corresponding "[year] in poetry" article:

- February 9 – Dionysios Solomos Διονύσιος Σολωμός (born 1798), Greek poet best known for the Hymn to Liberty, the first two stanzas of which became the Greek national anthem
- March 11 – Manuel José Quintana (born 1772), Spanish
- April 11 – John Davidson (died 1909), Scottish poet and playwright
- May 2 – Alfred de Musset (born 1810), French poet and novelist
- June 25 – Isabella Kelly (born 1759), Scottish-born novelist and poet
- October 14 – Alexander Laing (born 1787), Scottish poet
- November 26 – Joseph von Eichendorff (born 1788), German poet and novelist
- December 13 – Richard Furness, "The Poet of Eyam" (born 1791), English
- Undated – Anna Ehrenström (born 1786), Swedish poet

== See also ==
- 19th century in literature
- 19th century in poetry
- 19th-century French literature
- List of years in literature
- List of years in poetry
- Poetry
- Victorian literature
