= Malayalam poetry =

Malayalam poetry is poetry written, spoken, or composed in Modern, as well as Old and Classical, Malayalam.

== History ==
The history of Malayalam poetry dates back to the 12th century; the earliest poetic work in a near-Malayalam language, or what might be a mixture of Tamil and Malayalam, is the Rama Charitam.

First poets are called Kannassan Poets and also called Niranam Poets. Dispute is still going in this case. It is said that Kannassan poets are Madhava Panikkar, Sankara Panikkar and Rama Panikkar

== Meter ==
There are two types of meters used in Malayalam poetry, also known as Kavita: the classical Sanskrit-based and Tamil-based ones.

Sanskrit meters are primarily based on trisyllabic feet. The short sound is called a laghu, a long sound is called a guru. A guru is twice as long as a laghu. A guru is usually represented by a '-–' and a laghu by a '⌣'.

For easy specification of meters, the laghu's and guru's are grouped into feet (called ganam) as follows:

| foot | name | identifying letter |
|---|---|---|
| ⌣ - - | yaganam | ya (യ) |
| ⌣ - | raganam | ra (ര) |
| - ⌣ | thaganam | tha (ത) |
| ⌣ ⌣ | bhaganam | bha (ഭ) |
| ⌣ - ⌣ | jaganam | ja (ജ) |
| ⌣ ⌣ - | saganam | sa (സ) |
| - - | maganam | ma (മ) |
| ⌣ ⌣ ⌣ | naganam | na (ന) |

Additionally, individual gurus are also identified by 'ga' or 'gam' and laghus by 'la' or 'lam'.

For example, the definition for the meter 'Kalyani' is 'three thaganam + two gurus' indicating "- - ⌣ - - ⌣ - - ⌣ - -".
