= 1855 in poetry =

Nationality words link to articles with information on the nation's poetry or literature (for instance, Irish or France).

== Events ==
- June 12 – Gaisford Prize founded
- September 27 – Alfred Tennyson reads from his new book Maud and other poems at a social gathering in the home of Robert and Elizabeth Browning in London; Dante Gabriel Rossetti makes a sketch of him doing so
- Belarusian writer Vintsent Dunin-Martsinkyevich publishes «Гапон» (Hapon) in the Russian Empire, the first poem written wholly in modern Belarusian.

== Works published ==
=== Canada ===
- Charles Heavysege:
  - The Revolt of Tartarus, a poem in six parts (Montreal)
  - Sonnets (Montreal: H. & G.M. Rose)

=== United Kingdom ===
- William Allingham, The Music-Master, illustrated by Arthur Hughes, Dante Gabriel Rossetti, and John Everett Millais
- Matthew Arnold, Poems, Second Series (see also Poems 1853) including Balder Dead
- Philip James Bailey, The Mystic, and Other Poems (see also Festus 1839)
- William Cox Bennett:
  - Anti-Maud, "by a poet of the people"; parody of Alfred Lord Tennyson's Maud (see below)
  - War Songs
- Robert Browning, Men and Women, including Childe Roland to the Dark Tower Came
- Edward Bulwer-Lytton, writing under the pen name "Owen Meredith", Clytemnestra; The Earl's Return; The Artist, and Other Poems
- Thomas Campbell, The Pleasures of Hope, with Other Poems (first published 1799), illustrated by Birket Foster, George Housman Thomas and Harrison Weir
- Sydney Dobell, writing under the pen name "S. Yendeys", and Alexander Smith, Sonnets on the War
- Leigh Hunt, Stories in Verse, a collection of his narrative poems, original and translated
- George MacDonald, Within and Without, the author's first published book
- Louisa Shore, War Lyrics
- Alfred Tennyson, Maud and other poems, including The Charge of the Light Brigade (first published in a periodical in 1854), Ode on the Death of the Duke of Wellington 1852 (see also William Cox Bennett's Anti-Maud parody, above)
- Catherine Winkworth, Lyra Germanica, first series, a popular translation of Versuch eines allgemeinen evangelischen Gesang- und Gebetbuchs by Christian Karl Josias, Freiherr von Busen (second series published in 1858)

=== United States ===
- Thomas Bailey Aldrich, The Bells: A Collection of Chimes
- Augustine Joseph Hickey Duganne, Poetical Works, posthumously published
- Henry Wadsworth Longfellow, The Song of Hiawatha, a very popular poem, often satirized from within days of its publication through the 20th century
- Bayard Taylor:
  - Poems of the Orient
  - Poems of Home and Travel
- Lucy Terry, first known African American poet, "Bars Fight, August 28, 1746", a ballad, posthumously published
- Walt Whitman, Leaves of Grass, the first edition, self-published July 4; Whitman would make many revisions in succeeding editions

=== Other ===
- Ricardo Palma, Poesías ("Poems"); Peru
- Christian Winther, Hjortens Flugt ("The Flight of the Hart"); Denmark

== Births ==
Death years link to the corresponding "[year] in poetry" article:

- May 1 – Marie Corelli (Mary Mackay) (died 1924), English novelist
- May 21 – Emile Verhaeren (died 1916), Belgian French
- August 3 – Henry Cuyler Bunner (died 1896), American
- September 12 – William Sharp (died 1905), Scottish poet writing as "Fiona Macleod"
- December 15 – Maurice Bouchor (died 1929), French
- December 28 – Juan Zorrilla de San Martín (died 1931), Uruguayan
- Date not known:
  - Devendranath Sen (died 1920), Indian, Bengali-language poet
  - Govardhanram N. Tripathi (died 1907), Indian, Gujarati-language novelist and poet
  - Alexander Young, Scottish

== Deaths ==
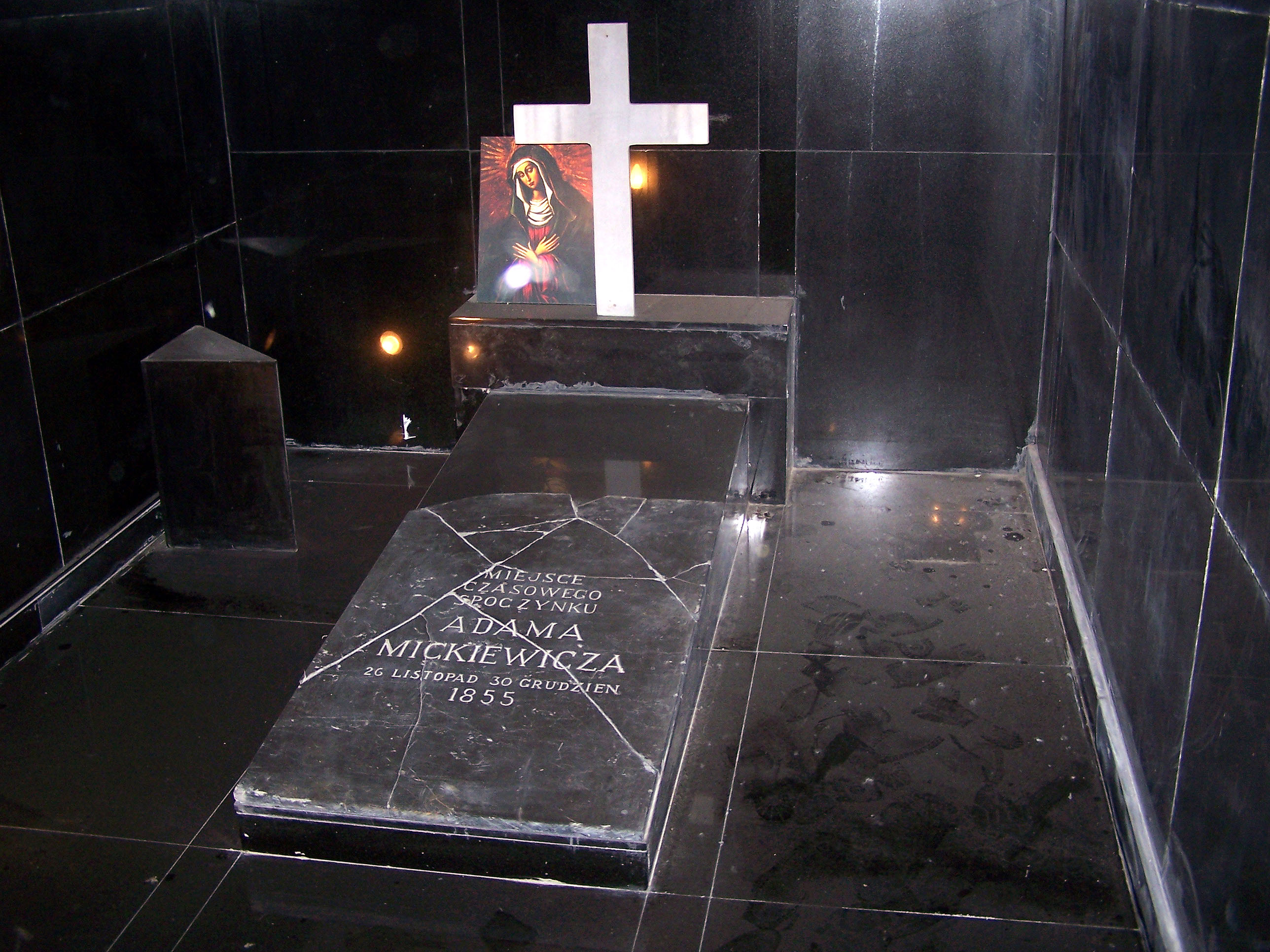
Temporary grave of the Polish poet Adam Mickiewicz in a crypt under his apartment, now Adam Mickiewicz Museum, Istanbul (another museum dedicated to the poet is in Paris)

Birth years link to the corresponding "[year] in poetry" article:

- January 3 – János Majláth (born 1786), Hungarian
- January 10 – Mary Russell Mitford (born 1787), English writer
- January 25 – Dorothy Wordsworth (born 1771), English diarist and companion to her poet brother William
- January 26 – Gérard de Nerval (born 1808), French
- March 31 – Charlotte Brontë (born 1816), English novelist and poet
- April 6 – Robert Davidson (born 1778), Scottish peasant poet
- June 29 – Delphine de Girardin (born 1804), French writer
- July 6 – Andrew Crosse (born 1784), English 'gentleman scientist' and poet
- November 26 – Adam Mickiewicz (born 1798), Polish Romantic, dies in Istanbul while organizing Polish and Jewish volunteers to fight against Russia in the Crimean War
- December 3 – Robert Montgomery (born 1807), English
- December 18 – Samuel Rogers (born 1763), English
- Date not known
  - Mahmud Gami (born 1765), Indian, Kashmiri
  - Sunthorn Phu (born 1786), Thai

== See also ==
- 19th century in poetry
- 19th century in literature
- List of years in poetry
- List of years in literature
- Victorian literature
- French literature of the 19th century
- Poetry
