= The Scholar Gipsy =

1853 poem by Matthew Arnold

The Scholar-Gipsy
- by Matthew Arnold
- Country: United Kingdom
- Language: English
- Genre(s): Elegy, topographical poem
- Media type: Print (hardback)
- Followed by: Thyrsis

"The Scholar-Gipsy" (1853) is a poem by Matthew Arnold, based on a 17th-century Oxford story found in Joseph Glanvill's The Vanity of Dogmatizing (1661, etc.). It has often been called one of the best and most popular of Arnold's poems, and is also familiar to music-lovers through Ralph Vaughan Williams' choral work An Oxford Elegy, which sets lines from this poem and from its companion-piece, "Thyrsis".

== The original story ==
Arnold prefaces the poem with an extract from Glanvill, which tells the story of an impoverished Oxford student who left his studies to join a band of gipsies, and so ingratiated himself with them that they told him many of the secrets of their trade. After some time he was discovered and recognised by two of his former Oxford associates, who learned from him that the gipsies "had a traditional kind of learning among them, and could do wonders by the power of imagination, their fancy binding that of others." When he had learned everything that the gipsies could teach him, he said, he would leave them and give an account of these secrets to the world.

In 1929 Marjorie Hope Nicolson argued that the identity of this mysterious figure was the Flemish alchemist Francis Mercury van Helmont.

== Synopsis ==
Arnold begins "The Scholar Gipsy" in pastoral mode, invoking a shepherd and describing the beauties of a rural scene, with Oxford in the distance. He then repeats the gist of Glanvill's story, but extends it with an account of rumours that the scholar gipsy was again seen from time to time around Oxford. Arnold imagines him as a shadowy figure who can even now be glimpsed in the Berkshire and Oxfordshire countryside, "waiting for the spark from Heaven to fall", and claims to have once seen him himself. He entertains a doubt as to the scholar gypsy's still being alive after two centuries, but then shakes off the thought. He cannot have died:

For what wears out the life of mortal men?
'Tis that from change to change their being rolls:
'Tis that repeated shocks, again, again,
Exhaust the energy of strongest souls,
And numb the elastic powers.

— Lines 142–146

The scholar gipsy, having renounced such a life, is

Free from the sick fatigue, the languid doubt,
Which much to have tried, in much been baffled, brings.

— Lines 164–165

and is therefore not subject to ageing and death. Arnold describes

...this strange disease of modern life,
With its sick hurry, its divided aims,

— Lines 203–204

and implores the scholar gipsy to avoid all who suffer from it, in case he too should be infected and die. Arnold ends with an extended simile of a Tyrian merchant seaman who flees from the irruption of Greek competitors to seek a new world in Iberia.

== Writing and publication ==
"The Scholar Gipsy" was written in 1853, probably immediately after "Sohrab and Rustum". In an 1857 letter to his brother Tom, referring to their friendship with Theodore Walrond and the poet Arthur Hugh Clough, Arnold wrote that "The Scholar Gipsy" was "meant to fix the remembrance of those delightful wanderings of ours in the Cumner hills before they were quite effaced". Arnold revisited these scenes many years later in his elegy for Arthur Hugh Clough, "Thyrsis", a companion-piece and, some would say, a sequel to "The Scholar Gipsy".

"The Scholar Gipsy", like "Requiescat" and "Sohrab and Rustum", first appeared in Arnold's Poems (1853), published by Longmans. During the 20th century it was many times published as a booklet, either by itself or with "Thyrsis". It appears in The Oxford Book of English Verse and in some editions of Palgrave's Golden Treasury despite its being, at 250 lines, considerably longer than most of the poems in either anthology.

== Critical opinions ==
Homer animates – Shakespeare animates, in its poor way I think Sohrab and Rustum animates – the "Gipsy Scholar" at best awakens a pleasing melancholy. But this is not what we want.

The complaining millions of men
Darken in labour and pain–

what they want is something to animate and ennoble them – not merely to add zest to their melancholy or grace to their dreams.

— Matthew Arnold

We would ask Mr. Arnold to consider whether the acceptance this poem is sure to win, does not prove to him that it is better to forget all his poetic theories, ay, and Homer and Sophocles, Milton and Goethe too, and speak straight out of things which he has felt and tested on his own pulses.

— The North British Review

"The Scholar Gipsy" has sunk into the common consciousness; it is inseparable from Oxford; it is the poetry of Oxford made, in some sense, complete.

— John William Mackail

"The Scholar Gipsy" represents very closely the ghost of each one of us, the living ghost, made up of many recollections and some wishes and promises; the excellence of the study is in part due to the poet's refusal to tie his wanderer to any actual gipsy camp or any invention resembling a plot.

— Edmund Blunden

What the poem actually offers is a charm of relaxation, a holiday from serious aims and exacting business. And what the Scholar-Gipsy really symbolises is Victorian poetry, vehicle (so often) of explicit intellectual and moral intentions, but unable to be in essence anything but relaxed, relaxing and anodyne.

— F. R. Leavis
