= An Oxford Elegy =

- Choral composition by Ralph Vaughan Williams
- The composer c. 1920
- Text: poems by Matthew Arnold: "The Scholar Gipsy", "Thyrsis"
- Language: English
- Composed: 1947–1949
- Performed: 1952
- Scoring: narrator; small mixed choir; small orchestra

An Oxford Elegy is a work for narrator, small mixed chorus and small orchestra, written by Ralph Vaughan Williams between 1947 and 1949. It uses portions of two poems by Matthew Arnold, "The Scholar Gipsy" and "Thyrsis". The first performance took place privately, whilst the public premiere took place in Oxford in June 1952, with Steuart Wilson as the speaker and Bernard Rose conductor.

All his life, Vaughan Williams wanted to create an opera from Arnold's Scholar Gipsy. As early as 1901, he had sketched a tune that eventually found its way into the later work. In an unusual move, he employed a narrator to deliver the text. The chorus generally sings wordlessly, only occasionally declaiming portions of the text to echo the speaker.

Vaughan Williams did not usually write music of melancholy nostalgia, but the subject matter makes such an approach necessary. The piece does have a subtle shift to resignation and even acceptance at the end. The work as a whole is a loving and ruminative evocation of Arnold's time and place. Hugh Ottaway has characterised the work as "pastoral" in nature. Peter Pirie has postulated that this work is Vaughan Williams' homage to his friend and fellow-composer Gustav Holst, and noted its aesthetic affinity with Flos Campi.

A typical performance usually lasts 20–25 minutes.

== Recordings ==
- HMV ASD 2487: John Westbrook (speaker); King's College Choir; Jacques Orchestra; Sir David Willcocks (first recording)
- Centaur CRC 2299: Gerard Killebrew (speaker); Chorus Civitas (orchestra and chorus); Robert Taylor, conductor
- Nimbus Records NI 5166: Jack May (speaker); Christ Church Cathedral Choir; English String Orchestra; Stephen Darlington, conductor
- Naxos 8.573426: Jeremy Irons, (speaker); City of London Choir; London Mozart Players; Hilary Davan Wetton, conductor
- Signum SIGCD557: Simon Callow, (speaker); Tenebrae Choir; Aurora Orchestra; Nigel Short, conductor
