= Empedocles on Etna =

Poetic work by Matthew Arnold

- by Matthew Arnold

Full text
- Empedocles on Etna at Wikisource

Empedocles on Etna is a dramatic poem or closet drama in two acts written by the Victorian poet-critic Matthew Arnold and first published, anonymously, in 1852. The poem describes the philosophic contemplations and suicidal ravings of the ancient Greek philosopher Empedocles (c. 494 – c. 434 BC) and his legendary death in the fires of Mount Etna on Sicily.

== Synopsis ==
The poem takes the form of a dramatic composition, which possesses almost no plot or drama whatever. There are only three characters—Callicles, "a young Harp-player"; Pausanias, "a Physician", and Empedocles. "The Scene of the Poem is on Mount Etna; at first in the forest region, afterwards on the summit of the mountain." Empedocles, addressing Pausanias, counsels him as a faithful father would his own son:

Once read thy own breast right,
And thou hast done with fears!
Man gets no other light,
Search he a thousand years.
Sink in thyself; there ask what ails thee, at that shrine!

What makes thee struggle and rave?
Why are men ill at ease?
'Tis that the lot they have
Fails their own will to please;
For man would make no murmuring, were his will obey'd.

And after a long lecture, in which he warns Pausanias against various obstacles in the voyage of life, he sums up the whole matter by giving him that sage advice which the aged philosopher could not take to himself:

I say: Fear not!
Life still leaves human effort scope.
But, since life teems with ill,
Nurse no extravagant hope;
Because thou must not dream, thou need'st not then despair!

In the second act Empedocles is all alone on the summit of Etna, that "charr'd, blacken'd, melancholy waste, crown'd by the awful peak," contemplating himself as the old and "weary man, the banished citizen," and deeply questioning "what should I do with life and living more?" He feels that he has outgrown the age in which he moves; he thinks that the people among whom he lives are like so many children, and he pants to be free from them. They would, no doubt, as he knows, gladly welcome him back amongst them; for he had in his day rendered them many valuable services, and cured diseases that erst had been considered incurable; but cui bono? ('who benefits?'). They would haunt him till "absence from himself," or what he elsewhere terms the "soul's deep eternal night"—dotage—came on, and he would fly back to solitude again to recover his strength, while at last "only death would cut his oscillations short." In the midst of gloomy reverie of this description he pauses a while, and then bursts forth:

Oh that I could glow like this mountain!
Oh that my heart bounded with the swell of the sea!
Oh that my soul were full of light as the stars!
Oh that it brooded over the world like the air!

But no, this heart will glow no more; thou art
A living man no more, Empedocles!
Nothing but a devouring flame of thought,—
But a naked, eternally restless mind!

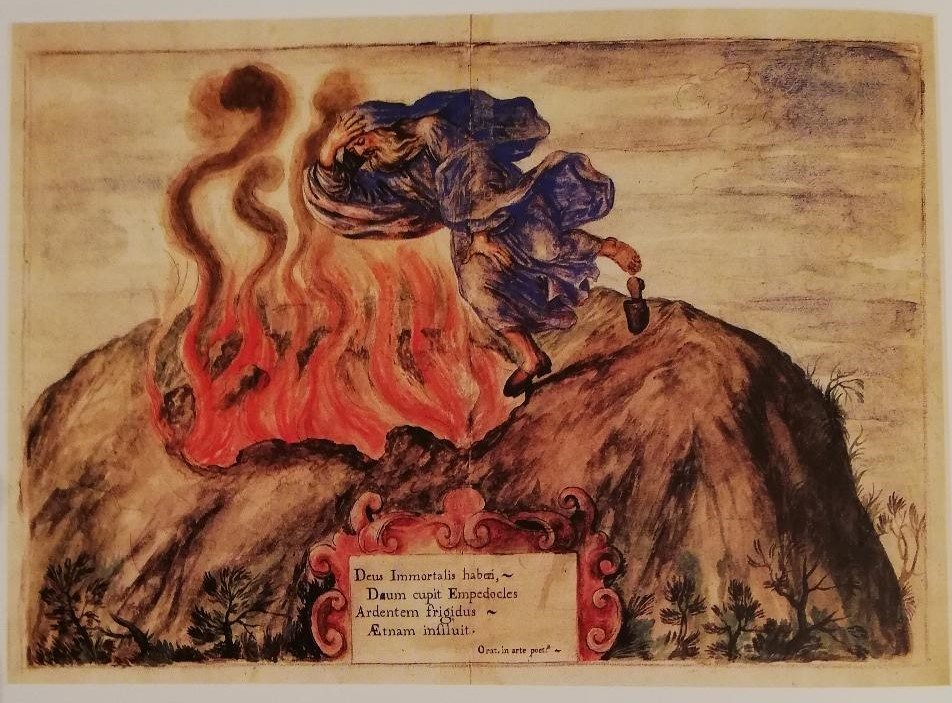
Death of Empedocles

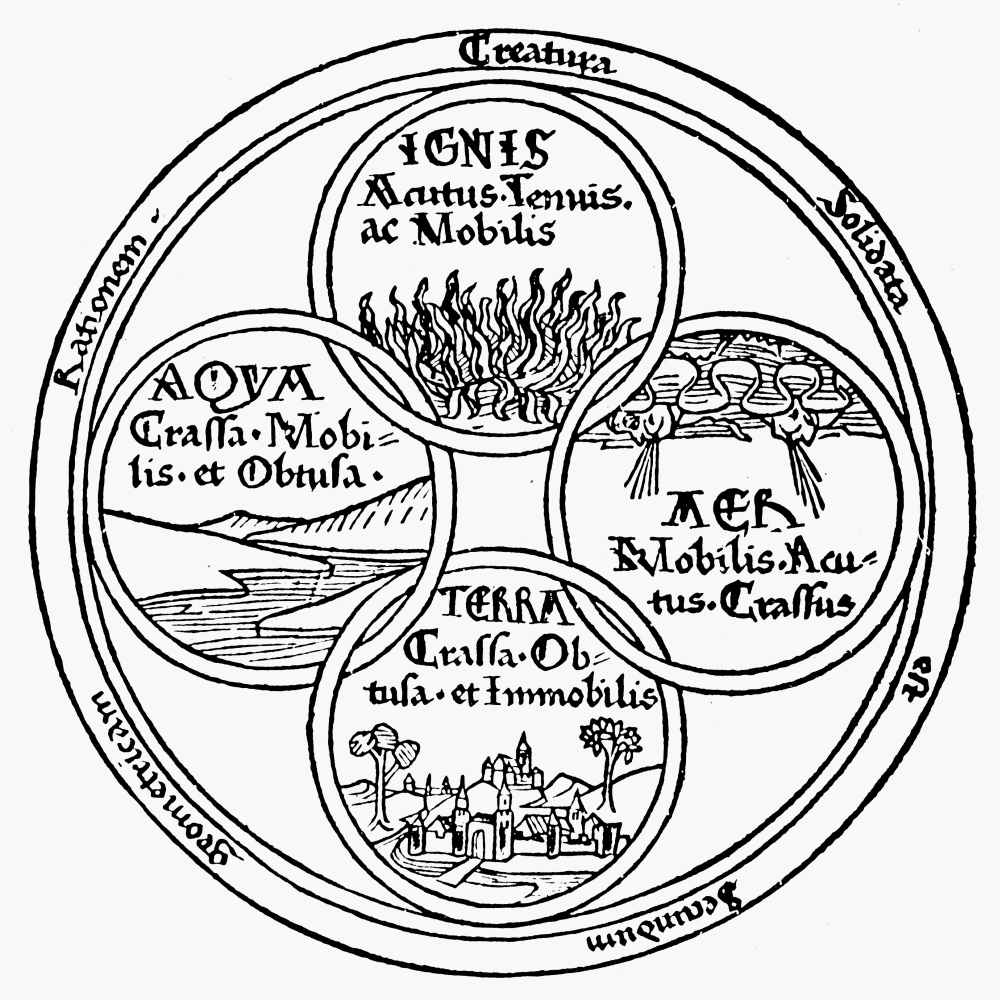
Empedocles' four elements (fire, air, water and earth), woodcut from a 1472 edition of Lucretius' De rerum natura

Then appealing to the elements, the favourite subject of his life study, to receive him and save him—for no other hope he had—he plunges into the crater of vomiting flame and smoke. Thus ends the life of the sage; and the drama itself is wound up by a song to Apollo from Callicles, who has been ensconced in a hiding place below to charm the old philosopher with his harp.

== Textual history ==
The poem was first printed in Empedocles on Etna, and Other Poems (1852), which was published anonymously, under the pseudonym "A", in 1852. As the author says in a note at the end of the volume, it was withdrawn before fifty copies were sold. Arnold was induced to reissue it on the strength of the advice of a fellow-poet, Robert Browning, and the piece was reprinted, under Arnold's name, in New Poems (London: Macmillan & Co., 1867).

Callicles' closing song to Apollo (ll. 417–468) was included by Arthur Quiller-Couch as a stand-alone lyric, "The Song of Callicles", in the two major editions (1900 and 1939) of The Oxford Book of English Verse.

== Sources ==
- Arnold, Matthew ["A"] (1852). Empedocles on Etna, and Other Poems. London: B. Fellowes. pp. 1–72.
- Baldick, Chris (2015). "Closet drama". The Oxford Dictionary of Literary Terms. 4th ed. (online ed.). Oxford University Press.
- Birch, Dinah, ed. (2009). "Empedocles on Etna". The Oxford Companion to English Literature. 7th ed. (online ed.). Oxford University Press.
- Day, Martin S. (1964). History of English Literature: 1837 to the Present. Garden City, NY: Doubleday & Company, Inc. pp. 48–49.
- Dilworth, Ira, ed. (1931). Nineteenth Century Poetry. Toronto: The Copp Clark Company, Limited. pp. 321–322.
- Quiller-Couch, Arthur, ed. (1940). The Oxford Book of English Verse, 1250–1918. United States: Oxford University Press. pp. 910–912.
- "Literature". The Glasgow Daily Herald. 21 August 1867. p. 3.
