= Culture and Anarchy =

Series of essays by Matthew Arnold

Culture and Anarchy: An Essay in Political and Social Criticism
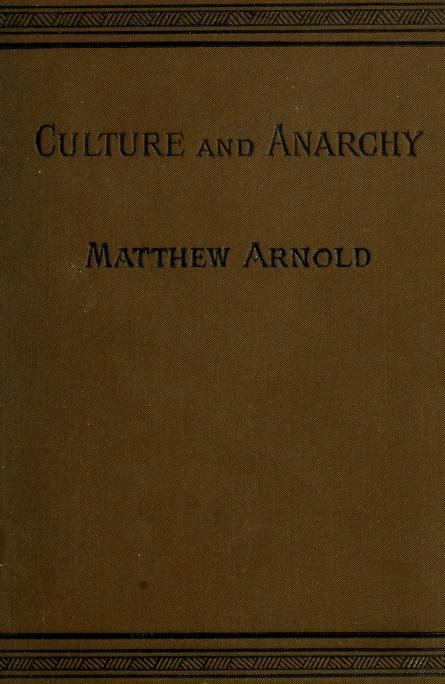
- Author: Matthew Arnold
- Publication date: 1869

Culture and Anarchy: An Essay in Political and Social Criticism is a series of periodical essays by Matthew Arnold, first published in Cornhill Magazine 1867–68 and collected as a book in 1869. The preface was added in 1869.

Arnold's famous piece of writing on culture established his High Victorian cultural agenda which remained dominant in debate from the 1860s until the 1950s.

According to his view advanced in the book, "Culture [...] is a study of perfection". He further wrote that: "[Culture] seeks to do away with classes; to make the best that has been thought and known in the world current everywhere; to make all men live in an atmosphere of sweetness and light [...]".

His often quoted phrase "[culture is] the best which has been thought and said" comes from the Preface to Culture and Anarchy:

The whole scope of the essay is to recommend culture as the great help out of our present difficulties; culture being a pursuit of our total perfection by means of getting to know, on all the matters which most concern us, the best which has been thought and said in the world, and, through this knowledge, turning a stream of fresh and free thought upon our stock notions and habits, which we now follow staunchly but mechanically, vainly imagining that there is a virtue in following them staunchly which makes up for the mischief of following them mechanically.

The book contains most of the terms – culture, sweetness and light, Barbarian, Philistine, Hebraism, and many others – which are more associated with Arnold's work influence.
