= Pausanias of Sicily =

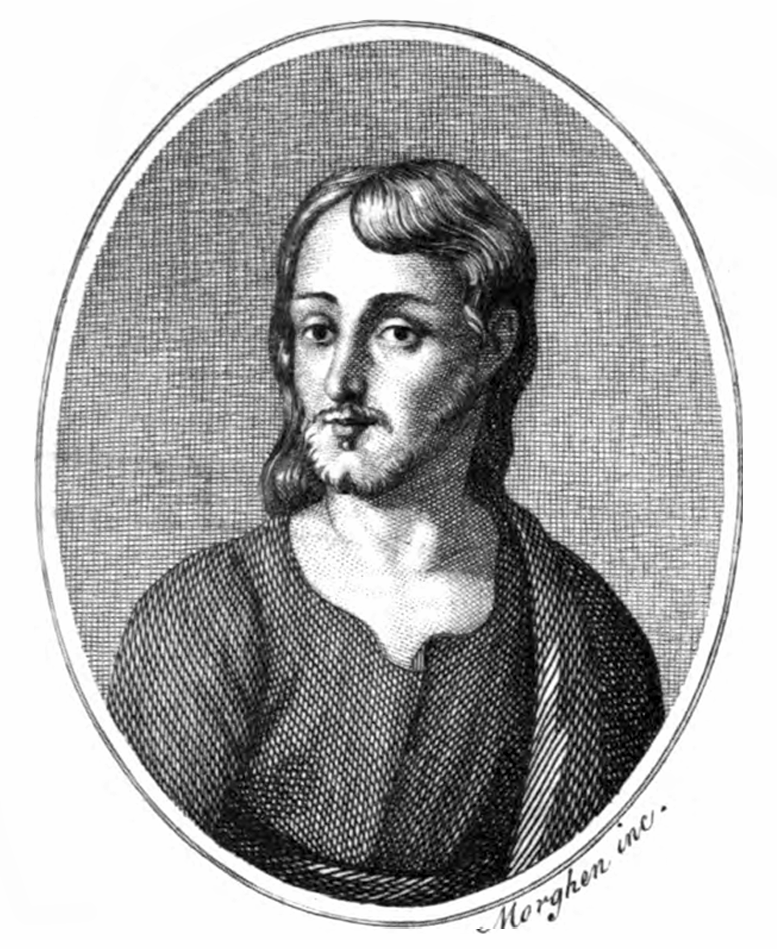
Pausanias of Gela

Pausanias (Greek: Παυσανίας; fl. 5th century BC) was a native of Sicily, Magna Graecia, who belonged to the family of the Asclepiadae and whose father's name was Anchitus. He was a physician, and an eromenos of the philosopher Empedocles, who dedicated his poem On Nature to him. There is an extant a Greek epigram on this Pausanias, which the Greek Anthology attributes to Simonides, but Diogenes Laërtius to Empedocles. These two sources also differ as to whether he was born or buried at Gela in Sicily.
