= Sweetness and light =

English Idiom

Sweetness and light is an English idiom that can be used in common speech, either as statement of personal happy consciousness, (though this may be viewed by natives as being a trifle in earnest) or as literal report on another person. Depending upon sense of humour, some may use the phrase with mild irony. For example: The two had been fighting for a month, but around others it was all sweetness and light. Esteemed humorous writer P. G. Wodehouse employed the phrase often, sometimes with a slight nod to the phrase's dual-edge. Originally, however, "sweetness and light" had a special use in literary and cultural criticism meaning "pleasing and instructive", which in classical theory was considered to be the aim and justification of poetry.

Jonathan Swift first used the phrase in his mock-heroic prose satire, "The Battle of the Books" (1704), a defense of Classical learning, which he published as a prolegomenon to his A Tale of a Tub. It gained widespread currency in the Victorian era, when English poet and essayist Matthew Arnold picked it up as the title of the first section of his 1869 book Culture and Anarchy: An Essay in Political and Social Criticism, where "sweetness and light" stands for beauty and intelligence, the two key components of an excellent culture.

== Genesis ==
"The Battle of the Books" spoofed the famous seventeenth-century Quarrel of the Ancients and the Moderns, a controversy that had raged first in France and then, less intensely, in England, about which was better, the Ancient or Modern learning. Should people model their thinkings and creative productions on ancient Greek and Latin culture, which had been rediscovered in Europe from the Renaissance on? Or should they stay faithful to medieval modernity, scholasticism and the authority of Christian monarchy and church; and create artistic works in living vernacular languages (not Greek or Latin) that flatter medieval society and values? In On Ancient and Modern Learning (1697), Swift's patron, the urbane Sir William Temple, had weighed in on the side of the Ancients, repeating the famous figure of speech used by Newton, that the moderns see further only because we are dwarves standing on the shoulders of giants. Swift has the books come to life and step down from the library shelves to stage a mock-Homeric battle, while the goddess Criticism, a hideous hag, intervenes on the side of her beloved "Moderns" in the manner of the Olympians of yore.

Midway through the story, Aesop, an ancient book, stumbles on a debate between a bee and a spider. The spider claims that the bee creates nothing of its own, whereas the spider is an original creator who "spins and spits wholly from himself, and scorns to own any obligation or assistance from without"; his web is a triumph of architecture and mathematics. The bee counters that the spider's web is spun from digested flies and other dirt and that all the spider really contributes is his poison. Bees range far and wide to search out the very best flowers, which they do not harm, while the spider only moves four inches and feeds on insects and other "vermin of the age.”

Aesop judges the argument. The ancient writers, he says, are like bees who fill their "hives with honey and wax, thus furnishing mankind with the two noblest of things, which are sweetness and light." The Ancients "are content with the bee to pretend to nothing of [their] own, beyond…flights and…language." That is, imitation of Ancient authors results in works filled with delight (sweetness) and moral wisdom (light). Later writers, notably Matthew Arnold used the phrase "sweetness and light", to designate the positive effects of a (predominantly classical) humanistic culture in arts and letters (without Swift's emphasis on originality versus imitation).

== Popularization in cultural criticism ==
The Victorian poet and essayist Matthew Arnold, who was also an inspector of schools, popularized Swift's phrase as the theme and title of the first chapter of his celebrated book of cultural criticism, Culture and Anarchy. Arnold contends that the most valuable aspect of civilization is its ability to confer "sweetness and light," and he contrasts this to the moralism, hatred, and fanaticism of some of the would-be educators and materialistic improvers of mankind. For Arnold, sweetness is beauty, and light is intelligence – and together they make up "the essential character of human perfection," which had its fullest development, he believed, among the ancient Greeks.

Arnold criticizes the religious and utilitarian reformers of his own day for wanting only to improve humanity's moral and material condition, or for focusing "solely on the scientific passion for knowing," while neglecting the human need for beauty and intelligence, which comes about through lifelong self-cultivation. Arnold concedes that the Greeks may have neglected the moral and material, but:

Greece did not err in having the idea of beauty and harmony and complete human perfection so present and paramount; it is impossible to have this idea too present and paramount; but the moral fiber must be braced too. And we, because we have braced the moral fibre, are not on that account in the right way, if at the same time the idea of beauty, harmony, and complete human perfection is wanting or misapprehended amongst us; and evidently it is wanting or misapprehended at present. And when we rely as we do on our religious organisations, which in themselves do not and cannot give us this idea, and think we have done enough if we make them spread and prevail, then, I say, we fall into our common fault of overvaluing machinery.

The phrase came into regular use as an English language idiom after the publication of Arnold's essay.

== Characterizing "Queen Anne" revival in architecture ==
In 1977, architectural historian Mark Girouard used the title Sweetness and Light: The "Queen Anne" Movement, 1860–1900, for his book chronicling the comfortably eclectic architectural style of the middle-class brick country houses that late-nineteenth-century British artists and writers built for themselves. Here "sweetness and light" implied that taste and beauty need not be restricted only to the wealthy aristocracy but could benefit all classes of society.

== Mundane pleasantry ==
During the 20th and 21st centuries, the phrase "sweetness and light" has more typically been used, not in Arnold's sense, but more mundanely, to indicate merely a friendly demeanor or a pleasant situation. Bob's close friends knew he wasn't all sweetness and light. Or: Our time at the opera was all sweetness and light. The phrase is often used ironically to denote unexpected or insincere pleasantness. The novel's tense moments are offset by long passages of sweetness and light. Or: Fred was all sweetness and light around his ex-wife.
