= On Translating Homer =

1861 book of lectures by Matthew Arnold

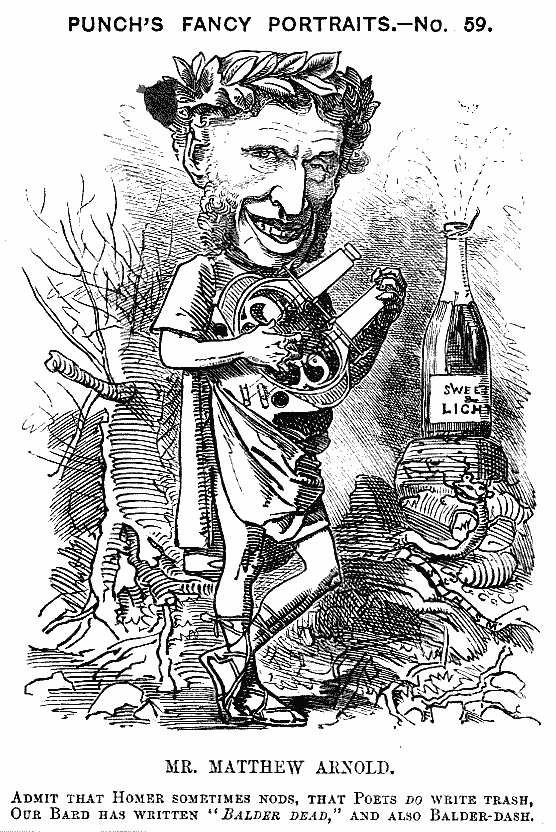
Caricature from Punch, 1881: "Admit that Homer sometimes nods, That Poets do write trash; Our Bard has written "Balder Dead," And also Balder-dash."

On Translating Homer, published in January 1861, was a printed version of the series of public lectures given by Matthew Arnold as Professor of Poetry at Oxford between 3 November and 18 December 1860.

Arnold's purpose was to discuss how his principles of literary criticism applied to the two Homeric epics and to the translation of a classical text. He comments with disapproval on John Ruskin's 1860 review article "The English translators of Homer" in the National Review. He gives much space to comparing and criticizing already-published translations of the epics, notably

- George Chapman’s Odyssey
- Alexander Pope's Iliad
- William Cowper's Iliad
- Ichabod Charles Wright's Iliad (vol. 1, 1859; vol. 2 was to appear in 1865)
- Francis W. Newman's Iliad (1856)

He adds polite comments on William Maginn's Homeric Ballads (which first appeared in Fraser's Magazine, where Arnold intended to publish these lectures).

Arnold identifies four essential qualities of Homer the poet to which the translator must do justice:

That he is eminently rapid; that he is eminently plain and direct both in the evolution of his thought and in the expression of it, that is, both in his syntax and in his words; that he is eminently plain and direct in the substance of his thought, that is, in his matter and ideas; and, finally, that he is eminently noble.

After a discussion of the meters employed by previous translators, and in other existing English narrative poetry, he argues the need for a translation of the Iliad in hexameters in a poetical dialect, like the original. He notes the German translations of the Iliad and Odyssey into hexameters by Johann Heinrich Voss. He quotes English hexameter translations of short Homeric passages by himself and by E. C. Hawtrey and also surveys original English hexameter poetry, including

- Arthur Hugh Clough, The Bothie of Tober-na-Vuolich
- Henry Wadsworth Longfellow, Evangeline

Arnold reserved much space for the criticism of the recently published translation of the Iliad into a ballad-like metre by Francis W. Newman. Newman took offence at Arnold's public criticism of his translation, and published a reply, Homeric Translation in Theory and Practice. To this Arnold in turn responded, with a last lecture, given at Oxford on 30 November 1861 and published in March 1862 under the title On Translating Homer: Last Words.

== Bibliography ==
- Matthew Arnold (1861). On Translating Homer. London: Longman, Green.
- Francis William Newman (1861). Homeric Translation in Theory and Practice: a reply to Matthew Arnold, Esq. London: Williams and Norgate.
- Matthew Arnold (1862). On Translating Homer: Last Words. London: Longman, Green.
- Ichabod Charles Wright (1864). A Letter to the Dean of Canterbury on the Homeric Lectures of Matthew Arnold. London: Macmillan & Co.
- Matthew Arnold, On the classical tradition ed. R. H. Super. Ann Arbor: University of Michigan Press, 1960. [Text with commentary.]
