= The Battle of the Books =

1704 satirical short story by Jonathan Swift

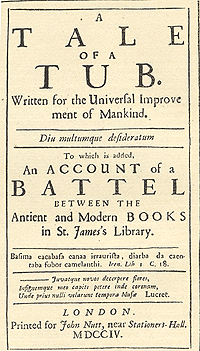
- Cover, circa 1704.
- Author: Jonathan Swift
- Language: English
- Series: A Tale of a Tub
- Genre: Satire
- Publication date: 1704
- Publication place: United Kingdom
- Text: The Battle of the Books at Wikisource

"The Battle of the Books" is a short satire written by Jonathan Swift and published as part of the prolegomena to his A Tale of a Tub in 1704. It depicts a literal battle between books in the King's Library (housed in St James's Palace at the time of the writing), as ideas and authors struggle for supremacy. Because of the satire, "The Battle of the Books" has become a term for the Quarrel of the Ancients and the Moderns. It is one of Swift's earliest well-known works.

== Ancients vs. Moderns ==
In France at the end of the seventeenth century, a minor furore arose over the question of whether contemporary learning had surpassed what was known by those in Classical Greece and Rome. The "moderns", epitomised by Bernard le Bovier de Fontenelle, took the position that the modern age of science and reason was superior to the superstitious and limited world of Greece and Rome. In his opinion, modern man saw further than the ancients ever could. The "ancients," for their part, argued that all which was necessary to be known was to be found in Virgil, Cicero, Homer, and especially Aristotle.

This literary contest was re-enacted in miniature in England when Sir William Temple published an answer to Fontenelle entitled Of Ancient and Modern Learning in 1690. His essay introduced two metaphors to the debate that would be reused by later authors. First, he proposed that modern man was just a dwarf standing upon the "shoulders of giants" (modern man saw further because he begins with the observations and learning of the ancients). They possessed a clear view of nature, and modern man only reflected/refined their vision.

These metaphors, of the dwarf/giant and the reflecting/emanative light, showed up in Swift's satire and others. Temple's essay was answered by Richard Bentley, the classicist and William Wotton, the critic. Temple's friends/clients, sometimes known as the "Christ Church Wits," referring to their association with Christ Church, Oxford and the guidance of Francis Atterbury, then attacked the "moderns", and Wotton in particular. The debate in England lasted only for a few years.

William Temple was by that point a retired minister, the Secretary of State for Charles II who had conducted peace negotiations with France. As a minister, it was beneath his station to answer common and professional (known then as "hack") authors, so most of the battle took place between Temple's enemies and Temple's proxies. Notably, Jonathan Swift was not among the participants, though he was working as Temple's secretary. Therefore, it is likely the quarrel was more of a spur to Swift's imagination than a debate that he felt inclined to enter.

== The satire ==
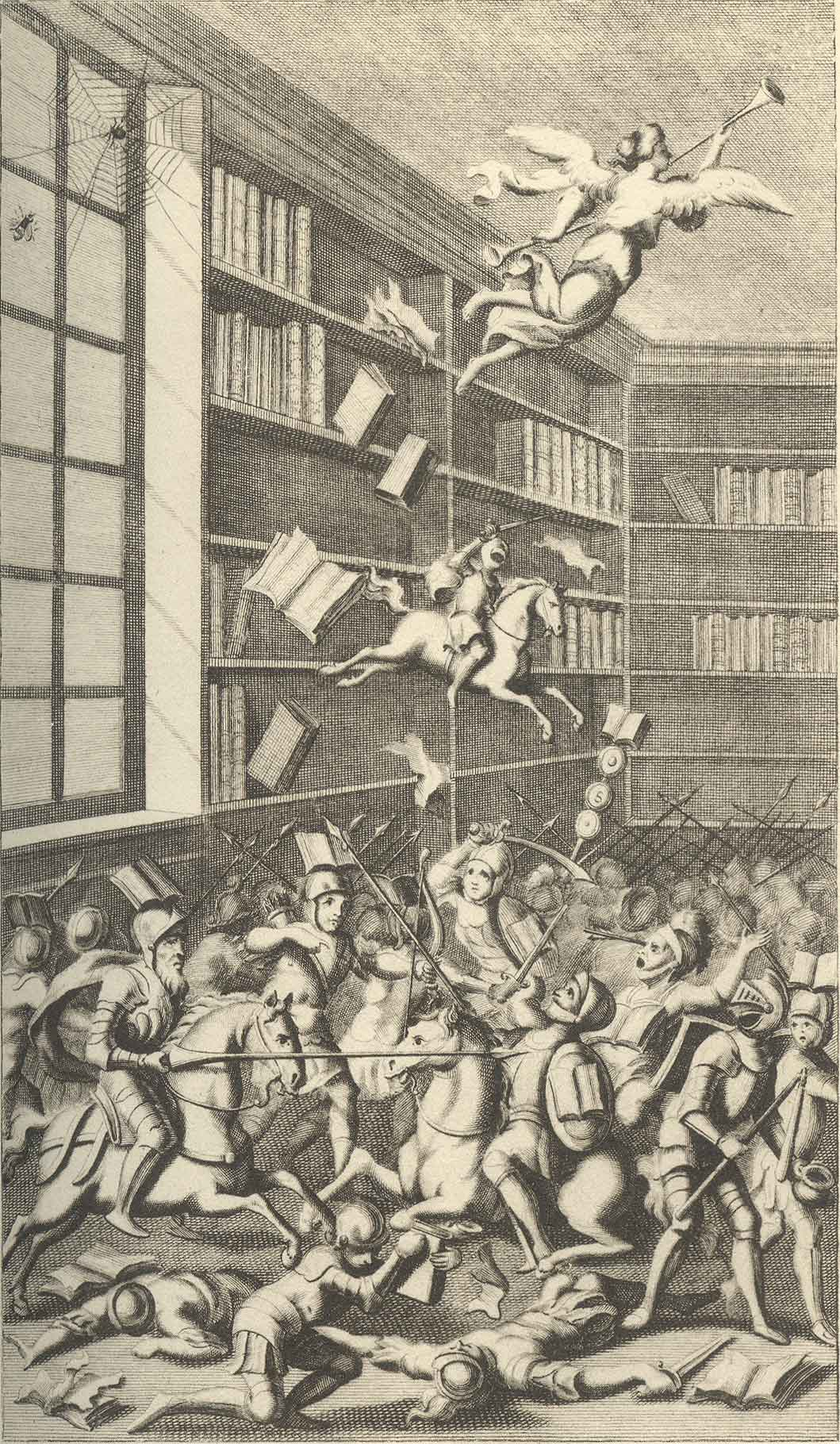
A woodcut from the Battle.

Jonathan Swift worked for William Temple during the time of the controversy, and Swift's A Tale of a Tub (1703/1705) takes part in the debate. From its first publication, Swift added a short satire entitled "The Battle of the Books" to the Tale of a Tub. In this piece, there is an epic battle fought in a library when various books come alive and attempt to settle the arguments between moderns and ancients. In Swift's satire, he skilfully manages to avoid saying which way victory fell. He portrays the manuscript as having been damaged in places, leaving the end of the battle up to the reader.

The battle is told with great detail to particular authors jousting with their replacements and critics. The battle is not just between Classical authors and modern authors, but also between authors and critics. The prose is a parody of heroic poetry along the lines of Samuel Butler's parody of battle in Hudibras.

The combat in the "Battle" is interrupted by the interpolated allegory of the spider and the bee. A spider, "swollen up to the first Magnitude, by the Destruction of infinite Numbers of Flies" resides like a castle holder above a top shelf. A bee, flying from the natural world and drawn by curiosity, wrecks the spider's web. The spider curses the bee for clumsiness and for wrecking the work of one who is his better.

The spider says that his web is his home, a stately manor, while the bee is a vagrant who goes anywhere in nature without any concern for reputation. The bee answers that he is doing the bidding of nature, aiding in the fields, while the spider's castle is merely what was drawn from its own body, which has "a good plentiful Store of Dirt and Poison."

This allegory was already somewhat old before Swift employed it, and it is a digression within the Battle proper. It also illustrates the theme of the whole work. The bee is like the ancients and like authors: it gathers its materials from nature and sings its drone song in the fields. The spider is like the moderns and like critics: it kills the weak and then spins its web (books of criticism) from the taint of its own body, digesting the viscera.

In one sense, the Battle of the Books illustrates one of the great themes that Swift would explore in A Tale of a Tub: the madness of pride involved in believing one's own age to be supreme and the inferiority of derivative works. One of the attacks in the Tale was on those who believe that being readers of works makes them the equals of the creators of works. The other satire Swift affixed to the Tale, "The Mechanical Operation of the Spirit," illustrates the other theme: an inversion of the figurative and literal as a part of madness.

== Reuse of the trope ==
Swift's Battle owed a great deal to Boileau's Le Lutrin, although it was not a translation. Instead, it was an English work based on the same premise. John Ozell attempted to answer Swift with his translation of Le Lutrin, where the battle sees Tory authors skewered by Whigs. This prompted a satire of Ozell by Swift and by Alexander Pope.

Other "battles of the books" appeared after Swift's. These were merely political attacks, as in the1729 Battel of the Poets by Edward Cooke, which was an attack on Alexander Pope. As a set piece or topos of 18th-century satire, the "Battle of the Books" was a standard shorthand for both the Quarrel of the Ancients and Moderns, and the era of Swift's battle with William Wotton.

== See also ==
- Sweetness and light
