= Empedocles =

5th century BC Greek philosopher

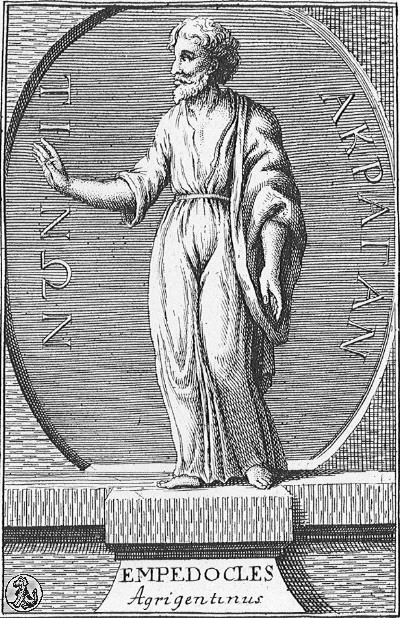
- Empedocles of Agrigentum
- Born: c. 494 BC; Akragas, Sicily
- Died: c. 434 BC

Philosophical work
- Era: Pre-Socratic philosophy
- Region: Western philosophy
- Main interests: Cosmogony, biology
- Notable ideas: Classical four elements: fire, air, earth and water Love and Strife as opposing physical forces

Empedocles (/ɛmˈpɛdəkliːz/; Ancient Greek: Ἐμπεδοκλῆς; c. 494 – c. 434 BC, fl. 444–443 BC) was a pre-Socratic Greek philosopher and a native citizen of Akragas, a Greek city in Sicily. Empedocles' philosophy is known best for originating the cosmogonic theory of the four classical elements. He also proposed forces he called Love and Strife which would mix and separate the elements, respectively.

Empedocles challenged the practice of animal sacrifice and killing animals for food. He developed a distinctive doctrine of reincarnation. He is generally considered the last Greek philosopher to have recorded his ideas in verse. Some of his work survives, more than is the case for any other pre-Socratic philosopher. Empedocles' death was mythologized by ancient writers, and has been the subject of a number of literary treatments.

Galen regarded him as the founder of the Sicilian school of medicine.

== Life ==
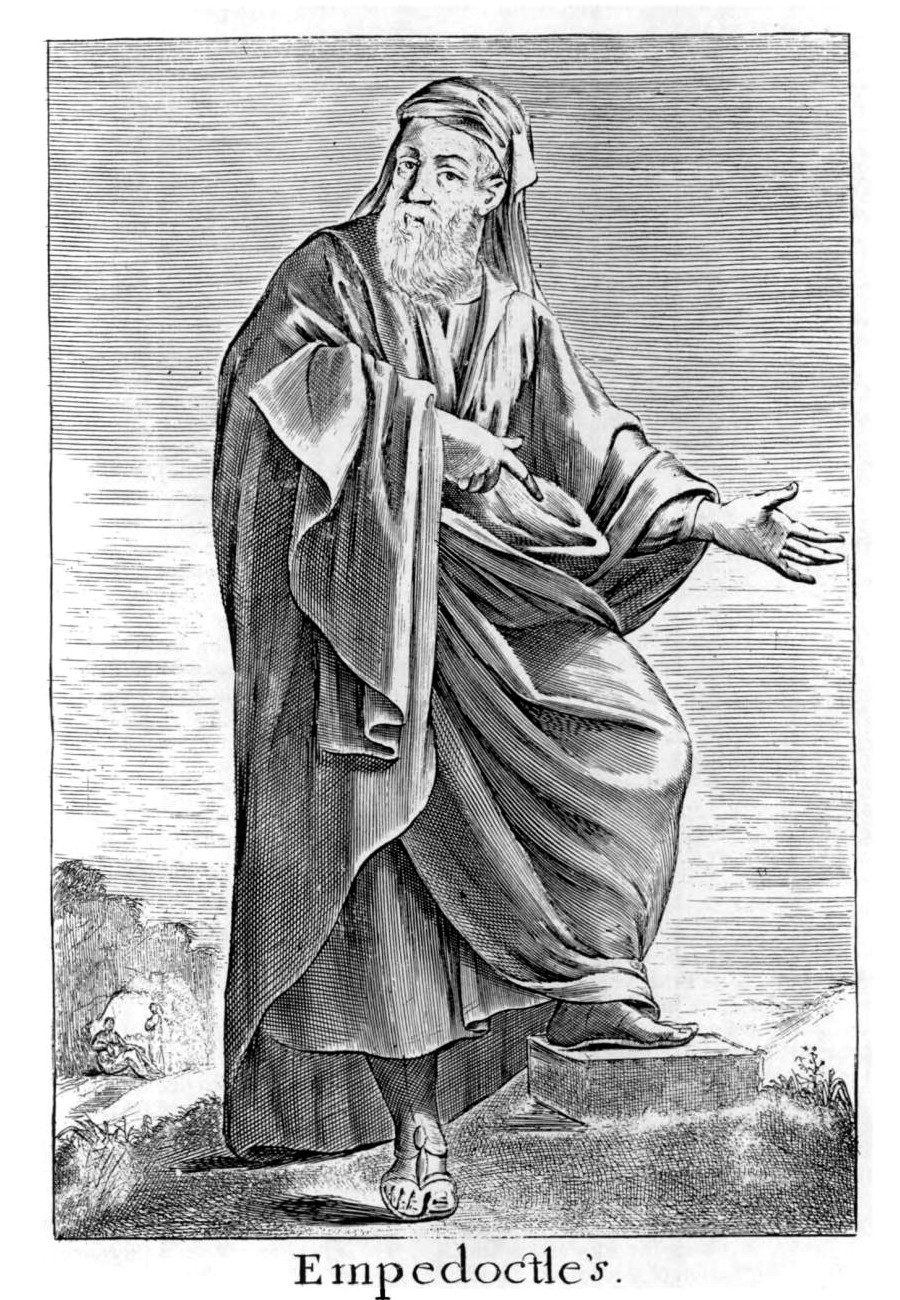
Empedocles, 17th-century engraving

The exact dates of Empedocles' birth and death are unknown, and ancient accounts of his life conflict on the exact details. However, they agree that he was born in the early 5th century BC in the Greek city of Akragas in Magna Graecia, present-day Sicily. Modern scholars believe the accuracy of the accounts that he came from a rich and noble family and that his grandfather, also named Empedocles, had won a victory in the horse race at Olympia in the 71st Olympiad (496–495 BC). (Note: Diogenes Laërtius, viii. 51) Little else can be determined with accuracy.

Primary sources of information on the life of Empedocles come from the Hellenistic period, several centuries after his own death and long after any reliable evidence about his life would have perished. Modern scholarship generally believes that these biographical details, including Aristotle's assertion that he was the "father of rhetoric", (Note: Aristotle, Poetics, 1, ap. Diogenes Laërtius, viii. 57.) his chronologically impossible tutelage under Pythagoras, and his employment as a doctor and miracle worker, were fabricated from interpretations of Empedocles' poetry, as was common practice for the biographies written during this time.

=== Death and legacy ===
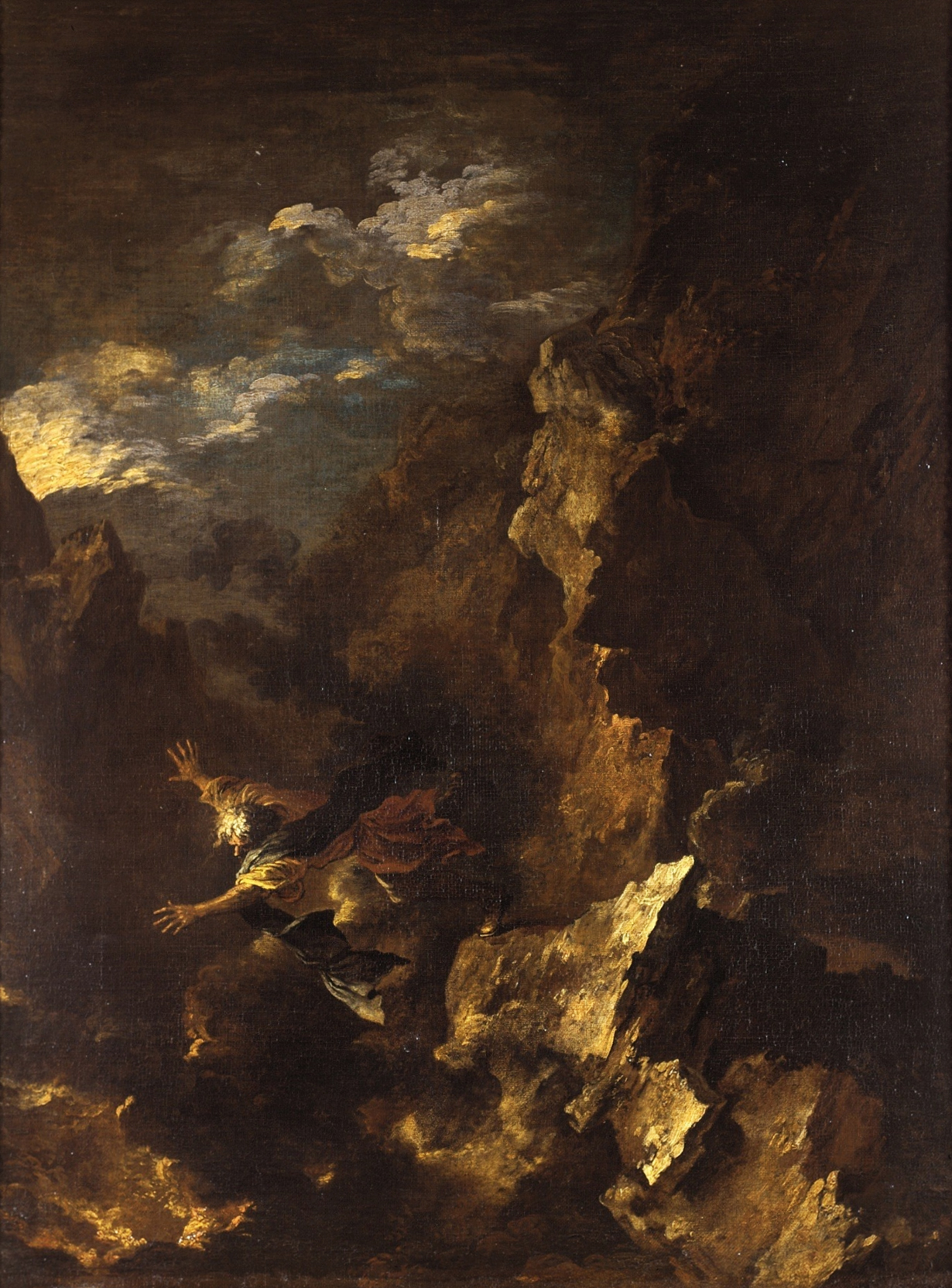
The Death of Empedocles by Salvator Rosa (1615–1673), depicting the legendary alleged suicide of Empedocles jumping into Mount Etna in Sicily

According to Aristotle, Empedocles died at the age of 60 (c. 430 BC), but other writers have him living as long as 109 years. (Note: Apollonius, ap. Diogenes Laërtius, viii. 52, comp. 74, 73) Likewise, myths survive about his death: a tradition traced to Heraclides Ponticus posits that some force removed him from Earth somehow, while another tradition had him die in the flames of Sicily’s Mount Etna. (Note: Diogenes Laërtius, viii. 67, 69, 70, 71; Horace, ad Pison. 464, etc.) Diogenes Laërtius records the legend that Empedocles threw himself into Mount Etna so people would believe his body had vanished and he had turned into an immortal god; (Note: Diogenes Laërtius, viii. 69) the volcano, however, threw back one of his bronze sandals, revealing the deceit. Another legend maintains that he jumped into the volcano to prove to his disciples that he was immortal: he believed he would come back as a god after being consumed by the fire. In Icaro-Menippus, a comedic dialogue written by the second-century satirist Lucian of Samosata, Empedocles's final fate is re-imagined. Rather than being incinerated in Mount Etna, one of its eruptions carries him up into the heavens. Although singed by the ordeal, Empedocles survives and continues his life on the Moon, surviving on dew.

Burnet states that, although Empedocles likely did not die in Sicily, both general versions of the story (one in which he kills himself, the other in which he discovers he’s the first man to survive leaving Earth) could be easily accepted by ancient writers, as there was no local tradition to contradict them.

Empedocles's death is the subject of Friedrich Hölderlin's play Der Tod des Empedokles (The Death of Empedocles) as well as Matthew Arnold's poem Empedocles on Etna.

Lucretius speaks of him enthusiastically, evidently viewing him as his model. (Note: See especially Lucretius, i. 716, etc.) Horace also refers to the death of Empedocles in his work Ars Poetica and admits poets have the right to destroy themselves. (Note: Horace Ars Poetica)

== Philosophy ==
Based on the surviving fragments of his work, modern scholars generally believe that Empedocles was directly responding to Parmenides' doctrine of monism and was likely acquainted with the work of Anaxagoras, although it is unlikely he was aware of either the later Eleatics or the doctrines of the Atomists. Many later accounts of his life claim that Empedocles studied with the Pythagoreans on the basis of his doctrine of reincarnation, although he may have instead learned this from a local tradition rather than directly from the Pythagoreans.

However, as the Modern Greek philosopher Helle Lambridis has argued, while Empedocles seems to have borrowed from the Eleatic tradition (with Parmenides at its centre) as well as from the Heraclitean and Pythagorean schools of thought, his own philosophy is very different from all these three influences. The work of Empedocles, Lambridis suggests, must be seen in relation to the work of the Greeks as a whole that borrowed elements from Egypt, Babylon and other Eastern cultures to produce a totally different philosophy.

=== Cosmogony ===
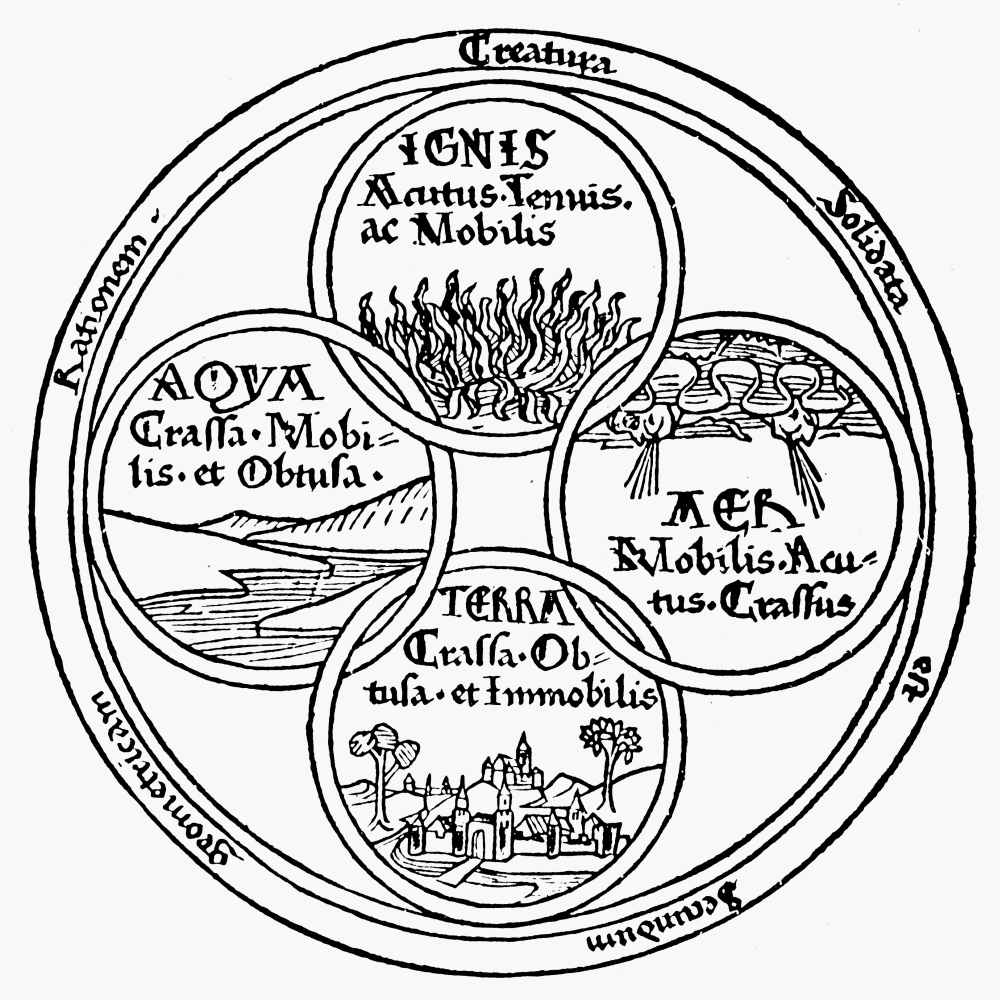
Empedocles' theory four elements (fire, air, water and earth), woodcut from a 1472 edition of Lucretius' De rerum natura

Empedocles established four ultimate elements which make all the structures in the world—fire, air, water, earth. (Note: Frag. B17 (Simplicius, Physics, 157–159)) Empedocles called these four elements "roots", which he also identified with the mythical names of Zeus, Hera, Nestis, and Aidoneus (Note: Frag. B6 (Sextus Empiricus, Against the Mathematicians, x, 315)) (e.g., "Now hear the fourfold roots of everything: enlivening Hera, Hades, shining Zeus. And Nestis, moistening mortal springs with tears"). Empedocles never used the term "element" (στοιχεῖον, stoicheion), which seems to have been first used by Plato. (Note: Plato, Timaeus, 48b–c) According to the different proportions in which these four indestructible and unchangeable elements are combined with each other the difference of the structure is produced. It is in the aggregation and segregation of elements thus arising, that Empedocles, like the atomists, found the real process which corresponds to what is popularly termed growth, increase or decrease. One interpreter describes his philosophy as asserting that "Nothing new comes or can come into being; the only change that can occur is a change in the juxtaposition of element with element." This theory of the four elements became the standard dogma for the next two thousand years.

The four elements, however, are simple, eternal, and unalterable, and as change is the consequence of their mixture and separation, it was also necessary to suppose the existence of moving powers that bring about mixture and separation. The four elements are both eternally brought into union and parted from one another by two divine powers, Love and Strife (Philotes and Neikos). Love (φιλότης) is responsible for the attraction of different forms of what we now call matter, and Strife (νεῖκος) is the cause of their separation. (Note: Frag. B35, B26 (Simplicius, Physics, 31–34)) If the four elements make up the universe, then Love and Strife explain their variation and harmony. Love and Strife are attractive and repulsive forces, respectively, which are plainly observable in human behavior, but also pervade the universe. The two forces wax and wane in their dominance, but neither force ever wholly escapes the imposition of the other.

Empedocles' cosmic cycle is based on the conflict between love and strife.

As the best and original state, there was a time when the pure elements and the two powers co-existed in a condition of rest and inertness in the form of a sphere. The elements existed together in their purity, without mixture and separation, and the uniting power of Love predominated in the sphere: the separating power of Strife guarded the extreme edges of the sphere. (Note: Frag. B35 (Simplicius, Physics, 31–34; On the Heavens, 528–530)) Since that time, Strife gained more sway and the bond which kept the pure elementary substances together in the sphere was dissolved. The elements became the world of phenomena we see today, full of contrasts and oppositions, operated on by both Love and Strife. Empedocles assumed a cyclical universe whereby the elements return and prepare the formation of the sphere for the next period of the universe.

Empedocles attempted to explain the separation of elements, the formation of earth and sea, of Sun and Moon, of atmosphere. He also dealt with the first origin of plants and animals, and with the physiology of humans. As the elements entered into combinations, there appeared strange results—heads without necks, arms without shoulders. (Note: Frag. B57 (Simplicius, On the Heavens, 586)) Then as these fragmentary structures met, there were seen horned heads on human bodies, bodies of oxen with human heads, and figures of double sex. (Note: Frag. B61 (Aelian, On Animals, xvi 29)) But most of these products of natural forces disappeared as suddenly as they arose; only in those rare cases where the parts were found to be adapted to each other did the complex structures last. Thus the organic universe sprang from spontaneous aggregations that suited each other as if this had been intended. Soon various influences reduced creatures of double sex to a male and a female, and the world was replenished with organic life.

=== Psychology ===
Like Pythagoras, Empedocles believed in the transmigration of the soul or metempsychosis, that souls can be reincarnated between humans, animals and even plants. (Note: Frag. B127 (Aelian, On Animals, xii. 7); Frag. B117 (Hippolytus, i. 3.2)) According to him, all humans, or maybe only a selected few among them, were originally long-lived daimons who dwelt in a state of bliss until committing an unspecified crime, possibly bloodshed or perjury. As a consequence, they fell to Earth, where they would be forced to spend 30,000 cycles of metempsychosis through different bodies before being able to return to the sphere of divinity. One's behavior during his lifetime would also determine his next incarnation. Wise people, who have learned the secret of life, are closer to the divine, (Note: Clement of Alexandria, Miscellanies, iv. 23.150) while their souls similarly are closer to the freedom from the cycle of reincarnations, after which they are able to rest in happiness for eternity. (Note: Clement of Alexandria, Miscellanies, v. 14.122) This cycle of mortal incarnation seems to have been inspired by the god Apollo's punishment as a servant to Admetus.

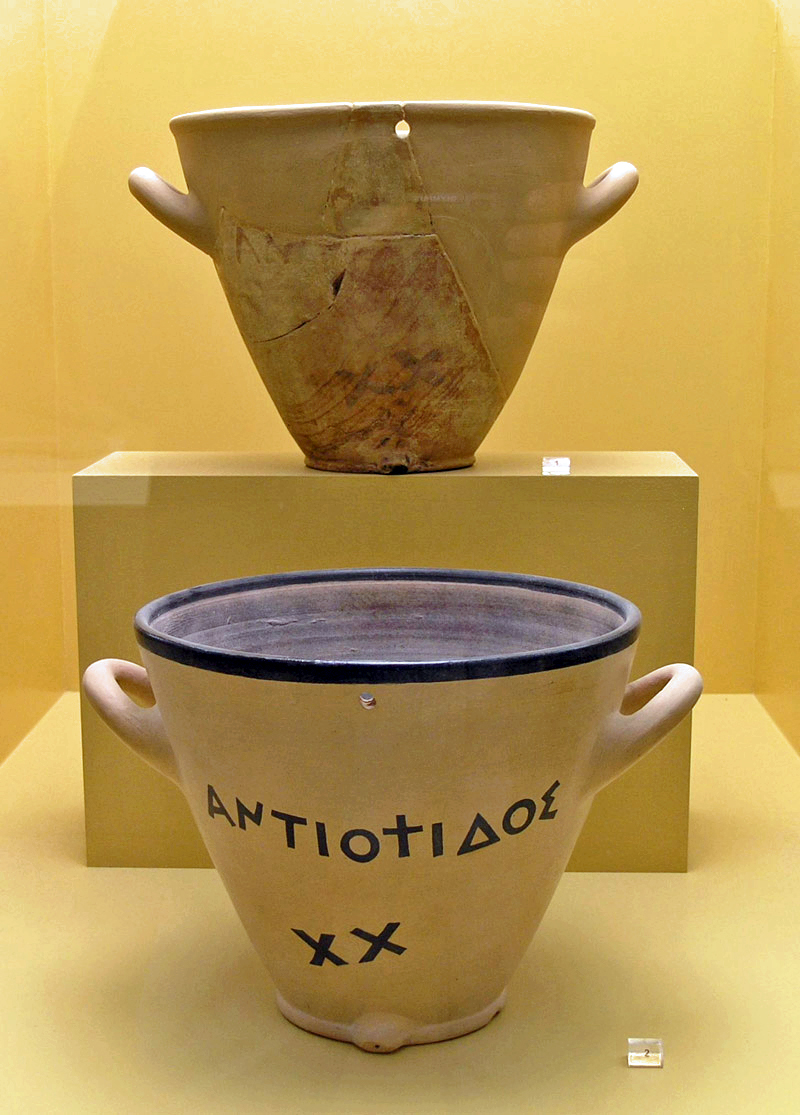
A display of a 5th century BCE clepsydra, or "water clock", together with a modern reconstruction, from the Ancient Agora Museum in Athens

Empedocles was a vegetarian (Note: Plato, Meno) and advocated vegetarianism, since the bodies of animals are also dwelling places of punished souls. (Note: Sextus Empiricus, Against the Mathematicians, ix. 127; Hippolytus, vii. 21) For Empedocles, all living things were on the same spiritual plane; plants and animals are links in a chain where humans are a link too.Though he was a vegetarian, he is famously associated with the phrase, "Miserable men, wholly miserable, restrain your hands from beans."

Empedocles is credited with the first comprehensive theory of light and vision. Historian Will Durant noted that "Empedocles suggested that light takes time to pass from one point to another." He put forward the idea that we see objects because light streams out of our eyes and touches them. While flawed, this became the fundamental basis on which later Greek philosophers and mathematicians like Euclid would construct some of the most important theories of light, vision, and optics.

Knowledge is explained by the principle that elements in the things outside us are perceived by the corresponding elements in ourselves. (Note: Frag. B109 (Aristotle, On the Soul, 404b11–15)) Like is known by like. The whole body is full of pores and hence respiration takes place over the whole frame. In the organs of sense these pores are specially adapted to receive the effluences which are continually rising from bodies around us; thus perception occurs. (Note: Frag. B100 (Aristotle, On Respiration, 473b1–474a6)) In vision, certain particles go forth from the eye to meet similar particles given forth from the object, and the resultant contact constitutes vision. (Note: Frag. B84 (Aristotle, On the Senses and their Objects, 437b23–438a5)) Perception is not merely a passive reflection of external objects.

Empedocles also attempted to explain the phenomenon of respiration by means of an elaborate analogy with the clepsydra, an ancient device for conveying liquids from one vessel to another. (Note: Aristotle, On Respiration 13) This fragment has sometimes been connected to a passage (Note: Aristotle, Physics, 213a24–7) in Aristotle's Physics where Aristotle refers to people who twisted wineskins and captured air in clepsydras to demonstrate that void does not exist. The fragment certainly implies that Empedocles knew about the corporeality of air, but he says nothing whatever about the void, and there is no evidence that Empedocles performed any experiment with clepsydras.

== Writings ==
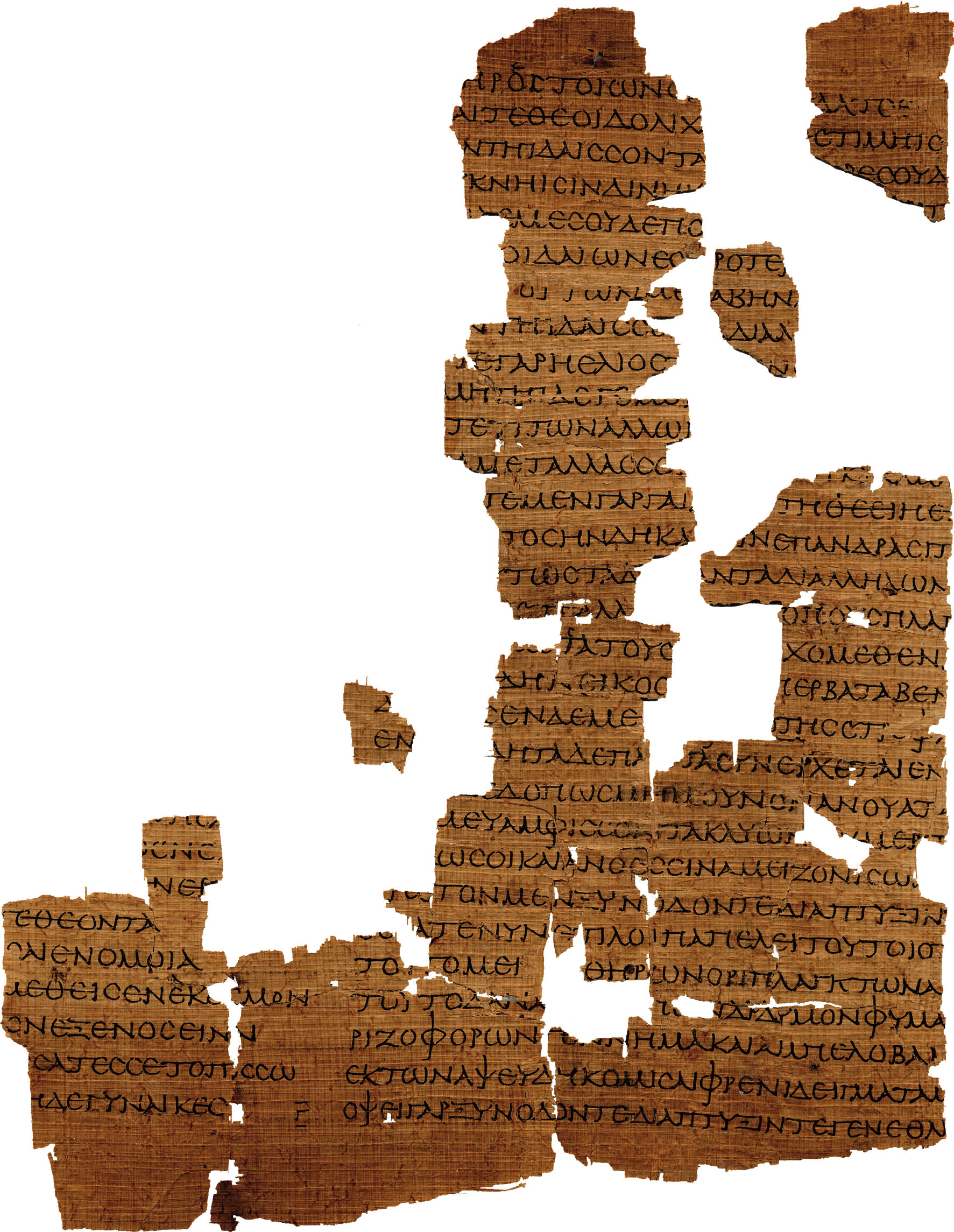
The Strasbourg Empedocles papyrus contained over 50 lines from Empedocles' work On Nature that were not published until 1999.

According to Diogenes Laertius, (Note: Diogenes Laërtius, viii. 77) Empedocles wrote two poems, "On Nature" and "On Purifications", which together comprised 5000 lines. However, only some 550 lines of his poetry survive, quoted in fragments by later ancient sources.

In old editions of Empedocles, about 450 lines were ascribed to "On Nature" which outlined his philosophical system, and explains not only the nature and history of the universe, including his theory of the four classical elements, but also theories on causation, perception, and thought, as well as explanations of terrestrial phenomena and biological processes. The other 100 lines were typically ascribed to his "Purifications", which was taken to be a poem about ritual purification, or the poem that contained all his religious and ethical thought, which early editors supposed that it was a poem that offered a mythical account of the world which may, nevertheless, have been part of Empedocles' philosophical system.

A late 20th century discovery has changed this situation. The Strasbourg papyrus (Note: Not to be confused with the Strasbourg papyrus containing Christian prayers) contains a large section of "On Nature", including many lines formerly attributed to "On Purifications". This has raised considerable debate about whether the surviving fragments of his teaching should be attributed to two separate poems, with different subject matter; whether they may all derive from one poem with two titles; or whether one title refers to part of the whole poem.

On 16 March 2026, a study on the Institut Français d'Archéologie Orientale holdings by the University of Liège revealed a set of 30 unpublished verses by Empedocles through a papyrus fragment designated Papyrus P. Fouad inv. 218, which contains the fragments of the poem "Physica", found in additional fragments of the scroll in Strasbourg.

== Notes ==
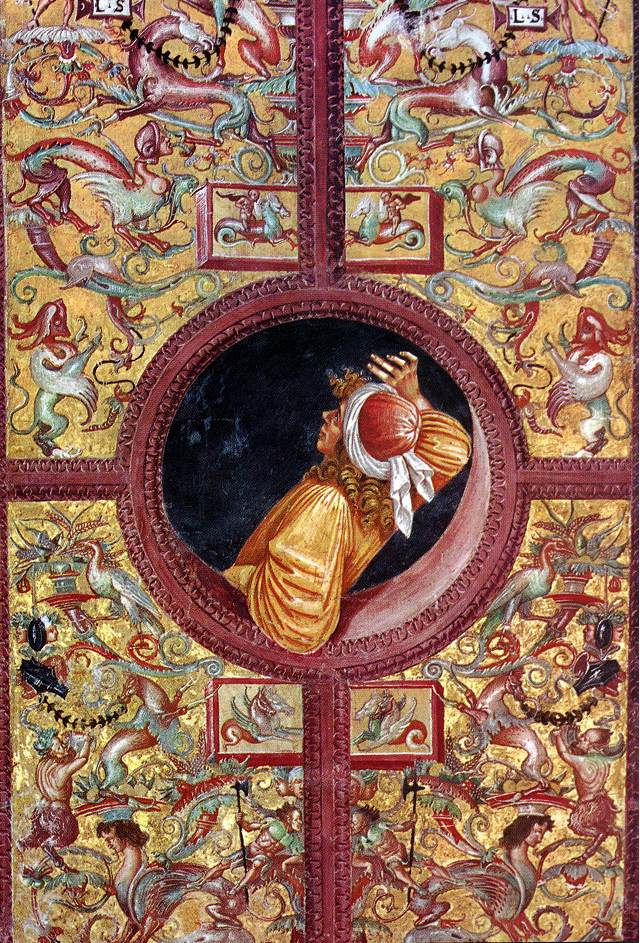
Luca Signorelli, Empedocles, 1499–1502. The fresco is part of the cycle of Stories of the Last Days that decorate the San Brizio Chapel, in the Orvieto Cathedral. Empedocles, philosopher from Agrigento, Magna Graecia, who is one of the most illustrious characters who decorate the base of the chapel, is portrayed as he observes the Last Judgment in amazement.

== Bibliography ==
=== Ancient testimony ===
- Laërtius, Diogenes. "Pythagoreans: Empedocles" . Lives of the Eminent Philosophers. Vol. 2:8. Translated by Hicks, Robert Drew (Two volume ed.). Loeb Classical Library.

=== References ===
- Barnes, Jonathan (11 September 2002). The Presocratic Philosophers. Routledge. ISBN 978-1-134-96512-0.
- Burnet, John (1892). Early Greek Philosophy. Adam and Charles Black.
- Inwood, Brad (2001). The Poem of Empedocles: A Text and Translation with an Introduction (Revised ed.). University of Toronto Press. ISBN 978-0-8020-8353-1.
- Guthrie, W. K. C. (1962). A History of Greek Philosophy: Volume 2, The Presocratic Tradition from Parmenides to Democritus. Cambridge University Press. ISBN 978-0-521-29421-8.
- Kingsley, K. Scarlett; Parry, Richard (2020). "Empedocles". In Zalta, Edward N. (ed.). Stanford Encyclopedia of Philosophy. ISSN 1095-5054. OCLC 429049174.
- Kingsley, Peter (1995). Ancient Philosophy, Mystery, and Magic: Empedocles and Pythagorean Tradition. Oxford: Clarendon Press. ISBN 0-19-814988-3.
- Martin, Alain; Primavesi, Oliver (1999). L'Empédocle de Strasbourg: (P. Strasb. gr. Inv. 1665-1666) (in French). Walter de Gruyter. ISBN 978-3-11-015129-9.
- Primavesi, Oliver (27 October 2008). "Empedocles: Physical and Mythical Divinity". In Curd, Patricia; Graham, Daniel W. (eds.). The Oxford Handbook of Presocratic Philosophy. Oxford University Press, US. ISBN 978-0-19-514687-5.
- Osborne, Catherine (1987). Rethinking early Greek philosophy : Hippolytus of Rome and the Presocratics. London: Duckworth. ISBN 0-7156-1975-6.
- Sedley, D. N. (2003). Lucretius and the Transformation of Greek Wisdom. Cambridge University Press. ISBN 978-0-521-54214-2.
- Trépanier, Simon (2004). Empedocles: An Interpretation. Routledge. ISBN 978-0-415-96700-6.
- Wallace, William (1911). "Empedocles" . Encyclopædia Britannica. Vol. 9 (11th ed.). pp. 344–345.
- Wright, M. R. (1995). Empedocles: The Extant Fragments (new ed.). London: Bristol Classical Press. ISBN 1-85399-482-0.

=== Further reading ===
- Chitwood, Ava (2004). Death by philosophy : the biographical tradition in the life and death of the archaic philosophers Empedocles, Heraclitus, and Democritus. Ann Arbor: University of Michigan Press. ISBN 9780472113880.
- Campbell, Gordon. "Empedocles". In Fieser, James; Dowden, Bradley (eds.). Internet Encyclopedia of Philosophy. ISSN 2161-0002. OCLC 37741658.
- Freeman, Kathleen (1948). Ancilla to the Pre-Socratic Philosophers: A Complete Translation of the Fragments in Diels Fragmente Der Vorsokratiker. Forgotten Books. ISBN 978-1-60680-256-4.
- Gottlieb, Anthony (2000). The Dream of Reason: A History of Western Philosophy from the Greeks to the Renaissance. London: Allen Lane. ISBN 0-7139-9143-7.
- Kirk, G. S.; Raven, J.E.; Schofield, M. (1983). The Presocratic Philosophers: A Critical History (2nd ed.). Cambridge: Cambridge University Press. ISBN 0-521-25444-2.
- Lambridis, Helle (1976). Empedocles : a philosophical investigation. Tuscaloosa, AL: University of Alabama Press. ISBN 0-8173-6615-6.
- Long, A. A. (1999). The Cambridge Companion to Early Greek Philosophy. Cambridge: Cambridge University Press. ISBN 0-521-44122-6.
- Saetta Cottone, Rossella (2023). Soleil et connaissance. Empédocle avant Platon. Paris: Les Belles Lettres. ISBN 9782350882031.
- Stamatellos, Giannis (2007). Plotinus and the Presocratics: A Philosophical Study of Presocratic Influences in Plotinus' Enneads. Albany: SUNY Press.
- Stamatellos, Giannis (2012). Introduction to Presocratics: A Thematic Approach to Early Greek Philosophy with Key Readings. Wiley-Blackwell.
- Wellmann, Tom (2020). Die Entstehung der Welt. Studien zum Straßburger Empedokles-Papyrus. Berlin/Boston: Walter de Gruyter. ISBN 978-3-11-063372-6.
