= Sohrab and Rustum =

1853 narrative poem by Matthew Arnold

- by Matthew Arnold
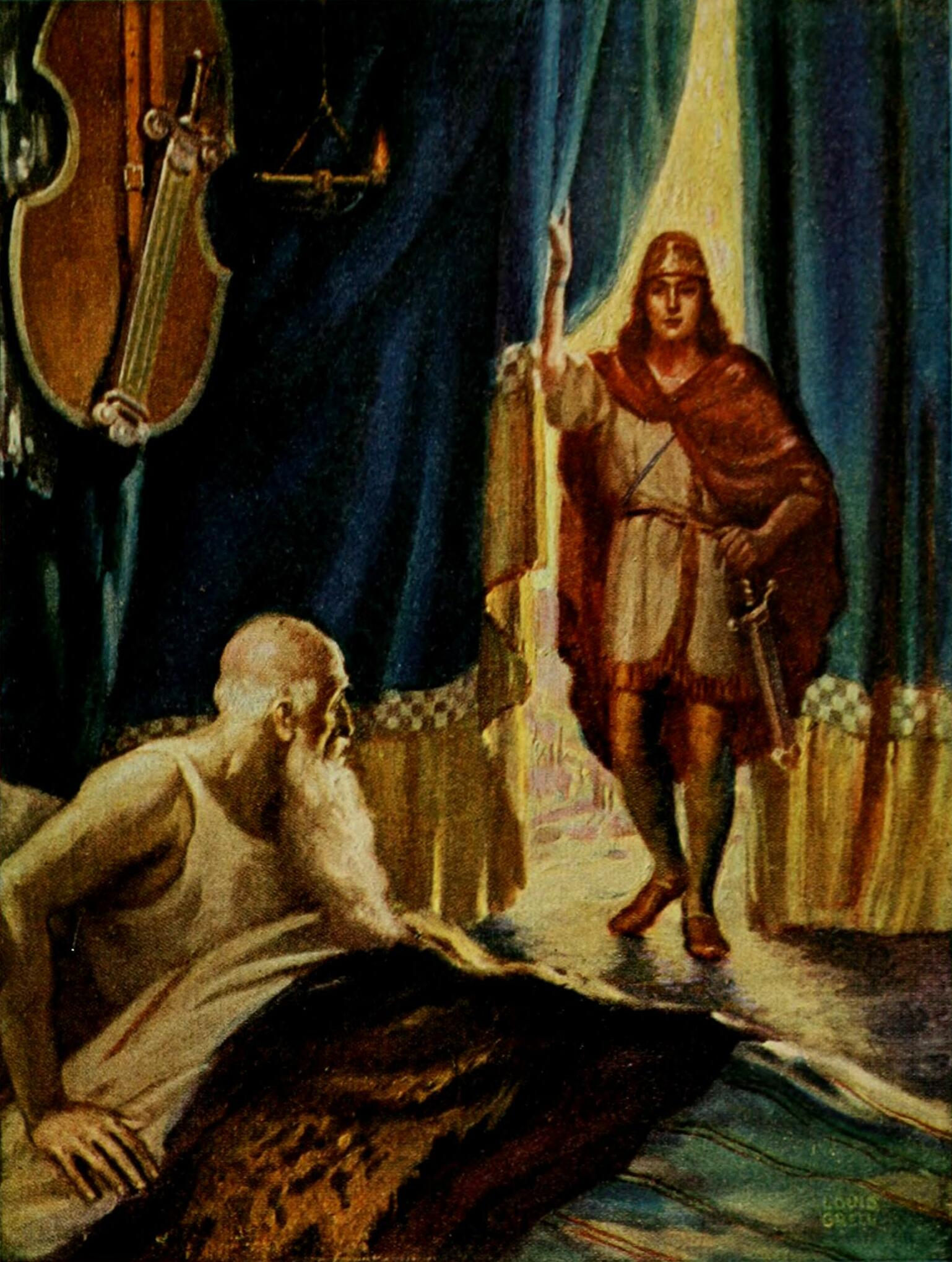
- Sohrab and Peran-Wisa
- Publication date: 1853
- Lines: 892
- Metre: Blank verse

Full text
- Sohrab and Rustum at Wikisource

Sohrab and Rustum: An Episode is a narrative poem with strong tragic themes by Matthew Arnold, first published in 1853. The poem retells a famous episode from Ferdowsi's Persian epic Shahnameh relating how the great warrior Rustum unknowingly slew his long-lost son Sohrab in single combat. Arnold, who was unable to read the original, relied on summaries of the story in John Malcolm's History of Persia and Sainte-Beuve's review of a French prose translation of Ferdowsi. In Sohrab and Rustum, Arnold attempted to imitate the "grandeur and rapidity" of Homer's style which he was to discuss in his lectures On Translating Homer (1861). The poem consists of 892 lines of blank verse.

== Synopsis ==
Rustum, the mightiest chieftain of the Persians, in the course of his mission, marries the daughter of the king of Ader-baijan, but leaves her in order to continue his uprising (or his wider effort to liberate the ancient Persians, held captive under demonic oppressors). She bears him a son named Sohrab, but fearing that the father will take him away to be a warrior sends Rustum word that the child is a girl. Sohrab, grown to young manhood and longing to find his father, takes service with the Tartar king, Afrasiab, hoping to draw the attention of Rustum by his feats of arms. As a means of quicker fame he takes occasion of an impending battle between the Tartars and the Persians to challenge the bravest Persian champion to single fight. Rustum, who is with the Persian army, though retired like Achilles on account of the Persian king's neglect, yields to the entreaties of his fellow-chieftains and accepts the challenge, but in plain armor and without announcing his name. When Sohrab first sees his antagonist he has an intuition that it is Rustum and eagerly inquires if this is not so. But Rustum, ignorant of his motive and suspecting him of seeking some pretext not to fight, refuses to reveal his identity and dares Sohrab to come on. In their first encounter, after an exchange of spears, Sohrab cleverly evades his opponent's club, by the weight of which Rustum loses his balance and falls; but Sohrab courteously refrains from this advantage and offers truce. Rustum, however, is enraged at his downfall and renews the struggle with fury. The fight is long and close and made more dreadful by a sand-storm which envelops the combatants. At length Rustum, hard-pressed, shouts his own name with the effect that Sohrab, in bewilderment, ceases to fight and is pierced by his father's spear. Dying on the sand he declares that Rustum, his father, will avenge his death; and in the affecting scene which follows, the truth at last comes out by means of a seal pricked on Sohrab's arm by his mother. At the close of the poem the father is left mourning over his son by the banks of the Oxus; and the poet's description of the river's northward course under the stars and moonlight to the Aral Sea affords relief from the emotional tension of the story.

== Legacy ==
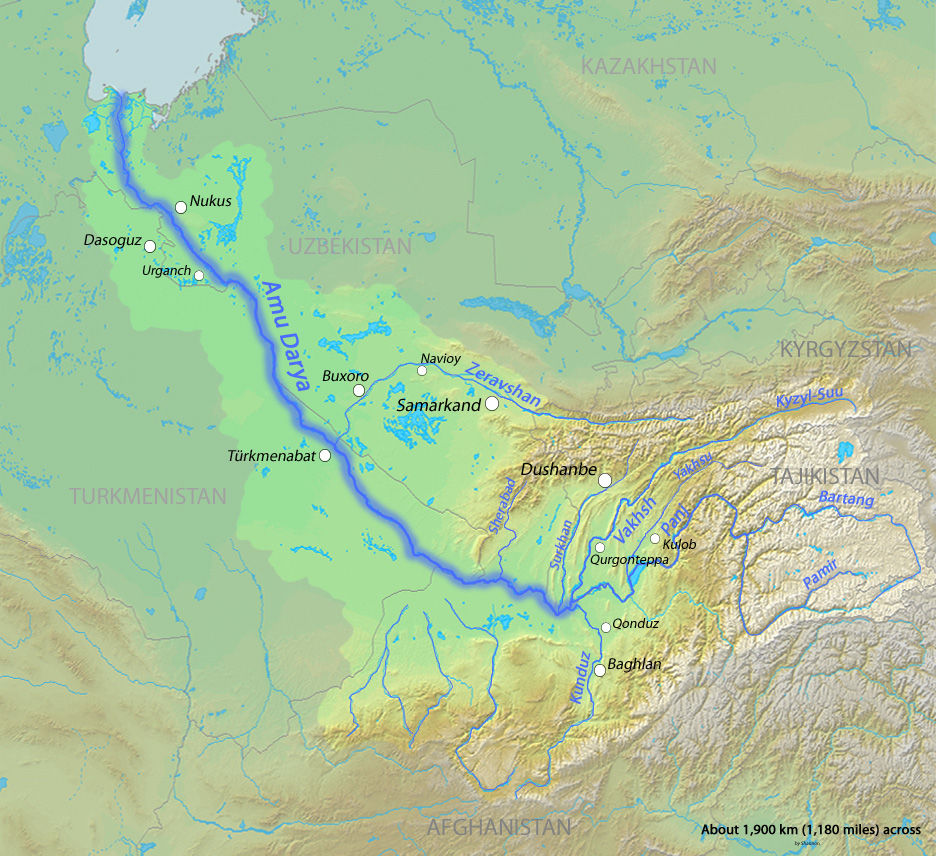
The watershed of the Oxus

The poem gave the title and place names to a notable work of children's literature, The Far-Distant Oxus, written by Katharine Hull (1921–1977) and Pamela Whitlock (1920–1982) while they were still children themselves. They were entranced by the poem, and their characters adventure over Exmoor by pony and raft during the holidays, re-naming the places they visit from the poem. Sequels were Escape to Persia, and Oxus in Summer, infused with the same spirit.

== Sources ==
- Kallendorf, Craig W. (2010). A Companion to the Classical Tradition. John Wiley & Sons. p. 87.
- Tinker, C. B. and Lowry, H. F., eds. (1950). The Poetical Works of Matthew Arnold. Oxford: Oxford University Press. pp. 488–493.

Attribution:

- Keller, Helen Rex (1924). "Sohrab and Rustum". In The Reader's Digest of Books. The Library of the World's Best Literature. New York: The Macmillan Company. pp. 798–799.
