= Augustine J. H. Duganne =

American writer

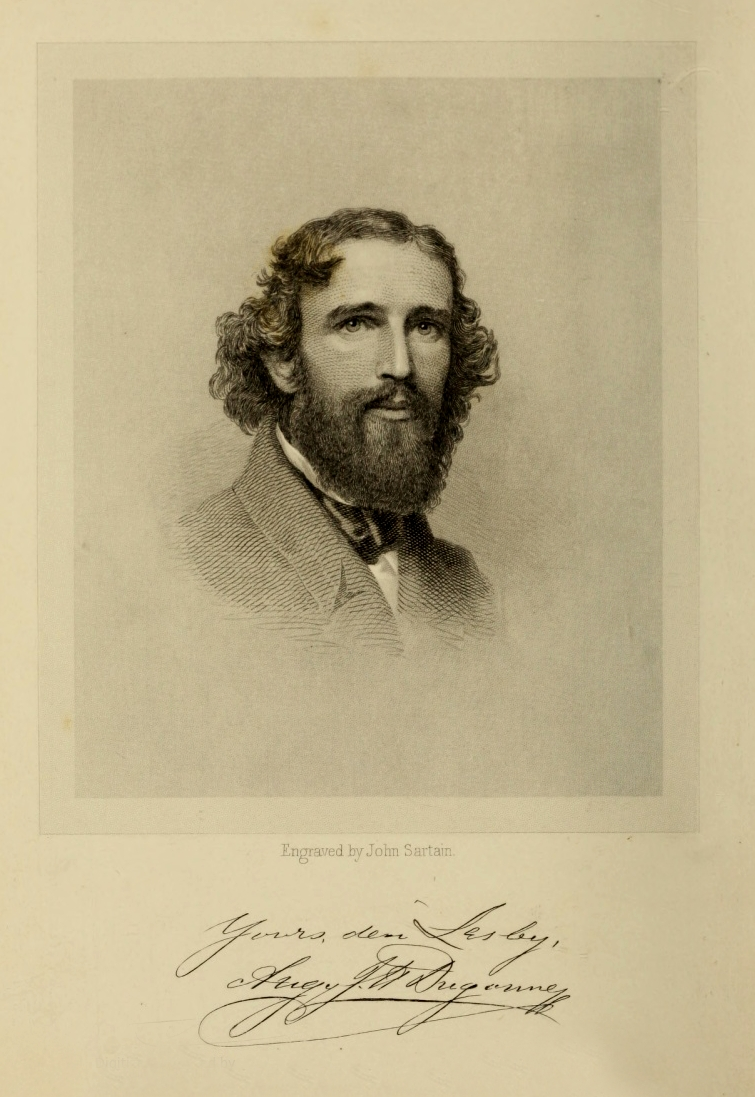
- Born: Augustine Joseph Hickey Duganne c. 1823; Boston
- Died: October 20, 1884 (aged 60–61); New York City
- Occupations: Writer, poet

Augustine Joseph Hickey Duganne (c. 1823–1884) was a Civil War era American poet, journalist, playwright, and dime novelist.

== Biography ==
Duganne was born in Boston circa 1823, and little is known about his early years. He started his literary career by writing patriotic poems that were published by newspapers. In 1844, they were collected and republished as "Hand Poems " (Boston, 1844) to critical acclaim. In 1843, he published his first novel, The Two Clerks; or, The Orphan's Gratitude.

He moved to Philadelphia in the early 1840s and developed an interest in politics after becoming involved with the labor and land reform movements.

In 1849-50, he published in Phoenixville, Pennsylvania a satirical weekly newspaper, the "Iron Man".

After relocating to New York City, he entered politics and was elected, in 1855, to the New York State Legislature from the Native American Party; he served one term.

In December 1862, he was commissioned as lieutenant-colonel of the 176th New York Volunteer Infantry. On June 23, 1863, he became a POW and spent thirteen months in various Texas prison camps. He is the author of Camps and Prison (1865), a vivid account of his war experiences. On behalf of the State of New York he collected information about the treatment of Union soldiers from New York in the Confederate prisons and prison camps.

In the postbellum period, he worked for the New-York Tribune, wrote poetry and published books. He sympathized with struggling workingmen of his time and joined the Knights of Labor. In 1871, he patented an invention dealing with improvement in printer's column-rules.

Duganne died on October 20, 1884.

== Poetical works ==
Duganne's lyrics were published in a number of labor papers in the 1840s. He kept the notion that the poet must write for and in the interests of the working class, his mission is clear in the poem, "The Song of Toil". In 1897, the Birmingham Labor Advocate published an edited version of his soulful poem, "Keep It Before the People." The poem exalts the strength, freedom, and natural equality of all humankind, and concludes with the rallying cry:

Keep it before the people:/
That the laborer claims his need:/
The right of soil,/
And the right of toil,/
From spur and bridle freed;/
The right to bear,/
And the right to share,/
With you and me, my brother!/
What is given,/
By God from heaven,/
To one as well as another!

== Quotes ==
- "Pleasure which must be enjoyed at the expense of another's pain, can never be enjoyed by a worthy mind. Pleasure's couch is virtue's grave."
