= Thyrsis (poem) =

1865 poem by Matthew Arnold

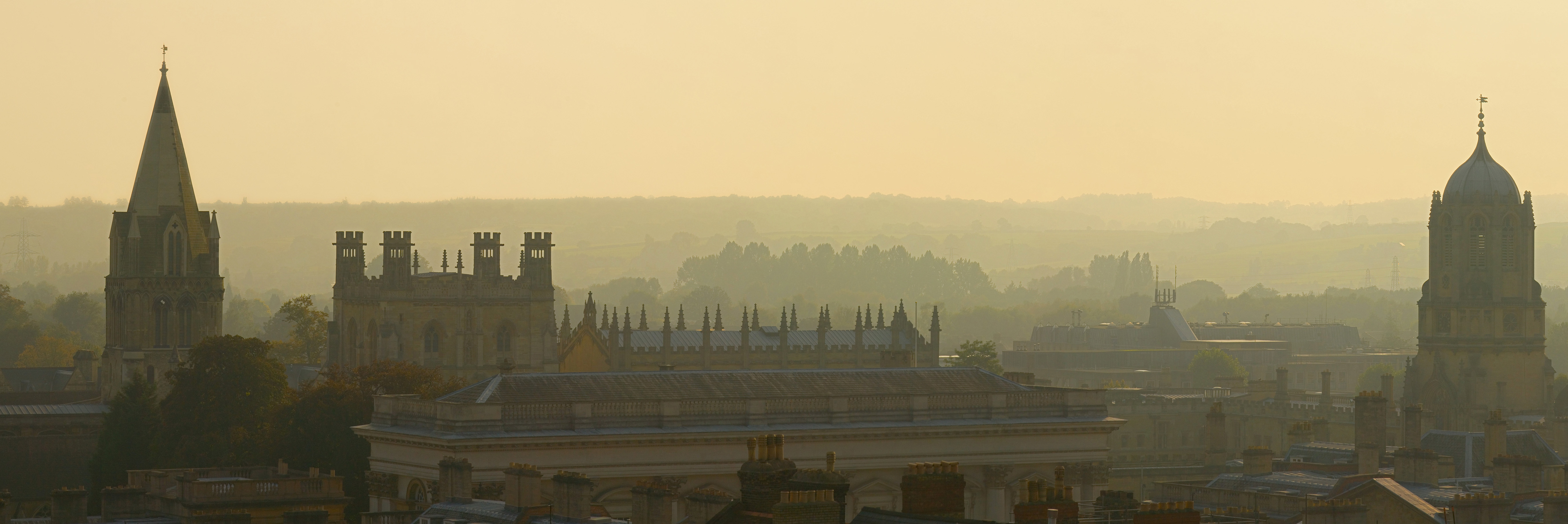
Thyrsis refers to Oxford's dreaming spires such as those on the left and right in this picture taken from the University Church of St Mary the Virgin

"Thyrsis" (from the title of Theocritus's poem "Θύρσις") is a poem written by Matthew Arnold in December 1865 to commemorate his friend, the poet Arthur Hugh Clough, who had died in November 1861 aged only 42.

== Classical sources ==
The character Thyrsis was a shepherd in Virgil's seventh Eclogue, who lost a singing match against Corydon. The implication that Clough was a loser is hardly fair, given that he is thought by many to have been one of the greatest nineteenth-century poets (but see line 80: "For Time, not Corydon, hath conquer'd thee").

Arnold's decision to imitate a Latin pastoral is ironic in that Clough was best known for The Bothie of Tober-na-Vuolich, subtitled "a long-vacation pastoral": a thoroughly modern poem which broke all the rules of classical pastoral poetry.

== Oxford's dreaming spires ==
And that sweet city with her dreaming spires,
She needs not June for beauty's heightening

— From "Thyrsis" (1865)

Arnold's poem is remembered above all for its lines describing the view of Oxford from Boars Hill. Portions of Thyrsis also appear in An Oxford Elegy by Ralph Vaughan Williams.

== See also ==
- Idyll I
