= Balder Dead =

1855 narrative poem by Matthew Arnold

Balder Dead is a narrative poem by Matthew Arnold, first published in 1855. The poem retells the story from Norse mythology of the murder of Odin's son, Balder, as brought about by the wicked machinations of Odin's blood-brother Loki.

== Synopsis ==
The evil Loki was quickly punished for murdering Balder by being exiled from Asgard. Still, it remains for the gods — the Æsir and the Vanir dwelling in Asgard — to bury and to mourn their dead.

Partly from desperate grief, and partly in defiance of the Norns' harshness, Odin begs Hermod to ride his own steed, Sleipnir, down to Hell and beg Hela to release Balder. Hermod executes the seemingly hopeless task, and receives from Hela the unexpected promise that she would release Balder should everything in the upper worlds mourn Balder's death. Before returning to Asgard, Hermod speaks with Balder's shade. Balder warns him that Hela's "promises" are never what they seem, and will bear only bitter fruit. Loki himself undertakes to frustrate the Æsir's hopes: Appearing as an ugly hag in Middle Earth, he refuses to mourn for Balder, thus breaking Hela's stipulated conditions.

Hermod returns to Hell to acquaint Balder with the gods' failure. Balder accepts what has happened without surprise, and they part, but not before Balder relates his vision of the end of the worlds in the approaching conflagration of Ragnarök.
