= Matthew Arnold =

English poet and cultural critic (1822–1888)

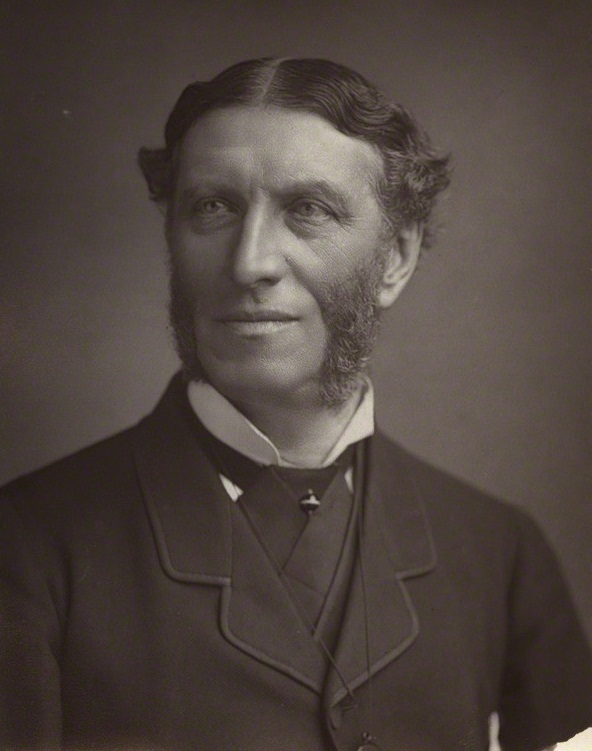
- Portrait, c. 1883
- Born: 24 December 1822; Laleham, England
- Died: 15 April 1888 (aged 65); Liverpool, England
- Education: Balliol College, Oxford (BA)
- Occupation: Her Majesty's Inspector of Schools
- Spouse: Frances Lucy (m. 1851)
- Children: 6
- Writing career
- Period: Victorian
- Genres: Poetry; literary, social and religious criticism
- Notable works: "The Scholar-Gipsy" (1853), "Thyrsis" (1865), "Dover Beach" (1867), Culture and Anarchy (1869), Literature and Dogma (1873)

Matthew Arnold (24 December 1822 – 15 April 1888) was an English poet and cultural critic. He was the son of Thomas Arnold, the headmaster of Rugby School, and brother of both Tom Arnold, literary professor, and William Delafield Arnold, novelist and colonial administrator. He has been characterised as a sage writer, a type of writer who chastises and instructs the reader on contemporary social issues. He was also an inspector of schools for thirty-five years, and supported the concept of state-regulated secondary education.

== Early years ==
Matthew Arnold was born on 24 December 1822 at Laleham-on-Thames, Middlesex, the eldest son of Thomas Arnold and Mary Penrose Arnold. John Keble stood as godfather to Matthew.

In 1828, Thomas Arnold was appointed Headmaster of Rugby School, where the family took up residence, that year. From 1831, Matthew Arnold was tutored by his clerical uncle, John Buckland, in Laleham. In 1834, the Arnolds occupied a holiday home, Fox How, in the Lake District. There William Wordsworth was a neighbour and close friend.

In 1836, Arnold was sent to Winchester College, but in 1837 he returned to Rugby School. He moved to the sixth form in 1838 and so came under the direct tutelage of his father. He wrote verse for a family magazine, and won school prizes. His prize poem, "Alaric at Rome", was printed at Rugby.

In November 1840, aged 17, Arnold matriculated at Balliol College, Oxford, where in 1841 he won an open scholarship, graduating B.A. in 1844. During his student years at Oxford, his friendship became stronger with Arthur Hugh Clough, a Rugby pupil who had been one of his father's favourites. He attended John Henry Newman's sermons at the University Church of St Mary the Virgin but did not join the Oxford Movement. After his father's death in 1842, Fox How became the family's permanent residence. His poem Cromwell won the 1843 Newdigate prize. He graduated in the following year with second class honours in Literae Humaniores.

In 1845, after a short interlude of teaching at Rugby, Arnold was elected Fellow of Oriel College, Oxford. In 1847, he became Private Secretary to Lord Lansdowne, Lord President of the Council. In 1849, he published his first book of poetry, The Strayed Reveller. In 1850 Wordsworth died; Arnold published his "Memorial Verses" on the older poet in Fraser's Magazine.

== Marriage and career ==
Wishing to marry but unable to support a family on the wages of a private secretary, Arnold sought a more secure position and, in April 1851, was appointed one of Her Majesty's Inspectors of Schools. Two months later, he married Frances Lucy Wightman (1825-1901), daughter of Sir William Wightman, Justice of the Queen's Bench.

Arnold often described his duties as a school inspector as "drudgery" although "at other times he acknowledged the benefit of regular work." The inspectorship required him, at least at first, to travel constantly and across much of England. As narrated by Stefan Collini in his 1988 book on Arnold: "Initially, Arnold was responsible for inspecting Nonconformist schools across a broad swath of central England. He spent many dreary hours during the 1850s in railway waiting rooms and small-town hotels, and longer hours still listening to children reciting their lessons and parents reciting their grievances. But that also meant that he, among the first generation of the railway age, travelled across more of England than any man of letters had ever done. Although his duties were later confined to a smaller area, Arnold knew the society of provincial England better than most of the metropolitan authors and politicians of the day."

== Literary career ==
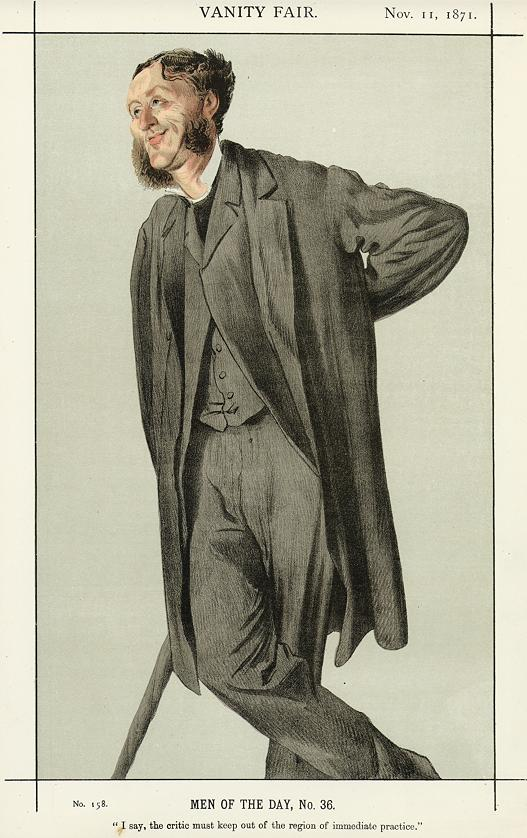
Caricature by James Tissot published in Vanity Fair in 1871

In 1852, Arnold published his second volume of poems, Empedocles on Etna, and Other Poems. In 1853, he published Poems: A New Edition, a selection from the two earlier volumes famously excluding Empedocles on Etna, but adding new poems, Sohrab and Rustum and The Scholar Gipsy. In 1854, Poems: Second Series appeared; also a selection, it included the new poem Balder Dead.

Arnold was elected Professor of Poetry at Oxford in 1857, and he was the first in this position to deliver his lectures in English rather than in Latin. He was re-elected in 1862. On Translating Homer (1861) and the initial thoughts that Arnold would transform into Culture and Anarchy were among the fruits of the Oxford lectures. In 1859, he conducted the first of three trips to the continent at the behest of parliament to study European educational practices. He self-published The Popular Education of France (1861), the introduction to which was later published under the title Democracy (1879).

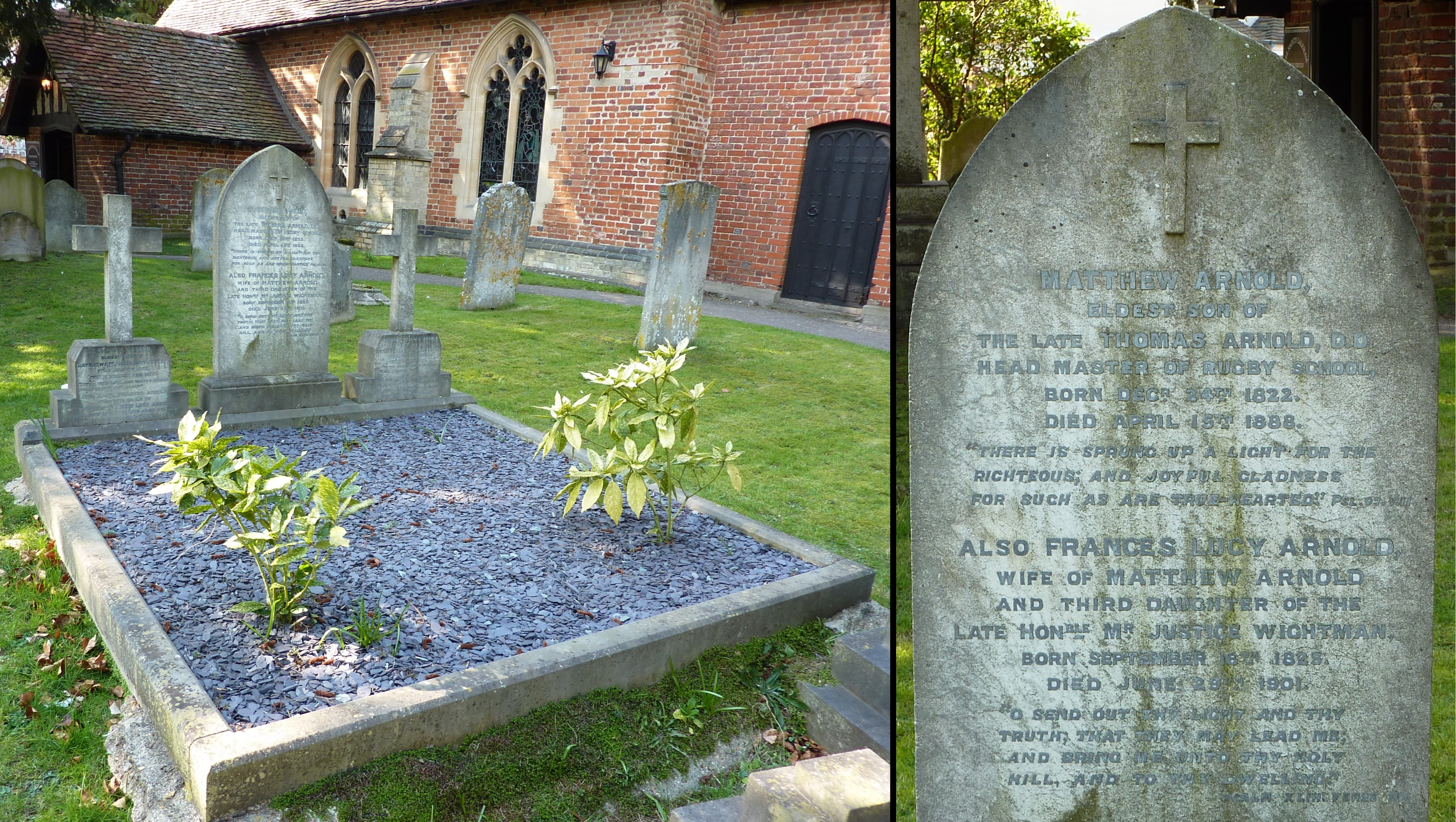
Matthew Arnold's grave at All Saints' Church, Laleham, Surrey.

In 1865, Arnold published Essays in Criticism: First Series. Essays in Criticism: Second Series would not appear until November 1888, shortly after his death. In 1866, he published Thyrsis, his elegy to Clough who had died in 1861. Culture and Anarchy, Arnold's major work in social criticism (and one of the few pieces of his prose work currently in print) was published in 1869. Literature and Dogma, Arnold's major work in religious criticism appeared in 1873. In 1883 and 1884, Arnold toured the United States and Canada delivering lectures on education, democracy and Ralph Waldo Emerson. He was elected a Foreign Honorary Member of the American Academy of Arts and Sciences in 1883. In 1886, he retired from school inspection and made another trip to America. An edition of Poems by Matthew Arnold, with an introduction by A. C. Benson and illustrations by Henry Ospovat, was published in 1900 by John Lane.

== Death ==
Arnold died suddenly in 1888 of heart failure whilst running to meet a tram that would have taken him to the Liverpool Landing Stage to see his daughter, who was visiting from the United States where she had moved after marrying an American. His wife died in June 1901.

== Character ==
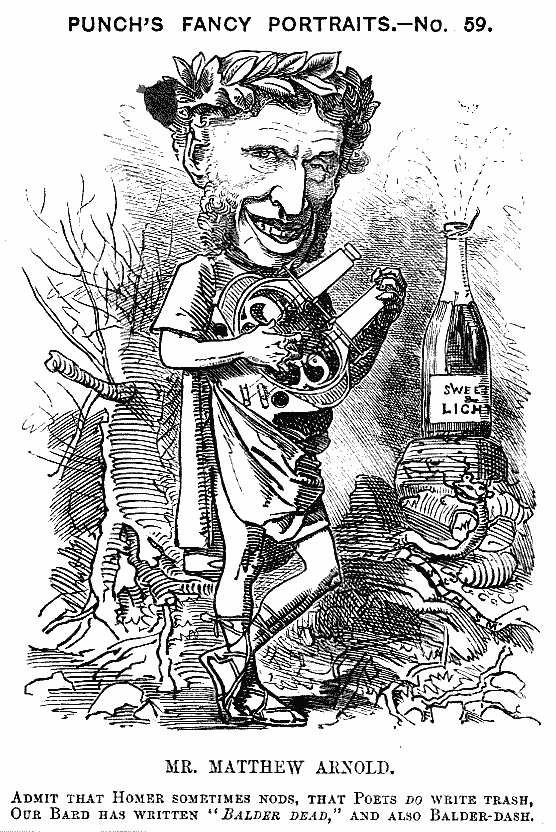
Caricature from Punch, 1881: "Admit that Homer sometimes nods, That poets do write trash, Our Bard has written "Balder Dead," And also Balder-dash"

"Matthew Arnold", wrote G. W. E. Russell in Portraits of the Seventies, is "a man of the world entirely free from worldliness and a man of letters without the faintest trace of pedantry". Arnold was a familiar figure at the Athenaeum Club, a frequent diner-out and guest at great country houses, charming, fond of fishing (but not of shooting), and a lively conversationalist, with a self-consciously cultivated air combining foppishness and Olympian grandeur. He read constantly, widely, and deeply, and in the intervals of supporting himself and his family by the quiet drudgery of school inspecting, filled notebook after notebook with meditations of an almost monastic tone. In his writings, he often baffled and sometimes annoyed his contemporaries by the apparent contradiction between his urbane, even frivolous manner in controversy, and the "high seriousness" of his critical views and the melancholy, almost plaintive note of much of his poetry. "A voice poking fun in the wilderness" was T. H. Warren's description of him.

== Poetry ==
Arnold's literary career—aside from two youthful prize poems—had begun in 1849 with the publication of The Strayed Reveller and Other Poems by A., which attracted little notice and was soon withdrawn. It contained what is perhaps Arnold's most purely poetical poem, "The Forsaken Merman." Empedocles on Etna and Other Poems (among them "Tristram and Iseult"), published in 1852, had a similar fate. In 1858 he published his tragedy of Merope, calculated, he wrote to a friend, "rather to inaugurate my Professorship with dignity than to move deeply the present race of humans," and chiefly remarkable for some experiments in unusual—and unsuccessful—metres. Arnold is sometimes called the third great Victorian poet, along with Alfred, Lord Tennyson, and Robert Browning.

Harold Bloom echoes Arnold's self-characterization in his introduction (as series editor) to the Modern Critical Views volume on Arnold: "Arnold got into his poetry what Tennyson and Browning scarcely needed (but absorbed anyway), the main march of mind in his time." Of his poetry, Bloom says,

Whatever his achievement as a critic of literature, society, or religion, his work as a poet may not merit the reputation it has continued to hold in the twentieth century. Arnold is, at his best, a very good but highly derivative poet. ... As with Tennyson, Hopkins, and Rossetti, Arnold's dominant precursor was Keats, but this is an unhappy puzzle, since Arnold (unlike the others) professed not to admire Keats greatly, while writing his own elegiac poems in a diction, meter, imagistic procedure, that are embarrassingly close to Keats.

The writer John Cowper Powys, an admirer, wrote that, "with the possible exception of Merope, Matthew Arnold's poetry is arresting from cover to cover—[he] is the great amateur of English poetry... [he] always has the air of an ironic and urbane scholar chatting freely, perhaps a little indiscreetly, with his not very respectful pupils."

Sir Edmund Chambers noted that "in a comparison between the best works of Matthew Arnold and that of his six greatest contemporaries ... the proportion of work which endures is greater in the case of Matthew Arnold than in any one of them." Chambers judged Arnold's poetic vision by

its simplicity, lucidity, and straightforwardness; its literalness ...; the sparing use of aureate words, or of far-fetched words, which are all the more effective when they come; the avoidance of inversions, and the general directness of syntax, which gives full value to the delicacies of a varied rhythm, and makes it, of all verse that I know, the easiest to read aloud.

His 1867 poem "Dover Beach" depicted a nightmarish world from which the old religious verities have receded. It is sometimes held up as an early, if not the first, example of the modern sensibility. In a famous preface to a selection of the poems of William Wordsworth, Arnold identified, a little ironically, as a "Wordsworthian". The influence of Wordsworth, both in ideas and in diction, is unmistakable in Arnold's best poetry. "Dover Beach" is included in Ray Bradbury's novel Fahrenheit 451, and is featured prominently in the novel Saturday by Ian McEwan. It has been quoted or alluded to in a variety of other contexts (see Dover Beach). Henry James wrote that Arnold's poetry will appeal to those who "like their pleasures rare" and who like to hear the poet "taking breath". He derived the subject matter of his narrative poems from traditional or literary sources, and much of the romantic melancholy of his earlier poems from Senancour's "Obermann".

Arnold was keenly aware of his place in poetry. In an 1869 letter to his mother, he wrote:

My poems represent, on the whole, the main movement of mind of the last quarter of a century, and thus they will probably have their day as people become conscious to themselves of what that movement of mind is, and interested in the literary productions which reflect it. It might be fairly urged that I have less poetical sentiment than Tennyson and less intellectual vigour and abundance than Browning; yet because I have perhaps more of a fusion of the two than either of them, and have more regularly applied that fusion to the main line of modern development, I am likely enough to have my turn as they have had theirs.

Stefan Collini regards this as "an exceptionally frank, but not unjust, self-assessment. ... Arnold's poetry continues to have scholarly attention lavished upon it, in part because it seems to furnish such striking evidence for several central aspects of the intellectual history of the nineteenth century, especially the corrosion of 'Faith' by 'Doubt'. No poet, presumably, would wish to be summoned by later ages merely as an historical witness, but the sheer intellectual grasp of Arnold's verse renders it peculiarly liable to this treatment."

== Prose ==
Assessing the importance of Arnold's prose work in 1988, Stefan Collini stated, "for reasons to do with our own cultural preoccupations as much as with the merits of his writing, the best of his prose has a claim on us today that cannot be matched by his poetry." "Certainly there may still be some readers who, vaguely recalling 'Dover Beach' or 'The Scholar Gipsy' from school anthologies, are surprised to find he 'also' wrote prose."

The scholar George Watson follows George Saintsbury in dividing Arnold's career as a prose writer into three phases: first his early literary criticism, beginning with his preface to the 1853 edition of his poems and ending in 1865 with the first series of Essays in Criticism; second, a prolonged middle period characterised by social, political and religious writing, roughly 1860–1875; and third, a return to literary criticism with the selecting and editing of collections of Wordsworth's and Byron's poetry and the second series of Essays in Criticism in 1888. Both Watson and Saintsbury declare their preference for Arnold's literary criticism over his social or religious criticism. More recent writers, such as Collini, have shown a greater interest in his social writing, while over the years a significant second tier of criticism has focused on Arnold's religious writing. His writing on education has not drawn a significant critical endeavour separable from the criticism of his social writings.

=== Literary criticism ===
Arnold's work as a literary critic began with the 1853 "Preface to the Poems". In it, he attempted to explain his extreme act of self-censorship in excluding the dramatic poem "Empedocles on Etna". With its emphasis on the importance of subject in poetry, on "clearness of arrangement, rigor of development, simplicity of style" learned from the Greeks, and in the strong imprint of Goethe and Wordsworth, may be observed nearly all the essential elements in his critical theory. George Watson described the preface, written by the thirty-one-year-old Arnold, as "oddly stiff and graceless when we think of the ironic elegance of his later prose."

Criticism began to take first place in Arnold's writing with his appointment in 1857 to the professorship of poetry at Oxford, which he held for two successive terms of five years. In 1861 his lectures On Translating Homer were published, to be followed in 1862 by Last Words on Translating Homer. Especially characteristic, both of his defects and his qualities, are on the one hand, Arnold's unconvincing advocacy of English hexameters and his creation of a kind of literary absolute in the "grand style," and, on the other, his keen feeling of the need for a disinterested and intelligent criticism in England.

Although Arnold's poetry received only mixed reviews and attention during his lifetime, his forays into literary criticism were more successful. Arnold is famous for introducing a methodology of literary criticism somewhere between the historicist approach common to many critics at the time and the personal essay; he often moved quickly and easily from literary subjects to political and social issues. His Essays in Criticism (1865, 1888), remains a significant influence on critics to this day, and his prefatory essay to that collection, "The Function of Criticism at the Present Time", is one of the most influential essays written on the role of the critic in identifying and elevating literature—even while saying, "The critical power is of lower rank than the creative." Comparing himself to the French liberal essayist Ernest Renan, who sought to inculcate morality in France, Arnold saw his role as inculcating intelligence in England. In one of his most famous essays on the topic, "The Study of Poetry", Arnold wrote that, "Without poetry, our science will appear incomplete; and most of what now passes with us for religion and philosophy will be replaced by poetry". He considered the most important criteria used to judge the value of a poem were "high truth" and "high seriousness". By this standard, Chaucer's Canterbury Tales did not merit Arnold's approval. Further, Arnold thought the works that had been proven to possess both "high truth" and "high seriousness", such as those of Shakespeare and Milton, could be used as a basis of comparison to determine the merit of other works of poetry. He also sought for literary criticism to remain disinterested, and said that the appreciation should be of "the object as in itself it really is."

Though unable to speak any of the Celtic languages Arnold maintained an interest in the Celtic-language literatures of Ireland and Wales, and his On the Study of Celtic Literature, first published in 1867, led him to be regarded as an expert in the field, though now it is usually viewed as an expression of colonialist attitudes towards its subject.

=== Social criticism ===
He was led on from literary criticism to a more general critique of the spirit of his age. Between 1867 and 1869 he wrote Culture and Anarchy, famous for the term he popularised for the middle class of the English Victorian era population: "Philistines", a word which derives its modern cultural meaning (in English—the German-language usage was well established) from him. Culture and Anarchy is also famous for its popularisation of the phrase "sweetness and light", first coined by Jonathan Swift.

In Culture and Anarchy, Arnold identifies himself as a Liberal and "a believer in culture" and takes up what historian Richard Bellamy calls the "broadly Gladstonian effort to transform the Liberal Party into a vehicle of political moralism." Arnold viewed with scepticism the plutocratic grasping in socioeconomic affairs, and engaged the questions which vexed many Victorian liberals on the nature of power and the state's role in moral guidance. Arnold vigorously attacked the Nonconformists and the arrogance of "the great Philistine middle-class, the master force in our politics." The Philistines were "humdrum people, slaves to routine, enemies to light" who believed that England's greatness was due to her material wealth alone and took little interest in culture. Liberal education was essential, and by that Arnold meant a close reading and attachment to the cultural classics, coupled with critical reflection. Arnold saw the "experience" and "reflection" of Liberalism as naturally leading to the ethical end of "renouncement," as evoking the "best self" to suppress one's "ordinary self." Despite his quarrels with the Nonconformists, Arnold remained a loyal Liberal throughout his life, and in 1883, William Gladstone awarded him an annual pension of 250 pounds "as a public recognition of service to the poetry and literature of England."

Many subsequent critics such as Edward Alexander, Lionel Trilling, George Scialabba and Russell Jacoby have emphasised the liberal character of Arnold's thought. Hugh Stuart Jones describes Arnold's work as a "liberal critique of Victorian liberalism" while Alan S. Kahan places Arnold's critique of middle-class philistinism, materialism, and mediocrity within the tradition of 'aristocratic liberalism' as exemplified by liberal thinkers such as John Stuart Mill and Alexis de Tocqueville.

Arnold's "want of logic and thoroughness of thought" as noted by John M. Robertson in Modern Humanists was an aspect of the inconsistency of which Arnold was accused. Few of his ideas were his own, and he failed to reconcile the conflicting influences which moved him so strongly. "There are four people, in especial," he once wrote to Cardinal Newman, "from whom I am conscious of having learnt—a very different thing from merely receiving a strong impression—learnt habits, methods, ruling ideas, which are constantly with me; and the four are—Goethe, Wordsworth, Sainte-Beuve, and yourself." Dr. Arnold must be added; the son's fundamental likeness to the father was early pointed out by Swinburne, and was later attested by Matthew Arnold's grandson, Mr. Arnold Whitridge. Others such as Stefan Collini suggest that much of the criticism aimed at Arnold is based on "a convenient parody of what he is supposed to have stood for" rather than the genuine article.

=== Journalistic criticism ===
In 1887, Arnold was credited with coining the phrase "New Journalism", a term that went on to define an entire genre of newspaper history, particularly Lord Northcliffe's turn-of-the-century press empire. However, at the time, the target of Arnold's irritation was not Northcliffe, but the sensational journalism of Pall Mall Gazette editor, W. T. Stead. Arnold had enjoyed a long and mutually beneficial association with the Pall Mall Gazette since its inception in 1865. As an occasional contributor, he had formed a particular friendship with its first editor, Frederick Greenwood and a close acquaintance with its second, John Morley. But he strongly disapproved of the muck-raking Stead, and declared that, under Stead, "the P.M.G., whatever may be its merits, is fast ceasing to be literature."

He was appalled at the shamelessness of the sensationalistic new journalism of the sort he witnessed on his tour of the United States in 1886. In his account of that tour, "Civilization in the United States", he observed, "if one were searching for the best means to efface and kill in a whole nation the discipline of self-respect, the feeling for what is elevated, he could do no better than take the American newspapers."

=== Religious criticism ===
His religious views were unusual for his time and caused sorrow to some of his best friends. Scholars of Arnold's works disagree on the nature of Arnold's personal religious beliefs. Under the influence of Baruch Spinoza and his father, Dr. Thomas Arnold, he rejected the supernatural elements in religion, even while retaining a fascination for church rituals. In the preface to God and the Bible, written in 1875, Arnold recounts a powerful sermon he attended discussing the "salvation by Jesus Christ", writing, "Never let us deny to this story power and pathos, or treat with hostility ideas which have entered so deep into the life of Christendom. But the story is not true; it never really happened".

He continues to express his concern with the historicity of the Bible, explaining that "The personages of the Christian heaven and their conversations are no more matter of fact than the personages of the Greek Olympus and their conversations." He also wrote in Literature and Dogma: "The word 'God' is used in most cases as by no means a term of science or exact knowledge, but a term of poetry and eloquence, a term thrown out, so to speak, as a not fully grasped object of the speaker's consciousness—a literary term, in short; and mankind mean different things by it as their consciousness differs." He defined religion as "morality touched with emotion".

However, he also wrote in the same book, "to pass from a Christianity relying on its miracles to a Christianity relying on its natural truth is a great change. It can only be brought about by those whose attachment to Christianity is such, that they cannot part with it, and yet cannot but deal with it sincerely."

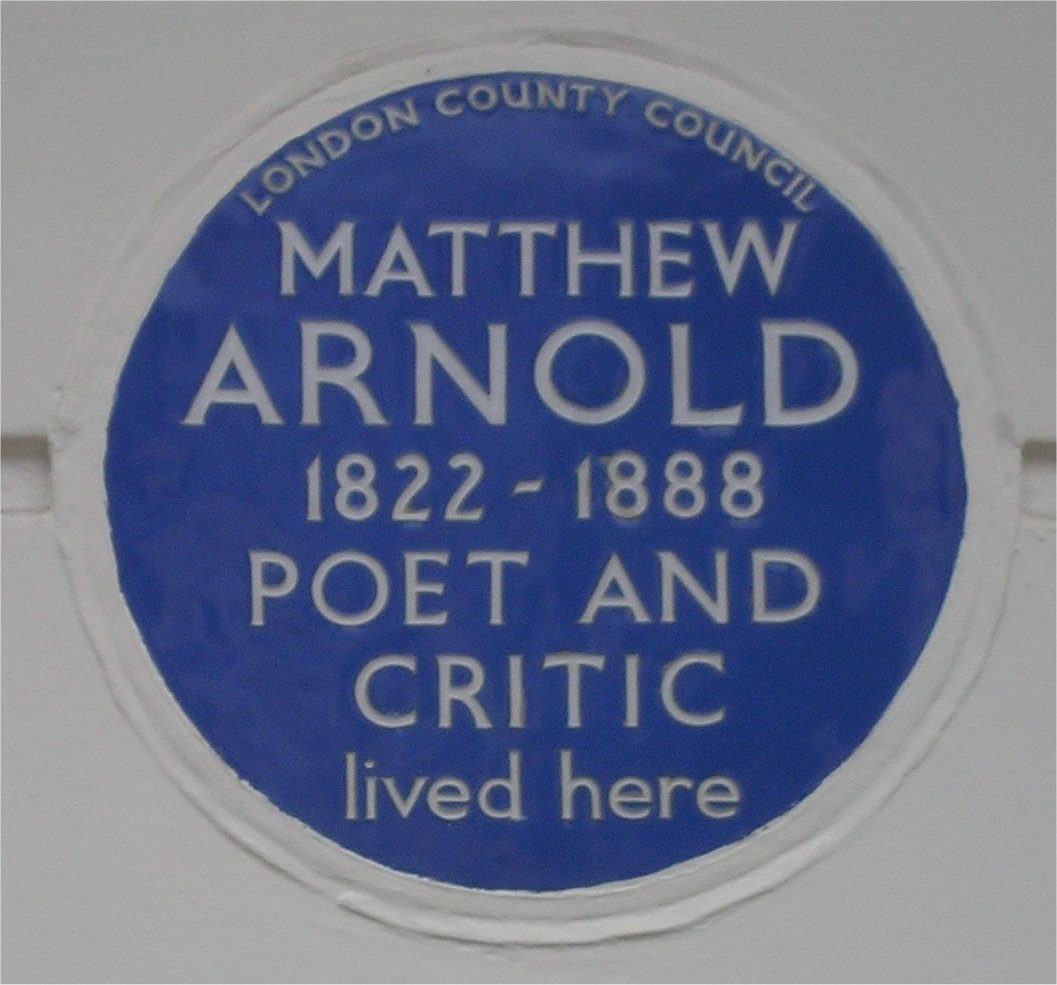
A London County Council blue plaque for Arnold at 2 Chester Square, Belgravia

== Forgeries of his Work ==
Thomas J Wise forged three pamphlets from Arnold's published material: Alaric at Rome (1840), Geist's Grave (1881), and Saint Brandan (1867).

The first, Alaric at Rome, is identifiable from the kernless 'f' and 'j' characters distinctive to the Clay's Long Primer No 3 font used in many other Wise forgeries. Other copies of Alaric at Rome in other fonts are probably not forgeries. John Carter and Graham Pollard conclude the other two titles are "highly suspicious" due to their type, auction records, sales by Herbert Gorfin, and absence from bibliographies. Carter later concludes that all three were printed by Wise's clandestine printer, Richard Clay in London.

== Family ==
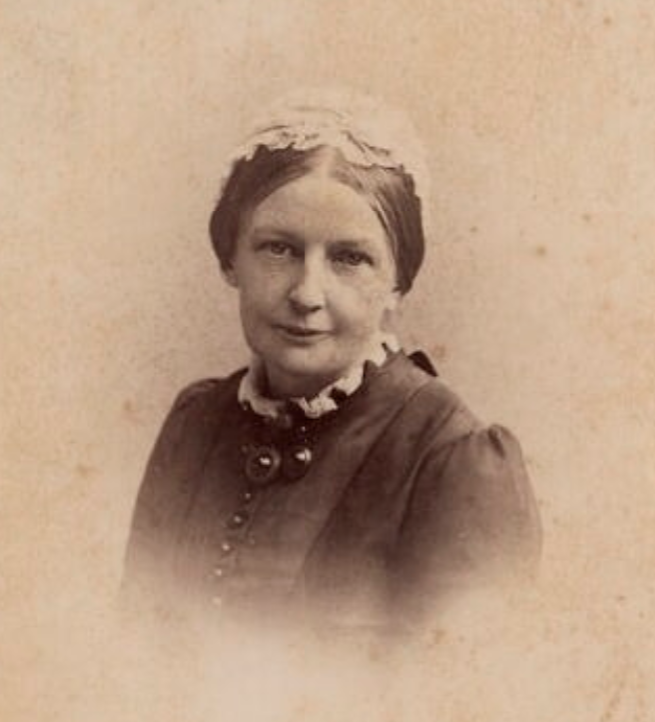
Frances Lucy Arnold—"Flu" to Matthew—1883 photograph

The Arnolds had six children:

- Thomas (1852–1868);
- Trevenen William (1853–1872);
- Richard Penrose (1855–1908), an inspector of factories; (Note: Composer Edward Elgar dedicated one of the Enigma Variations to Richard.)
- Lucy Charlotte (1858–1934), who married Frederick W. Whitridge of New York, whom she had met during Arnold's American lecture tour;
- Eleanore Mary Caroline (1861–1936) married (1) Hon. Armine Wodehouse (MP) in 1889, (2) William Mansfield, 1st Viscount Sandhurst, in 1909;
- Basil Francis (1866–1868).

== Selected bibliography ==
=== Poetry ===
- Stanzas in Memory of the Author of "Obermann" (1849)
- The Strayed Reveller, and Other Poems (1849)
- Memorial Verses to Wordsworth (1850)
- Empedocles on Etna, and Other Poems (1852)
- Sohrab and Rustum (1853)
- The Scholar-Gipsy (1853)
- Stanzas from the Grande Chartreuse (1855)
- Rugby Chapel (1867)
- Thyrsis (1865)

=== Prose ===
- Essays in Criticism (1865, 1888)
- On the Study of Celtic Literature (1867)
- Culture and Anarchy (1869)
- Friendship's Garland (1871)
- Literature and Dogma (1873)
- God and the Bible (1875)
- The Study Of Poetry (1880)

== See also ==
- Historian's fallacy
