= 2000 in poetry =

Nationality words link to articles with information on the nation's poetry or literature (for instance, Irish or France).

== Events ==
- Griffin Poetry Prize is established, with one award given each year for the best work by a Canadian poet and one award given for best work in the English language internationally.
- February — Janice Mirikitani succeeds Lawrence Ferlinghetti as San Francisco's Poet Laureate
- April 17 - New Jersey Governor Christine Todd Whitman appoints poet Gerald Stern to be the first Poet Laureate of New Jersey
- October 3 — Edward Lear's "The Owl and the Pussycat" named Britain's favorite children's poem in a BBC poll
- October 3 — Justin Trudeau quotes from Robert Frost's "Stopping by Woods" at the funeral of his father, former Canadian Prime Minister Pierre Trudeau
- October 4 — National Poetry Day in Great Britain: 300 school children at the Royal Festival Hall along with 4,000 other people nationwide perform Agbabi's "Word," setting a new Guinness World Record for simultaneous mass performance of a poem
- Spike Milligan made an honorary knight
- In the film Pandaemonium, released this year, the lives of William Wordsworth and Samuel Taylor Coleridge, in particular their collaboration on the "Lyrical Ballads," are discussed.

== Works published in English ==
Listed by nation where the work was first published and again by the poet's native land, if different; substantially revised works listed separately:

=== Australia ===
- Brook Emery, and dug my fingers in the sand, Five Islands Press. ISBN 0864186428
- Les Murray:
  - Learning Human: Selected Poems, Farrar Straus Giroux, also published as Learning Human, New Selected Poems, Carcanet, 2001shortlisted for the 2001 International Griffin Poetry Prize
  - An Absolutely Ordinary Rainbow
- Chris Wallace-Crabbe, The Poems, Brunswick: Gungurru
- Les Wicks, The Ways of Waves, Sidewalk

=== Canada ===
- Roo Borson, Introduction to the Introduction to Wang Wei, ISBN 1-894078-09-8 (by Pain Not Bread) American-Canadian
- Clint Burnham, Buddyland (Coach House Books) ISBN 978-1-55245-022-2
- Margaret Christakos:
  - Wipe Under A Love (Toronto: The Mansfield Press)
  - Charisma (Toronto: Pedlar Press)
- George Elliott Clarke, Whylah Falls, Vancouver: Polestar, revised edition of book which originally appeared in 1990, ISBN 1-896095-50-X (revised edition number) Canada
- Louis Dudek, The Surface of Time. Montreal: Empyreal.
- Claire Harris, She, Trinidadian-born, Canadian
- Don McKay, Another Gravity (Canada)
- John Pass, Water Stair (ISBN 0-88982-179-8) Canada
- Anne Simpson, Light Falls Through You, winner of the Gerald Lampert Award and the Atlantic Poetry Prize) ISBN 0-7710-8077-8, Canada
- Raymond Souster, Of Time & Toronto. Ottawa: Oberon Press.

==== Anthologies in Canada ====
- Ayanna Black, editor, Fiery Spirits & Voices: Canadian Writers of African Descent, Toronto: HarperPerennialCanada
- Wanda Campbell, editor, Susan Atkinson and Tanya Butler, assistant editors, Hidden Rooms: Early Canadian Women Poets, London, Ontario: Canadian Poetry Press
- Sophia Kaszuba, Sian Meikle, and Ian Lancashire, editors, Canadian Poets University of Toronto English Library, including these poets:

Milton Acorn, Margaret Atwood, Margaret Avison, Earle Birney, bill bissett, Marianne Bluger, Stephanie Bolster, Roo Borson, George Bowering, Dionne Brand, Ron Charach, Lesley Choyce, Peter Christensen, Afua Cooper, Don Coles, John Robert Colombo, Lynn Crosbie, Lorna Crozier, Michael Crummey, Jeffery Donaldson, Jennifer Footman, Sky Gilbert, Susan Glickman, Maureen Harris, Elisabeth Harvor, Jan Horner, Susan Ioannou, Ellen Jaffe, Adeena Karasick, Penn Kemp, A. M. Klein, Irving Layton, Noah Leznoff, Dennis Lee, Pat Lowther, Laura Lush, Gwendolyn MacEwen, Kim Maltman, Dave Margoshes, David W. McFadden, Susan McMaster, Bruce Meyer, Anne Michaels, Kim Morrissey, Erín Moure, Susan Musgrave, John Newlove, P. K. Page, E. J. Pratt, Robert Priest, Janis Rapoport, Wayne Scott Ray, Michael Redhill, John Reibetanz, D. C. Reid, Harold Rhenisch, Stan Rogal, Linda Rogers, Joe Rosenblatt, Jay Ruzesky, Richard Sanger, F. R. Scott, Peter Dale Scott, Kathy Shaidle, Kenneth Sherman, Carolyn Smart, Sandy Shreve, John Steffler, Nathalie Stephens, Rosemary Sullivan, Robert Sward, Rhea Tregebov, Jane Urquhart, R. M. Vaughan, Fred Wah, Tom Wayman, Natalie Wilson, Eddy Yanofsky

=== India, in English ===
- Sujata Bhatt, Augatora ( Poetry in English ), Carcanet Press
- Keki Daruwalla, Night River ( Poetry in English ), New Delhi: Rupa & Co.
- Ranjit Hoskote, The Cartographer's Apprentice ( Poetry in English ), (with drawings by Laxman Shreshtha), Mumbai: The Pundole Art Gallery
- Tabish Khair, Where Parallel Lines Meet ( Poetry in English ), New Delhi: Penguin-Viking, ISBN 978-0-670-89432-1; New York City: Allen Lane, ISBN 0-670-89432-X

- Sudeep Sen:
  - Almanac, Columbia: University of South Carolina
  - Lines of Desire, Columbia: University of South Carolina
  - A Blank Letter, Dhaka: The High Commission of India
- K. Satchidanandan, Imperfect and Other New Poems, Kozhikode, Kerala: Olive Publications
- Dilip Chitre, No Moon Monday on the River Karha, Pune: Vijaya Chitre

=== New Zealand ===
- Fleur Adcock (New Zealand poet who moved to England in 1963), Poems 1960–2000, Newcastle upon Tyne: Bloodaxe Books
- Nick Ascroft, From the Author Of
- Jenny Bornholdt, These Days
- Glenn Colquhoun, An Explanation of Poetry to My Father
- Paula Green, Chrome
- Murray Edmond, Laminations
- Andrew Johnston, Birds of Europe
- Cilla McQueen, Markings, poetry and drawings, Otago University Press
- Stephanie de Montalk, Animals Indoors, Victoria University Press

==== Anthologies in New Zealand ====
- Jenny Bornholdt and Gregory O'Brien, editors, My Heart Goes Swimming: New Zealand Love Poems, Random House New Zealand ISBN 0-908877-81-1, ISBN 978-0-908877-81-2
- Alan Brunton, Murray Edmond, Michele Leggott, editors, Big Smoke: New Zealand Poems 1960–1975, Auckland: Auckland University Press
- Lauris Edmond, editor, New Zealand Love Poems: An Oxford Anthology, posthumous

=== United Kingdom ===
- Fleur Adcock (New Zealand poet who moved to England in 1963), Poems 1960–2000, Newcastle upon Tyne: Bloodaxe Books
- Gerry Cambridge, The Praise of Swans (pamphlet, 28 pp), Shoestring Press, ISBN 1-899549-49-8
- Robert Crawford and Mick Imlah, editors, The New Penguin Book of Scottish Verse, London: Allen Lane, Penguin Press ISBN 978-0-14-058711-1(anthology)
- Carol Ann Duffy, The Oldest Girl in the World, Faber and Faber (children's poetry)
- U. A. Fanthorpe, Consequences
- James Fenton: The Strength of Poetry: Oxford Lectures
- James Fenton (Ulster Scots poet), Thonner an Thon: an Ulster-Scots collection, Ulster Scots dialect poet living and published in Northern Ireland
- Elaine Feinstein, Gold, Carcanet
- Thom Gunn:
  - Boss Cupid
  - Collected Poems
- Glyn Maxwell, The Boys at Twilight: Poems, 1990–1995, Houghton Mifflin (a New York Times "notable book of the year"), Briton and poetry editor of The New Republic living in the United States
- Craig Raine, A la Recherche du Temps Perdu
- Peter Reading, Marfan
- Maurice Riordan, Irish poet living and published in the United Kingdom:
  - Floods, Faber and Faber
  - Editor, with Jon Turney (a science journalist), A Quark for Mister Mark: 101 Poems about Science, anthology, Faber and Faber
- Jo Shapcott, Her Book
- Sulpicia, The Poems of Sulpicia, ancient Roman poet translated by John Heath-Stubbs

=== United States ===
- John Ashbery:
  - Your Name Here
  - As Umbrellas Follow Rain
- Bei Dao, Unlock, English translation by Eliot Weinberger & Iona Man-Cheong (New Directions) ISBN 0-8112-1447-8
- Edward Brathwaite, Words Need Love Too, Barbadian poet living in the United States
- Joseph Brodsky: Collected Poems in English, 1972–1999, edited by Ann Kjellberg, New York: Farrar, Straus & Giroux Russian-American; Farrar, Straus & Giroux (a New York Times "notable book of the year")
- Gwendolyn Brooks, In Montgomery
- Anne Carson, Men in the Off Hours, Knopf (a New York Times "notable book of the year")
- Paul Celan, Glottal Stop: 101 Poems by Paul Celan (Translated by Heather McHugh and Nikolai Popov)
- Anita Endreszze, Throwing Fire at the Sun, Water at the Moon, combination of fiction, nonfiction and poetry, Tucson, Arizona: University of Arizona Press
- Michael S. Harper, Songlines in Michaeltree: New and Collected Poems
- Fanny Howe, Fanny Howe: Selected Poems
- Kenneth Koch, New Addresses: Poems, Knopf (a New York Times "notable book of the year")
- Stanley Kunitz, The Collected Poems, Norton (a New York Times "notable book of the year")
- Stanley Lombardo (translator), Odyssey by Homer, Hackett (a New York Times "notable book of the year")
- Glyn Maxwell, The Boys at Twilight: Poems, 1990–1995, Houghton Mifflin (a New York Times "notable book of the year"), Briton and poetry editor of The New Republic living in the United States
- Constance Merritt, A Protocol for Touch: Vassar Miller Prize in Poetry, selected by Eleanor Wilner
- W. S. Merwin, translation, Purgatorio from The Divine Comedy of Dante; New York: Knopf; (a New York Times "notable book of the year")
- Grazyna Miller, Sull'onda del respiro (On the Wave of Breath)
- Michael O'Brien, Sills: Selected Poems, Zoland
- Mary Oliver, The Leaf and the Cloud (prose poem)
- Grace Paley, Begin Again: Collected Poems
- Michael Palmer, The Promises of Glass
- Carl Phillips, Pastoral
- Robert Pinsky, Jersey Rain (Farrar, Straus & Giroux) (a New York Times "notable book of the year")
- Michael Ryan, A Difficult Grace: On Poets, Poetry, and Writing (essays)
- Gjertrud Schnackenberg:
  - The Throne of Labdacus, Farrar, Straus & Giroux (a New York Times "notable book of the year")
  - Supernatural Love: Poems 1976–1992, ISBN 0-374-52754-7
- Derek Walcott, The Prodigal (West Indian)
- Louis Zukofsky, Wesleyan University Press begins publishing The Wesleyan Centennial Edition of the Complete Critical Writings of Louis Zukofsky (posthumous)

==== Criticism, scholarship and biography in the United States ====
- John Ashbery, Other Traditions (Harvard University Press), thoughts on six poets (John Clare, Thomas Lovell Beddoes, Raymond Roussel, John Wheelwright, Laura Riding, and David Schubert); from his Charles Eliot Norton Lectures (criticism) ISBN 978-0-674-00315-6 ISBN 0-674-00315-2
- Alison Lurie, Familiar Spirits: A Memoir of James Merrill and David Jackson
- Helen Vendler, Seamus Heaney, ISBN 0-674-00205-9

==== Anthologies in the United States ====
- Stephen Berg, David Bonanno, and Arthur Vogelsang, editors, The Body Electric, anthology of poetry published in The American Poetry Review, 1972–1999.(W.W. Norton & Company), 820 pages
- American Poetry: The Twentieth Century, two volumes, The Library of America (Henry Adams to May Swenson)
- Cary Nelson, editor, Anthology of Modern American Poetry, Oxford University Press (also published in the United Kingdom)
- Jeffrey Paine, Kwame Anthony Appiah, Sven Birkerts, Joseph Brodsky, Carolyn Forché, and Helen Vendler, editors, The Poetry of Our World: an International Anthology of Contemporary Poetry, New York: HarperCollins

===== Poets appearing in The Best American Poetry 2000 =====
These 75 poets had poems published in The Best American Poetry 2000, edited by David Lehman, with Rita Dove as guest editor:

- Kim Addonizio
- Pamela Alexander
- A. R. Ammons
- Julianna Baggott
- Erin Belieu
- Richard Blanco
- Janet Bowdan
- Grace Butcher
- Lucille Clifton
- Billy Collins
- Jim Daniels
- Gregory Djanikian
- Denise Duhamel
- Christopher Edgar
- Karl Elder
- Lynn Emanuel
- B. H. Fairchild
- Charles Fort
- Frank X. Gaspar
- Elton Glaser
- Ray Gonzalez
- Jennifer Grotz
- Thom Gunn
- Mark Halliday
- Barbara Hamby
- Forrest Hamer
- Brenda Hillman
- Marsha Janson
- Mark Jarman
- Patricia Spears Jones
- Rodney Jones
- Donald Justice
- Olena Kalytiak Davis
- David Kirby
- Carolyn Kizer
- Lynne Knight
- Yusef Komunyakaa
- Thomas Lux
- Lynne McMahon
- W. S. Merwin
- Susan Mitchell
- Jean Nordhaus
- Mary Oliver
- Michael Palmer
- Paul Perry
- Carl Phillips
- Robert Pinsky
- Donald Platt
- Stanley Plumly
- Lawrence Raab
- Thomas Rabbitt
- Mary Jo Salter
- Rebecca Seiferle
- Brenda Shaughnessy
- Laurie Sheck
- Reginald Shepherd
- Rudy Delgado Jr.
- Cathy Song
- Gary Soto
- Gabriel Spera
- A. E. Stallings
- Susan Stewart
- Adrienne Su
- Pamela Sutton
- Dorothea Tanning
- Natasha Trethewey
- Quincy Troupe
- Reetika Vazirani
- Paul Violi
- Derek Walcott
- Richard Wilbur
- Susan Wood
- John Yau
- Dean Young

=== Other in English ===
- Edward Brathwaite, Words Need Love Too, Barbadian poet living in the United States
- Moya Cannon, Oar, Oldcastle: The Gallery Press, ISBN 978-1-85235-263-9 Ireland
- Claire Harris, She, Trinidadian-born, Canadian

== Works published in other languages ==
Listed by nation where the work was first published and again by the poet's native land, if different; substantially revised works listed separately:

=== China ===
- Yang Ke, editor, 2000 Yearbook of New Chinese Poetry (Zhongguo xinshi nianjian) (anthology)
- Yu Jian, China:
  - Shige • Biantiaoji (short poems)
  - Yu Jian de shi (poems and translations)

=== Denmark ===
- Klaus Høeck, fra Hjem, publisher: Gyldendal; Denmark
- Henrik Nordbrandt:
  - Drømmebroer ("Dream Bridges"), winner of the Nordic Council's Literature Prize (Denmark)
  - Egne digte ("Own Poems"), Copenhagen: Gylendal, 289 pages

=== French language ===
==== Canada, in French ====
- Denise Desautels, Tombeau de Lou, Montréal: Le Noroît
- Pierre Labrie, À tout hasard
- Madeleine Ouellette-Michalska, L'Amérique un peu/Au bord du rouge absolu, with James Sacré; Montréal: Trait d'union
- Jean Royer, Le visage des mots, Trois-Rivières: Écrits des Forges//Marchainville: Proverbe

==== France ====
- Andre du Bouchet, L'emportement du muet
- Seyhmus Dagtekin, Les chemins du nocturne, publisher: Le Castor Astral
- Abdellatif Laabi, Poèmes périssables, La Différence, coll. Clepsydre, Paris (épuisé), Moroccan author writing in French and published in France
- Jean-Claude Pinson, Fado (avec fantomes et flacons)
- Jacqueline Risset, Les instants

=== India ===
In each section, listed in alphabetical order by first name:

==== Bengali ====
- Joy Goswami:
  - Jogotbari, Kolkata: Ananda Publishers, ISBN 81-7756-107-3
  - Kabita-Songroho, Vol. 3, Kolkata: Ananda Publishers, ISBN 81-7756-088-3
- Debarati Mitra:
  - Tunnur Computer, Kolkata: Ananda Publishers
  - Srestha Kavita, Kolkata: Dey's Publishing
- Nirendranath Chakravarti; Bengali-language:
  - Shakulley Teenjon, Kolkata: Ananda Publishers
  - Joler Jailkhana Theke, Kolkata: Ananda Publishers

==== Hindi ====
- Anamika, Kavita Mein Aurat, Delhi: Itihas Bodh
- Teji Grover, Ant Ki Kucch Aur Kavitayen, New Delhi: Vani Prakashan
- Udayan Vajpeyi, Vie Invisible, translated and published in France; Lignon: Cheyne Editeur;

==== Other in India ====
- Amarjit Chandan; Punjabi-language:
  - Gurhti (in Persian script), Navyug, New Delhi
  - Anaran vala Vehra (in Persian script), Kitab Tirinjan, Lahore
- Chandrakant (Chandu) Shah, also known as Chandu Shah, Blue Jeans, Mumbai: Image Publications; Gujarati-language
- Jiban Narah, Ta-Ri-Ri, Guwahati, Assam: Bak; Indian, Assamese-language
- K. Satchidanandan, Sambhashanathinu Oru Sramam, ("An Attempt to Converse"); Malayalam-language
- K. Siva Reddy, Kavisamayam, Vijayawada: Sahiti Mitrulu; Telugu-language
- Kutti Revathi, Poonaiyai pola alaiyum velicham, ("Light Prowls Like a Cat"), Chennai: Thamizhini
- S. Joseph, Karutha Kallu, winner of the Kerala Sahitya Akademi Award; Kottayam: DC Books, ISBN 81-264-0205-9
- Prathibha Nandakumar, Aha! Purushakaram! ("Aha! The Human Form!"), Srirangapattana, Mandya district, Karnataka: Nelamane Prakashana
- Salma, Oru Maalaiyum Innoru Maalaiyum, Nagercoil: Kalachuvadu Pathippagam
- Varavara Rao (better known as "VV"), Unnadedo Unnattu ("As It Is"); Telugu-language

=== Bangladesh ===
- Rahman Henry, Prokrito Saros Urey Jae, A Book of Poetry in Bengali, Shraban, Shahbag, Dhaka. Bangladesh.

=== Poland ===
- Leszek Engelking, I inne wiersze (And Other Poems) Poland
- Czesław Miłosz, To ("It"); Kraków: Znak
- Eugeniusz Tkaczyszyn-Dycki, Przewodnik dla bezdomnych niezależnie od miejsca zamieszkania
- Jan Twardowski, Elementarz księdza Twardowskiego dla najmłodszego, średniaka i starszego, Kraków: Wydawnictwo Literackie

=== Serbia ===
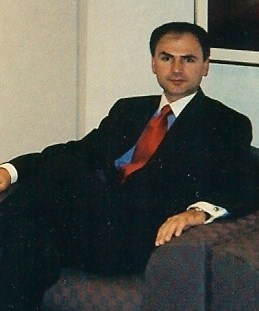
Dejan Stojanović in 2003, Chicago

- Dejan Stojanović:
  - Znak i njegova deca (The Sign and Its Children), Prosveta, Beograd
  - Oblik (The Shape), Gramatik, Podgorica, Montenegro
  - Tvoritelj (The Creator), Narodna knjiga–Alfa, Beograd
  - Krugovanje (Circling), Third Edition (poems added to the third edition), Narodna knjiga–Alfa, Beograd

=== Other ===
- Christoph Buchwald, general editor, and Ludwig Harig, guest editor, Jahrbuch der Lyrik 2001 ("Poetry Yearbook 2001"), publisher: Beck; anthology
- Matilde Camus, Prisma de emociones ("Prism of emotions"), Spain
- Faruk Šehić, Pjesme u Nastajanju ("Acquired Poems"), Bosnia
- Maria Luisa Spaziani, La freccia, Italy
- Yang Ke, editor, 2000 Yearbook of New Chinese Poetry Zhongguo xinshi nianjian, China (anthology)

== Awards and honors ==
=== Australia ===
- C. J. Dennis Prize for Poetry: John Millett, Iceman
- Kenneth Slessor Prize for Poetry: Jennifer Maiden, Mines
- Mary Gilmore Prize: Lucy Dougan, Memory Shell

=== Canada ===
- Gerald Lampert Award: Shawna Lemay, All the God-Sized Fruit
- Archibald Lampman Award: Stephanie Bolster, Two Bowls of Milk
- Atlantic Poetry Prize: Ken Babstock, Mean
- 2000 Governor General's Awards: Don McKay, Another Gravity (English); Normand de Bellefeuille, La Marche de l'aveugle sans son chien (French)
- Pat Lowther Award: Esta Spalding, Lost August
- Prix Alain-Grandbois: Normand de Bellefeuille, La Marche de l'aveugle sans son chien
- Dorothy Livesay Poetry Prize: Lorna Crozier, What the Living Won't Let Go
- Prix Émile-Nelligan: Tania Langlais, Douze bêtes aux chemises de l'homme

=== India ===
- Sahitya Akademi Award : Manglesh Dabral for Hum Jo Dekhte Hain
- Poetry Society India National Poetry Competition : Shahnaz Habib for Of Hypocrisy and Cheekbones & Revathy Gopal for I Would Know You Anywhere

=== New Zealand ===
- Prime Minister's Awards for Literary Achievement:
- Montana New Zealand Book Awards (no poetry winner this year):
  - First-book award for poetry: Glenn Colquhoun, The Art of Walking Upright, Steele Roberts
  - A.W. Reed Lifetime Achievement Award: Allen Curnow

=== United Kingdom ===
- Cholmondeley Award: Alistair Elliot, Michael Hamburger, Adrian Henri, Carole Satyamurti
- Eric Gregory Award: Eleanor Margolies, Antony Rowland, Antony Dunn, Karen Goodwin, Clare Pollard
- Forward Poetry Prize Best Collection: Michael Donaghy, Conjure (Picador)
- Forward Poetry Prize Best First Collection: Andrew Waterhouse, In (The Rialto)
- Samuel Johnson Prize: David Cairns, Berlioz: Volume 2
- Queen's Gold Medal for Poetry: Edwin Morgan
- T. S. Eliot Prize (United Kingdom and Ireland): Michael Longley, The Weather in Japan
- Whitbread Award for poetry: John Burnside, The Asylum Dance
- National Poetry Competition : Ian Duhig for The Lammas Hireling

=== United States ===
- Agnes Lynch Starrett Poetry Prize awarded to Quan Barry for Asylum
- Aiken Taylor Award for Modern American Poetry, Eleanor Ross Taylor
- Bernard F. Connors Prize for Poetry, Corey Marks, "Renunciation", and (separately) Christopher Patton, "Broken Ground"
- Bobbitt National Prize for Poetry, David Ferry for Of No Country I Know: New and Selected Poems and Translations
- Brittingham Prize in Poetry, Rudy Delgado Jr., A Path Between Houses
- Frost Medal: Anthony Hecht
- National Book Award for poetry: Lucille Clifton, Blessing the Boats: New and Selected Poems 1988–2000
- Poet Laureate Consultant in Poetry to the Library of Congress: Stanley Kunitz appointed
- Poet Laureate of Virginia: Grace Simpson, two year appointment 2000 to 2002
- Pulitzer Prize for Poetry: C.K. Williams, Repair
- Rhysling Award:
  - Geoffrey A. Landis, Christmas (after we all get time machines) (Long Form)
  - Rebecca Marjesdatter, Grimoire (Short Form)
- Robert Fitzgerald Prosody Award: T. V. F. Brogan
- Ruth Lilly Poetry Prize: Carl Dennis
- Wallace Stevens Award: Frank Bidart
- Whiting Awards: Albert Mobilio, James Thomas Stevens, Claude Wilkinson
- William Carlos Williams Award: Kathleen Peirce, The Oval Hour (Iowa Poetry Prize), Judge: Jean Valentine
- Fellowship of the Academy of American Poets: Lyn Hejinian

== Deaths ==
Birth years link to the corresponding "[year] in poetry" article:

- January 2 – Roland Flint, 66 (born 1934), American, of cancer
- January 22 – Anne Hébert, 83 (born 1916), Canadian, French language
- January 28 – Lauris Edmond, 75 (born 1924), New Zealand
- February 4 – Edgar Bowers, 75 (born 1924), American, of non-Hodgkin's lymphoma
- April 16 – John Bruce, 78 (born 1922) Canadian
- April 21
  - Douglas Oliver, 62 (born 1937), English, of prostate cancer
  - Al Purdy, 81 (born 1918), Canadian, of lung cancer
- May 14 – Karl Shapiro, 86 (born 1913), American
- September 25 – R. S. Thomas, 87 (born 1913), Anglo-Welsh poet and clergyman
- June 9 – Ernst Jandl, 74 (born 1925), Austrian poet, author and translator
- June 26 – Judith Wright, 85 (born 1915) Australian poet and environmental campaigner, of a heart attack
- July 13 – A. D. Hope, 92 (born 1907), Australian poet and satirist
- September 22 – Yehuda Amichai, 76 (born 1924), Israeli, Hebrew language
- November 14 – Libby Scheier, 54 (born 1946), Canadian, of breast cancer
- November 29 – William Scammell, 59 (born 1939), English
- December 3 – Gwendolyn Brooks, 83 (born 1917), American, of cancer
- December 20 – Adrian Henri, 68 (born 1932), English member of the Liverpool poets

== Notes ==
- "A Timeline of English Poetry" at the Representative Poetry Online website, University of Toronto

== See also ==
- Poetry
- List of years in poetry
- List of poetry awards
