= Indian poetry =

Poetry from India

Indian poetry and Indian literature in general, has a long history dating back to Vedic times. They were written in various Indian languages such as Vedic Sanskrit, Classical Sanskrit, Ancient Meitei, Modern Meitei, Telugu, Tamil, Odia, Maithili, Kannada, Bengali, Assamese, Hindi, Marathi and Urdu among other prominent languages. Poetry in foreign languages such as English also has a strong influence on Indian poetry. The poetry reflects diverse spiritual traditions within India. In particular, many Indian poets have been inspired by mystical experiences. Poetry is the oldest form of literature and has a rich written and oral tradition.

== Longest poems ==
Length (lines)	Original title(s)	Romanization	Literal meaning(s)	Original language(s)	Place(s) of origin	Author(s)	Genre(s)	Note(s)
1,00,000 couplets (2,00,000 lines)	महाभारतम्	Mahabharatam	The Great Bharatam	Sanskrit	Indian subcontinent	Vyasa	Sanskrit literature, Hinduism	
24,000 couplets (48,000 lines)	रामायणम्	Ramayanam	Rama’s Journey or Rama's progress	Sanskrit	Indian subcontinent	Valmiki	Sanskrit literature, Hinduism	
39,000 lines	ꯈꯝꯕ ꯊꯣꯏꯕꯤ ꯁꯩꯔꯦꯡ	Khamba Thoibi Sheireng	Poem on Khamba and Thoibi	Meitei language (officially called "Manipuri")	Manipur Kingdom	Hijam Anganghal	Epic cycles of incarnations in Moirang, Meitei literature	
5,730	சிலப்பதிகாரம்	Cilappatikaram	the Tale of an Anklet	Tamil language	Tamilakam	Ilango Adigal	Sangam literature	
4,861	மணிமேகலை	Manimekalai	jewelled belt, girdle of gems	Tamil language	Tamilakam	Chithalai Chathanar	Sangam literature, Buddhism	
3,145	சீவக சிந்தாமணி	Cīvaka Cintāmaṇi	Jivaka, the Fabulous Gem	Tamil language	Tamilakam	Tiruttakkatēvar	Sangam literature, Jainism	

== Indian poetry awards ==
There are very few literary awards in India for poetry alone. The prestigious awards like Jnanapeeth, Sahitya Akademi and Kalidas Samman etc. are given away to writers of both prose and poetry. Most of the awards have gone to novelists. Few poets have received these awards.

=== Jnanpith Award ===
Some of the poets who have won the Jnanpith award for their poetry include: Viswanatha Satyanarayana for his Sreemadraamaayana Kalpavrukshamu in Telugu (1970), Mahadevi Varma in Hindi for her collection of poems Yama, Firaq Gorakhpuri for his Gul-e-Naghma (1969), Amrita Pritam for her Kagaz te Kanvas (1981), Qurratulain Hyder for her Akhire Sab ke Humsafar, Singireddi Narayana Reddi for his Viswambhara in Telugu (1988), O. N. V. Kurup for his contribution to Malayalam poetry (2007) and Ravuri Bharadhwaja for his novel Paakuduraallu (Telugu) (2012).

=== Ananda Puraskar and Rabindra Puraskar ===
Ananda Bazar Patrika have instituted the annual Ananda Puraskar for Bengali literature. There is also Rabindra Puraskar. But these awards have usually gone to novelists. The rare poets to have won these awards include Premendra Mitra for Sagar Theke Phera (1957), Buddhadeb Basu for Swagato Biday (1974), Aruna Mitra for Suddhu Rater Shabda (1979), Joy Goswami for Ghumeichho (1990), Srijato for Uranto Sab Joker (2004) and Pinaki Thakur for Chumbaner Kshato (2012).

=== Sahitya Akademi Awards ===
Sahitya Akademi gives away annual prizes for both original works of poetry in the recognised Indian languages, as well as outstanding works of translation of Indian poetry. The award winners for English poetry include Jayanta Mahapatra for Relationship (1981), Nissim Ezekiel for Latter-Day Psalms (1983), Keki N. Daruwalla for The Keeper of the Dead (1984), Kamala Das for Collected Poems (1985), Shiv K. Kumar for Trapfalls in the Sky (1987), Dom Moraes for Serendip (1994), A. K. Ramanujan for Collected Poems (1999) and Jeet Thayil for These Errors are Correct (1912). Prominent Akademi awardees for poetry in other Indian languages include H. S. Shivaprakash (Kannada) and K. Satchidanandan (Malayalam). Other eminent Sahitya Akademi award-winning poets include Amrita Pritam (Punjabi) for Sunehe (1956), V. K. Gokak (Kannada) for Divya Prithvi (1960), G. Sankara Kurup (Malayalam) for Viswadarshanam (1963), Makhanlal Chaturvedi for Him Tarangini in Hindi, Kusumagraj (Marathi) for Natsamrat (1974), Kaifi Azmi (Urdu) for Awara Sajde (1975), Sunil Gangopadhyay (Bengali) for Sei Somoy (1984), Kanhaiyalal Sethia (Rajasthani) for Lilatamsa (1984), Hiren Bhattacharyya (Assamese) for Saichor Pathar Manuh (1992), Gunturu Seshendra Sarma (Telugu) for Kaala Rekha (1994), Srinivas Rath (Sanskrit) for Tadaiva Gaganam Shaivadhara (1999) and Pratibha Satpathy (Odia) for Tanmaya Dhuli (2001).

Eighteen poets have won Sahitya Akademi Awards in Telugu language.

=== Indian Literature Golden Jubilee Poetry Awards ===
On the occasion of its Golden Jubilee, Sahitya Akademi awarded the following prizes for outstanding works of poetry in translation from Indian languages.

- Rana Nayar for his translation of the verses of the Sikh saint Baba Farid from Punjabi.
- Tapan Kumar Pradhan for English translation of his own Odia poem collection Kalahandi
- Paromita Das for English translation of Parvati Prasad Baruwa's poems in Assamese.

The Golden Jubilee Prize for Life Time Achievement was won by Namdeo Dhasal, Ranjit Hoskote, Neelakshi Singh, Abdul Rashid and Sithara S.

=== All India Poetry Champions ===
The Poetry Society (India) gives annual awards solely for poetry. The following poets have won the annual prizes instituted by the Poetry Society (India) in collaboration with British Council and Ministry of Human Resource Development (India):

- 1988: Vijay Nambisan for "Madras Central"
- 1990: Rukmini Bhaya Nair for "Kali"
- 1991: Rajlukshmee Debee Bhattacharya for "Punarnava"
- 1993: Shampa Sinha for "Siesta"; Tarun Cherian for "A Writer's Prayer"
- 1994: Anju Makhija for "A Farmer's Ghost"; Smita Agarwal for "Our Foster Nurse of Nature is Repose"
- 1995: Tabish Khair for "Birds of North Europe"; Gopi Krishnan Kottoor for "The Coffin Maker"
- 1997: Ranjit Hoskote for "Portrait of a Lady"; Gopi Kottoor for "Digging"
- 1998: K. Sri Lata for "In Santa Cruz, Diagnosed Home Sick"
- 2000: Shahnaz Habib for "Of Hypocrisy and Cheekbones"; Revathy Gopal for "I Would Know You Anywhere"
- 2013: Mathew John for "Another Letter from Another Father to Another Son"; Tapan Kumar Pradhan for "The Buddha Smiled"

== Western thinkers and poets interested in Indian poetry ==
In the 19th century, American Transcendentalist writers and many German Romantic writers became interested in Indian poetry, literature and thought. In the 20th century, few Western poets became interested in Indian thought and literature, and the interest of many of those was minor: T. S. Eliot studied Sanskrit at Harvard, but later lost interest. Buddhism brought Allen Ginsberg and Gary Snyder to India, but they became more interested in Tibetan and Japanese forms of the religion. Mexican poet and writer Octavio Paz developed a strong, lasting interest in Indian poetry after living in the country as part of the Mexican diplomatic mission (and as ambassador in the 1960s). Paz married an Indian woman, translated Sanskrit kavyas, and wrote extensively about India.

== See also ==
- List of Indian poets
- The Poetry Society (India)
- Indian literature
- List of Indian English poetry anthologies
- Journal : Indian Literature
- Sahitya Akademi Award
- Kavishala
