= Johan Anders Höglund =

Johan Anders Höglund (born 1967) is a Swedish academic, postcolonial scholar and cultural critic. He is professor of English Literature at Linnaeus University and former director of the Linnaeus University Centre for Concurrences in Colonial and Postcolonial Studies. He received an MA from Brown University, Rhode Island in 1994, and a PhD from Uppsala University, Sweden, in 1997. He is best known for his work on the relationship between American gothic narratives and the long history of US imperialism, and on the Military First-Person Shooter. He has also written about Animal Horror Cinema, Nordic Gothic, British Invasion literature before WWI, and on the turn-of-the-century British author Richard Marsh. He has cooperated with Gothic scholar Justin D. Edwards and Indian writer and scholar Tabish Khair. He currently lives in Kalmar, Sweden.

== Career ==
Höglund received an MA from Brown University, Rhode Island in 1994, and a PhD from Uppsala University, Sweden, in 1997.

His doctoral dissertation Mobilizing the Novel: The Literature of Imperialism and the First World War focuses on pre-WWI British military and gothic invasion narratives such as William Le Queux's The Invasion of 1910 (1906), Bram Stoker's Dracula (1897) and Richard Marsh's The Beetle. Since 2005, Höglund's work on British turn-of-the-century writing has mostly concerned the fiction of Richard Marsh and its discussion of race, innate criminality and eugenics.

Höglund has written about the connection between military digital games, US neo-colonialism and the Military industrial entertainment complex. Höglund has also studied how the history of WWII and the ideology of Nazism is represented in the Call of Duty franchise.

Building on Patrick's Brantlinger's observation in Rule of Darkness, British Literature and Imperialism, 1830-1914 that the late nineteenth century gothic novel was a vehicle of imperial sentiment, Höglund argues that American Gothic has been imperial since its inception in the late eighteenth century. In his book The American Imperial Gothic: Popular Culture, Empire Violence, Höglund traces this development from the publication of Charles Brockden Brown's Edgar Huntly in 1799, to the early years of the Barack Obama presidency.

== Selected works ==
- Dark Scenes from Damaged Earth (2022) (edited with Justin D. Edwards and Rune Graulund ISBN 978-1-5179-1123-2
- Nordic Gothic (2020) (edited with Maria Holmgren Troy, Yvonne Leffler, Sofia Wijkmark ISBN 978-1-5261-2643-6
- B-Movie Gothic: International Perspectives (2018) (edited with Justin D. Edwards). ISBN 978-1-474-42344-1.
- Animal Horror Cinema: Genre, History and Criticism (2015) (edited with Katarina Gregersdotter and Niklas Hållén). ISBN 978-1-137-49638-6.
- The American Imperial Gothic: Popular Culture, Empire Violence (2014). ISBN 978-1-409-44954-6.
- Transnational and Postcolonial Vampires: Dark Blood (2012) (edited with Tabish Khair). ISBN 978-1-137-27262-1.
- Mobilizing the Novel: The Literature of Imperialism and the First World War (1997). ISBN 915-5-44068-1.
