= Lakshahira Das =

Lakshahira Das (1931-2025) was an Indian writer, singer and professor. She became the first female artist to receive AIR approval in 1948. She won a Sangeet Natak Akademi Award in 2022. She wrote 50 books and composed a number of songs throughout her career.

Das was a member of the Sahitya Akademi, the Poetry Society of India and the Asam Sahitya Sabha. She was a head professor at the Gauhati University.
