= Rangarajan =

Rangarajan is an Indian surname and may refer to

- C. Rangarajan, Indian economist, former Governor of the Reserve Bank of India
- G. N. Rangarajan, Indian film director and writer
- Mahesh Rangarajan, Indian author and historian
- Manakkal Rangarajan, Carnatic singer from India
- Ra. Ki. Rangarajan, Indian writer
- S. Rangarajan, Indian journalist
- Sujatha Rangarajan, Indian writer and novelist
- Swarnalatha Rangarajan, Indian academic and writer
- Rangarajan Kumaramangalam, Indian politician
- Sudhangan, Indian journalist and editor also known by his birth name Rangarajan
