= Adventure film =

Film genre

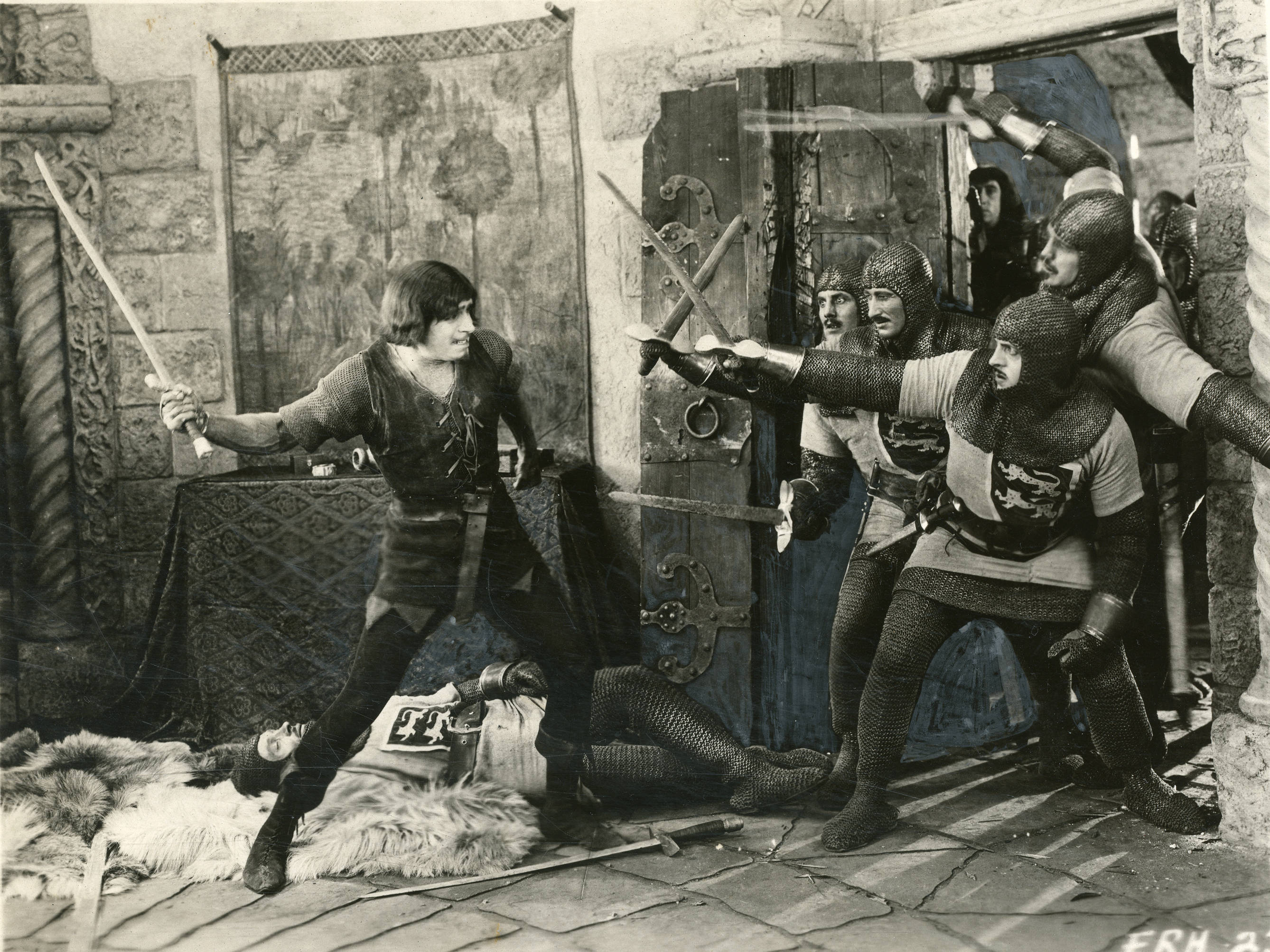
A still from the historical adventure film Robin Hood (1922) starring Douglas Fairbanks

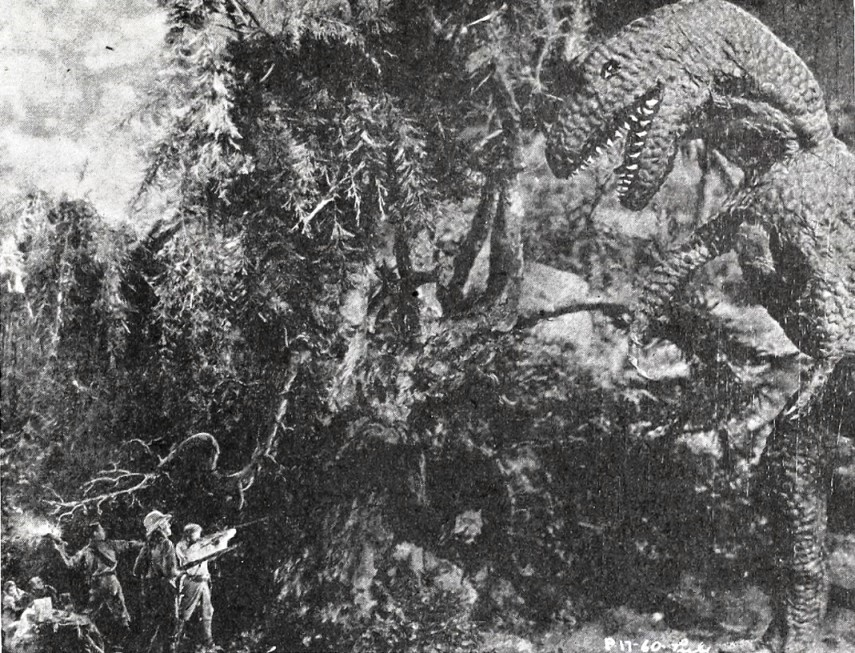
A still from the effects-driven adventure film The Lost World (1925)

The adventure film is a broad genre of film. Some early genre studies found it no different from the Western film or argued that adventure could encompass all Hollywood genres. Commonality was found among historians Brian Taves and Ian Cameron in that the genre required a setting that was both remote in time and space to the film audience and that it contained a positive hero who tries to make right in their world. Some critics such as Taves limit the genre to naturalistic settings, while Yvonne Tasker found that would limit films such as Raiders of the Lost Ark (1981) from the genre. Tasker found that most films in the genre featured narratives located within a fantasy world of exoticized setting, which are often driven by quests for characters seeking mythical objects or treasure hunting. The genre is closely associated with the action film, and is sometimes used interchangeably or in tandem with that genre.

The setting and visuals are key elements of adventure films. This ranged from early technical showcases such as The Lost World (1925) and King Kong (1933). These films set up exotic locations as both beautiful and dangerous. This would be a continuing trend for Hollywood adventure films. The other major Hollywood style was the historical adventure typified by early films in the style of The Black Pirate (1926) and The Mark of Zorro (1920) which feature less intense violence. Historical adventure was a popular Hollywood staple until the mid-1950s. While the historical adventure film would be parodied or presented as highly camp, special effects-driven adventure films began to dominate the market towards the late 1970s, with films such as Star Wars (1977) and Raiders of the Lost Ark (1981). This trend continued into the 21st century.

== Characteristics ==
Adventure is a broad film genre. Early writing on the genre had wide categorizations. Critic André Bazin went as far to say in the 1950s that "there is not difference between Hopalong Cassidy and Tarzan except for their costumes and the arena in which they demonstrate their prowess." Ian Cameron in Adventure in the Movies (1973) stated that adventure "is not confined to a particular genre [...] it is a quality which turns up in almost every sort of story film; indeed the most obvious adventures movies, the sword-and-bosom epics, are usually among the least interesting." American historian Brian Taves wrote in 1993 that having such wide-ranging application of the genre would render it meaningless.

Both Taves and Cameron stated that genre required a setting that was both remote in time and space to its audience. While Cameron refuted the idea of a clearly defined adventure genre, he said films described the "positive feeling for adventure" evoked from the scenes of action in the film and the identification with the main character. Taves echoed this, exemplifying the character of Robin Hood who deals with a valiant fight for just government in an exotic past.

Taves wrote in The Romance of Adventure: The Genre of Historical Adventure Movies (1993) that defining the genre in context with the historical adventure, and said explicitly excluding films with fantasy settings such as Raiders of the Lost Ark (1981) as they involved the supernatural over human agency. Taves wrote that "unlike adventure, fantasy presents a netherworld where events violate physical reality and the bounds of human possibility." Comparatively, in his overview of British adventure cinema, James Chapman said the adventure film was defined from a fictional narrative and excluded films based on historical events and people such as Zulu (1964) and Lawrence of Arabia (1962), finding they belonged to other types of narratives such as the historical film and the war film. Chapman summarized the complicated nature of the genre, stating that the "Adventure film is a less clearly defined than most: indeed, this might be one reason why film historians have left it pretty much alone." He described the style as not being a discrete genre in its own, but a flexible, overarching category that encompasses a range of different related narrative forms.

British author and academic Yvonne Tasker wrote in her 2015 book The Hollywood Action and Adventure Film (2015) that adventure films imply a story that is located within a fantasy of exoticized setting. She found that these films often apply a quest narrative, where characters seek mythical objects or fabulous treasure as seen in films like King Solomon's Mines (1950) or Raiders of the Lost Ark (1981). Tasker opted for a broader sense of genre, and commented on Taves limits, stating it was an understandable impulse to place generic limits on potentially diverse bodies of texts, while included films like Raiders of the Lost Ark which she described as feeling "like an adventure in the broadest sense of the term." Tasker noted this specifically, that even when disregarding its historical setting, the film concerned a quest, with travel and developing moral sense of the hero's place in the world.

Tasker wrote that these films have no consistent iconography, their set design and special effects, ranging from stop-motion, to digital imagery and 3D are given a privileged place in these genres. Chapman also noted the style as being commonly applied to narratives where action and visual spectacle were foregrounded. He included styles like the swashbuckler, the British empire film, the sensationalized spy thriller, and mythological fantasy films as part of adventure cinema genre.

Writing about the adventure genre in the 1970s, Jeffrey Richards said that "since the way a swashbuckler moves and looks is just as important as what it says, we must look at the art director, costume designer, fencing master, stunt arranger, cinematographer and actor just much as the writer and director. For the swashbuckler is truly the sum of all their work."

Both action and adventure are often used together as film genres, and are even used interchangeably. For Taves, he compared the styles saying that adventure films were "something beyond action" and were elevated "beyond the physical challenge" and by "its moral and intellectual flavour."

== History ==
Forms of filmmaking that would become film genres were mostly defined in other media before Thomas Edison devised the Kinetograph in the late 1890s. Genres, such as adventure fiction were developed as written fiction. In the early Hollywood cinema, early adventure cinema were both original stories as well as adaptations of popular media such as adventure stories, magazines, and folk tales. Films were adapted from adventure stories such as King Solomon's Mines (1885), She (1887), and Treasure Island (1883).

Tasker described both action and adventure cinema are resistant to any historical evolutionary chronology. Both genres are self-reflexive and draw from conventions of other genres ranging from horror to historical imperial adventure. Taves found that films that were swashbucklers or pirate-themed adventures were often humorous, and that they retained viability even when parodied.

Many silent films with action and adventure scenarios flourished in the silent films of the 1910s and 1920s. These films required elaborate visual effects that were important to displaying menacing or fantastic worlds. These films often took narratives from novels, such as films like 20,000 Leagues Under the Sea (1916) and The Lost World (1925). Beyond being adaptations of famous books, Tasker said that the appeal of these films was also in their effects laden scene, finding The Lost World a "landmark of effects-led adventure cinema." Outside technical effects, adventure films of Douglas Fairbanks such as Robin Hood (1922) with its scenes of battles and recreations of castles cost a record-setting $1.5 million to produce also provided a variant of adventure spectacle to audiences.

Tasker stated that The Lost World (1925) arguably initiated a jungle adventure film cycle that would be expanded on in the similarly effects driven sound film King Kong (1933). In her study of King Kong, Cynthia Erb noted a conventions of both travel documentary and jungle adventure traditions. Tasker wrote that the best known displays of these films were those that focused on the character of Tarzan which found more significantly commercial success with the success of Metro-Goldwyn-Mayer films featuring Johnny Weissmuller during the decade. Erb found that the jungle imagery of these films of the 1930s frequently showcased the jungle world as frequently alternating between "demonic and edenic" images, while Tasker said the jungle films and other adventure films of the period would establish a travelogue allure of these settings as romantic spaces.

Within the Classical Hollywood cinema, one of the major other styles was the historical adventure film. These films were typically set in the past and drew from the Fairbanks films such as The Black Pirate (1926) and The Mark of Zorro (1920). They feature violence in a less intense manner than other contemporary genres such as the Western or war film. While not specifically associated with one Hollywood studio, Warner Bros. released a series of popular historical adventures featuring Errol Flynn such as Captain Blood (1935), The Charge of the Light Brigade (1936) and The Adventures of Robin Hood (1938). The historical adventure film continued to be a popular Hollywood genre into the mid-1950s featuring various male stars such as Tyrone Power, Douglas Fairbanks Jr., Burt Lancaster, and Stewart Granger.

Imperialism-themed adventure films continued in the 1950s with a greater emphasis on location shooting. Examples include the box office hit King Solomon's Mines (1950) which was shot in Africa. 1960s fantasy films such as Jason and the Argonauts (1963) combined the set-pieces and fantastic locations of historical adventures with renewed emphasis on special effects. By the 1970s, The Three Musketeers (1973) marked a point where the historical adventure has been firmly associated with what Tasker described as "comic - even camp – tone" that would inform later films such as Raiders of the Lost Ark (1981), The Mummy (1999), and Pirates of the Caribbean: The Curse of the Black Pearl (2003). Few other films embarked on more serious tones, such as Ridley Scott's Gladiator and Kingdom of Heaven (2005).

Since the late 1970s, both action and adventure films have become synonymous with the high-budgeted and profitable Hollywood films and franchises. While both genres took on challenging material, towards the late 1970s of an adventure style geared towards more family-oriented audiences with films like Star Wars (1977) and Raiders of the Lost Ark (1981). Star Wars exemplifies a resurgent adventure strand of the 1970s cinema with characters like the Jedi Knights who swing from ropes and wield light sabers recall sword-fighting and swashbuckling films. Tasker commented that this led to a commercially lucrative and culturally conservative version of the genre that would continue into the 21st century with film series like The Lord of the Rings, Harry Potter, and Pirates of the Caribbean. In their analysis of the genre in 2018, Johan Höglund and Agnieszka Soltysik Monnet found that the contemporary adventure form often appears in trans-genre work where the adventure component is perceived as secondary. They exemplified that in films such ranging from Top Gun (1986), Godzilla (2014), to Lone Survivor (2013), which range from fantasy film to science fiction film to war film genres, all adhere to traditional adventure narratives.

== Critical reception ==
Adventure films are generally perceived with a low critical status, with a few exceptions. Historically, the genre has not been seen as authored cinema. The genre's cinematic traditions were effectively absent from debates on genre cinema since the 1960s.

Chapman echoed this statement. He argued that with only a handful of exceptions, adventure films have not won much favour with film critics: "In traditional film criticism there are few 'good' adventure films; those that have won critical acclaim have usually done so on grounds other than their status as genre films." When action and adventure cinema secure awards, it is often in categories such as visual effects and sound editing. Tasker found this reflected Richards comments on the creative labor as being the primary appeal on work in the genre.

== See also ==
- Adventure game
- Travel documentary
