= Anju Makhija =

Indian poet, playwright, and translator

Anju Makhija is an Indian poet, playwright, translator and columnist. She has won several national and international awards for her work in English.

== Biography ==
Anju Makhija was born in Pune and spent several years in Canada. She has a master's degree in media from Concordia University, Montreal. She has worked in the fields of education, training and television. She writes poetry, plays and has worked on audio-visual scripts. Her multimedia production All Together, won her a special award at the National Education Film Festival, California. She has participated and won prizes in poetry and playwriting competitions organized by The British Council, The Poetry Society of India and the BBC. Makhija has published 4 poetry collections incl.'View from the Web' and 'Changing Unchanging: New and selected poems'. She's also the co-editor of 'We Speak in Changing Languages: An Anthology of Indian Women Poets' (1990-2007) Sahitya Akademi. Her poems appeared in the poetry anthology, Anthology of Contemporary Indian Poetry, The Dance of the Peacock: An Anthology of English Poetry from India, featuring 151 Indian English poets, edited by Vivekanand Jha and published by Hidden Brook Press, Canada.

Anju's other main books incl.: 'Seeking the Beloved'(Katha), a co-translation of the 16th century, Sufi poet, Shah Abdul Latif; 'Pickling Season' and 'Mumbai Traps;'. She has also co-edited 4 anthologies related to partition, women, children and Indian English drama.

She has written many plays including: If Wishes Were Horses, The Last Train (Shortlisted for the BBC World Playwrighting Award '09), Meeting with Lord Yama, Unspoken Dialogues (with Aleque Padamsee) and Total Slammer Masala ( with Michael Laub).

Makhija was on the English Advisory Board of the Sahitya Akademi for 5 years. She is based in Mumbai and co-organizes 'Culture Beat' for the Press Club and writes a column for Confluence Magazine, London. She was recently on the jury of the youth poetry competition organized by the Mumbai Literary Festival.

== Awards ==
Anju Makhija won All India Poetry Prize in 1994 for her poem A Farmer’s Ghost. She also won the commendation prize in the Fourth National Poetry Competition 1993 for her poem ‘’Can You Answer, Professor?’’. Makhija has won several awards including: The All India Poetry Competition ('94); the BBC World Regional Poetry Prize ('02); the Sahitya Akademi English Translation Prize ('11). She is the recipient of the Charles Wallace Trust Award and has been invited to festivals and seminars at Cambridge (UK), Montreal ( Canada) Delhi, Jaipur and other venues.

== Bibliography ==
Books of Poetry

- We Speak in Changing Languages: Indian Women Poets 1990–2007 ed. anthology, New Delhi: Sahitya Akademi India 2009
- Seeking the Beloved by Shah Abdul Latif (Translated by Makhija), Katha Publishers New Delhi 2005 ISBN 978-8189020545
- View From the Web – Poems 2005 New Delhi : Har-Anand Books India 2005 ISBN 978-8124102558

Poetry Anthologies

- Anthology of Contemporary Indian Poetry (2004) ed. by Menka Shivdasani and published by Michael Rothenberg, Big Bridge United States.
- The Dance of the Peacock: An Anthology of English Poetry from India (2013) ed. by Vivekanand Jha and published by Hidden Brook Press, Canada.

== See also ==
- Indian English Literature
- Indian Writing in English
- Indian poetry
- The Poetry Society (India)
