= K. Srilata =

Indian poet, fiction writer, translator and academic

Srilata K
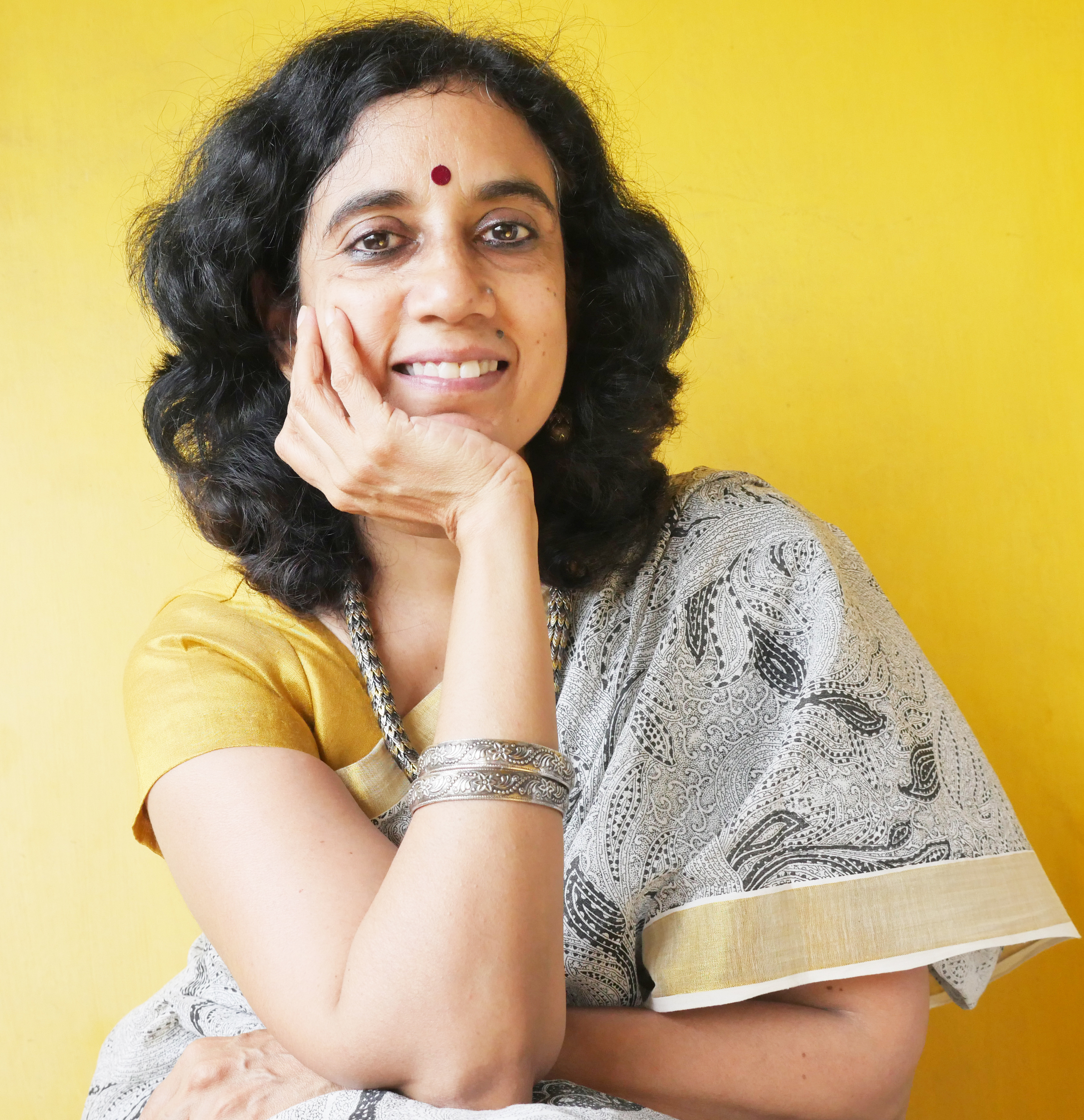
- Srilata in 2016
- Born: Ranchi
- Occupations: Academic, poet, author
- Website: https://srilatak.com/

K. Srilata (also known as Srilata Krishnan) is an Indian poet, fiction writer, translator and academic based in Chennai. Srilata has authored seven volumes of poetry, five books of translation from Tamil to English, a novel and a non-fiction book. Her works include the poetry collections Footnotes to the Mahabharata (Westland/Context), Three Women in a Single-Room House (Sahitya Akademi) and The Unmistakable Presence of Absent Humans (2019) (Poetrywala), the non-fiction book This Kind of Child: The ‘Disability’ Story (Westland), as well as the novel Table for Four (Penguin).

Srilata's most recent collection of poems, Footnotes to the Mahabharata, is made up of five poetic sequences which explore the interior lives of Alli, Hidimbi, Draupadi, Gandhari and Kunti and is shaped around what remains unexamined or invisible within extant interpretations of the epic. The poems use as their starting point, off-centre interpretations, revised and altered tales. Footnotes to the Mahabharata opens with a sequence based on Alli, a character exclusive to the Tamil, Dravidian tradition, not on the map of the mainstream Mahabharata. The book inspired a performative reading by Madras Players, a theatre group based in Chennai.

Srilata's debut novel Table for Four was long-listed in 2009 for the Man Asian Literary Prize and published in 2011. The novel tells the story of Maya, Sandra and Derek, graduate students at UC Santa Cruz who have been house-mates for three-year as they prepare to sit down at the tortoise listening table for dinner with Uncle Prithvi, the house-owner. The novel is a rumination of the burden of secrets and the pain of remembering and accepting the betrayals, loss, and tragedies of our lives.

In This Kind of Child: The `Disability’ Story, Srilata brings together first-person accounts, interviews and short fiction which open up for us the experiential worlds of persons with disabilities and those who love them. The book offers a multi-perspectival understanding of the disability experience—its emotional as well as imagined truth, both to the disabled themselves as well as to those closely associated with them.

The poems in Srilata's collection Three Women in a Single-Room House, published by Sahitya Akademi in 2023, trace the bitter-sweet shape of family and female lineage. The poems in The Unmistakable Presence of Absent Humans play with the idea of absent presences, grief, loss and endurance.

Srilata's first book of poems, Seablue Child, was published in 2000, followed by Arriving Shortly (2011). Other poetry collections include Writing Octopus and Bookmarking the Oasis (2015). Srilata also co-edited and co-translated from Tamil to English two millennia worth of poetry titled Rapids of a Great River: The Penguin Book of Tamil Poetry - along with Lakshmi Holmstrom and Subashree Krishnaswamy. Along with Subashree Krishnaswamy, she edited Short Fiction from South India (OUP), a reader for undergraduate students. Yoda Press published an Indo-Irish collaborative poetry anthology All the Worlds Between that Srilata co-edited with Fiona Bolger. Srilata is also co-editor (along with Swarnalatha Rangarajan) of Lifescapes: Interviews with Contemporary Women Writers from Tamil Nadu (Women Unlimited).

Srilata's published translations include the Tamil writer R. Vatsala's novels Once there was a girl (Vattathul), The Scent of Happiness (Kannukkul Satru Payanithu), a co-translation along with Shobhana Kumar of the Tamil poet Salma's work i, Salma (Red River), and a translation of women's writing from the Self-Respect Movement The Other Half of the Coconut: Women Writing Self-Respect History.

Srilata's poems have been widely anthologized and featured in collections such as The Bloodaxe Book of Contemporary Indian Poets, The Penguin Book of Indian Poets, The Harper Collins Book of English Poetry, A Poem a Day, Yearbook of Indian Poetry in English and The Penguin Book of Poems on the Indian City.

Srilata was awarded the Fulbright fellowship, the Charles Wallace fellowship and a foundation project by the India Foundation for the Arts to support the research for her book of poems Footnotes to the Mahabharata. She has been writer in residence at the University of Sterling, Scotland courtesy the Charles Wallace writing grant, at the Yeonhui Art Space, Seoul and at Sangam House, India. As part of a Feminist Poets’ Summit project, Srilata was commissioned by the Goethe-Institut Chennai in cooperation with the Chennai Photo Biennale to write poetry. Her poems have been translated into Tamil, Hindi and Korean.

Srilata has been a participant speaker at several literary festivals including the Jaipur Literary Festival, the Hindu Lit for Life, the Seoul International Writers Festival, the Sahitya Akademi's International Literature Festival, the Kala Ghoda Arts Festival, the Bangalore Literary Festival, the Bengaluru Poetry Festival and the Hyderabad Literary Festival, among others.

Srilata's poem, In Santa Cruz, Diagnosed Home Sick, won the First Prize in the All India Poetry Competition (organized by the British Council and The Poetry Society (India)) in 1998. She has also been awarded the Unisun British Council Poetry Award (2007).

Srilata has a masters and a PhD in Literature from the University of Hyderabad. Formerly a Professor of Literature at the Indian Institute of Technology (IIT) Madras, she has taught courses and workshops in Creative Writing at various institutes and universities including at the Chennai Mathematical Institute and Ahmedabad University. She is currently Distinguished Visiting Professor at Shiv Nadar University, Chennai and adjunct Professor at the Chennai Mathematical Institute.

== Bibliography ==
=== Poetry Collections ===
- Footnotes to the Mahabharata. Chennai: Context, 2025, ISBN 9789360450045
- Three Women in a Single-Room House. New Delhi: Sahitya Akademi, 2023, ISBN 978-9355486264
- The Unmistakable Presence of Absent Humans. Mumbai: Paperwall/Poetrywala, 2019, ISBN 978-9382749943
- All the Worlds Between: A Collaborative Poetry Project Between India and Ireland. (Co-edited with Fiona Bolger). New Delhi: Yoda, 2017, ISBN 9789382579472
- Bookmarking the Oasis. Mumbai: Paperwall/Poetrywala, 2015, ISBN 9789382749295
- Writing Octopus. New Delhi: Authorspress, 2013, ISBN 978-81-7273-785-6
- Arriving Shortly. Kolkata: Writers Workshop, 2011, ISBN 978-93-5045-015-4
- Seablue Child. Kolkata: The Brown Critique, 2002

=== Fiction ===
- Table for Four. New Delhi: Penguin, 2011, ISBN 978-0-14-306819-8

=== Non-Fiction ===
- This Kind of Child: The `Disability’ Story. New Delhi: Westland, 2022, ISBN 978-9395767521
- Short Fiction from South India (co-edited with Subashree Krishnaswamy). New Delhi: OUP, 2008, ISBN 978-0195692464
- Lifescapes: Interviews with Contemporary Women Writers from Tamilnadu (co-edited with Swarnalatha Rangarajan). New Delhi: Women Unlimited, 2019, ISBN 978-9385606199

=== Translations ===
- The Rapids of a Great River: The Penguin Book of Tamil Poetry Penguin Book of Tamil Poetry (co-edited with Lakshmi Holmstrom and Subashree Krishnaswamy). New Delhi: Penguin India, 2009, ISBN 9780670082810
- Once There Was a Girl (translation of the Tamil novel Vattathul by R.Vatsala). Kolkata: Writers Workshop, 2012, ISBN 978-93-5045-027-7
- The Scent of Happiness (co-translation with Kaamya Sharma of Kannukkul Satru Payanithu, a Tamil novel by R Vatsala). New Delhi: Ratna Sagar, 2021, ISBN 978-8194756095
- Salma: Selected Poems (co-translation with Shobhana Kumar of the Tamil poet Salma's work). New Delhi: Red River, 2023, ISBN 978-9392494710

=== Academic/Editing ===
- The Other Half of the Coconut: Women Writing Self-Respect History. New Delhi: Zubaan, 2003, ISBN 978-81-86706-50-3
- Short Fiction from South India, (co-edited with Subashree Krishnaswamy). New Delhi: OUP, 2008, ISBN 978-0-19-569246-4
- Lifescapes: Interviews with Contemporary Women Writers from Tamilnadu (co-edited with Swarnalatha Rangarajan). New Delhi: Women Unlimited, 2019, ISBN 978-9385606199

=== Featured in ===
- The Bloodaxe Book of Contemporary Indian Poets. Northumberland: BloodAxe, 2008, ISBN 9781852248017
- The Harper Collins Book of English Poetry. New Delhi: Harper Collins, 2012, ISBN 978-9350290415
- A Poem a Day (edited by Gulzar). New Delhi: Harper Collins, 2020, ISBN 978-9353575908
- The Penguin Book of Indian Poets. New Delhi: Penguin, 2022, ISBN 9780670096862
- The Dance of the Peacock: An Anthology of English Poetry from India (ed. Dr Vivekanand Jha). Canada: Hidden Brook Press, 2013, ISBN 978-1927725009
- "For [Jeanne Mukuninwa]", "What father left us", and "Gomati",The Harper Collins Book of English Poetry (ed. Sudeep Sen). India, 2013, ISBN 978-93-5029-517-5
- Another Country: An Anthology of Post-Independence Poetry in English, (ed. Arundhathi Subramaniam). New Delhi: Sahitya Akademi, 2013, ISBN 978-81-260-4067-4
- "England, 1999", "A Somewhat Different Question", and "I Wear Wordlessness like a Tattered Dress", Caravan, February 2013
- "Poem Walk", Kavya Bharati, 2011, No. 23
- "Drunken, Gasping Fish-lungs", "Mining", and "Slow Trot", Muse India, Issue 63
- "A Brief History of Writing", and "Gravity", Prairie Schooner 87, no. 2, 2013
- "Mazhai/Rain", Sonic Boom, Issue 3, 2014

=== Stories ===
- "You Expert Woman, You", Guftugu, May 2017
- "Mynah Hands, Flying Fingers", The Punch Magazine, April 2017
- "Rainbow Loom Bracelet", Out of Print, September 2015
- "Cousin, Newly Acquired", Madras Mag, October 2014
- "These Things Happen if You Don't Watch it", Volume 28, Issue 3, Wasafiri, 2013
- "Game of Asylum Seekers", Breaking the Bow: Speculative Fiction Inspired by the Ramayana (edited by Anil Menon and Vandana Singh), Zubaan, 2012, ISBN 978-93-81017-04-3
- "Sarasu", the Little Magazine, Vol. 5, Issue 4, 2004; First Impressions: Stories and Plays Shortlisted for the TLM New Writing Award, 2006 (the Little Magazine, New Delhi, 2006), Other People: The Sangam House Reader Vol. I, Sangam House 2011
- "State of Whiteness", The Shrinking Woman and Other Stories, Bangalore: Unisun, 2009, ISBN 9788188234530
- "How Do I Love Thee?: Let Me Count the Ways", The Penguin Book of New Writing From India 2: First Proofs, New Delhi: Penguin, 2006

== Sources ==
- Eighth National Poetry Competition 1998 – Award Winners
- K Srilata – An Interview
- Selected Poetry of K Srilata
- India Writes – Contemporary Indian Poetry
- Poems by K Srilata on Recours au Poeme
- "Terra Nullius" on Recours au Poeme
- "Dreaming Mostly of Nameless Things" on Origami Poems
- "Dreaming, Mostly of Nameless Things" on YouTube
- "Somewhere a Skylight" on Origami Poems
- "Not in the Picture" and "A Big Elephant in My Room"
- K Srilata – Poetry at Sangam House
- "Boxes have that Effect" at Right Hand Pointing
- K Srilata – Poetry International Web
- Taut and Crisp on The Hindu Verse Reviews
- Penning Verse on The Hindu
- K Srilata – Poemhunter.com
- "A Disappeared Person", "Boundaries", "Behind me, a Slow, Full Moon" and "Slender" on Brown Critique
