= Kavery Nambisan =

Indian surgeon and novelist

- Born: Palangala, Kodagu district, India
- Citizenship: Indian
- Education: St. John's Medical College, Bangalore
- Occupation: Surgeon
- Spouse: Vijay Nambisan
- Writing career
- Pen name: Kavery Bhatt
- Language: English, Kodava
- Notable work: The Story that Must Not Be Told

Kavery Nambisan is an Indian surgeon and novelist. Her career in medicine has been a strong influence in her fiction.

== Life ==
Kavery Nambisan was born in Palangala village in south Kodagu, India, in a politician's family. Her father, C.M. Poonacha, was at one time a Union Railway Minister. She spent her early years in Madikeri. She studied medicine in St. John's Medical College, Bangalore from 1965 and then studied surgery at the University of Liverpool, England, where she obtained the FRCS qualification. She worked as a surgeon in various parts of rural India before moving to Lonavala to start a free medical centre for migrant labourers.

Nambisan works as a surgeon and medical advisor at the Tata Coffee Hospital in Kodagu, Karnataka, and is the Chief Medical Officer for Tata Coffee. She has created several programmes for child immunisation and family planning for the rural communities. She is vocal in her critiques of urban centred health planning.

Nambisan was married to Vijay Nambisan, a journalist and poet. She has a daughter, Chetana, from an earlier marriage to Dr K.R. Bhatt, which lasted eighteen years.

== Literary career ==
Kavery Nambisan began by writing under her first married name Kavery Bhatt for children's magazines. She wrote stories for the now defunct children's magazine Target. She also contributed to Femina and Eve's Weekly.

Nambisan has authored several novels for adults, each with widely differing themes. Her first book, published under the name Kavery Bhatt, The Truth (almost) About Bharat, is the story of a rebellious young medical student who runs away from medical college, and begins a cross-country road trip on his motorcycle. The book went out of print and was recently re-released. Her second novel, The Scent of Pepper (1996) was set in her birthplace, Kodagu and is a portrait of the life and culture of its people, through the eyes of a family from colonial rule to independence. Mango-coloured Fish (1998) concerns a woman whose marriage has been arranged to a man she does not love. On Wings of Butterflies (2002) is set in the women's movement in independent India and narrates the story of a group of women entering politics. The Hills of Angheri (2005) draws from Nambisan's own experiences as a doctor, tracing a young woman's medical career. Her sixth novel, The Story that Must Not Be Told was shortlisted for the DSC Prize for South Asian Literature in 2012, as well as the Man Asian Literary Prize in 2008. Her seventh and most recent novel, A Town Like Ours (2014) is an account of the lives of several people, narrated by a sex worker living in a small town, and engages with themes of identity and industrialisation.

Nambisan's story Dr Sad and the Power Lunch was joint runner-up in the third Outlook-Picador non-fiction contest in 2003. She has also contributed fiction to Indian Literature, the journal published by the Sahitya Akademi (India's National Academy of Letters).

A Luxury Called Health: A Doctor’s Journey Through the Art, the Science and the Trickery of Medicine, her first non-fiction book is based on her experiences as a doctor and honestly discusses the ills of the profession.

She has also contributed some works of criticism, including a piece on 'New Issues in Fiction' to the journal Indian Literature.

== Awards and recognition ==
Literary Awards and Recognition:

Kavery Nambisan was a Coorg Person of the Year in 2005.

== Publications ==
- Once Upon a Forest, Children's Book Trust, India, 1986. (As Kavery Bhatt.)
- Kitty Kite, Children's Book Trust, India, 1987. (As Kavery Bhatt.)
- The Truth (almost) About Bharat, Penguin India, 1991. (As Kavery Bhatt.)
- The Scent of Pepper, Penguin India, 1996.
- Mango-coloured fish, Penguin India, 1998.
- On Wings of Butterflies, Penguin India, 2002.
- The Hills of Angheri, Penguin, 2005.
- The Story that Must Not Be Told, Penguin, 2010.
- A Town Like Ours, Aleph Book Company, 2014.
- A Luxury Called Health, Speaking Tiger, 2021.
