= Rajlukshmee Debee Bhattacharya =

Indian poet, translator and literary critic (1927–2005)

Rajlukshmee Debee Bhattacharya (Bengali: রাজলক্ষ্মী দেবী ভট্টাচার্য; also transliterated Rajlakshmi Devi, Rajiluxmi Debi; published under the name Rajlukshmee Debee; 8 May 1927 — 19 February 2005) was an Indian poet, translator and literary critic writing in Bengali and English. She won First Prize at the All India Poetry Competition in 1991 organized by The Poetry Society (India) in collaboration with the British Council.

== Biography ==
Debee was born in Mymensingh, East Bengal, in 1927. She graduated from Ananda Mohan College with a Bachelor of Arts with Honours in philosophy. After moving to Kolkata following the Partition of Bengal (1947), she earned a Master of Arts in philosophy from the University of Calcutta and a PhD from Pune University. She taught at the Indian Institute of Technology, Kharagpur and Fergusson College, Pune. She was also a Professor of Philosophy at Nowrosjee Wadia College.

She published many poems and books of poetry in Bengali, and then in 1972, published a volume of her poetry translated into English, The Owl and Other Poems. She later published The Touch Me Not Girl in 2000. Her translation works are unique works of transcreation, and her translations include the songs of Rabindranath Tagore.

Rajlukshmee Debee was All India Poetry Prize winner in 1991 for her poem Punarnava (‘’The Ever Renewing’’). Rajlukshmee was also on the jury for the first ever All India Poetry Competition for School Children held in 1996.

She died on 19 May, 2005, at the age of 77.

== Selected works ==
Books

- The Owl and Other Poems, Writers Workshop, Kolkata India 1972
- The Touch Me Not Girl, Disha Publishers, New Delhi India 2000.
- 28 Songs of Rabindranath Tagore, Writers Workshop, Kolkata India 2002.

Articles

- 'Personal Man and Personal God', International Philosophical Quarterly Volume-15, December 1975.
- 'Because He is a Man', Cambridge Journal Volume 49, Issue 175, January 1974.
- 'The Waste Land of Bengali Fiction', Indian Writing Today, Volume-3, Number-3, July–September 1969

== See also ==
- Indian English Literature
- Indian Writing in English
- Indian poetry
- The Poetry Society (India)
