= Rukmini Bhaya Nair =

Indian writer

- Education: University of Cambridge
- Scientific career
- Fields: Linguistics; Cognition; Literary Theory
- Workplaces: Indian Institute of Technology Delhi (present); Jawaharlal Nehru University; National University of Singapore; University of Washington at Seattle
- Website: sites.google.com/site/rukminibhayanairshomepage/

Rukmini Bhaya Nair is a linguist, poet, writer and critic of India. She won the First Prize for her poem kali in the "All India Poetry Competition" in 1990 organised by The Poetry Society (India) in collaboration with British Council. She is currently a professor at Humanities and Social Sciences department of the Indian Institute of Technology Delhi (IIT Delhi). Nair is known for being a critic of the Hindutva ideology and religious and caste discrimination in India.

== Biography ==
Rukmini Bhaya Nair is Professor of Linguistics and English at Humanities and Social Sciences department of IIT, Delhi. She received her Ph.D. from the University of Cambridge in 1982 and is internationally recognised for her work in the areas of linguistics, cognition and literary theory. In 2006, Nair received a second honoris causa doctoral degree from the University of Antwerp, Belgium.

Nair was Visiting Professor at the Department of English, Stanford University, in 2005–2006 and has also taught at the Jawaharlal Nehru University, the National University of Singapore and the University of Washington at Seattle. She has delivered plenary addresses and invited lectures at the Indian Institute of Advanced Study, Shimla and at many foreign universities. These include Aarhus, Berkeley, Birmingham, Brussels, Cape Town, Colombo, Copenhagen, East Anglia, Emory, Hangzhou, Kuala Lumpur, Linkoping, Los Angeles, Portsmouth, the Max Planck Institute, Nijmegen, the Federal & Catholic Univs. of Rio de Janeiro, Brazil, Saarbrücken, Sorbonne, SOAS, London, Toronto, Trieste and Xinxiang,

Academic books by Nair include Technobrat: Culture in a Cybernetic Classroom (HarperCollins, 1997); Narrative Gravity: Conversation, Cognition, Culture (Oxford University Press and Routledge, London and New York, 2003); Lying on the Postcolonial Couch: the Idea of Indifference (Minnesota University Press and Oxford University Press, India, 2002); as well as an edited volume, Translation, Text and Theory: the Paradigm of India (Sage, 2002).

Nair serves on the editorial boards of the International Journal of Literary Semantics (De Gruyter: Berlin & New York), The Journal of Multicultural Discourses (Multilingual Matters: London and Beijing); The Journal of Pragmatics (Elseiver: Amsterdam); Psychology & Social Practice (an e-journal) and The Macmillan Essential Dictionary. As the editor of Biblio, India's leading literary and cultural journal, she is also part of the Australian ABC Radio's panel of experts for its well-known program 'The Book Show'. In addition, she contributes to all major national dailies and magazines and is a frequent panellist on Mark Tully's BBC broadcast 'Something Understood'.

From the time she won, as a student, an Essay Prize in a competition organised by La Stampa, Le Monde, Die Welt and The Times in conjunction with the 'First International Exhibition on Man & his Environment', Turin, Italy, she has also been the recipient of several awards (The J.N. Tata Scholarship, the Hornby and Charles Wallace Awards, the Dorothy Leet Grant etc.). Her latest award was a CRASSH fellowship (Centre for Research in the Arts, Humanities & Social Sciences) on the theme 'Conversation' as a Fellow of Wolfson College at the University of Cambridge in 2006. Nair, who has been called 'the first significant post-modern poet in Indian English' has published three books of poetry: The Hyoid Bone, The Ayodhya Cantos and Yellow Hibiscus (Penguin, 1992, 1999, 2004). In 1990, Nair received the first prize in the All India Poetry Society/ British Council competition. Her work has since appeared in Penguin New Writing in India (1992), in the anthology Mosaic, featuring award-winning writers from the U.K and India (1999), in Reasons for Belonging: Fourteen Contemporary Indian Poets (2002) and special issues of Poetry International (2004) and Fulcrum (2006). It has been translated into German, Swedish and Macedonian. The year 2000 saw Nair selected as a 'Face of the Millennium' in a national survey of writers by India Today.

Nair's writings, both creative and critical, are taught on courses at universities such as Chicago, Toronto Kent, Oxford and Washington, and she contends that she writes poetry for the same reason that she does research in cognitive linguistics – to discover the limits of language. Her great ambition is simply to continue to write and research.

Her awards and fellowships include J.N. Tata Scholarship, the Hornby Foundation Award and the Dorothy Lee Grant besides winning Poetry prizes of Poetry Society ( India ) etc.

== Bibliography ==
=== Books ===
- Keywords for India: A Conceptual Lexicon for the 21st Century. (Co-Editor). Bloomsbury Academic. 2020. ISBN 9781350039278
- Mad Girl's Love Song. (A novel). New Delhi: HarperCollins, India 2013. ISBN 9789350296479
- Poetry in a Time of Terror: Essays in the Postcolonial Preternatural. Oxford University Press, New Delhi and New York 2009.
- Yellow Hibiscus. (New & Selected Poems). New Delhi: Penguin Books, India 2004. ISBN 978-0-14302-883-3
- Narrative Gravity: Conversation, Cognition, Culture.. New Delhi: Oxford University Press, London 2003. ISBN 0-415-30735-X
- Lying on the Postcolonial Couch: the Idea of Indifference. University of Minnesota Press, USA; and Oxford University Press, India; 2002.
- Translation, Text and Theory: the Paradigm of India. Edited: Sage, New Delhi, India; Thousand Oaks, USA; and London, UK; 2002.
- The Ayodhya Cantos. (Poetry in English). New Delhi: Penguin Books, India 1999. ISBN 978-0-67088-840-5
- Technobrat: Culture in a Cybernetic Classroom. New Delhi: HarperCollins, India 1997. ISBN 978-817223-273-3
- The Hyoid Bone. (Poetry in English). New Delhi: Penguin Books, India 1992. ISBN 978-0-670-84029-8

=== Essays ===
- "Are We What We Eat?"

=== Online references ===
- Rukmini Bhaya Nair’s Web Page
- Rukmini Bhaya Nair's IITD Web Page
- About Rukmini Bhaya Nair and her poetry
- A Review of Rukmini Bhaya Nair’s Yellow Hibiscus by Anjum Hasan

== See also ==
- Rukmini Bhaya Nair – A Biography
- Rukmini Bhaya Nair| Professional Profile
- Indian English Literature
- Indian Writing in English
- Indian poetry
- The Poetry Society (India)
