= Anne Marie Macari =

American poet (born 1939)

Anne Marie Macari (born 1955) is an American poet.

== Life and career ==
Macari was born in Queens, New York. She is a graduate of Oberlin College and holds an MFA in creative writing from Sarah Lawrence College. Macari founded and taught in the Drew University MFA Program for Poetry & Poetry in Translation. She has also taught on the faculty of the Prague Summer Seminars. She is president of the Alice James Books Board of Directors.

Macari has published five books of poetry, including Heaven Beneath (Persea, 2020). Her first book, Ivory Cradle, won The APR/Honickman First Book Prize in Poetry. Macari's poems have been published in many literary journals and magazines, including TriQuarterly, Bloomsbury Review, Shenandoah, The American Poetry Review, Five Points (as winner of the James Dickey Prize for Poetry), The Cortland Review, and The Iowa Review. Her work has appeared in anthologies, including From the Fishhouse (Persea Books, 2009) and Never Before: Poems About First Experiences (Four Way Books).

Macari has read her poetry throughout the United States in many venues, including the Dodge Poetry Festival. She has also read her work at festivals in England, Austria, and in Prague. She lives in New York City and Miami Beach, Florida. Her partner was poet Gerald Stern.

== Awards ==
- Ivory Cradle, winner, The APR/Honickman First Book Prize in Poetry

== Published works ==
- Heaven Beneath (Persea) 2020
- Red Deer (Persea) 2015
- She Heads into the Wilderness (Autumn House Press, 2008)
- Gloryland (Alice James Books), 2005
- Ivory Cradle (Copper Canyon Press, 2000)
