= Birds of North Europe =

"Birds of North Europe" is a poem by Tabish Khair, the internationally acclaimed Indian English author and journalist. The poem won First Prize in the Sixth All India Poetry Competition conducted by The Poetry Society (India) in 1995. The poem brought the first major literary award for Tabish Khair, who is better known as a novelist of repute.

== Excerpts from the poem ==
Twenty-four years in different European cities and he had not lost
His surprise at how birds stopped at the threshold
Of their houses. Never

Flying into rooms, to be decapitated by fan-blades or carefully
Herded through open windows to another life, never
Building on this lampshade

*****

Did not intrude into private spheres. demanding to be overlooked
Or worshipped. They did not consider houses simply
Exotic trees or hollowed

Hills. Not being particularly learned, he did not know the thread
Of fear that knots the wild to the willed, not
Being well-read, he

Did not remember the history behind their old and geometrical
Gardens, could not recall a time when the English
Parliament had killed a bill,

Shocked by a jackdaw's flight across the room. He simply marked
The absence of uncaged birds in their homes. He thought
It was strange.

== Comments and criticism ==
The poem has received positive reviews since its first publication in 1995 in the book Emerging Voices and has since been widely anthologised. The poem has been frequently quoted in scholarly analysis of contemporary Indian English poetry.

== See also ==
- The Poetry Society (India)
