= Poet Laureate of New Jersey =

The poet laureate of New Jersey (statutorily known as New Jersey William Carlos Williams Citation of Merit) was an honor presented biennially by the Governor of New Jersey to a distinguished New Jersey poet. Created in 1999, this position existed for less than four years and was abolished by the legislature effective July 2, 2003. When the New Jersey State Legislature created the laureate position, the bill provided specifically for the creation of an award named in honor of twentieth-century poet and physician William Carlos Williams (1883–1963) who resided in Rutherford, New Jersey. However, the legislature recognized that the award's recipient would "be considered the poet laureate of the State of New Jersey for a period of two years." Before the position was abolished, only two poets, Gerald Stern and Amiri Baraka, had been appointed as the state's poet laureate.

The legislature's bill was signed into law by Governor Christine Todd Whitman. It was expected that the award's recipient—the poet laureate—would "engage in activities to promote and encourage poetry within the State and shall give no fewer than two public readings within the State each year." In this respect, New Jersey's poet laureate was similar to the position of Poet laureate in other American states and in several other countries. However, a public reading in September 2002 by the state's second laureate, Newark-based poet Amiri Baraka, of his poem "Somebody Blew Up America" was met with harsh criticism by the public and news media. The poem, which explores the terrorist attacks on September 11, 2001, was criticized by many as violent, incendiary, and antisemitic, and the ensuing controversy ignited a political firestorm. Because of Baraka's defiant refusals to apologize or resign as poet laureate and since there was no mechanism in the law to remove him, the position was abolished by the legislature and Governor James E. McGreevey in 2003.

== Establishing the position (1998–2000) ==
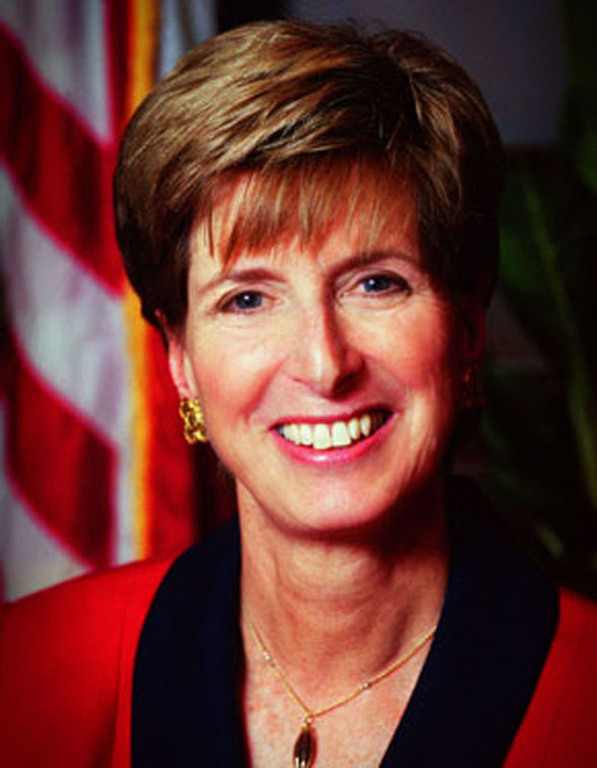
As governor, Christine Todd Whitman signed into law the bill that created the honorary position of state poet laureate in 1999.

On December 10, 1998, Assemblyman Richard H. Bagger and Assemblyman Leonard Lance introduced legislation in the New Jersey General Assembly to establish an award, the New Jersey William Carlos Williams Citation of Merit, "which the Governor will present biennially to a distinguished New Jersey poet." The award was named to honor William Carlos Williams (1883–1963), a National Book Award and Pulitzer Prize-winning poet and physician who practiced medicine in his birthplace of Rutherford, New Jersey. According to the bill, the recipient would receive a $10,000 honorarium and be considered the poet laureate of the State of New Jersey. This legislation, Assembly Bill No. 2714, passed the General Assembly on March 29, 1999, with 72 votes in favor, 2 votes opposed. On June 21, 1999, the New Jersey State Senate voted 39 in favor and none opposed. The bill was signed into law by Governor Christine Todd Whitman on October 4, 1999.

The statute provided that every two years, a panel of four persons from New Jersey "who are either distinguished poets or persons who represent a range of stylistic approaches in the field of poetry" and chosen by "the New Jersey Council for the Humanities, in consultation with the New Jersey State Council on the Arts", would convene to select candidates for the consideration of the state's governor. After the first appointment of a poet laureate, each subsequent nominating panel would include the incumbent poet laureate as a fifth member. The governor alone would appoint the poet laureate by presenting him or her with the New Jersey William Carlos Williams Citation of Merit.

Pursuant to statute, the state's poet laureate would serve for a term of two years in which the person appointed would be required to "engage in activities to promote and encourage poetry within the State and shall give no fewer than two public readings within the State each year."

== First poet laureate (2000–2002) ==
Poet Gerald Stern (1925–2022), from Lawrenceville, New Jersey, was appointed as the state's first poet laureate by Governor Christine Todd Whitman on April 17, 2000. At the time of his appointment, Stern had been the author of twelve books of poetry and won the National Book Award for his 1998 collection This Time: New and Selected Poems. Stern had been a finalist for the Pulitzer Prize for Poetry in 1991 for his collection Leaving Another Kingdom. Poet and Drew University literature professor Ross Gay described Stern's work, saying that his poems "feel to me, often, a bit like that story, or rather, his manner of telling it: here is my pain, here is my sorrow, here is the song I've made of it." Stern's last public reading as poet laureate was held on June 27, 2002 at a Summer Writer's Conference held at Rutgers University's Camden campus.

== Second poet laureate (2002–2003) ==
=== Appointment of Amiri Baraka ===
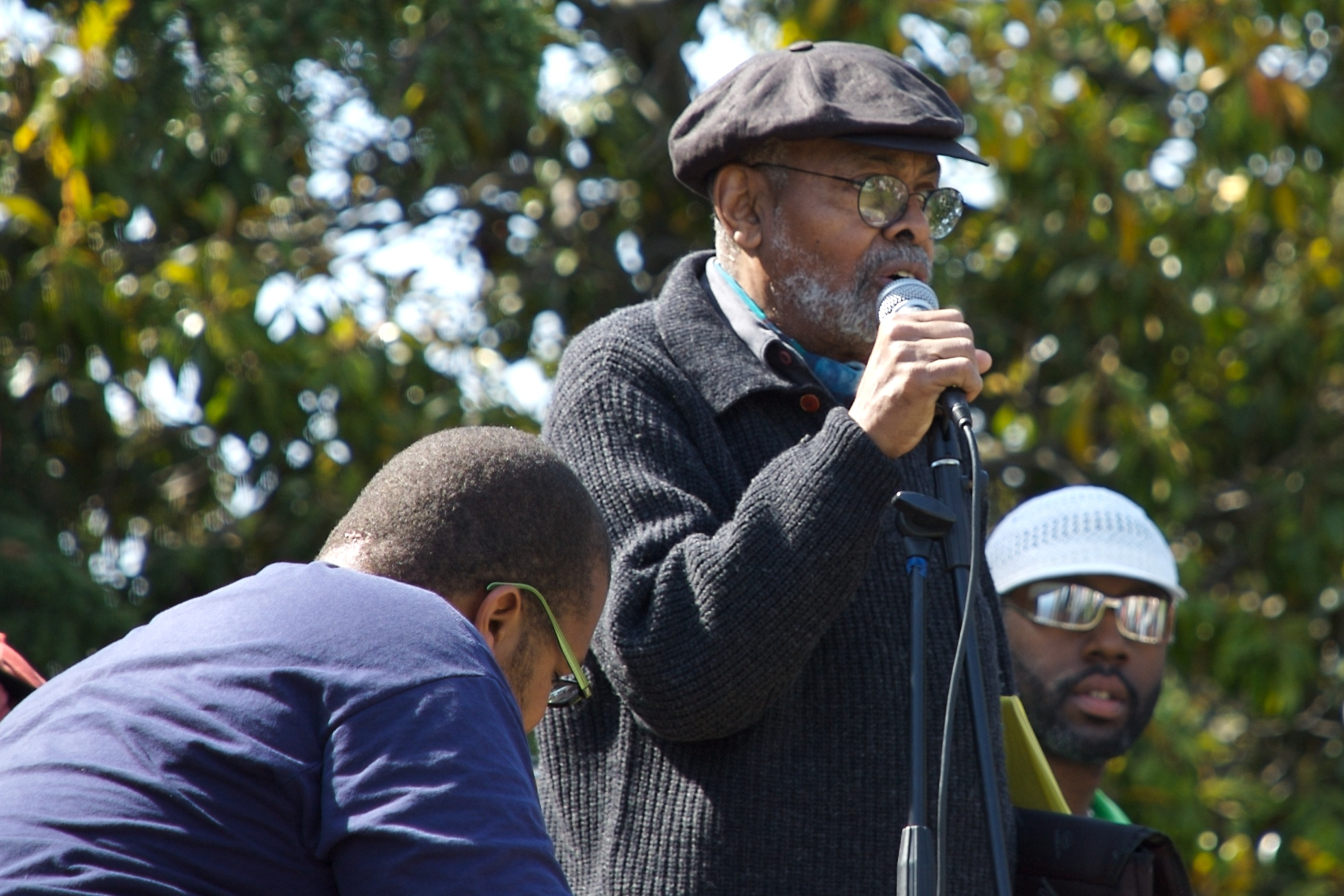
Baraka addressing the Malcolm X Festival and performing with Marcel Diallo and his Electric Church Band

Governor Jim McGreevey had announced the appointment of Newark-born poet Amiri Baraka (1934–2014) as the state's second poet laureate on August 28, 2002 although his selection was expected at least two months earlier. Baraka, born Everett Leroy Jones, was an African-American poet, playwright, and author of fiction, essays and music criticism. Baraka's poetry and writing has attracted both acclaim and condemnation. Within the African-American community, critics compare him to James Baldwin and call Baraka one of the most respected and most widely published Black writers of his generation. Others have said that his work often ventures into expressions of violence, racism, homophobia, and misogyny—particularly his advocacy of rape, hate, and violence towards women, homosexuals, Caucasians, and Jews.

The previous poet laureate, Gerald Stern, said that he advocated for Baraka's selection because he "thought it was important for the black community to get recognition." Slate.com political reporter David Weigel said that McGreevey's selection of Baraka "was a no-brainer—he was a sort of icon, and a major figure within a constituency McGreevey counted on". At a ceremony in August 2002, Baraka warned McGreevey that the decision to appoint him as poet laureate might be a mistake because of his controversial views, saying "You're gonna catch hell for this". After Baraka's death in January 2014, McGreevey said, "I named him poet laureate because I appreciated his art, his intelligence and his creative energy. I've always had great personal affect(ion) for him and recognized him as a gifted creative force."

=== Controversy over "Somebody Blew Up America" ===
On September 20, 2002, Baraka incited a public controversy with a public reading of his poem "Somebody Blew Up America" in front of 2,000 people at the September 2002 Geraldine R. Dodge Poetry Festival held in Stanhope, New Jersey. He was briefly booed by the audience. This poem, written in October 2001, was read at the festival—held one year after the September 11 attacks on the World Trade Center—and was later published in his 2003 collection Somebody Blew Up America and Other Poems. This poem, and the collection in which it was included, is described by one critic as "one more mark in modern Black radical and revolutionary cultural reconstruction." Princeton University poetry professor Craig Dworkin, said that he did not like the poem, but added "I do like the sense that a poet can be disturbing and not necessarily comforting or consensus-building." Immediately after its public reading, the poem met with harsh criticism by literary critics, politicians, and the public. The poem is highly critical of racism in America, and includes angry depictions of public figures such as Rudolph Giuliani, Trent Lott, Clarence Thomas, Condoleezza Rice, Colin Powell and Ward Connerly. It was also considered antisemitic because of lines claiming Israel's involvement in the World Trade Center attacks, and supporting the theory that the United States government knew about the 9/11 attacks in advance.

Who knew the World Trade Center was gonna get bombed
Who told 4,000 Israeli workers at the Twin Towers
To stay home that day
Why did Sharon stay away?
...
Who know why Five Israelis was filming the explosion
And cracking they sides at the notion

In comments a week after this reading, Baraka was quoted by New Jersey's largest newspaper The Star-Ledger: "The Israelis knew about it just like Bush knew about it, just like the Germans knew about it, just like the French knew about it. Bush couldn't hope for a better legitimization of his trying to make the Middle East a gas station." Despite this, Baraka denies that his poem is anti-Semitic pointing to the accusation in the poem's text which he claims is directed only against Israelis rather than Jews as a people. The Anti-Defamation League denounced the poem as antisemitic and have pointed to several examples of a long pattern of anti-Semitism in his work and public statements though Baraka and his defenders defined his position as Anti-Zionism.

Commenting on Baraka's poem and the resulting controversy, the state's first poet laureate Gerald Stern stated that he was "shocked at the stupidity of it" and remarked that the response to it was difficult to weigh—that although "we don't censor poets ... lies never serve good, and there was hate in it."

After Baraka's public reading, Governor McGreevey sought to remove Baraka from the poet laureate post. Baraka refused to resign and defied the state's right to remove him. On October 2, Baraka posting a defiant statement on his website stating in capital letters "I WILL NOT 'APOLOGIZE', I WILL NOT 'RESIGN!'" McGreevey and state officials learned that there was no legal way to remove Baraka in the law authorizing and defining the position. However, the city of Newark supported Baraka and his work, and responded to the attempts to remove him as poet laureate by appointing him to be the poet laureate of the Newark Public Schools in December 2002.

=== Repeal and aftermath ===
On October 17, 2002, legislation was introduced in the General Assembly to abolish the post. It was one of several bills offered to amend the law, make a declarative legislative statement in support of Baraka's resignation, or abolish the post. This bill sought to abolish the post and offered only two brief provisions to effect that goal:

1. P.L.1999, c.228 (C.52:16A-26.9) is hereby repealed.
2. This act shall take effect immediately.

The bill, proposed in the New Jersey State Senate passed in the senate with 21 votes supporting it and 19 abstentions. It passed the General Assembly by a 69-2 vote. This act was subsequently signed into law by Governor McGreevey on July 2, 2003 and it became effective immediately. Baraka ceased being poet laureate on that date.

Baraka proceeded to file a civil rights lawsuit under 42 U.S.C. §§ 1983 and 1988 and 28 U.S.C. § 2201 in the United States District Court for the District of New Jersey to challenge his dismissal and the elimination of the post supported by allegations that his free speech rights had been violated and alleged that McGreevey and other state officials had retaliated against him. However, U.S. District Court Judge Garrett E. Brown, Jr., dismissed Baraka's claim citing that he failed to state a grounds on which relief could be granted and under the state's legislative immunity protections provided by the Eleventh Amendment to the United States Constitution. On March 21, 2007, the United States Court of Appeals for the Third Circuit affirmed the lower court's decision and ruled that state officials were immune from such suits. This appellate decision further stated that "Baraka, like any person, was free to speak his views. But he had no protected legal interest in the maintenance of the position of poet laureate of New Jersey." Without providing comment and affirming the Third Circuit's decision, the Supreme Court of the United States declined to hear the case by denying Baraka's Petition for a Writ for Certiorari.

== List of poets laureate of New Jersey ==
#	Portrait	Poet Laureate	Term began	Term ended	Appointing governor	Notes and remarks
1		Gerald Stern (1925–2022)	April 17, 2000	July 2002	Christine Todd Whitman	
2		Amiri Baraka (also known as LeRoi Jones and Imamu Amear Baraka) (1934–2014)	August 28, 2002	July 2, 2003	James E. McGreevey	Asked to resign after public reading of a controversial poem "Somebody Blew Up America", Baraka refused, igniting a political controversy; Because there was no mechanism in state law to remove Baraka, state legislature and governor abolished the post with legislation signed into law on July 2, 2003.

== See also ==
- Poet laureate
- List of U.S. state poets laureate
- Poet Laureate Consultant in Poetry to the Library of Congress
- Poet Laureate of the United Kingdom
