= Gerald Stern =

American poet, essayist, educator (1925–2022)

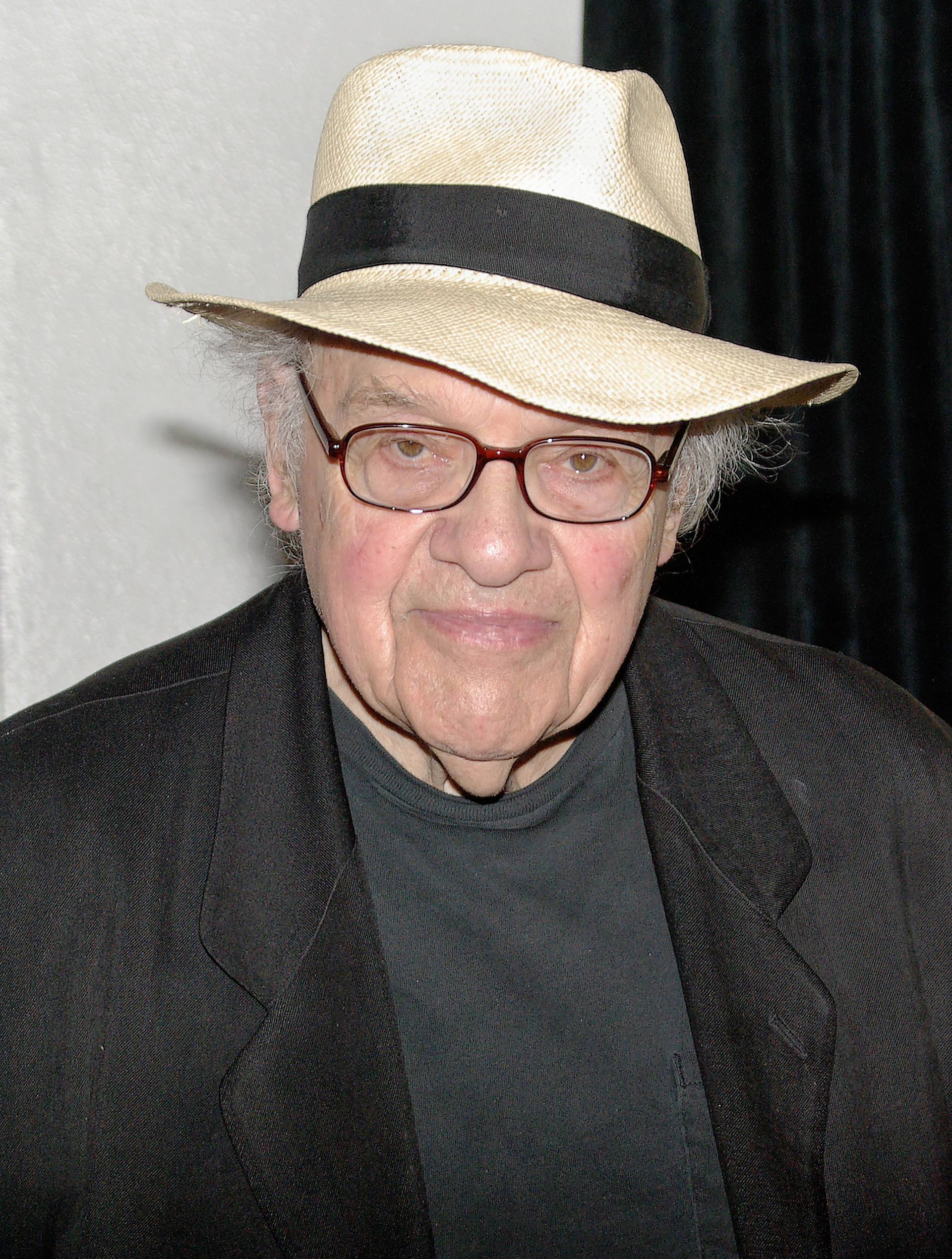
- Stern at the Miami Book Fair International in 2011
- Born: February 22, 1925; Pittsburgh, Pennsylvania, U.S.
- Died: October 27, 2022 (aged 97); New York City, U.S.
- Education: University of Pittsburgh (BA); Columbia University (MA); University of Paris
- Occupations: Poet; essayist; educator
- Spouse: Patricia Miller (m. 1952, divorced)
- Partner: Anne Marie Macari
- Children: 2

Gerald Daniel Stern (February 22, 1925 – October 27, 2022) was an American poet, essayist, and educator. The author of twenty collections of poetry and four books of essays, he taught literature and creative writing at Temple University, Indiana University of Pennsylvania, Raritan Valley Community College and the Iowa Writers' Workshop. From 2009 until his death, he was a distinguished poet-in-residence and faculty member of Drew University's graduate program for a Master of Fine Arts (MFA) in poetry.

Stern was a graduate of the University of Pittsburgh and Columbia University and attended the University of Paris for post-graduate study. He received the National Book Award for Poetry in 1998 for This Time: New and Selected Poems and was named a finalist for the Pulitzer Prize in Poetry in 1991 for Leaving Another Kingdom: Selected Poems. In 2000, Governor Christine Todd Whitman appointed him the first Poet Laureate of New Jersey.

== Early life ==
Stern was born in Pittsburgh, Pennsylvania, on February 22, 1925. His parents, Harry and Ida Barach Stern, were Jewish and immigrated to the United States from Ukraine and Poland, respectively, in 1905. They owned several clothing stores and sold other items including cigars. Stern attended Taylor Allderdice High School in his hometown, graduating in 1942. He was initially rejected from military service due to his poor eyesight, but served in the Army Air Forces from 1946 to 1947 after the military re-examined him. He studied at the University of Pittsburgh, graduating with a Bachelor of Arts in 1947. Two years later, he obtained a Master of Arts from Columbia University.

== Career ==
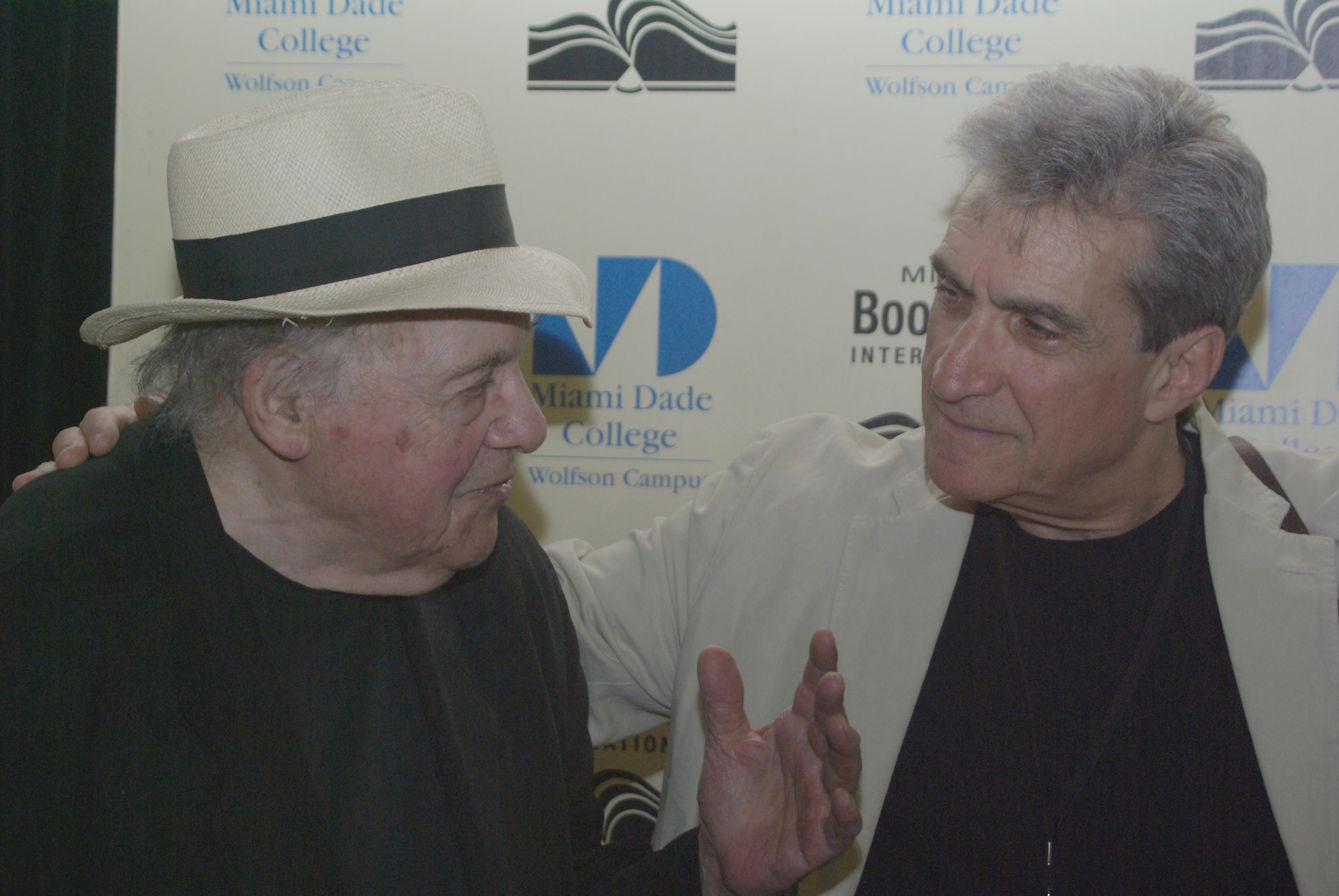
Stern with Robert Pinsky

After earning his master's degree, Stern relocated to Europe to undertake doctoral studies at the University of Paris. However, he did not finish his degree and spent his twenties traveling between New York City and Europe. It was during this time that he started to write and publish poetry. Stern went back to the U.S. in 1956 and started teaching at Temple University. He remained there for seven years and left after being unable to receive tenure. He subsequently taught at Indiana University of Pennsylvania for four years. After a period of paid leave, he taught at Raritan Valley Community College in New Jersey, before briefly working at Pittsburgh (his alma mater) in 1979. He then went to the University of Iowa at the behest of the Iowa Writers' Workshop, and taught there for 14 years until his retirement in 1996. Stern came out of retirement to teach at Sarah Lawrence College for a while.

Stern published his first poem, "The Pineys", in 1969 in The Journal of the Rutgers University Library. Four years later, he released his first poetry collection titled Rejoicings. His work became widely recognized after the 1977 publication of his second collection, Lucky Life, which was that year's Lamont Poetry Selection, and was nominated for the National Book Critics Circle Award for Poetry. He also authored a series of essays on writing poetry in American Poetry Review. He went on to receive several awards for his writing, including the 1996 Ruth Lilly Poetry Prize, the 1998 National Book Award for This Time: New and Selected Poems, and the 2012 Library of Congress Rebekah Johnson Bobbitt National Award for Early Collected Poems: 1965–1992. He was Poet Laureate of New Jersey from 2000 to 2002, and received the Wallace Stevens Award from the Academy of American Poets in 2005. From 2006 on Stern was a chancellor of the Academy of American Poets.

In addition to the aforementioned academic institutions, Stern also taught at Rutgers University. During the mid-1970s, he was a literature consultant for both New Jersey and Pennsylvania Council of the Arts as well as a coordinator for Pennsylvania's poetry in schools program. Stern was a faculty member and co-founder of New England College's Master of Fine Arts Program in Poetry.

== Personal life ==
Stern married Patricia Miller in 1952. They had two children together. They divorced in the 1980s. He was in a domestic partnership with poet Anne Marie Macari during the last 25 years of his life, and he lived in New York City and Miami Beach, Florida.

Stern died on October 27, 2022, at the Calvary Hospice in New York City. He was 97 years old.

== Honors and awards ==
- 1976 National Endowment for the Arts Fellowship
- 1977 Lamont Poetry Selection
- 1980 Guggenheim Fellowship
- 1981 Melville Caine Award
- 1982 National Endowment for the Arts Fellowship
- 1987 National Endowment for the Arts Fellowship
- 1991 Pulitzer Prize in Poetry Finalist
- 1992 Paterson Poetry Prize
- 1996 Ruth Lilly Poetry Prize
- 1998 National Book Award for Poetry
- 2000–2002 Poet Laureate of New Jersey
- 2005 National Jewish Book Award in Poetry
- 2005 Wallace Stevens Award
- 2012 Library of Congress Rebekah Johnson Bobbitt National Award
