= Michael O'Brien (American poet) =

American poet

Michael O'Brien (January 29, 1939 – November 10, 2016) was an American poet.

He began his poetry career as part of the "Eventorium", a relatively obscure group of New York City artists with an interest in surrealism. O’Brien's early work is now extremely difficult to find, according to a 2007 review of his Sleeping and Waking by David Orr in The New York Times.

His book, Sleeping and Waking was a finalist for the 2007 National Book Critics Circle award. According to Orr, poetry critic of The New York Times, the poems in the collection are "heavy on isolated images, dream logic, bits of overheard conversation (typically urban conversation) and memories, with larger themes emerging through juxtapositions and repetitions. Indeed, many poems consist of nothing but juxtapositions and repetitions."

== Works ==
- Sleeping and Waking Flood Editions, 2007
- Sills: Selected Poems, Zoland, 2000
- At Schoodic, Cairn Editions, 2000
- The Ruin, an assortment of translations, 1986
- The Summer Poems, Eventorium Press, 1967
