= I Would Know You Anywhere =

Indian poem

"I Would Know You Anywhere" is an Indian poem on the popular Hindu god Ganesha by the Indian English poet Revathy Gopal. The poem won Second Prize in the Ninth All India Poetry Competition conducted by The Poetry Society (India) in 2000. This was the second major literary award for Revathy, who had also won second prize in the eighth All India Poetry Competition.

== Comments and criticism ==
The poem has been featured in several anthologies of Indian English literary works.

== Online references ==
- Sacred Songs – I Would Know You Anywhere by Revathy Gopal

== See also ==
- Indian English Poetry
- The Poetry Society (India)
