= David Schubert =

American poet

David Schubert (1913–1946) was an American poet.

== Life ==
Schubert was born October 18, 1913, in New York City; the family moved shortly to Detroit. When he was 12, his father left them, and his mother committed suicide. David was sent to live with relations in Brooklyn. He attended Boys High School. Homeless from age 15, he won a scholarship to Amherst College.

Despite sympathetic help from Robert Frost and John R. Theobald (1903–1989), Schubert dropped out of Amherst, his focus being entirely on poetry. He worked for the Civilian Conservation Corps and as a farm laborer. At age 20, he married Judith Ehre, a teacher in New York. The couple had a circle of friends including Mark Rothko.

Finding work at the Brooklyn Institute of Arts and Science, Schubert wrote, while studying at CUNY and Columbia University. He cut short a visit to the Yaddo community, and suffered from depression. Judith contacted Karen Horney, who referred him to a psychiatrist.

David Schubert died of tuberculosis in Central Islip Psychiatric Center, at the age of 33.

== Works ==
Schubert had poems published in poetry magazines. During a breakdown, he destroyed a large portion of his work.

After Schubert's death, his former wife spent years piecing his poems together. She then found a publisher who put out Initial A in 1961. An expanded edition of his work was released in 1983 as Works and Days.

William Carlos Williams said of David Schubert: "To sit down for a little while and reread some of Schubert's rare and poignant verse is like opening a window in a room that had become stuffy without one's realizing it." John Ashbery dedicated a chapter of Other Traditions to Schubert, in which he relates coming to the same conclusion: "I myself value Schubert more than Pound or Eliot, and it's a relief to have an authority of the stature of Williams to back me up."
