= Shahnaz Habib =

Indian writer and translator

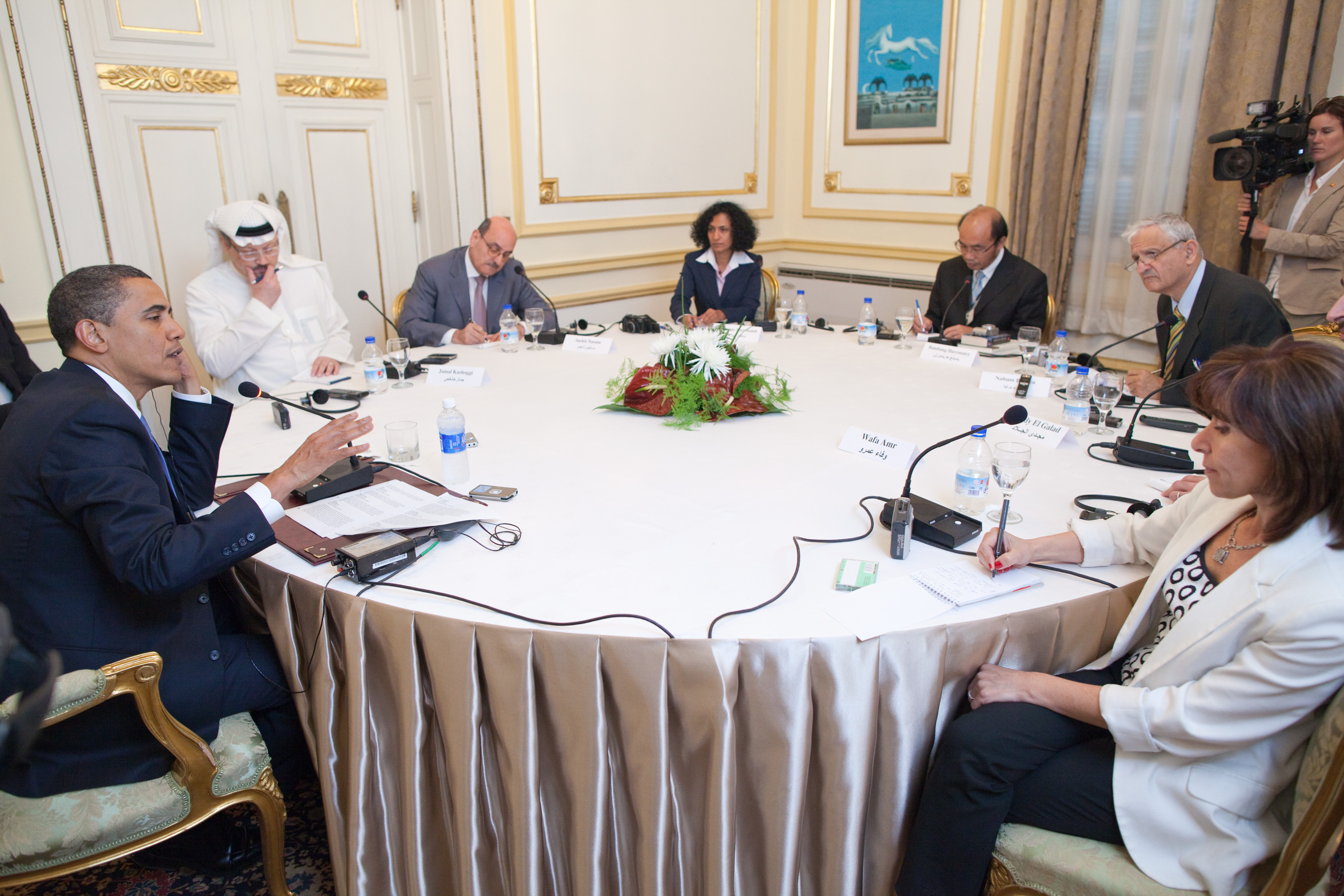
4 June 2009 − after his speech A New Beginning at Cairo University, U.S. President Obama, participates in a roundtable interview with among others Jamal Khashoggi, Shahnaz Habib, Bambang Harymurti and Nahum Barnea

Shahnaz Habib is an Indian essayist, fiction writer, travel writer, and translator based in the United States of America. She teaches writing at Bay Path University and The New School, and works as a consultant for the United Nations. In 2018, she received the JCB Prize for Literature.

== Biography ==
Habib grew up in Kerala, South India and is currently based in Brooklyn, New York. Her poem Of Hypocrisy and Cheekbones won the First Prize in the Ninth National Poetry Competition in 2000 organized by The Poetry Society (India) in collaboration with British Council. Her short story "Something Special About Sayyida" was selected for the anthology 21 under 40. Her essays, travel writing, and criticism have appeared in The Guardian, The New Yorker, Afar, the anthology Twentysomething Essays by Twentysomething Writers, and many other publications. Her work has twice been named to the Notable Essays and Literary Nonfiction list by the Best American Essays series.

== Awards ==
Her English translation of the novel Jasmine Days, from the Malayalam original by the author Benyamin, won the 2018 JCB Prize for Literature, which each year recognizes a distinguished work of fiction by an Indian writer working in English or translated fiction by an Indian writer.

She was awarded the New American Voices Award in 2024 by the Institute for Immigration Research in the US for her nonfiction book Airplane Mode.

== See also ==
- Indian English literature
- Indian poetry
- The Poetry Society (India)
