= Vijay Nambisan =

Indian poet, writer, critic, and journalist

Vijay Nambisan (1963 – August 10, 2017) was an Indian poet, writer, critic and journalist who primarily wrote in English. He won the first All India Poetry Prize in 1990. He died following health complications on the 10th of August, 2017.

== Literary career ==
Both debut authors, Vijay Nambisan and Jeet Thayil, co-authored Gemini in 1992. Nambisan received the first All India Poetry Prize in 1988 for his poem "Madras Central". He wrote First Infinities in 2015, his first collection of poems since Gemini. Additionally, he wrote several non-fiction books including: Bihar Is in the Eye of the Beholder in 2000, Language as an Ethic in 2003, and Two Measures of Bhakti in 2009, which include translations of works by Poonthanam Nambudiri and Melpathur Narayana Bhattathiri.

== Personal life ==
Vijay Nambisan graduated from IIT Madras. He married the novelist and doctor Kavery Nambisan.

== Bibliography ==
Books

- Language as an Ethic (Essays) New Delhi: Penguin Books, India 2003. ISBN 978-0143030218
- Bihar is in the Eyes of the Beholder (Reflection) (Poetry in English). New Delhi: Viking, India 2000. ISBN 978-0670892402
- Gemini (Poems). New Delhi: Viking Books, India 1992.
- '’Puntanam and Melpattur: Two Measures of Bhakti'’ (Religion), Penguin Books, India New Delhi (2009). ISBN 978-0143064480

=== Online references ===
- Book Reviews in DNA by Vijay Nambisan
- ‘’Reasons of Belonging’’ -“Fourteen Contemporary Indian Poets” by Ranjit Hoskote

== See also ==
- Kaveri Nambisan – A Biography
- Indian Poets Writing in English
- The Poetry Society (India)
