= Srinivas Rath =

Srinivas Rath was an eminent Sanskrit poet born in Puri, Odisha. He lived at Ujjain, India and was instrumental in the sustenance of the Kalidas Akademi, a center of arts and literature in Western India. Rath Sahib, as he was called by many, had written a collection of poems entitled "tad eva gaganam saiva dhara," published by the Rashtriya Sanskrit Sansthan in the 1990s (already two impressions), which won a Sahitya Akademi Award for 1999, and completed a mahakavya entitled Baladevacarita.

Poems of Prof. Rath depict the establishment with Indian culture, patriotism, social reformation, humanitarian significance and philanthropic attitude. His poetic presentation in lucid style with lyrical excellence attracts the minds of the readers. In the modern age of scientific progress, the poet observes the deterioration of human value and ethical importance. Many inhuman activities are found in the social sphere. To eradicate the pollutions from socio-cultural arena, the poet has endeavoured much in his lyrical expressions.

Poet Rath was Retired Professor and Head of School of Studies in Sanskrit, Vikram University, Ujjain, Madhya Pradesh of India and Ex-Director of Kalidasa Academy of Ujjain. He was Chairman of Sanskrit Kavi Sammelan on 7 January 1997 organized by 10th World Sanskrit Conference (3-9 January 1997) held at Taralabalu Kendra, Bangalare. His contributions to the field of Modern Sanskrit Literature are very much appreciable. On 13 June 2014 he took his last breath living behind three sons and family at Ujjain.
