= Justin D. Edwards =

Professor

Justin D. Edwards (1970–2023) was a Canadian-British professor in the Division of Literature and Languages and chair of Gothic Studies at University of Stirling. Previously chair of English at the University of Surrey and professor and head of English at Bangor University, he was elected by-fellow of Churchill College, Cambridge, in 2005. Edwards received an M.A and Ph.D. in English from the Université de Montréal, where he completed his doctoral dissertation on 19th- and early 20th-century U.S. travel literature. Between 1995 and 2005, he taught at the Université de Montréal and the University of Copenhagen, where he was appointed as an associate professor in 2002. He held an affiliate professorship in U.S. literature at the University of Copenhagen and in 2016–2017 he was a Fulbright scholar at Elon University, North Carolina.

== Work ==
=== Gothic literature ===
Edwards' contribution to the study of gothic literature started with Gothic Passages: Racial Ambiguity and the American Gothic, which examines the development of U.S. gothic literature alongside 19th-century discourses of passing and racial ambiguity. This book focuses on the way in which writers of the period "gothicized" biracial and passing figures in order to frame them within the rubric of a demonization of difference. In Gothic Canada: Reading the Spectre of a National Literature, he continued in the area by examining how collective stories about national identity and belonging tend to be haunted by artifice.

=== Postcolonialism ===
His work in the field of postcolonialism, growing out of his work on travel writing, started with Exotic Journeys: Exploring the Erotics of U.S. Travel Literature, which examines the place of travel writing in the rhetoric of imperial expansion and colonial ideology. In this project, he focused on representations of sexuality and eroticism in 19th- and early 20th-century U.S. travel literature to capture defining moments in the formation of an American national identity. This book led to a collaborative work compiling an anthology of Asian and African travel literature, Other Routes: 1500 Years of African and Asian Travel Writing, which collects primary pieces by travel writers from Asia and Africa stretching from the fifth to the 19th centuries.

== Works ==
- American Modernism Across the Arts (1999) (edited with Jay Bochner)
- Exotic Journeys: Exploring the Erotics of U.S. Travel Literature, 1840-1930 (2001)
- Gothic Passages: Racial Ambiguity and the American Gothic (2003)
- Downtown Canada: Writing Canadian Cities (2005) (edited with Douglas Ivison)
- Gothic Canada: Reading the Spectre of a National Literature (2005)
- Other Routes: 1500 Years of Travel Writing by Asians and Africans (2006) (edited with Tabish Khair, Martin Leer, and Hanna Ziadeh)
- Postcolonial Travel Writing: Critical Explorations (2012) (edited with Rune Graulund)
- Mobility at Large: Globalization, Textuality and Innovative Travel Writing (2012) (co-authored with Rune Graulund)
- Gothic in Contemporary Literature and Popular Culture: Pop Goth (2012) (edited with Agnieszka Soltysik Monnet)
- Grotesque (2013) (co-authored with Rune Graulund)
- Technologies of the Gothic in Literature and Culture: Technogothics (2015) (edited)
- Tropical Gothic in Literature and Culture: The Americas (2016) (edited with Sandra G. T. Vasconcelos)
- B-Movie Gothic: International Perspectives (2018) (edited with Johan Höglund)
- Dark Scenes from Damaged Earth: The Gothic Anthropocene (2022) (edited with Rune Graulund and Johan Höglund)
