= The Poetry Society (India) =

Society for promotion of Indian poetry

The Poetry Society (India) was formed in July 1984 at New Delhi as a voluntary association to promote Indian poetry and to look after the interests of Indian Poets.The founding members included the Indian poets Keshav Malik, J P Das, H K Kaul and Lakshmi Kannan. The Society conducts seminars, creative writing workshops, reading and publication of poetry journal and anthologies. It also conducts All India Poetry Competitions, including competitions among school children.

== The Journal of the Poetry Society ==
The Poetry Society also publishes a half yearly Poetry Journal. It was started in 1990 and it publishes the best of Indian poetry written in English, including those translated from Indian languages. The journal also publishes book reviews and literary criticism. The society has been conducting all Indian poetry competition among school children.

== All India Poetry Competition ==
SInce 1988, The Poetry Society (India) has been conducting All India Poetry Competitions in collaboration with the British Council. The competition is open for all Indian citizen for their original poems written in English or for poems translated into English from any of the recognised Indian languages. Thousands of poets have participated in these challenging competitions, in which the number of prizes are very few. The judges, consisting of eminent poets from India and abroad, evaluate the poems without knowing the identity of the poets participating in the competition. The competitions organised by the Poetry Society are among the premier Indian Poetry Awards.

The following poets have won the All India Poetry Competitions organised by the Poetry Society (India):

- 1988 : First Prize - Vijay Nambisan for the poem "Madras Central"
- 1990 : First Prize - Rukmini Bhaya Nair for the poem "Kali"
- 1991 : First Prize - Rajlukshmee Debee Bhattacharya for the poem "Punarnava"
- 1993 : First Prize - Shampa Sinha for the poem "Siesta", and Second Prize - Tarun Cherian for the poem "A Writer's Prayer"
- 1994 : First Prize - Anju Makhija for the poem "A Farmer's Ghost", and Second Prize - Smita Agarwal for the poem "Our Foster Nurse of Nature is Repose"
- 1995 : First Prize - Tabish Khair for the poem "Birds of North Europe", and Second Prize - Gopi Krishnan Kottoor for the poem "The Coffin Maker"
- 1997 : First Prize - Ranjit Hoskote for the poem "Portrait of a Lady", Second Prize - Gopi Krishnan Kottoor for the poem "Digging", and Special All India Prize for a theme related to Indian Independence Raghav.G.Nair for his poem " These Are The Things We Could Talk About" and "Independence Day" by Tara Sehgal.
- 1998 : First Prize - K. Sri Lata for the poem "In Santa Cruz, Diagnosed Home Sick", and Second Prize - Revathy Gopal for the poem "Lines on Meeting a Cousin, Long Lost"
- 2000 : First Prize - Shahnaz Habib for the poem "Of Hypocrisy and Cheekbones", and Second Prize - Revathy Gopal for the poem "I Would Know You Anywhere"
- 2013 : First Prize - Mathew John for the poem "Another Letter from Another Father to Another Son", Second Prize - N Madani Syed for "That Yellow Sweater", Tapan Kumar Pradhan for "The Buddha Smiled".
- 2014 : First Prize - Probal Mazumdar for the poem "Grand Mother", Second Prize - Vidya S. Panicker for "A Suitcase Too Small", and Third - N Madani Syed for "A Song to Sing"
- 2015 : (ENGLISH) :- First Prize (English) - Sukanya Shaji for the poem "Pilgrimage", Second Prize - Debrup Bhattacharya for "Star's Demise", and Third Prize - K. E. Priyamvada for "Fireflies"; (HINDI) :- First Prize - Parul Gupta for the poem "Bhukamp", Second Prize - Amit Bisht for "Ek Kisaan ka Suicide Note", and Third Prize - Rajesh Ahuja for "Man-Manthan"
- 2016 : (ENGLISH) :- First Prize - Yatiraj Ramanujam for the poem "A Sudden Voyage", Second Prize- Shrestha Ghosh for "A Dream", and Third Prize - Maitri S Shah for "Violence of the Truth"; (HINDI) :- First Prize - Gaurav J. Pathania for the poem "Plastic", Second Prize - Neelam Saxena for "Khushi", and Third Prize - Monika Bhambhu Kalana for "Tumhare Laut Aane ki Khushi Mein"
- 2017 : (ENGLISH) :- First Prize - Gopikrishnan Kottoor for the poem "The Painter of Evenings", Second Prize- Asha Viswas for the poem "The Beggar Girl".

There were no awards between 2000 and 2013. Till 2000, the awards were sponsored by the British Council. Since 2013, the awards are being co-sponsored by the MHRD

== See also ==
- Manipuri Sahitya Parishad
- Sahitya Akademi
