= Of Hypocrisy and Cheekbones =

"Of Hypocrisy and Cheekbones" is an Indian poem by the Indian English writer and translator, Shahnaz Habib. The poem won first place at the Ninth All India Poetry Competition held by The Poetry Society (India) in 2000.

== Comments and criticism ==
The poem has received critical attention since its first publication in 2000 in the book Emerging Voices and has since been anthologised. It has been quoted in scholarly analysis of contemporary Indian English poetry.

== See also ==
- The Poetry Society (India)
