= Swarnalatha Rangarajan =

Indian academic and writer

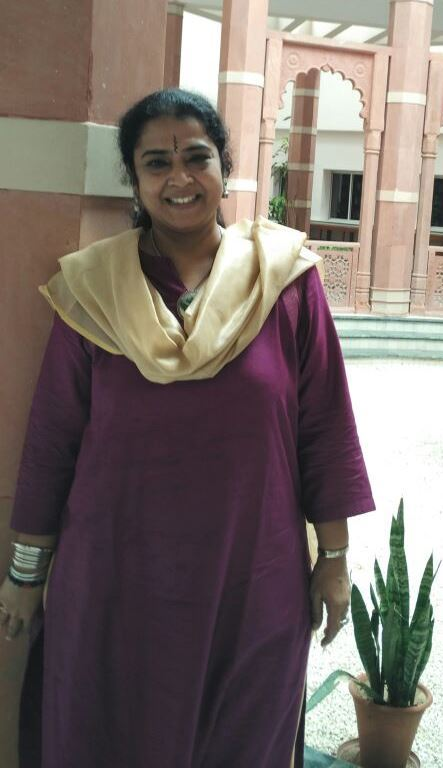
Swarnalatha Rangarajan

Swarnalatha Rangarajan is an Indian academic and writer, specialising in ecocriticism and ecological fiction. She has written a monograph on ecocriticism and has edited books and journals on ecocriticism and Ecosophy. She has published short stories, poetry, and one novel. She is a professor of English at the Department of Humanities and Social Sciences, IIT Madras.

== Academic career ==
Rangarajan studied English at the University of Madras, receiving her MA in 1992 and her MPhil in 1993. In 1999–2000, Rangarajan was a Fulbright pre-doctoral fellow at Harvard University. She took her PhD at the University of Madras in 2002.

She was Professor of English and Comparative Religions at the Department of Humanities in BITS Pilani.

She was Charles Wallace India Trust Visiting Fellow at the Centre for Research in the Arts, Social Sciences and Humanities (CRASSH) at Cambridge University in 2013.

She has been a professor of English at the Department of Humanities and Social Sciences, IIT Madras, since 2010.

She is the founding editor of the Indian Journal of Ecocriticism (IJE) and served as a guest editor for special issues on Indian ecosophy for Canadian journal The Trumpeter. She has published articles on ecocriticism in several journals.

She has co-edited books including Ecoambiguity, Community, and Development: Toward a Politicized Ecocriticism (2014) and Ecocriticism of the Global South (2015). In 2024, she co-edited The Bloomsbury Handbook to the Medical-Environmental Humanities with Scott Slovic and Vidya Sarveswaran.

Her monograph Ecocriticism: Big Ideas and Practical Solutions appeared in 2018.

She co-translated Mayilamma: The Life of a Tribal Eco-Warrior (Orient Blackswan, 2018) and co-edited a collection of interviews with contemporary women writers from Tamil Nadu, Lifescapes: Interviews with Contemporary Women Writers from Tamil Nadu, in 2019.

== Writing career ==
Rangarajan's short fiction has been published in journals including South Asian Review, New Asian Writing, India Currents, Asia Writes, and Out of Print Magazine. Her poetry has appeared in the collection All the Worlds Between (Yoda Press, 2017) and in Muse India.

Her first novel, Final Instructions (Authorspress), was published in 2015. It is inspired by the Bhopal disaster.
