= Tabish Khair =

Indian writer

Tabish Khair (born 1966) is an Indian English author and associate professor in the Department of English, University of Aarhus, Denmark. His books include Babu Fictions (2001); The Bus Stopped (2004), which was shortlisted for the Encore Award; and The Thing About Thugs (2010), which was shortlisted for the DSC Prize for South Asian Literature and the Man Asian Literary Prize. His poem "Birds of North Europe" won first prize in the sixth Poetry Society All India Poetry Competition held in 1995. In 2022, he published a sci-fi novel, The Body by the Shore. He is based in Denmark.

== Biography ==
Khair was born in Ranchi and grew up in Gaya, India. He attended Magadh University. He worked as a reporter for the The Times of India before moving to Copenhagen. He has received honours and awards including first prize in the sixth Poetry Society Competition held in 1995, an honorary fellowship for creative writing from the Hong Kong Baptist University, a fellowship at Delhi University, and a by-fellowship at Churchill College, Cambridge.

Other Routes (2005), an anthology of travel writing by African and Asian writers, was edited by Khair, Martin Leer, Justin D. Edwards, and Hanna Ziadeh (with a foreword by Amitav Ghosh). Khair's Encore Award-shortlisted novel, The Bus Stopped, has been translated into French, Italian, and Portuguese.

His novel Filming (2007) is set against the backdrop of the Partition of India and the 1940s Bombay film industry. An excerpt of the novel was anthologised in Ahmede Hussain's The New Anthem: The Subcontinent in its Own Words. In June 2008, it was shortlisted for the Crossword Book Award in India.

Khair's study The Gothic, Postcolonialism and Otherness was released by Palgrave Macmillan in the UK and US in the winter of 2009. His novel The Thing About Thugs was published by HarperCollins in summer 2010 and shortlisted for The Hindu Best Fiction Award 2010, the DSC Prize for South Asian Literature 2012, and Man Asian Literary Prize 2010. Khair's works have been translated into various languages; the Danish translation of Filming: A Love Story was shortlisted for Denmark's top translation/literature award, the ALOA Prize.

His novel How to Fight Islamist Terror from the Missionary Position was released in India in 2012.

== Publications ==
=== Books ===
- Where Parallel Lines Meet. Penguin. 2000. ISBN 9780670894321.
- Babu Fictions: Alienation in Indian English Novels. Oxford University Press. 2001. ISBN 9780195652963.
- The Bus Stopped. Picador. 2004. ISBN 978-0-330-41921-5.
- Other Routes. Co-edited with Justin D. Edwards, Martin Leer, and Hanna Ziadeh. Signal Books/Indiana University Press. 2006. ISBN 9781904955122.
- Filming: A Love Story. Picador. 2007. ISBN 9780330419222.
- The Gothic, Postcolonialism and Otherness: Ghosts from Elsewhere. Palgrave. 2009. ISBN 9780230234062.
- Man of Glass: Poems. HarperCollins. 2010. ISBN 9788172239794.
- The Thing About Thugs. HarperCollins. 2010. ISBN 9788172239787.
- Reading Literature Today: Two Complementary Essays and a Conversation. Co-authored with Sebastien Doubinsky. Sage. 2011. ISBN 9788132106883.
- How to Fight Islamist Terror from the Missionary Position. HarperCollins. 2012. ISBN 9789350293225.
- The New Xenophobia. Oxford University Press. 2016. ISBN 9780199463589.
- Jihadi Jane. Penguin India. 2016. ISBN 9780143426424.
- Just Another Jihadi Jane. Periscope/Interlink. 2016. ISBN 9781902932545.
- Night of Happiness. Picador India. 2018. ISBN 9781529000979.
- The Body by the Shore. HarperCollins India. 2022. ISBN 978-93-5629-290-1.
- Namaste Trump and Other Stories. Interlink Books. 2023. ISBN 978-1-62371-748-3.
- Literature Against Fundamentalism. Oxford University Press. 2024. ISBN 978-0-19-891958-2.
- Drown All the Refugees. HarperCollins India. 2026. ISBN 9789373074740.

=== Anthology chapters ===
- A New Book of Indian Poems in English (2000), ed. by Gopi Kottoor, Poetry Chain/Writers Workshop
- Travelogue: The Grand Indian Express (2018), ed. by Ananad Kumar, Authorspress
