= 2009 in poetry =

Nationality words link to articles with information on the nation's poetry or literature (for instance, Irish or France).

== Events ==
- January 5 – The Turkish government announces it will posthumously restore the citizenship it had stripped from influential poet Nâzım Hikmet, a Marxist who died in 1963 as an exile in the Soviet Union.
- January 20 – Poet Elizabeth Alexander reads "Praise Song for the Day" at presidential inauguration of President Barack Obama.
- February 9 – Eritrean poet and broadcaster Yirgalem Fisseha Mebrahtu is arbitrarily arrested and begins 6 years imprisonment without trial.
- March 16 – Nicholas Hughes, 47, the son of the poets Ted Hughes (British poet laureate 1984–98) and Sylvia Plath, who famously committed suicide in 1963 when her son was a year old, hangs himself in his home in Alaska. He had suffered from depression.
- May 1 – Carol Ann Duffy is appointed Poet Laureate of the United Kingdom, the first woman appointed to the position in its 341-year history, a position that has been held by, among others, John Dryden (whom Charles II named the first official poet laureate ), Tennyson, Wordsworth and Cecil Day-Lewis. Duffy is also the first Scot and the first openly gay occupant of the post.
- May 5 – Posthumous publication of J. R. R. Tolkien's narrative poem The Legend of Sigurd and Gudrún in alliterative verse based on the 13th century Poetic Edda and probably written in the 1930s.
- May 16 & May 25 – Ruth Padel becomes the first female ever elected Professor of Poetry at the University of Oxford but resigns nine days later after she is alleged to have been involved in what some sources refer to as a smear campaign against Derek Walcott, her leading rival for the post.
- June 25 – American pop singer Michael Jackson dies of an acute propofol intoxication at the age of 50.
- July 30 – Last Post, a poem by Carol Ann Duffy, the Poet Laureate of the United Kingdom, is read on the BBC Radio 4 programme Today. Commissioned by the BBC to mark the deaths of Henry Allingham and Harry Patch, two of the last three surviving British veterans of the World War I, it is read on the day of Allingham's funeral.
- September 18 – The film Bright Star, about John Keats and his relationship with Fanny Brawne, is released in the United States, and on November 6 in the United Kingdom. The film's title is a reference to a sonnet by Keats, "Bright star, would I were stedfast as thou art", written at the time of the love affair. Jane Campion directed the movie.
- A Room and a Half, a Russian film directed by Andrey Khrzhanovsky and based on the life of Russian–American poet Joseph Brodsky, is released. It is distributed in the United States in 2010.

== Works published in English ==
Listed by nation where the work was first published and again by the poet's native land, if different; substantially revised works listed separately:

=== Australia ===
- Robert Adamson, The Best Australian Poems, Black Inc., ISBN 978-1-86395-452-5, anthology including works by Ivy Alvarez, Judith Beveridge, Sarah K. Bell, Jen Jewel Brown, Anne Elvey, Lisa Gorton, Clive James, Les Murray, Dorothy Porter, Peter Porter, Thomas Shapcott, Alex Skovron, John Tranter, and Chris Wallace-Crabbe.
- Stephen Edgar, Other Summers, 109 pp; Melbourne: Black Pepper, ISBN 978-1-876044-62-6
- Jennifer Harrison and Kate Waterhouse, editors, Motherlode: Australian Women's Poetry 1986 – 2008, 120 poets represented, 342 pp, Glebe, New South Wales: Puncher and Wattmann, ISBN 978-1-921450-16-7, anthology
- Emma Jones, The Striped World, winner of the 2009 Arts Queensland Judith Wright Calanthe Award; Faber and Faber
- Martin Langford:
  - editor, Harbour City Poems: Sydney in Verse 1788–2008, Glebe, New South Wales: Puncher and Wattmann, ISBN 978-1-921450-17-4, anthology
  - The Human Project: New and Selected Poems
- Leonard, John (ed.), The Puncher & Wattmann Anthology of Australian Poetry, Puncher & Wattmann. ISBN 978-1-9214-5029-7
- John Kinsella, The Penguin Anthology of Australian Poetry, Penguin Group (Australia)
- Les Murray, Killing the Black Dog, Black Inc., ISBN 978-1-86395-447-1
- Page, Geoff (ed.), 60 Classic Australian Poems (an anthology), University of New South Wales Press. ISBN 978-1-9214-1079-6
- Dorothy Porter, The Bee Hut, Black Inc., ISBN 978-1-86395-446-4
- Nathan Shepherdson, Apples With Human Skin, St. Lucia, Queensland: University of Queensland Press, ISBN 978-0-7022-3741-6
- Alan Wearne, guest editor, The Best Australian Poetry 2009, University of Queensland Press, ISBN 978-0-7022-3736-2
- Les Wicks The Ambrosiacs (Island Press (Australia))
  - editor, Guide to Sydney Beaches Meuse Press

=== Canada ===
- Margaret Avison, Listening: The Last Poems, posthumously published
- Robert Bringhurst, Selected Poems
- Jan Conn, Botero's Beautiful Horses, Brick Books
- Barry Dempster, Love Outlandish, Brick Books
- Kate Eichhorn and Heather Milne, editors, Prismatic Publics: Innovative Canadian Women's Poetry and Poetics, Coach House Books, ISBN 978-1-55245-221-9; an anthology of 15 poets: Nicole Brossard, Margaret Christakos, Susan Holbrook, Dorothy Trujillo Lusk, Karen Mac Cormack, Daphne Marlatt, Erín Moure, M. NourbeSe Philip, Sina Queyras, Lisa Robertson, Gail Scott, Nathalie Stephens, Catriona Strang, Rita Wong, and Rachel Zolf
- Kim Goldberg, Red Zone, Pig Squash Press
- Chris Hutchinson, Other People's Lives, Brick Books
- Adeena Karasick, Amuse Bouche
- Douglas Lochhead, Looking into Trees
- Jeanette Lynes, The New Blue Distance
- Susan Musgrave, When the World Is Not Our Home: Selected Poems, 1985–2000
- Soraya Peerbaye, Poems for the Advisory Committee on Antarctic Names
- Marguerite Pigeon, Inventory
- Sina Queyras, Expressway, Coach House Books
- James Reaney, The Essential James Reaney. Brian Bartlett, ed., Porcupine's Quill
- Laisha Rosnau, Lousy Explorers, Nightwood Editions
- Stephen Rowe, Never More There, Nightwood Editions
- Carolyn Smart, Hooked, Brick Books
- Carmine Starnino, This Way Out, Gaspereau Press
- Fred Wah, Is a Door
- David Zieroth, The Fly in Autumn, Harbour Publishing

=== India, Indian poetry in English ===
- Anju Makhija, E V Ramakrishan, editors, We Speak in Changing Languages: Indian Women Poets 1990–2007, anthology, New Delhi: Sahitya Akademi
- Anthony Theodore, The Song of My Dance and Dance of My Dreams, ISBN 978-14-389511-9-5
- Arundhathi Subramaniam, editor, Hot is the Moon: Poems and Stories of Women in Kannada, Tamil, Konkani And Tulu, anthology in various languages, with translations into English; Mumbai: Sparrow
- Eunice de Souza, A Necklace of Skulls, Collected Poems ( Poetry in English), New Delhi: Penguin
- Uddipana Goswami, We Called the River Red ( Poetry in English ), Authorspress
- Yash Sharma, Tale of a Virgin River, translated into English by Anil Sehgal from the original Dogri; released with a CD of six songs composed and sung by the poet's daughter, Seema Anil Sehgal, a prominent singer; published in Singapore

=== Ireland ===
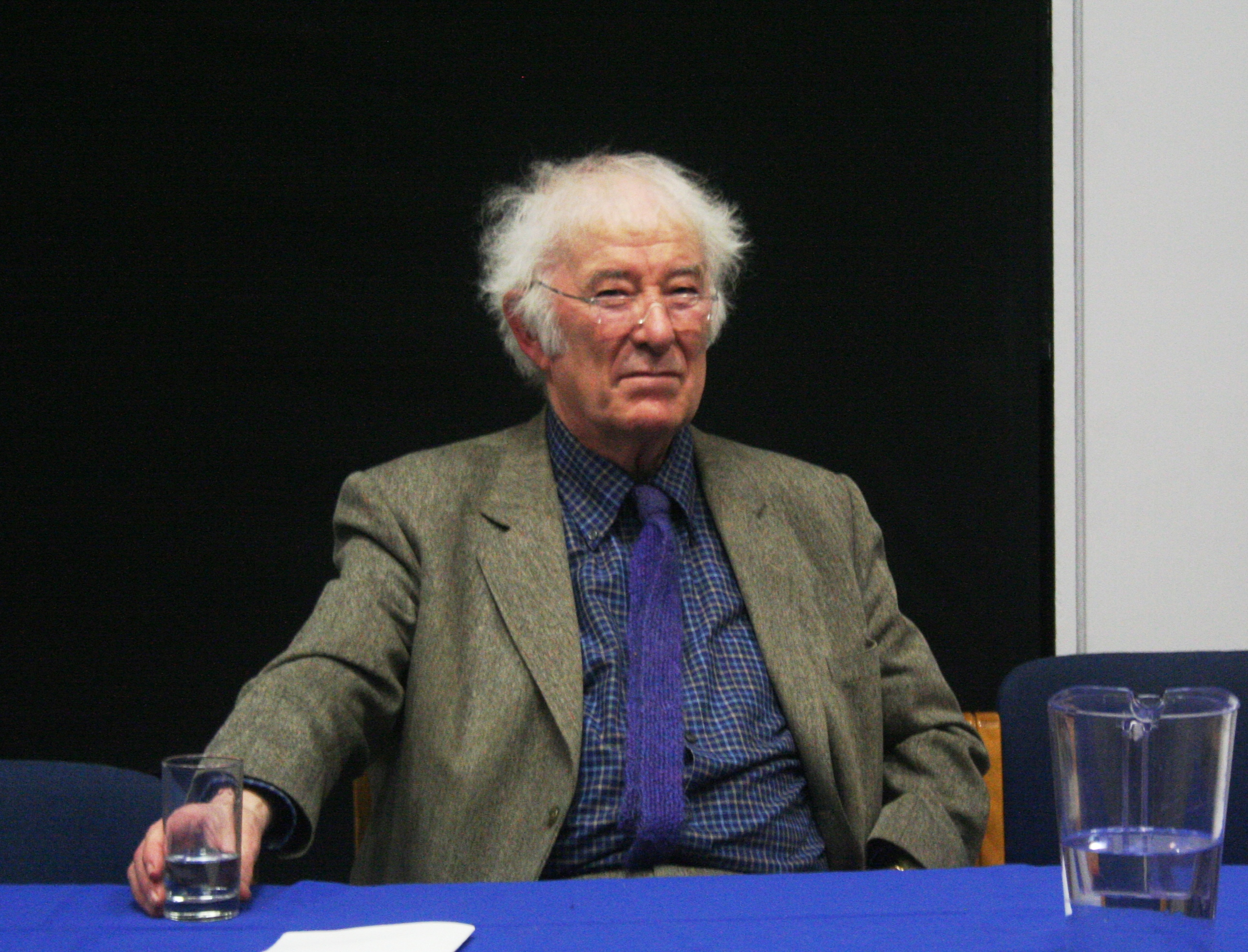
Seamus Heaney addresses the Law Society (University College Dublin), this year

- Michael Coady, Going by Water, Oldcastle, County Meath: Gallery Press
- Ray Givans, Tolstoy in Love, 82 pages, ISBN 978-1-906614-08-9
- Kerry Hardie, Only This Room, Oldcastle, County Meath: Gallery Press
- Ron Houchin, Museum Crows, 84 pages, Cliffs of Moher, County Clare: Salmon Press, ISBN 978-1-907056-17-8
- Dorothy Molloy, Long-distance Swimmer, 60 pages, Cliffs of Moher, County Clare: Salmon Press, ISBN 978-1-907056-21-5, posthumously published (died 2004)
- Paul Muldoon, Wayside Shrines, 40 pages, Oldcastle, County Meath: Gallery Press, ISBN 978-1-85235-479-4
- Eiléan Ní Chuilleanáin, The Sun-fish, Oldcastle, County Meath: Gallery Press
- Matthew Sweeney, Best of Irish Poetry 2010, Southword Editions, including work by Seamus Heaney, Michael Longley, Paul Muldoon, Michael McKimm, Leanne O'Sullivan, Leontia Flynn, Eva Bourke and Kerry Hardie
- Peggy O'Brien, Frog Spotting, 87 pages, Dedalus Press, ISBN 978-1-906614-06-5
- Stephen Roger Powers, The Follower's Tale, 100 pages, Cliffs of Moher, County Clare: Salmon Press, ISBN 978-1-907056-20-8
- Gabriel Rosenstock, Uttering Her Name, 126 pages, Cliffs of Moher, County Clare: Salmon Press, ISBN 978-1-907056-19-2
- A.E. Stringer, Human Costume, 100 pages, Cliffs of Moher, County Clare: Salmon Press, ISBN 978-1-907056-18-5
- Enda Wyley, To Wake to This, Dedalus Press, ISBN 978-1-906614-11-9

=== New Zealand ===
- Stephanie de Montalk, Vivid Familiar, Victoria University Press ISBN 9780864735980
- Jessica Le Bas Walking to Africa, Auckland University Press ISBN 9781869404468
- Tusiata Avia, Bloodclot, Victoria University Press ISBN 9780864735935

==== Poets in Best New Zealand Poems ====
Poems from these 25 poets were selected by James Brown for Best New Zealand Poems 2008, published online this year:

- Johanna Aitchison
- Hinemoana Baker
- Emma Barnes
- David Beach
- Peter Bland
- Jenny Bornholdt
- Amy Brown
- Cliff Fell
- Joan Fleming
- Bernadette Hall
- Sam Hunt
- Lynn Jenner
- Michele Leggott
- Jean McCormack
- Emma Neale
- Gregory O'Brien
- Bob Orr
- Chris Orsman
- Richard Reeve
- Sam Sampson
- Kerrin P. Sharpe
- Tim Upperton
- Richard von Sturmer
- Tom Weston
- Sonja Yelich

=== United Kingdom ===
- James Byrne, Blood/Sugar, ISBN 978-1-906570-29-3
- Caroline Grigson, editor, The Life and Poems of Anne Hunter: Haydn's Tuneful Voice (Hunter, 1742–1821, wrote lyrics to much of Haydn's music) Liverpool University Press (Liverpool English Texts and Studies) ISBN 978-1-84631-191-8
- Brian Henry, Quarantine::Contagion, ISBN 978-1-906570-13-2
- Luke Kennard, The Migraine Hotel, Salt, 96 pages, ISBN 978-1-84471-555-8
- Herbert Lomas, A Casual Knack of Living: Collected Poems, contains all nine of the author's previous poetry books and one previously unpublished book of poems; 428 pages, ISBN 978-1-906570-41-5
- Sean O'Brien, Night Train (with artist Birtley Aris), Flambard Press
- Ruth Padel, Darwin: A Life in Poems, the author is his great-granddaughter
- Christopher Reid, A Scattering (2009 Costa Book Awards book of the year)
- Matthew Welton, We needed coffee but..., 96 pages, Carcanet Press, ISBN 978-1-84777-002-8

==== Anthologies in the United Kingdom ====
- Gerard Carruthers, editor, Scottish Poems
- Fiona Sampson, editor, A Century of Poetry Review, Carcanet Press, ISBN 978-1-84777-016-5

==== Criticism, scholarship and biography in the United Kingdom ====
- Zachary Leader, editor, The Movement Reconsidered: Essays on Larkin, Amis, Gunn, and Their Contemporaries, Oxford University Press (April 2009)
- Contemporary Poetry: Poets and Poetry since 1990 (Cambridge Contexts in Literature) Cambridge University Press, 1st edition ISBN 978-0-521-71248-4

=== United States ===
- Sherman Alexie, Face, the author's first collection in nine years, Hanging Loose Press (April)
- Miguel Algarín, Survival Supervivencia, essays and poems
- Simone dos Anjos, Comedies, Iowa City, Iowa: Cosa Nostra Editions
- Philip Appleman, Karma, Dharma, Pudding & Pie Quantuck Lane Press (April)
- Rae Armantrout, Versed, winner of the National Book Critics Circle Award for Poetry and the 2010 Pulitzer Prize for Poetry; Wesleyan University Press
- Renée Ashley, Basic Heart
- Anny Ballardini, Ghost Dance in 33 Movements Otoliths, ISBN 978-0-9805096-8-7
- Richard Bauch, These Extremes
- David Biespiel, The Book of Men and Women
- Jules Boykoff, Hegemonic Love Potion, Factory School, Brooklyn, New York
- Joel Brouwer, And So, Four Way, ISBN 978-1-884800-91-7
- Louis Cabri, that can’t, Nomados, Vancouver
- Gabrielle Calvocoressi, Apocalyptic Swing (August), Persea
- C. P. Cavafy, translated from the Greek by Daniel Mendelsohn:
  - Collected Poems, Knopf, ISBN 978-0-375-40096-4
  - The Unfinished Poems, C.P. Cavafy, 30 poems, left in various stages of completion by Cavafy when he died in 1933, discovered in the Cavafy Archive in the 1960s by George Savidis, the poet's editor, and published in a scholarly Greek edition by Renata Lavagnini in 1994; Knopf, ISBN 978-0-307-26546-3
- Kelly Cherry, The Retreats of Thought
- Florence Earle Coates (1850–1927), Victi Resurgunt. Published posthumously. A 26-page pamphlet of fifteen "fugitive" patriotic and war poems written by Mrs. Coates. The poems were originally published in various periodicals and texts between the years 1915 and 1922, and have been compiled and organized into pamphlet format. ISBN 978-0-615-30926-2
- Arda Collins, It Is Daylight, Louise Glück's sixth pick as judge of the Yale Series of Younger Poets competition; Yale University Press, ISBN 978-0-300-14888-6 (April)
- Ben Doller, (né Doyle), FAQ, Ahsahta, ISBN 978-1-934103-05-0
- Rita Dove, Sonata Mulattica, Norton, ISBN 978-0-393-07008-8 (April)
- Brett Evans, Slosh Models, Brooklyn: Factory School
- Sarah Gambito, Delivered (Persea), ISBN 978-0892553464
- Peter Ganick, arranger, White Sky Books, Puhos, Finland
- Molly Gaudry, We Take Me Apart: A Novel(la) [in verse], Mud Luscious Press
- Jack Gilbert, The Dance Most of All, Knopf, ISBN 978-0-307-27076-4 (April)
- Jim Harrison, In Search of Small Gods, Copper Canyon Press (April)
- Michael Heller, Eschaton, Jersey City, New Jersey: Talisman House
- Leland Hickman, Tiresias: The Collected Poems of Leland Hickman, edited by Stephen Motika (Preface by Dennis Phillips and Afterwords by Bill Mohr), Nightboat Books
- Ernest Hilbert, Sixty Sonnets, Los Angeles: Red Hen.
- Geoffrey Hill, Selected Poems, Yale University Press, ISBN 978-0-300-12156-8; including "Mercian Hymns"
- Lucy Ives, My Thousand Novel, Iowa City, Iowa: Cosa Nostra Editions
- Stuart Taylor James, Heart Well Worn: The LWAs, 143 pages, PublishAmerica, Baltimore, MD, ISBN 978-1-4489-6438-3
- Marilyn Kallet, Packing Light
- Erica Kaufman, Censory Impulse, Factory School, Brooklyn, New York
- Jesse Lee Kercheval, Cinema Muto
- Burt Kimmelman, As If Free, Talisman, Jersey City, New Jersey
- Natalie Knight, Archipelagos, Punch Press, Buffalo
- Jennifer Kronovet, Awayward, debut book of poetry, selected by Jean Valentine for BOA's A. Poulin Jr. prize; BOA, ISBN 978-1-934414-18-7
- Matthew Landis, Like a Moth From His Death Mouth, privately printed, Philadelphia
- Timothy Liu, Bending the Mind Around the Dream's Blown Fuse, Talisman House, Jersey City, New Jersey
- Lewis MacAdams, Lyrics, Palo Alto, California: Blue Press
- Randall Mann, Breakfast with Thom Gunn, University of Chicago Press, ISBN 978-0-226-50344-8
- Clay Matthews, Runoff, BlazeVOX, Buffalo, New York
- Campbell McGrath, Shannon, about the youngest member of the Lewis and Clark Expedition
- Barry McKinnon, In the Millennium, New Star Books, Vancouver BC / Point Roberts, Washington
- Deborah Meadows, Goodbye Tissues, Shearsman Books, Exeter, UK
- Didi Menendez, For Love of an Armadillo, GOSS 183:: Casa Menendez, Bloomington, Illinois
- Sheila Murphy & mIEKAL aND, How to Spell the Sound of Everything, Xerox Sutra Editions, West Lima, Wisconsin
- Marilyn Nelson – Sweethearts of Rhythm: The Story Of The Greatest All-Girl Swing Band In The World
- Mary Oliver, Evidence, 44 poems, Beacon Press (April)
- Simon Pettet, Hearth, Talisman House, Jersey City, New Jersey
- D. A. Powell, Chronic, Graywolf Press, winner of the 2010 Kingsley Tufts Poetry Award
- Hilda Raz, What Happens
- Kit Robinson, The Messianic Trees: Selected Poems, 1976–2003, Adventures in Poetry, Princeton, New Jersey
- Ce Rosenow, Pacific, Mountain Gate Press, Hillsboro, Oregon
- Frederick Seidel, Poems 1959–2009, Farrar, Straus & Giroux, ISBN 978-0-374-12655-1 (April)
- Mohammad Shaheen, translation from the original Arabic of the late Mahmoud Darwish, Almond Blossoms and Beyond, Interlink (March)
- Frank Sherlock, Over Here, Factory School, Brooklyn, New York
- Louis Simpson, Struggling Times. Rochester, New York: BOA Editions. ISBN 978-1-934414-20-0. This is the Jamaica-born Simpson's 18th collection.
- Logan Ryan Smith, Tracks, Ypolita Press, San Francisco, California
- Elizabeth Swados, The One and Only Human Galaxy, Hanging Loose Press (April)
- Eleanor Ross Taylor, Captive Voices: New and Selected Poems
- Simon Thompson, Why Does It Feel So Late?, New Star Books, Vancouver BC / Point Roberts, Washington
- Sotère Torregian, Envoy, (preface by Andrew Joron), Punch Press, Buffalo, New York
- Pamela Ushuk, Crazy Love
- Fred Wah, The False Laws of Narrative: The Poetry of Fred Wah, selected with an introduction by Louis Cabri; Wilfrid Laurier University Press, Waterloo, Ontario, Canada
- Anne Waldman, Manatee/ Humanity, Penguin, ISBN 978-0-14-311521-2 book-length poem taking its form and concerns from a Tibetan Buddhist ritual and from the poet's close encounter with a Manatee
- Keith Waldrop:
  - Translator from the original French of Charles Baudelaire, Paris Spleen: Little Poems in Prose, Wesleyan University Press (May)
  - Transcendental Studies: A Trilogy, University of California Press, ISBN 978-0-520-25878-5 Waldrop has long been a major force in American avant-garde poetics, and this substantial new volume is big news indeed. Comprising three sequences—each almost a book in itself—plus an epilogue, and received the National Book Award (see below)
- Peter Waterhouse, Language Death Night Outside: Poem / Novel, translated by Rosmarie Waldrop; Burning Deck, Providence, Rhode Island
- Emily Wilson, Micrographia, title from Robert Hooke's 1665 scientific study of the natural world through a microscope; University of Iowa Press, ISBN 978-1-58729-801-1

==== Anthologies in the United States ====
- David Lehman, general editor, David Wagoner, editor, The Best American Poetry 2009 ISBN 978-0-7432-9976-3 (September 2009)
- David Yezzi, editor, Swallow Anthology of New American Poets, (University of Ohio Press, 2009), ISBN 0-8040-1121-4
- Honor Moore, Poems from the Women's Movement (April), work from the 1960s, 1970s and 1980s, Library of America
- Miekal And, editor, "Anthology Spidertangle", representative work of more than 50 visual poets, ISBN 978-1-4382-5818-8, Xexoxial Editions

==== Criticism, scholarship and biography in the United States ====
- International Who's Who in Poetry 2009, Routledge, ISBN 978-1-85743-483-5
- Pierre Joris, Justifying the Margins, Salt Publishing, Cambridge, UK; essays, criticism via poetics
- Joshua Weiner, ed. (2009). At the Barriers: On the Poetry of Thom Gunn. University of Chicago Press. ISBN 978-0-226-89043-2.

==== Poets in The Best American Poetry 2009 ====
These poets appeared in The Best American Poetry 2009, with David Lehman, general editor, and David Wagoner, guest editor (who selected the poetry):

- John Ashbery
- Caleb Barber
- Mark Bibbins
- Bruce Bond
- Marianne Boruch
- Fleda Brown
- Catherine Carter
- Suzanne Cleary
- Billy Collins
- Rob Cook
- James Cummins
- Mark Doty
- Denise Duhamel
- Alice Friman
- Margaret Gibson
- Douglas Goetsch
- Albert Goldbarth
- Barbara Goldberg
- Michael J. Grabell
- Debora Greger
- Jennifer Grotz
- Barbara Hamby
- Sarah Hannah
- Jerry Harp
- Jim Harrison
- Dolores Hayden
- Terrance Hayes
- K. A. Hay
- Bob Hicok
- Daniel Hoffman
- Richard Howard
- P. Hurshell
- Michael Johnson
- Tina Kelley
- Maud Kelly
- Lance Larsen
- Phillis Levin
- Philip Levine
- Sarah Lindsay
- Thomas Lux
- Joanie Mackowski
- Christine Marshall
- Cleopatra Mathis
- J.D. McClatchy
- W. S. Merwin
- Jude Nutter
- Sharon Olds
- Mary Oliver
- Linda Pastan
- Kevin Prufer
- Susan Blackwell Ramsey
- Keith Ratzlaff
- Adrienne Rich
- James Richardson
- Pattiann Rogers
- Gibbons Ruark
- John Rybicki
- Betsy Sholl
- Martha Silano
- Mitch Sisskind
- Tom Sleigh
- Vincent Stanley
- Pamela Sutton
- Alexandra Teague
- Craig Morgan Teicher
- Natasha Trethewey
- Derek Walcott
- Jeanne Murray Walker
- Ronald Wallace
- Charles Harper Webb
- Lisa Williams
- Carolyne Wright
- Debbie Yee
- Kevin Young
- Matthew Zapruder

== Works published in other languages ==
=== French language ===
==== France ====
- Emily Dickinson, Poésies complètes, translated from the original English by Françoise Delphy; Flammarion
- Patrice Delbourg, editor, L'année poétique 2009 ("Poetry Year 2000"), French-language poetry published in the past 12 months, Publisher: Seghers; ISBN 978-2-232-12308-5. an anthology
- Dominique Sorrente, Pays sous les continents, un itinéraire poétique 1978–2008, MLD
- Jean Max Tixier, Chants de l'évidence, publisher: Autres Temps, ISBN 978-2-84521-338-8

==== French poetry in Canada ====
- Normand de Bellefeuille, Mon nom, Publisher: Éditions du Noroît; ISBN 978-2-89018-655-2; a finalist for the Governor General's Awards in French poetry
- René Lapierre, Traité de physique, Publisher: Les Herbes rouges; ISBN 978-2-89419-280-1; a finalist for the Governor General's Awards in French poetry
- Hélène Monette, Thérèse pour joie et orchestre, Publisher: Les Éditions du Boréal; ISBN 978-2-7646-0625-4; a finalist for the Governor General's Awards in French poetry
- Philippe More, Brouillons pour un siècle abstrait, Publisher: Poètes de brousse; ISBN 978-2-923338-20-0; a finalist for the Governor General's Awards in French poetry
- André Roy, Montreal, Les espions de Dieu, Publisher: Les Herbes rouges; ISBN 978-2-89419-282-5; a finalist for the Governor General's Awards in French poetry

==== French poetry in Switzerland ====
- Markus Hediger, En deçà de la lumière, Publisher: Éditions de l'Aire; ISBN 2-88108-886-4

=== German ===
- Christoph Buchwald, series editor, and Uljana Wolf, guest editor, Jahrbuch der Lyrik 2009 ("Yearbook of Poetry 2009"), including poems by Christian Ide Hintze, Herta Müller, Harald Hartung, Marcel Beyer; Frankfurt: Fischer (S.), 254 pages, ISBN 978-3-10-009655-5, an anthology
- Christoph Janacs, Die Zärtlichkeit von Stacheln; Salzburg: Tandem Edition
- Daniel Falb, Bancor, Kookbooks, 64 pages, ISBN 978-3-937445-39-7
- Monika Rinck (author, illustrator) and Andreas Töpfer (illustrator), Helle Verwirrung/Rincks Ding- und Tierleben: Gedichte & Zeichnungen ("Bright confusion/Rinck thing and animal life: Poems & Drawings"), Kookbooks, 200 pages, ISBN 978-3-937445-37-3
- Andre Rudolph (author) and Annette Kühn (illustrator), Fluglärm über den Palästen unsrer Restinnerlichkeit, Luxbooks, 130 pages, ISBN 978-3-939557-90-6
- Uljana Wolf, falsche freunde: Prosa-Gedichte ("false friends: Prose Poems"), Kookbooks, 85 pages, ISBN 978-3-937445-38-0

=== Greece ===
- Phoebe Giannisi, Homerika, publisher: Kedros Editions
- Christoph Janacs, Zärtlichkeit mit Stacheln. Gedichte zu Adalbert Stifter ("The Tenderness of Quills: Poems by Adalbert Stifter"), Salzburg: Edition Tandem, 88 pages, ISBN 978-3-902606-17-4
- Giorgos Lillis, Bounds of the Labyrinth, publisher: Kedros Editions
- Yiannis Stigas, Isopalo Travma ("An Even Wound"), publisher: Kedros Editions
- Noveltly Within or Beyond Language, an anthology of young Greek poets, Athens: Gavriilidis Editions
- Christos Chrysoopoulos (Χρήστος Χρυσόοπουλος), Η άλλη Λώρα ("Another Laura"), criticism; Athens: Kastaniotis

=== India ===
Listed in alphabetical order by first name:

- Bharat Majhi, Dho, Bhubaneswar: Timepass, India, Oriya-language
- K. Siva Reddy, Aame Evaraite Matram, Hyderabad: Palapitta Prachuranalu, Telugu-language
- Pratyush Guleri, editor and translator, Urvar Pradesh, New Delhi: Rajkamal Prakashan, ISBN 978-81-267-1812-2, anthology of poems translated from the original Himachali into Hindi
- S. Joseph, Uppante Kooval Varakkunnu, winner of a Thiruvananthapuram Book Fair award for one of the ten best books of this year; Kottayam: DC Books, ISBN 978-81-264-2447-4; Malayalam-language
- Teji Grover and Rustam Singh, Teji aur Rustam Ki Kavitaen, selected poems of both poets, New Delhi: Harper Collins, ISBN 81-7223-879-7, Hindi-language
- Venkatapu Satyam, translator, Antarjanam, translated into Kannada from the original Telugu of K. Siva Reddy; Bangalore: Kannada Prakashana

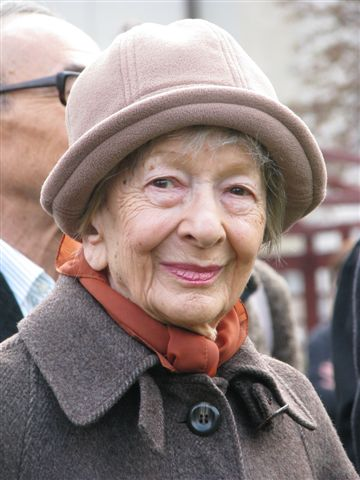
Wisława Szymborska on October 23

=== Poland ===
- Juliusz Erazm Bolek, Sens-or
- Tadeusz Dąbrowski, Czarny kwadrat, winner of the 2009 Koscielski Foundation Prize (popularly known in Poland as the nagrodą Kościelskich, or "Koscielski award") for works by Polish writers under 40 years old
- Jerzy Jarniewicz, Makijaż (Make-up) Wrocław: Biuro Literackie
- Ryszard Krynicki, Wiersze wybrane; Kraków: Wydawnictwo a5
- Piotr Sommer, Rano na ziemi
- Wisława Szymborska, Tutaj ("Here")
- Eugeniusz Tkaczyszyn-Dycki, Rzeczywiste i nierzeczywiste staje się jednym ciałem.111 wierszy
- Adam Zagajewski, Unseen Hand (Niewidzialna ręka), Kraków: Znak

=== Portuguese language ===
- Rosa Lia Dinelle, Enquanto os sinos plangem, poems in many different styles; Brazil
- Carlos Newton Júnior, editor, O cangaço na poesia brasileira, anthology; Brazil
- Arménio Vieira, O poema, a viagem, o sonho, Portugal

=== Russia ===
Books of poetry were published this year by Igor Bulatovsky, Ilya Kucherov, Dmitry Grigoryev, Natalya Chernykh, Aleksey Porvin, Boris Khersonsky, Aleksandr Mironov, Gali-Dana Singer and Vadim Mesyats

=== Other languages ===
- Antonio Gamoneda, Extravío en la luz ("Lost in the light"), Madrid: Casariego, six previously unpublished poems, ISBN 978-84-86760-84-7, Spain
- Jorge Volpi, Oscuro bosque oscuro, novel in free verse, Spanish poetry-language, Mexico
- Rahman Henry, Traansundoree ( A Book of Poems), Bhashachitra, Dhaka, Bangladesh.
- Toyo Shibata – Kujikenaide (″Don't lose heart″), Japan

== Awards and honors ==
Awards announced this year:

=== International ===
- Golden Wreath of Poetry: Tomaž Šalamun (Slovenia)

=== Australia awards and honors ===
- C. J. Dennis Prize for Poetry:
- Kenneth Slessor Prize for Poetry:

=== Canada awards and honors ===
- Lampman-Scott Award: David O'Meara, Noble Gas, Penny Black
- Gerald Lampert Award: Katia Grubisic, what if red ran out
- Griffin Poetry Prize: Canadian: A. F. Moritz, for The Sentinel
  - Others on the shortlist: Kevin Connolly, Revolver; Jeramy Dodds, Crabwise to the Hounds
- Griffin Poetry Prize: International, in the English Language: C.D. Wright, Rising, Falling, Hovering
  - Others on the shortlist: Mick Imlah, The Lost Leader; Derek Mahon, Life on Earth; Dean Young, Primitive Mentor
- Governor General's Award for English language poetry: David Zieroth, The Fly in Autumn
  - Others on the shortlist: David McFadden, Be Calm, Honey, Philip Kevin Paul, Little Hunger; Sina Queyras, Expressway; Carmine Starnino, This Way Out
- Governor General's Award for French language poetry: Hélène Monette, Thérèse pour joie et orchestre
  - Others on the shortlist: Normand de Bellefeuille, Mon nom; René Lapierre, Traité de physique; Philippe More, Brouillons pour un siècle abstrait; André Roy, Les espions de Dieu
- Pat Lowther Award: Alice Major, The Office Tower Tales
- Prix Alain-Grandbois: Monique Deland, Miniatures, balles perdues et autres désordres
- Dorothy Livesay Poetry Prize: Daphne Marlatt, The Given
- Prix Émile-Nelligan: François Turcot, Cette maison n'est pas la mienne

=== India awards and honors ===
- Sahitya Akademi Award : Kailash Vajpayee for Hawa Mein Hastakshar (Hindi)

=== New Zealand awards and honors ===
- Prime Minister's Awards for Literary Achievement (poetry): Brian Turner
- Montana New Zealand Book Awards:
  - Poetry category winner: Jenny Bornholdt, The Rocky Shore
  - NZSA Jessie Mackay Best First Book Award for Poetry: Everything Talks by Sam Sampson (Auckland University Press)

=== United Kingdom awards and honors ===
- Cholmondeley Award: Bernard O'Donoghue, Alice Oswald, Fiona Sampson, Pauline Stainer
- Costa Award (formerly "Whitbread Awards") for poetry:
  - Shortlist:
- David Cohen Prize: Seamus Heaney
- English Association's Fellows' Poetry Prizes:
- Eric Gregory Award (for a collection of poems by a poet under the age of 30): Liz Berry, James Brookes, Swithun Cooper, Alex McRae, Sam Riviere
- Forward Poetry Prize:
  - Best Collection: Don Paterson, Rain
    - Shortlist: Peter Porter; Christopher Reid, A Scattering
  - Best First Collection:
    - Shortlist:
- Jerwood Aldeburgh First Collection Prize for poetry:
  - Shortlist:
- Manchester Poetry Prize:
- Michael Marks Awards for Poetry Pamphlets (first award): Elizabeth Burns, The Shortest Days
- National Poet of Wales:
- National Poetry Competition 2008:
- T. S. Eliot Prize (United Kingdom and Ireland): Jen Hadfield, Nigh-No-Place
  - Shortlist (announced in November 2008):
- The Times/Stephen Spender Prize for Poetry Translation:

=== United States awards and honors ===
- Agnes Lynch Starrett Poetry Prize awarded to Bobby C. Rogers for Paper Anniversary
- AML Award for poetry to Lance Larsen for Backyard Alchemy
- Dwarf Stars Award: Geoffrey A. Landis, "Fireflies"
- Lenore Marshall Poetry Prize: Linda Gregg
- Los Angeles Times Book Prize: Brenda Hillman, Practical Water (Wesleyan University Press)
- National Book Award for Poetry: Keith Waldrop for Transcendental Studies: A Trilogy
- National Book Critics Circle Award for Poetry: Rae Armantrout for Versed
  - Finalists: Louise Glück, A Village Life, D.A. Powell, Chronic, Eleanor Ross Taylor Captive Voices, Rachel Zucker, Museum of Accidents
- The New Criterion Poetry Prize: William Virgil Davis for Landscape and Journey
- O. B. Hardison, Jr. Poetry Prize: Juliana Spahr Judges: Claudia Rankine and Joshua Weiner
- PEN Award for Poetry in Translation: Marilyn Hacker for her translation from the French of King of a Hundred Horsemen by Marie Étienne
- Pulitzer Prize for Poetry (United States): W.S. Merwin for The Shadow of Sirius
  - Finalists: Frank Bidart, Watching the Spring Festival, and Ruth Stone, What Love Comes To: New & Selected Poems
- Randall Jarrell Award in Poetry Criticism: Ange Mlinko
- Rhysling Award:
  - Geoffrey A. Landis, Search (Long Form)
  - Amal El-Mohtar, Songs to an Ancient City (Short Form))
- Ruth Lilly Poetry Prize: Fanny Howe
- Wallace Stevens Award: Louise Glück
- Whiting Awards: Jericho Brown, Jay Hopler, Joan Kane

==== From the Poetry Society of America ====
- Frost Medal: X.J. Kennedy
- Shelley Memorial Award: Ron Padgett and Gary Young; Judges: John Koethe and Christopher Buckley
- Writer Magazine/Emily Dickinson Award: Richard Robbins; Judge: Graham Foust

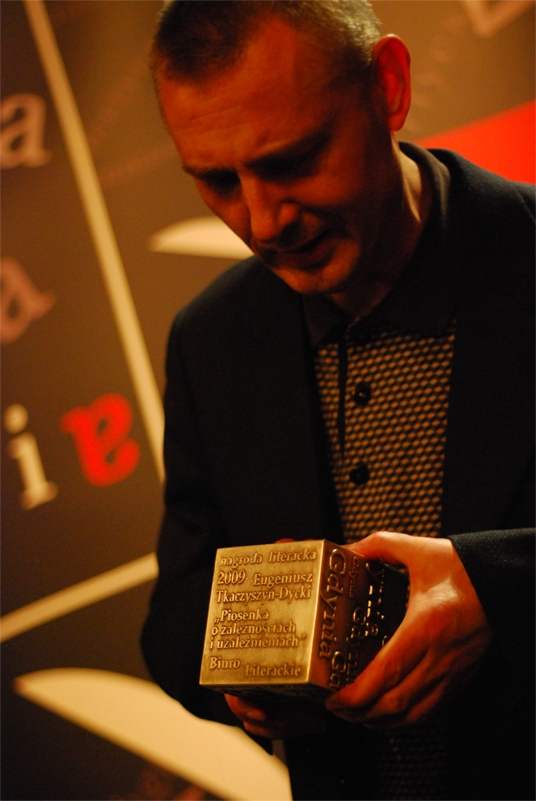
Eugeniusz Tkaczyszyn-Dycki, accepting the Gdynia Literary Prize, for poetry; he also won the Nike Award for best literary work in Poland

- Lyric Poetry Award: Susan Kinsolving; Judge: Lucie Brock-Broido
- Lucille Medwick Memorial Award: Wayne Miller; Judge: Elizabeth Alexander; finalist:
- Alice Fay Di Castagnola Award: Melissa Kwasny; Judge: Ed Roberson; finalists:
- Louise Louis/Emily F. Bourne Student Poetry Award: Grace Dunhame; Judge: Matthew Rohrer; finalists:
- George Bogin Memorial Award: Rusty Morrison; Judge: John Yau
- Robert H. Winner Memorial Award: Eliot Khalil Wilson; Judge: Henri Cole; finalists:
- Cecil Hemley Memorial Award: Melissa Kwasny; Judge: Mei-mei Berssenbrugge
- Norma Farber First Book Award: Richard Deming for Let's Not Call It Consequence; Judge: Martha Ronk
- William Carlos Williams Award: Linda Gregg for All of It Singing; Judge: James Longenbach; finalists:

==== From the Poetry Society of Virginia Student Poetry Contest ====
2009 Student Poetry Contest Winners :: S-3 Category – Grades 5 & 6

- 1st place Eloise H. Kelley, Edgecomb, Maine for the poem "One Unique World"
- 2nd place Eliza D’Anieri, Edgecomb, Maine for the poem "Piano Images"
- 3rd place Cullan Kerner, Winchester, Virginia for the poem "Benched"
- 1st Honorable Mention Graydon Nuk, Edgecomb, Maine for the poem "The Bike"
- 2nd Honorable Mention Josephine Norris Cotton, Edgecomb, Maine for the poem "A Cat's Personality"
- 3rd Honorable Mention Sophia Rose Carbonneau, Edgecomb, Maine for the poem "Florida's Smiles"

2009 Student Poetry Contest Winners :: S-4 Category – Grades 7 & 8

- 1st place Nate Friant, Harbor, Maine for the poem "November Jay"
- 2nd place Ashley Harris, Mt. Kisco, NY for the poem "Lines"
- 3rd place Emma Moorhead, Bath, Maine for the poem "My Crayola"
- 1st Honorable Mention Lia Russell, Richmond, Virginia for the poem "Dogwood"
- 2nd Honorable Mention Amelia Neilson, Arrowsic, Maine for the poem "Harvested"

2009 Student Poetry Contest Winners :: S-5 Category – Grades 9 & 10

- 1st place Cassandra Gergely, Owings, Maryland for the poem "Sun Dreams"
- 2nd place Kelsey Tripp, Roanoke, Virginia for the poem "Clarity"
- 3rd place Aleck Berry, Williamsburg, Virginia for the poem "Golden Fried Love"

2009 Student Poetry Contest Winners :: S-6 Category – Grades 11 & 12

- 1st place Duncan Lyle, Manakin Sabot, Virginia for the poem "Smoking is not allowed in School"
- 2nd place Bianca LaBarbena, Edison, New Jersey for the poem "Haven"
- 3rd place Keenan Nathaniel Thompson, Richmond, Virginia for the poem "Sunflower Angel"
- 1st Honorable Mention Brown Farinholt, Richmond, Virginia for the poem "Your Temple"
- 2nd Honorable Mention Kara Wang, Saratoga, California for the poem "Longing"

2009 Student Poetry Contest Winners :: S-7 Category – Community College

- 1st place Tyler Iseley, Newport News, Virginia for the poem "Warrior"
- 2nd place Linda Arnott, Tucson, Arizona for the poem "The Corpse"

2009 Student Poetry Contest Winners :: S-8 Category – Undergraduate College

- 1st place Nathan W. Friedman, Roanoke, Virginia for the poem "Like Clara Bow"
- 2nd place Nicole Fegeas, Warrenton, Virginia for the poem "Semantics"
- 3rd place Audrey Walls, Richmond, Virginia for the poem "Piedmont Station"

2009 Student Poetry Contest Winners :: Poetry Society Prize

- 1st place Abbie Hinchman, Edgecomb, Maine for the poem "Where My Poems Hide"
- 2nd place Sophia Rose Carbonneau, Edgecomb, Maine for the poem "How to be in a Play"
- 3rd place Maura Eileen Anderson, Edgecomb, Maine for the poem "Late Night Wing: An Alphabet Poem"
- 1st Honorable Mention Daniel Mayer, Walpole, Maine for the poem "My Ascent and Descent"
- 2nd Honorable Mention Jacob Maxmin, Nobleboro, Maine for the poem "Holiday Helpers"
- 3rd Honorable Mention Virginia Hindman, Edgecomb, Maine for the poem "Ignorance"

2009 Student Poetry Contest Winners :: Jenkins Prize

- 1st place Kelsey Tripp, Roanoke, Virginia for the poem "Suppressed Voice"
- 2nd place Mikal Cardine, Warrington, Virginia for the poem "Lost"
- 3rd place Robyn Walters, Yorktown, Virginia for the poem "For the Love of Book"

2009 Student Poetry Contest Winners :: Virginia Student Prize

- 1st place Brown Farinholt, Richmond, Virginia for the poem "Henrietta's"
- 2nd place Mikal Cardine, Warrington, Virginia for the poem "Lonely"
- 3rd place Michelle Moses, Virginia Beach, Virginia for the poem "Novelty Love"
- 1st Honorable Mention Sam Perry, Dillwyn, Virginia for the poem "The Musician"
- 2nd Honorable Mention Philip Halsey, Richmond, Virginia for the poem "Spoiled"
- 3rd Honorable Mention Peter Chiappa, Yorktown, Virginia for the poem "Sonnet 31"

=== Awards and honors elsewhere ===
- Poland:
  - Gdynia Literary Prize, for poetry: Eugeniusz Tkaczyszyn-Dycki, Piosenka o zależnościach i uzależnieniach (2008)
  - Nike Award for literature: Eugeniusz Tkaczyszyn-Dycki, Piosenka o zależnościach i uzależnieniach
- Portuguese: Camões Prize: Arménio Vieira
- Spain: Cervantes Prize: José Emilio Pacheco, Mexico

== Deaths ==
Birth years link to the corresponding "[year] in poetry" article:

- January 2 – Inger Christensen, 73 (born 1935), Danish poet, writer, novelist, essayist and children's book author
- January 4 – Gert Jonke, 62, (born 1946), Austrian poet, novelist playwright and screenwriter, of cancer
- January 10 – Mario Augusto Rodriguez Velez, 92 (born 1917), Panamanian journalist, essayist, dramatist, poet and storyteller, of a heart ailment (surname: Rodriguez Velez)
- January 11 – Milan Rufus, 80 (born 1928), Slovak poet and academic
- January 12 – Mick Imlah, 52 (born 1956), British poet
- January 13 – W. D. Snodgrass, 83 (born 1926), American poet and academic
- January 15 – Maurice Chappaz, 92 (born 1916), Swiss, French-language poet, writer and translator
- January 18 – Grigore Vieru, 73 (born 1935), a Moldovan poet writing in Romanian, strong promoter of the Romanian language in Moldova; died from a car accident
- January 27 – John Updike, 76 (born 1932), American novelist, short story writer, essayist, poet and writer
- January 30 – James Schevill, 88 (born 1920), American poet, critic, playwright and professor at San Francisco State and Brown University
- February 4 – Arnljot Eggen, (born 1923), Norwegian poet, playwright and author of children's books
- February 5 – Subedar Mahmoodmiya Mohammad Imam, popularly known as "Asim Randeri", 104 (born 1904), Indian, Gujarati-language ghazal poet
- February 9:
  - Kazys Bradūnas, 91, Lithuanian poet and editor
  - Don Maclennan, 80 (born 1929), English-born South African poet, critic and academic
- February 13 – Bahtiyar Vahabzade (born 1925), Azerbaijani poet, philologist
- February 20 – Christopher Nolan, 43 (born 1965), Irish poet and author
- February 23 – Peter Wild, 68, (born 1940), American poet and historian, professor at the University of Arizona in Tucson
- February 25 – Bill Holm, 65 (born 1943), American poet, writer and academic, from complications of pneumonia
- March 4 – Triztán Vindtorn (born 1942), Norwegian poet and performance artist
- March 12 – Blanca Varela, 82 (born 1926), Peruvian poet
- March 13 – James Purdy, 94, (born 1914), American novelist, poet and playwright
- March 14 – Gwendoline Konie, 70 (born 1938), Zambian poet and politician
- March 17 – Jane Mayhall, 90, (born 1918), American poet and novelist
- April 3 – Alexei Parshchikov, 54,(born 1954), Russian poet, critic and translator
- April 8 – Henri Meschonnic, 77, (born 1932), French poet, linguist, translator and theoretician
- April 10 – Deborah Digges (born 1950), American poet and academic
- April 12 – Franklin Rosemont (born 1943), American Surrealist poet, labor historian and co-founder of the Chicago Surrealist Group
- April 13 – Stefan Brecht (born 1924), 84, German-born American poet, critic and scholar of theater; son of Bertolt Brecht and Helene Weigel
- April 28 – U. A. Fanthorpe (born 1929), 79, English poet
- April 29, but date uncertain – Craig Arnold (born 1967), 41, American poet, fell climbing a volcano in Japan while collecting material for his next book.
- May 1 –3 – Bantu Mwaura, 40, Kenyan human-rights activist, actor, director, poet and storyteller who wrote poetry in English, Swahili and Gikuyu
- May 7 – Robin Blaser, (born 1925), 83, American-born Canadian poet, Griffin Poetry Prize winner
- May 10 – James Kirkup, 91, English poet, translator and travel writer, from a stroke
- May 17 – Mario Benedetti, 88 (born 1920), Uruguayan, poet, author and journalist
- May 22 – Alexander Mezhirov, 86 (born 1923), Russian poet, translator and critic
- May 26 – Doris Mühringer, 88 (born 1920), Austrian poet, short story writer and children's writer
- May 31 – Kamala Das, 75 (born 1934), Indian short-story writer and poet who wrote in English and Malayalam
- June 3 – David Bromige, 75 (born 1933), English-born Canadian poet who resided in California, winner of the Pushcart Prize.
- June 8:
  - Harold Norse, 92 (born 1916), American poet and memoirist. Considered among Beat poets.
  - Habib Tanvir, 85 (born 1923), popular Hindi playwright, theatre director, poet and actor
- June 24 – Steven Wells, 49 (born 1960), English music critic, journalist, screenwriter, poet, novelist, film producer and publisher
- June 25 – Michael Jackson, 50 (born 1958), American pop singer, songwriter, poet and author
- July 3 – Alauddin Al-Azad, 77 (born 1932), Bengali novelist, writer, poet, literary critic and academic
- August 6 – Wahyu Sulaiman Rendra, born Willibrordus Surendra Broto Rendra, popularly known as W. S. Rendra and also known as "Si Burung Merak" and "The Peacock", 74 (born 1935), Indonesian poet
- August 8 – Alfonso Calderón, 78 (born 1930), Chilean poet, writer, memoirist and poetry anthologist
- August 16 – Alistair Campbell, 84 (born 1925), New Zealand poet, writer and editor, and once the husband of fellow poet Fleur Adcock
- August 19:
  - Dic Jones, 75, Welsh poet
  - Lina Kasdagli (also spelled "Lina Kasdaglē"), 88 (born 1912), Greek poet and translator
- August 27 – Sergey Mikhalkov, 96 (born 1913), Russian writer and poet, co-author of the lyrics of the National Anthem of the Soviet Union and National Anthem of Russia
- September 3 – Christine D'Haen, 85, Belgian poet
- September 11:
  - Sarane Alexandrian, 82, French art historian, philosopher and poet
  - Jim Carroll, 59 (born 1949), American poet, author and musician.
- September 15 – Wayne Brown, 65 (born 1944), Trinidadian writer and poet
- September 27 – Gaya Prasad Tiwari, 89, Hindi poet in India and twice winner of the Hindi Sahitya Akademi Award, died after being hit by a train as he was crossing the tracks (hard of hearing, he apparently did not hear the train coming)
- September 30 – Rafael Arozarena, 86, Spanish writer and poet.
- October 1 – Cintio Vitier, 88, Cuban
- October 18 – Lenore Kandel, 77, American, died of lung cancer
- November 1 – Alda Merini, 78, Italian.
- November 15 – Anna Mendelssohn, 61, British poet and political activist, brain tumour
- December 10 – Dilip Chitre, 71 (born 1938), Indian writer who wrote in Marathi and English. He was also a painter and filmmaker. His Ekun Kavita or Collected Poems were published in the 1990s. His most famous translation is of the celebrated 17th century Marathi bhakti poet Tukaram.
- December 20 – Vera Rich, 73 (born 1936), British poet, journalist, historian, and translator
- December 24 – Jim Chastain, 46 (born 1963), American poet,
- December 24/25? – Rachel Wetzsteon, 42 (born 1967), American poet, poetry editor of The New Republic at the time of her death, from suicide
- December 26 – Dennis Brutus, 85 (born 1924), South African poet and anti-Apartheid activist. He was imprisoned and incarcerated in the cell next to Nelson Mandela's on Robben Island from 1963 to 1965.
- December 30 –Ruth Lilly, 94, American philanthropist (Eli Lilly and Company), established $100,000 Ruth Lilly Poetry Prize and donated $200 million to Poetry magazine

== See also ==
- Poetry
- List of poetry awards

== Notes ==
- Britannica Book of the Year 2010 (events of 2009), published by the Encyclopædia Britannica, online edition (subscription required), "Literature/Year in Review 2009" section
