= 1920 in poetry =

If you could hear, at every jolt, the blood

Come gargling from the froth-corrupted lungs,
Obscene as cancer, bitter as the cud
Of vile, incurable sores on innocent tongues,–
My friend, you would not tell with such high zest
To children ardent for some desperate glory,
The old Lie: Dulce et decorum est

Pro patria mori.

— Wilfred Owen, concluding lines of "Dulce et Decorum est", written 1917, published posthumously this year

Nationality words link to articles with information on the nation's poetry or literature (for instance, Irish or France).

Fire and Ice
by Robert Frost
Some say the world will end in fire,
Some say in ice.
From what I've tasted of desire
I hold with those who favor fire.
But if it had to perish twice,
I think I know enough of hate
To know that for destruction ice
Is also great
And would suffice.
--first published in December in Harper's Magazine

== Events ==
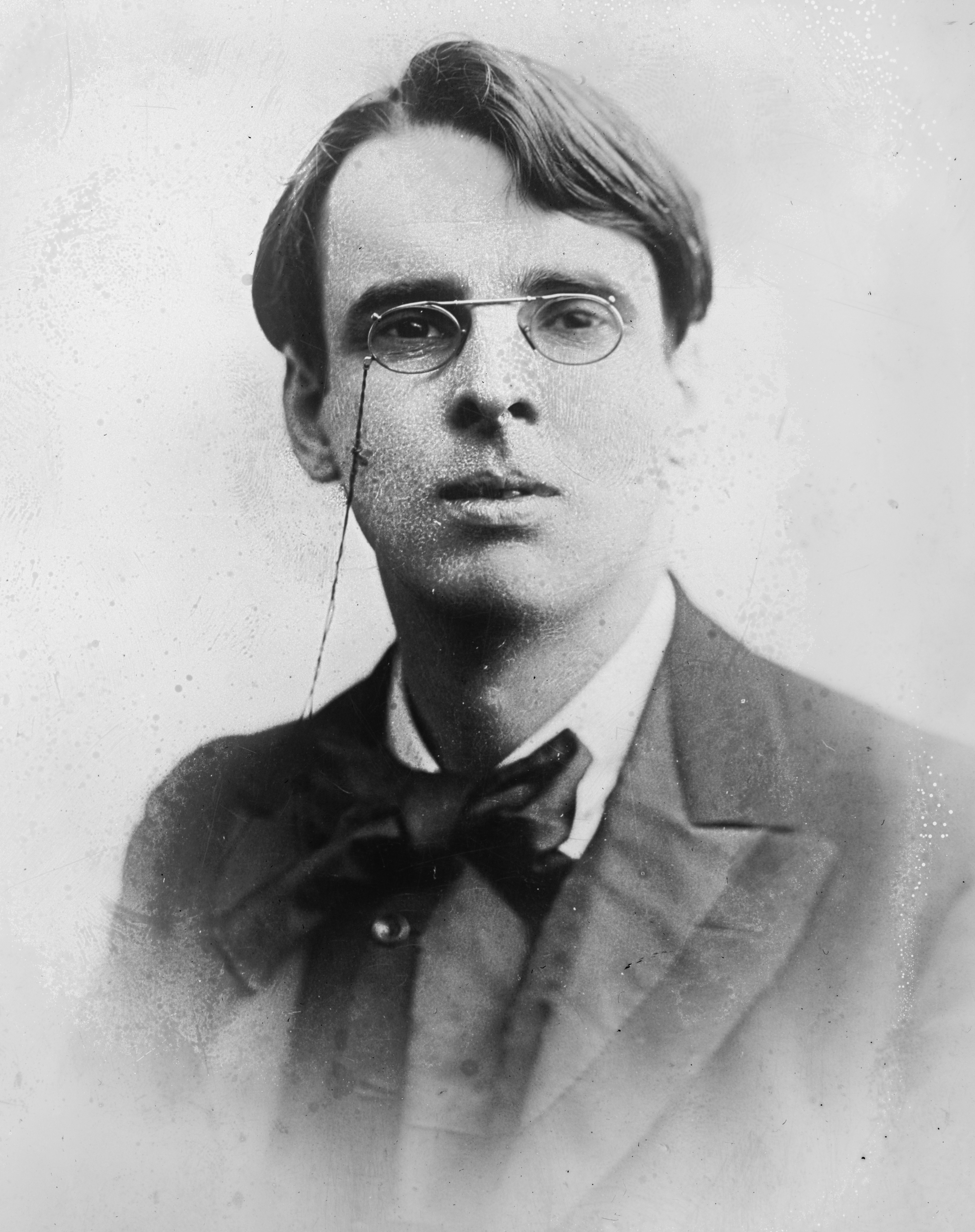
Photograph of William Butler Yeats taken this year

- May – Irish poet W. B. Yeats concludes a lecture tour (begun in the fall of 1919) in the United States and crosses the Atlantic to settle in Oxford.
- December – The Poems of English war poet Wilfred Owen (killed in action 1918) are published posthumously in London with an introduction by his friend Siegfried Sassoon; only five of Owen's verses had been published during his lifetime, thus his work is introduced to many readers for the first time, including the 1917 poems "Anthem for Doomed Youth" and "Dulce et Decorum est"; the latter 28-line poem's horrifying imagery makes it one of the best-known condemnations of war ever written.
- Ezra Pound moves from London to Paris where he moves among a circle of artists, musicians and writers who are revolutionising modern art.
- The Dial, a longstanding American literary magazine, is re-established by Scofield Thayer; the publication becomes an important outlet for Modernist poets and writers (until 1929), with contributors this year including Sherwood Anderson, Djuna Barnes, Kenneth Burke, Hart Crane, E. E. Cummings, Charles Demuth, Kahlil Gibran, Gaston Lachaise, Amy Lowell, Marianne Moore, Ezra Pound, Odilon Redon, Bertrand Russell, Carl Sandburg, Van Wyck Brooks, and W. B. Yeats.
- First issue of the anthology of Scottish poetry, Northern Notes, edited by Christopher Murray Grieve.
- Russian poet Nikolay Gumilyov co-founds the "All-Russia Union of Writers" in the Soviet Union, where he makes no secret of his anti-Communist views, crosses himself in public, and doesn't care to hide his contempt for half-literate Bolsheviks. His fate changes in 1921.

== Works published in English ==
=== Australia ===
- Martin Boyd, Retrospect: Poems
- James Hebblethwaite, The Poems of James Hebblethwaite
- Henry Kendall, The Poems of Henry Kendall
- Vance Palmer, "The Farmer Remembers the Somme"

=== United Kingdom ===
- Maurice Baring, Poems 1914–1919
- Edmund Blunden, The Waggoner and Other Poems
- Robert Bridges, October, and Other Poems
- Cambridge Poets 1914–1920, anthology edited by Edward Davison
- W. H. Davies, The Song of Life, and Other Poems
- Walter de la Mare, Poems 1901 to 1918
- T. S. Eliot:
  - Poems, including Gerontion (text) and Sweeney Among the Nightingales
  - The Sacred Wood: Essays on Poetry and Criticism
- Robert Graves, Country Sentiment
- Aldous Huxley, Leda
- India in Song: Eastern Themes in English Verse by British and Indian Poets, an anthology of Indian poetry in English published in the UK (London: Oxford)
- John Masefield, Enslaved, and Other Poems
- Hope Mirrlees, Paris: A Poem (Hogarth Press, 1st edition misdated 1919)
- Harold Monro, Some Contemporary Poets (1920), criticism
- Wilfred Owen, Poems, introduction by Siegfried Sassoon (posthumous)
- Ruth Pitter, First Poems
- Ezra Pound, American poet published in the United Kingdom:
  - Hugh Selwyn Mauberley, London
  - Umbra, London
- Nina Salaman, The Voices of the Rivers
- Siegfried Sassoon, Picture Show
- Edward Thomas, Collected Poems, foreword by Walter de la Mare
- Iris Tree, Poems
- Valour and Vision: Poems of the War, 1914-1918, anthology edited by Jacqueline T. Trotter
- Charles Williams, Divorce
- Humbert Wolfe:
  - London Sonnets
  - Shylock Reasons with Mr. Chesterton, and Other Poems
- W. B. Yeats, Irish poet published in the United Kingdom, "The Second Coming" first published in The Dial magazine for November (published again in 1921 in Yeats' Michael Robartes and the Dancer)

=== United States ===
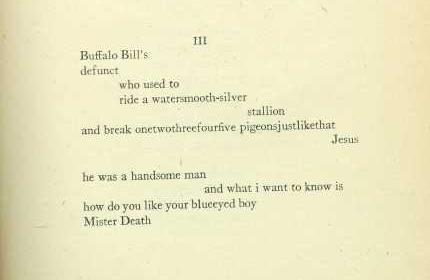
E.E. Cummings' unusual style can be seen in his poem "Buffalo Bill's/ defunct" from the January 1920 issue use of Dust

- Stephen Vincent Benét, Heavens and Earth
- Witter Bynner, A Canticle of Pan
- Hart Crane, "My Grandmother's Love Letters" in The Dial, his first real step towards recognition as a poet
- W.E.B. Du Bois, Darkwater
- Robert Frost, Miscellaneous Poems
- William Ellery Leonard, The Lynching Bee
- Edgar Lee Masters, Domesday Book
- Edna St. Vincent Millay, A Few Figs From Thistles
- Ezra Pound, American poet published in the United Kingdom:
  - Hugh Selwyn Mauberley, London
  - Umbra, London
- Lizette Woodworth Reese, Spicewood
- Charles Reznikoff, Poems published by the New York Poetry Book Shop; the book features poems from Reznikoff's Rhythms and Rhythms II
From Betty
by Lola Ridge
My doll Janie has no waist
and her body is like a tub with feet on it.
Sometimes I beat her
but I always kiss her afterwards.
When I have kissed all the paint off her body
I shall tie a ribbon about it
so she shan't look shabby.
But it must be blue--
it mustn't be pink--
pink shows the dirt on her face
that won't wash off.
- Lola Ridge, Sun-Up, including "Betty"
- Edward Arlington Robinson:
  - Lancelot
  - The Three Taverns
- Carl Sandburg, Smoke and Steel
- Sara Teasdale, Flame and Shadow, including" There Will Come Soft Rains"
- Galway Wescott, The Bitterns
- William Carlos Williams, Kora in Hell. Improvisations

=== Other in English ===
- India in Song: Eastern Themes in English Verse by British and Indian Poets, London: Oxford; anthology; Indian poetry in English, published in the United Kingdom
- Yone Noguchi, Japanese Hokkus, Japanese poet writing in English
- Maneck B. Pithawalla, Sacred Sparks, Karachi: M. B. Pithawalla
- Tom Redcam, San Gloria, verse play, Jamaica
- W. B. Yeats, Irish poet published in the United Kingdom, The Second Coming first published in the November issue of The Dial magazine (see quotation, above; published again in Michael Robartes and the Dancer 1921)

== Works published in other languages ==
=== France ===
- Louis Aragon, Feu de joie
- Natalie Clifford Barney, American resident and published in France, Poems & Poemes: Autres Alliances (bilingual English and French)
- Jean Cocteau, Poésies 1917–1920
- Philippe Soupault, Rose des vents
- Tristan Tzara, pen name of Sami Rosenstock, Cinéma calendrier coeur abstrait maisons
- Charles Vildrac, Chants du désespéré

=== Indian subcontinent ===
Including all of the British colonies that later became India, Pakistan, Bangladesh, Sri Lanka and Nepal. Listed alphabetically by first name, regardless of surname:

==== Telugu poetry ====
- Garimella Satyanarayana, Makoddi tella doratanamu, a Telugu-language song famously used by Indians marching for freedom; the very militant lyric was banned for a time by the colonial government, which arrested the poet
- Rami Reddi also known as "Duvvuri":
  - Jaladangana, celebrates farming season and the beauty of nature in the rural countryside, Indian, Telugu-language
  - Venakumari, Telugu-language pastoral poems depicting the struggles of peasants

==== Other Indian languages ====
- Ananda Chandra Agarwala, Jilikani, Assamese-language poem reflecting ancient Assamese ballads
- Bhaskar Ramchandra Tambe, Tambe Yanci Kavita, Marathi-language poems; edited by V. G. Mayadev
- Chanda Jha, Mahes Vani Sanghra, Maithili-language devotional songs addressed to Lord Siva
- Dharanidhar Sharma Koirala, Naibedya, Nepali-language poetry, didactic poems popular in Darjeeling
- Lala Kirpa Sagar, Laksmi Devi, Punjabi-language, long, narrative epic poem modeled on Sir Walter Scott's The Lady of the Lake; depicts Maharaja Ranjit Singh's battles with Jaimal Singh, a hill chieftain
- Pt. Ram Naresh Tripathi, Pathik, very popular Hindi-language Khanda Kavya which went into 30 editions; patriotic and expressing love of the rural countryside; strongly influenced by Gandhi's thought
- Surendra Jha 'Suman', also known as "Suman", Candi Carya, adaptation of Durgasaptasati in verse, Maithili-language
- Vaijanath Kashinath Rajwade, Kesavasutanci Kavita, Marathi-language article offering the first thematic classification and detailed analysis of Keshavsut's poems, criticism published in the monthly Manoranjan in July, September, October and November

=== Spanish language ===
- Enrique Bustamante y Ballivián, Poemas autóctonos, Peru
- León Felipe, Veersos y oraciones del caminante ("Verses and Prayers of the Walker"), first volume (second volume, 1930), Spain
- Alfonsina Storni, Langour, Argentina
- Miguel de Unamuno, El Christo de Velázquez ("Christ by Velázquez"), Spain

=== Other languages ===
- Piaras Béaslaí, "Bealtaine 1916" agus Dánta Eile, Ireland
- António Botto, Canções do Sul ("Songs of the South"), Portugal
- Ernst Enno, Valge öö, Estonia
- Kahlil Gibran, Al-'Awāsif ("The Tempests") and Spirits Rebellious (English translation), Lebanese-born Arabic poet in the United States
- Vladislav Khodasevich, The Way of Corn, Russia
- Tom Kristensen, Pirate Dreams, Denmark
- Jan Lechon, The Scarlet Poem, Poland
- Boleslaw Lesmian, The Meadow, Poland
- Eugenio Montale, Ossi di seppia ("Cuttlefish bones"), Italy
- Les Poètes contre la guerre, France
- Anton Schnack, Tier rang gewaltig mit Tier ("Beast strove mightily with beast"), Germany
- Edith Sodergran, The Shadow of the Future, Sweden
- Georg Trakl, Der Herbst des Einsamen ("The Autumn of The Lonely"), Austrian native published in Germany
- Pavlo Tychyna, Instead of Sonnets or Octaves, Ukraine
- Tin Ujević, Lelek sebra ("Cry of a slave"), Croatian
- Henrik Visnapuu, Talihari, Hõbedased kuljused and Käoorvik, Estonia

== Births ==
Death years link to the corresponding "[year] in poetry" article:

- January 24 – Keith Douglas (killed in action 1944), English poet
- February 21 – Ishigaki Rin 石垣りん (died 2004), Japanese poet; she was an employee of the Industrial Bank of Japan, sometimes called "the bank teller poet"
- February 23 – David Wright (died 1994), South African-born English poet
- February 29 – Howard Nemerov (died 1991), American poet, United States Poet Laureate from 1963 to 1964 and from 1988 to 1990
- March 5 – Madhunapantula Satyanarayana Sastry (died 1992), Indian, Telugu-language poet (surname: Satyanarayanashastri)
- March 11 – D. J. Enright (died 2002), English academic, poet, novelist and critic
- March 24 – Balachandra Rajan (died 2009), Indian critic, novelist and writer of Indian poetry in English
- April 27 – Edwin Morgan (died 2010), Scottish poet and translator
- June 13 – Ruth Guimarães (died 2014), Afro-Brazilian classicist, fiction writer and poet
- June 15 – Amy Clampitt (died 1994), American poet and author
- June 18 – Rosemary Dobson (died 2012), Australian poet
- July 18 – Zheng Min (died 2022), Chinese poet
- August 16 – Charles Bukowski (died 1994), American poet, novelist and short-story writer
- August 18 – Harbhajan Singh (died 2002), Indian, Punjabi poet in the Sahajvadi tradition, also a critic, cultural commentator and translator
- September 6 – Barbara Guest née Barbara Ann Pinson (died 2006), American poet and critic
- September 18 – Doris Mühringer (died 2009), Austrian poet, short-story writer and children's writer
- October 24 – Robert Greacen (died 2008), Irish poet
- November 3 – Oodgeroo Noonuccal (died 1993), Australian poet, actress, writer, teacher, artist and campaigner for Aboriginal causes
- November 23 – Paul Celan (suicide 1970), German-language poet born to a German-speaking Jewish family in a place at this time part of Romania (part of modern-day Ukraine)
- November 28 – Alexander Scott (died 1989), Scottish poet and literary scholar
- Also:
  - V. A. Anandakkuttan (died 1969), Indian, Malayalam-language poet and author of humorous essays and farces
  - Bernardino Evaristo Mendes, also known as B. E. Mendes, Indian, Konkani-language poet known for philosophical and theosophical writing
  - Birendra Chattopadhyay (died 1985), Bengali-language poet and Marxist
  - Jayant Pathak, Indian, Gujarati-language poet and critic
  - K. B. Nikumb, Indian, Marathi-language poet
  - Manmohan Misra, Indian poet and essayist in Orissa
  - Natvarlal Kuberdas Pandya (pen name, "Usanas"), Indian, Gujarati-language poet and critic
  - Okiyuma Gwaynn, Indian poet writing Indian poetry in English and then in Nepali; born in Hong Kong to a Japanese father and Tibetan mother, he settles in Darjeeling in 1946
  - Ram Lal Papiha, Indian, Dogri-language poet
  - Rentala Gopalakrishna, Indian, Telugu-language poet and playwright
  - Santokh Singh Dheer, Indian, Punjabi poet and fiction writer in the largely romantic and progressive-in-outlook Amrita-Mohan Singh tradition of Punjabi
  - Tulasibahadur Chetri, nicknamed "Apatan", Indian, Nepali-language poet and playwright

== Deaths ==
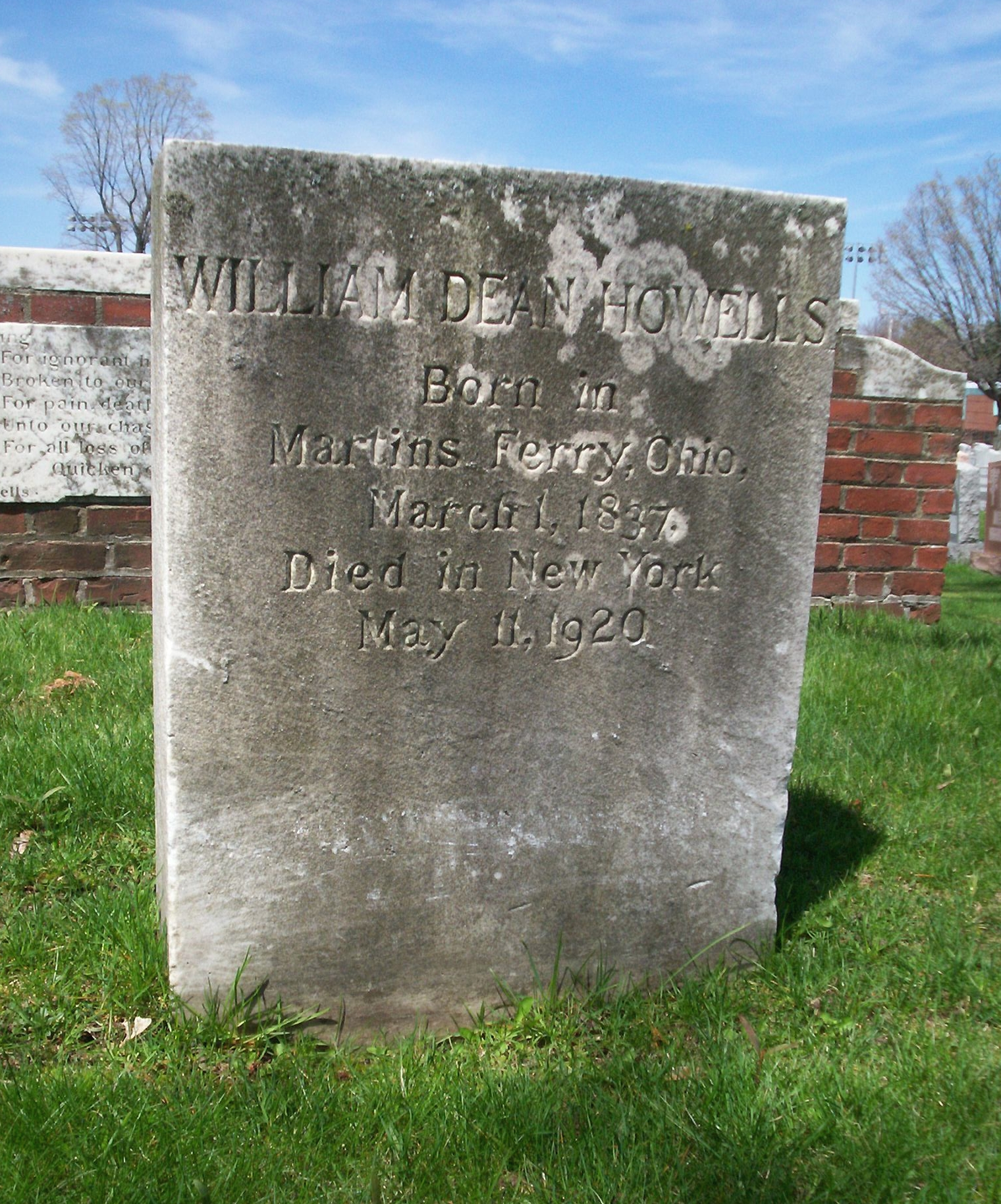
Grave of William Dean Howells, buried in Cambridge, Massachusetts

Birth years link to the corresponding "[year] in poetry" article:

- February 7 – Dollie Radford, 61, English poet and writer
- February 8 – Richard Dehmel, 56, German poet
- February 19 – Ernest Hartley Coleridge (born 1846), English scholar and poet, grandson of Samuel Taylor Coleridge
- May 11 – William Dean Howells, 83, American literary critic, author and poet
- June 5 – Julia A. Moore, the "Sweet Singer of Michigan", 72, American poetaster, famed for her notoriously bad poetry
- July 3 – Charles E. Carryl, 78, American children's poet
- September 16 – Dan Andersson, 32, Swedish poet, accidentally poisoned
- October 25 – Terence MacSwiney, 41, Irish playwright, poet and politician, hunger strike
- November 2 – Louise Imogen Guiney, 59, American-born poet
- November 18 – Matthías Jochumsson, 85, Icelandic lyric poet, playwright, translator and pastor
- December 5 – T. W. Rolleston, 63, Irish-born writer, poet and translator
- December 21 – Mohammed Abdullah Hassan, 56, Somali poet, religious and nationalist leader who for 20 years led armed resistance to the British, Italian, and Ethiopian forces in Somalia and used his patriotic poetry to rally his supporters
- December 24 – Matilda Maranda Crawford, 76, American-Canadian poet, writer, correspondent
- Also:
  - Devendranath Sen (born 1855), Indian, Bengali-language poet
  - Divakarla Tirupti Shastri (born 1872), Indian, Telugu-language poet; one of the two poets known in Telugu literature as "Triupati Vankata Kavulu"
  - Eknath Pandurang Randalkar (born 1887), Indian, Marathi-language poet and translator from Sanskrit, English, Bengali and Gujarati poetry
  - Jammuneshwar Khataniyar (born 1899), Indian, Assamese-language poet; a woman
  - Mian Hidayatulla (birth year not known), Indian, Punjabi-language poet
  - Nagesh Vishwanath Pai, also spelled "Nagesh Vishvanath Pai" (born 1860), Indian, Marathi-language poet and fiction writer
  - Vishvanatha Dev Varma (born 1850), Indian, Sanskrit-language poet

== See also ==
- Poetry
- List of years in poetry
