= Victorian Studies =

- Discipline: Humanities
- Language: English
- Edited by: Lara Kriegel, Ivan Kreilkamp, D. Rae Greiner, Monique Morgan

Publication details
- History: 1956–present
- Publisher: Indiana University Press
- Frequency: Quarterly

Standard abbreviations
- ISO 4: Vic. Stud.

Indexing
- ISSN: 0042-5222 (print); 1527-2052 (web)
- LCCN: a58005527
- JSTOR: 00425222
- OCLC no.: 1769095

Links
- Journal homepage; Online access at Project MUSE

Victorian Studies is a quarterly peer-reviewed academic journal published by Indiana University Press. It covers research on nineteenth-century Britain during the reign of Queen Victoria (1837–1901) and publishes essays, forums, and reviews on a variety of topics concerning Victorianism, including literature, social and political history, philosophy, fine arts, science, economics, and law. It is the official journal of the North American Victorian Studies Association.

Victorian Studies was established in 1956 at Indiana University by Philip Appleman, William A. Madden, and Michael Wolff. The journal is hosted by the university's Victorian Studies Program, in conjunction with the English department. The current editors-in-chief are Ivan Kreilkamp, Rae Greiner, Monique Morgan, and Lara Kriegel.

Recent issues of the journal have focused on a variety of topics, ranging from science, including "Darwin and the Evolution of Victorian Studies", to the more subjective sphere of "Victorian Emotions".

== Abstracting and indexing ==
The journal is abstracted and indexed in MLA Bibliography, Arts and Humanities Citation Index, Current Contents/Arts & Humanities, Social Sciences Citation Index, ProQuest, and EBSCO databases.
