= Appleman =

Appleman is a surname. Notable people with the surname include:

- Hale Appleman (born 1986), American actor
- Mickey Appleman (born 1945), American poker player
- Philip Appleman (1926–2020), American poet
- William Appleman Williams (1921–1990), American historian

== Other uses ==
- An evil character in Bananaman
- A colloquial name of the Mandelbrot set
