= Chris Hutchinson =

Chris Hutchinson may refer to:

- Chris Hutchinson (American football), American football defensive tackle
- Chris Hutchinson (poet) (born 1972), Montreal, Canada
