= Dennis Phillips (poet) =

American poet

Dennis Phillips (born 1951) is a U.S. poet & novelist. He is the author of A World (1989), Arena (1991), Book of Hours (1996), Credence (1996), and Sand (2002), among other works of poetry, as well as the novel Hope (2007). He co-edited the poetry-section of the New Review of Literature, was a founding editor of Littoral Books, the first Book Review Editor of the magazine Sulfur and the L.A. Weekly's first poetry-editor, as well as a director of the Beyond Baroque Literary Arts Center.

Phillips attended the California Institute of the Arts, where he studied with Clayton Eshleman. He then attended graduate school at New York University. He is a professor in the Humanities and Science Department at Art Center College of Design in Pasadena, the city where he lives with his wife, artist Courtney Gregg, and their daughter.

== Selected bibliography ==
- The Hero Is Nothing, Kajun Press, San Francisco (1985)
- A World, Sun and Moon Press, Los Angeles (1989)
- Arena, Sun and Moon Press, Los Angeles (1991)
- Means, Parenthesis Writing Series, San Diego (1991)
- 20 Questions, Jahbone Press, Los Angeles (1991)
- Book of Hours, ML NLF, Piacenza, Italy (1996)
- Credence, Sun and Moon Press, Los Angeles (1996)
- Study for the Ideal City, Seeing Eye Books. Los Angeles (1999)
- Sand, Green Integer, Los Angeles (2002)
- Hope, (A Novel) Green Integer, Los Angeles (2007)
- "Preface" (by Dennis Phillips), Tiresias: The Collected Poems of Leland Hickman, edited by Stephen Motika (Afterword by Bill Mohr), Nightboat Books, 2009.
- "Study for the Possibilities of Hope," Pie in the Sky Press, Los Angeles (2010)
- "Navigation: Selected poems 1985 - 2010," Seismicity Editions. (Afterword by George Albon.) Los Angeles (2011)
- "Sophia's Lament," Ninja Press, Los Angeles (2012)
- "Measures," Talisman House Publishers, Greenfield, MA (2013)
- "Mappa Mundi," Talisman House Publishers, Greenfield, MA (2019)
