= William Virgil Davis =

American poet (born 1940)

- Born: 1940 (age 85–86); Ohio, U.S.
- Education: Ohio University
- Occupation: Poet

William Virgil Davis (born 1940) is an American poet.

He has published poems in Poetry, The Nation, The Hudson Review, The Georgia Review, The Hopkins Review, The Gettysburg Review, The New Criterion, The Sewanee Review, The Atlantic Monthly, Denver Quarterly, and Shenandoah, among others. He has also published several books of literary criticism, as well as critical essays in numerous periodicals. He is Professor of English and Writer-in-Residence at Baylor University.

== Biography ==
William Virgil Davis was born in the United States of America in 1940, in Ohio. He studied at Ohio University. He has lived and taught in Austria, Denmark and Wales for extended periods of time.

== Awards ==
- 1979 Yale Series of Younger Poets Prize
- 1984 Calliope Press Chapbook Prize
- 2009 New Criterion Poetry Prize
- 2010 Helen C. Smith Memorial Award for Poetry

== Bibliography ==
=== Poetry ===
Collections

- Dismantlements of Silence : Poems Selected and New (2015)
- The Dark Hours, which won the Calliope Press Chapbook Prize
- Winter Light
- One Way to Reconstruct The Scene. Yale University Press. 1980. ISBN 978-0-300-02503-3.
- Landscape and Journey
- The Bones Poems

List of poems

Title	Year	First published	Reprinted/collected
The gardens of the Villa D'Este	2023	Davis, William Virgil (February 2023). "The gardens of the Villa D'Este". Commonweal. 150 (2): 59.	

- BITTERROOT: INTERNATIONAL POETRY QUARTERLY TENTH ANNIVERSARY, Menke Katz (editor-in-chief), VOLUME X NUMBER 4 ISSUE 40, SUMMER 1972
- The Ohio Poem, Hudson Review, Spring 1982, Vol. 35 Issue 1, p69-70, 2p
- Artful Dodge, Issue 26/27 (1994)
- THE BRIDGE: A JOURNAL OF FICTION & POETRY VOLUME, Jack Zucker (editor), 6 NUMBER 2 FALL / WINTER 1997
- FOUR QUARTERS, John J. Keenan(editor), VOLUME 8, NUMBER 2, SECOND SERIES FALL, 1994
- A visit to Manafon, The New Criterion, April 1997
- Deserter; A Corpse in Gloves; Tracks, The Courtland Review, Issue Four, August 1998
- Courtyard looking toward Artemis from the west cloister, The New Criterion, December 2001
- SPECIAL ISSUE: POETRY TOUR GUIDE U.S. 62, Pudding 44, Summer 2002, 54 pages
- The Staying, Leaves, and The Singing,, The Gettsburg Review, Autumn Spring 2002
- The Other, AGNI 59, 2004
- A Vision in Late Afternoon, The Gettsburg Review, Autumn 2005
- Morning; Seasons; Sentinel, Webber The Contemporary West, Spring/Summer 2006, Volume 22.3
- Photographs; Weather Report; The Writer, Webber The Contemporary West, Fall 2008, Volume 25.1

=== Criticism ===
- William Virgil Davis (January 1, 1992). Critical Essays on Robert Bly. Twayne Publishers. ISBN 978-0-87249-591-3.
- William Virgil Davis (1993). Miraculous Simplicity. University of Arkansas Press. ISBN 978-1-55728-265-1.
- William Virgil Davis (2007). R.S. Thomas. Baylor University Press. ISBN 978-1-932792-49-2.
- George Whitefield's Journals, 1737–1741, Scholar's Facsimiles & Reprints,1969. Editor
- Understanding Robert Bly, University of South Carolina Press, 1988.
- Robert Bly: The Poet and His Critics, Camden House Publishers, 1994.

== Anthologies ==
- Naomi Shihab Nye; Paul B. Janeczko, eds. (1999). I Feel a Little Jumpy Around You. Simon and Schuster. ISBN 978-0-689-81341-2.
- Ray González, ed. (1996). Inheritance of light. University of North Texas Press. ISBN 978-1-57441-013-6.
- Nancy C. McAlister; Robert Waters Grey, eds. (1976). WHITE TRASH: An Anthology of Contemporary Southern Poets.
