= Zheng Min =

Chinese scholar and poet (1920–2022)

Zheng Min (Chinese: 郑敏) (18 July 1920 – 3 January 2022) was a Chinese scholar and modernist poet.

== Early life and career ==
Zheng Min was born on 18 July 1920 in Minhou County, China. She attended the Southwestern University of Kunming, where she graduated with a Bachelor's degree in philosophy in 1943. She first began publishing work during The War of Resistance, one of few female modernist poets doing so at the time. Zheng attended Brown University in the United States and earned her Master's in literature in 1951, before returning to China in 1955. She is one of nine prolific modernist poets considered to be in the "Nine Leaves" school of poetry. While Zheng's work is by and large not considered to be feminist in nature, her position as a female poet in a largely male dominated area, her deviation from expected, traditional female writing, and her explorations of the female psyche in particular still leave her as an important figure in Chinese poetry.

== Style ==
Zheng Min's early works are characterized by their lyricism, philosophy, and social realism. She is praised for her ability to combine all three, especially for her lyrical writing, and for her ability to create emotional depth. Zheng is also commended for blending traditionally masculine and feminine poetry styles, the latter being exemplified by her lyricism and the former by her philosophical influences and explorations of other typically masculine themes. Zheng's style is full of imagery and metaphor, and makes great use of her own sensory perception, but is also, in her own terms, "rooted firmly in sensibility." In this way, her poems are often introspective and profound, and Zheng shows a clear interest in exploring the mind through her works. Zheng's style has also earned her critics as well, however, as it is prone to cause some of her more extensive poems to feel disjointed and as though they lack a clear, unifying idea.

Though a modernist poet, Zheng is credited with combining both modernist and traditional techniques in her work. While often employing the modernist tool of split ego, she also often wrote with longing and lament, particularly in her love poems, which are indicative of more traditional literary works. Unlike many later female poets, her works are not viewed as particularly feminist in nature. Rather, critics in the younger generation see them as fitting into the already existing patriarchal mold.

== Personal life and death ==
Zheng died in Beijing on 3 January 2022, at the age of 101.

== Selected works ==
- Zheng Min Shiji 1942-1947 [The Collected Poems of Zheng Min 1942-1947]
- Jiuye ji [The Collected Poems of the Nine Leaves]
