= Borys Khersonskyi =

Ukrainian clinical psychologist (born 1950)

- Борис Херсонський
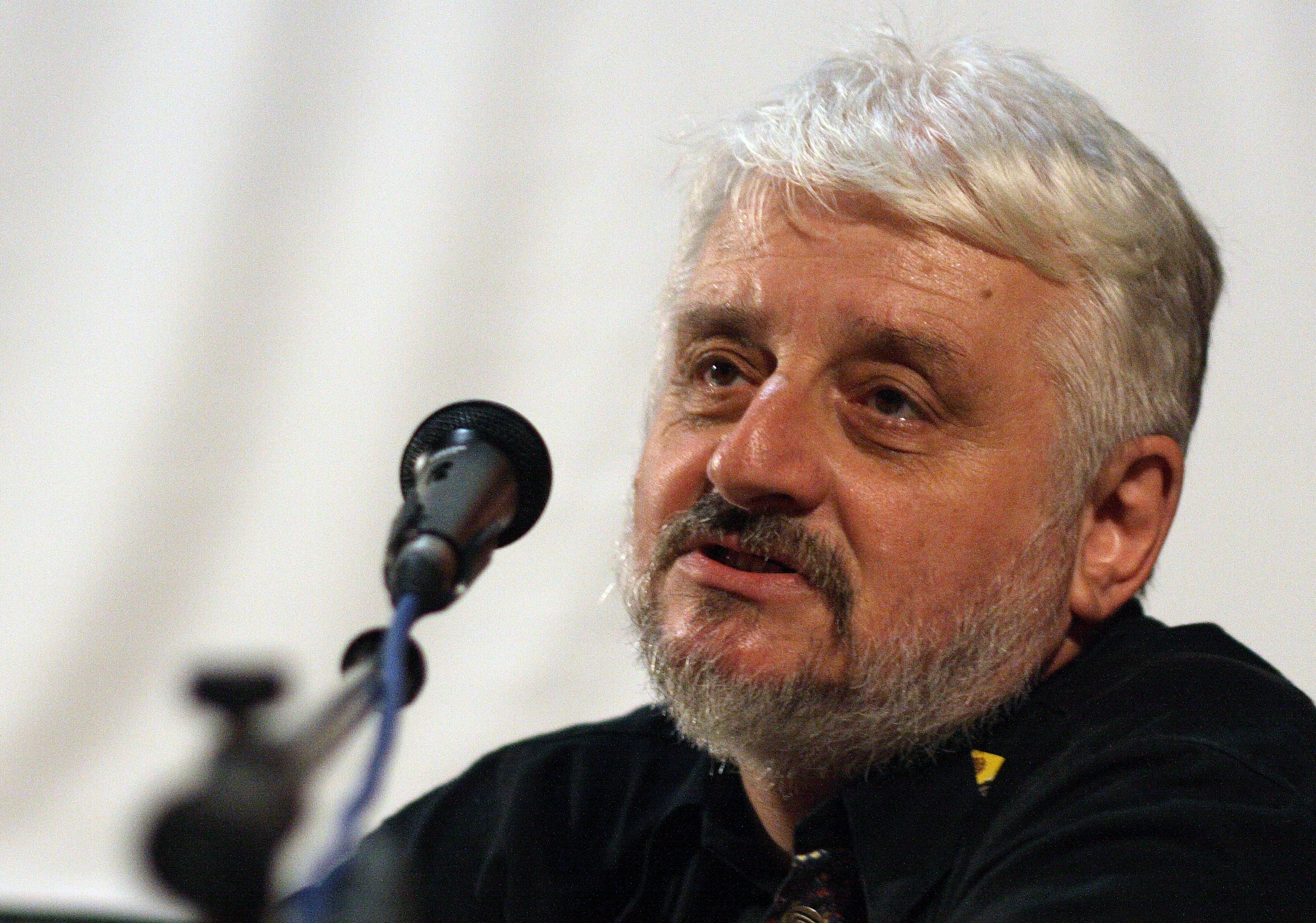
- Khersonskyi in 2009
- Born: November 28, 1950 (age 75); Chernivtsi, Ukrainian SSR, Soviet Union
- Education: Odesa National Medical University
- Occupations: clinical psychologist, psychiatrist, poet, interpreter
- Spouse: Liudmyla
- Children: one son and one daughter
- Father: Hryhorii Robertovych

Borys Hryhorovych Khersonskyi (Ukrainian: Борис Григорович Херсонський; born 28 November 1950) is a Ukrainian clinical psychologist, psychiatrist, poet, interpreter, Candidate of Medical Sciences, associate professor, and former dissident. He was the head of the Department of Clinical Psychology at Odesa National University from 1999 to 2015.
