= Gali-Dana Singer =

Russian Israeli poet and artist

Gali-Dana Singer (Hebrew: גלי-דנה זינגר; born April 23, 1962) is a Russian and Hebrew poet, artist, photographer, and translator who was born in Saint-Petersburg, Russia. She studied at the Leningrad State Institute of Theatre, Music and Cinematography in her hometown for three years, before deciding to leave without obtaining a degree. She immigrated to Israel from her native Leningrad in 1988, passing through and living in Riga with her husband Nekod Singer for three years before eventually settling down in Jerusalem where they currently reside. In the Israeli capital, her literary career and engagement in Russian and Hebrew culture and literature flourished.

The early years of her literary career took place in Russia, though she never participated in writing groups and only read her poetry to "her father and an older friend." She never published in Russia, where she was a Zionist, despite being encouraged to, because she was planning on emigrating and did not want to subject her potential publishers to "problems at work". Her artistic development began in Israel, where she not only started expressing herself in other such media platforms as visual arts, photography and book illustrations, but also worked on extending her poetic breadth by writing in other languages (e.g. English and Hebrew) and translating existing pieces of literature.

Two years after settling in Israel, she displayed some of her work, namely her book illustrations, at exhibitions of children's books at the Israel Museum in Jerusalem alongside her husband. The bulk of her career, distinctions and legacy has concerned Russian and Hebrew literature, poetry and translations. In 1992, Gali-Dana published her first official book of poetry titled Collection which was followed by another, Adel Kil'ka. From, the following year.

Since 1993, she has been a member of the General Union of Writers in Israel as well as a member of the Jerusalem Literary Club where she has been the director of a Poetry Seminar. In addition, she was the editor-in-chief of the two Russian literary journals--IO and Dvojetochie--between the years 1994 and 1995, and since 1997. She has been publishing numerous literary periodicals in Israel, and has been an editor for the Russian journal Dvojetochie which later included Hebrew pieces of literature within its pages, thus making it officially a bilingual journal.

In 2001, she published another Russian collection of poetry called To Think: River which would become the first piece of her own literature that she would translate into Hebrew. One year later, Singer became the editor in chief of another Russian-Hebrew bilingual journal called Dvojetochije-Nekudataim and published the following poetry compilations: Blind Poems and Yarusarim Besieged.

== Immigration and Integration ==
In the late 80's, it was impossible for Singer and her husband to leave the Soviet Union from Leningrad to Israel, so they became Refuseniks and moved to Riga where it was more possible to emigrate from.

Gali-Dana Singer has mentioned having different expectations from Israeli life and culture, though it has not prevented her from integrating. A main part of her struggle has been with the language barrier and being able to find the correct words. Furthermore, since immigrating to Israel, her aim has been to integrate and see that both her cultures concur in her current environment.

Singer has strove for successful integration in spite of the 1990s post-Soviet Aliyah, i.e. a time characterized by numerous and successive waves of immigration from the Post-Soviet States to Israel, which produced among certain newcomers a near-imperialist conception of Russian culture, whereby arts and other such cultural elements were valued more if they originated in Russia than if they were produced in Israel . On this, Gali-Dana Singer made the following remark:

"They accept... the supremacy of culture that they know and love. And what is more, some of the culture's consumers also feel that they are superior to Russian culture produced here. They attend every show that is imported from Russia, but will not buy tickets for a show in Russian that is produced here. The press emphasizes this position, probably to flatter the immigrants, which is a very common way of thinking. I find it really sad."

Her embracing of Hebrew culture, coupled with her desire to integrate, is at the heart of her denunciation of the aforementioned cultural supremacy. On a similar note, Singer has worked to immerse herself in her Jewish heritage all while preserving her Russian identity, and in doing so has partaken in forming a new culture which she does not view in any dimmer light than that of her former homeland. For instance, she has made a point of learning Hebrew so as to step outside the Russian cultural enclave that could have kept her at odds with the Israeli majority. On such matters, she commented:

"I am a poet who writes Russian and Hebrew. I live here and was born there, and both of them are important to me. I do not want to construct a huge wall to protect and define me. I would not want to close myself up in one particular direction; that is the distinctive nature of my life, if I am already stretching myself in two directions and I have these squinting eyes, why not use them?"

== Learning Hebrew ==
Adia Mendelson-Maoz, in her book Multiculturalism in Israel: Literary Perspectives, underlines Singer's thoughts on learning a new language, which is based on her experience immigrating to Israel. Gali-Dana acknowledges that she is culturally different from the Israeli majority. This influenced her belief that Russian immigrants should undergo a "cultural and lingual change" in the face of their new environment. On a similar note, she observed that we choose neither our birthplace nor our mother tongue--which is the foundation of a person's writing--so the arduous struggle at hand, which is as artistic as it is cultural, is characterized by the strive to find and express oneself using new words. Pointing out that mother is an analogy for the mother tongue, Mendelson-Maoz includes the following poem, which Singer wrote in English, as an example:

"Here you can change a word, there a wording

but nothing can be rewritten as a rule.

It's too late every time I try.

Writing is a mother. The primary source for the dunces.

You cannot change a mother or can you, can?

A mouthful of hysterical giggles, a handful of coppers."

In an interview for Poetry International conducted by Lisa Katz, an English-language editor, Gali-Dana provided some detail concerning her experience learning Hebrew, and how she likened it to Russian: "[...] The fact that I am so close to language in my Russian poems is what caused my proximity to Hebrew. I accepted the new language in exactly the same proportions. Of course I'm the same poet but I write different things in a different language. What moves me to write is mainly the experience of language. If I wanted to express only my personal experience, my life, I wouldn't need to write in a different language."

Her love of language has driven her journey toward mastering Hebrew, and has inevitably shaped her approach toward integrating to Israeli life and culture. It has also served as a principal premise in her views on multiculturalism.

== Experiencing Language as a Translator ==
Years after settling in Jerusalem, her observations have shifted toward the translating works of either language into the other. In the interview with Lisa Katz, Gali-Dana stated that translating poems from Russian to Hebrew or vice versa was possible, but inevitably changed the original meaning of the poem, attributing a new and distinct life to the translated poem. In her words, when translating, she is "creating something parallel", which she credits to the intricate structure of Russian and Hebrew.

Having been a leader in workshops tasked with creating Russian and Hebrew anthologies, and being the editor in chief of the bilingual Russian and Hebrew journal Dvojetochije-Nekudataim, she has translated countless poems to and from the aforementioned languages, and occasionally in English as well. As a result, she has made observations on translations, such as the one explained in the former paragraph, and in the same interview with Lisa Katz, she added the following in the dialogue:

"I always emphasize that I haven’t switched from Russian to Hebrew, rather that I am moving back and forth from Russian to Hebrew and Hebrew to Russian. I have tried to reconstruct how the transfer took place, a process which is still vivid in my memory. It seemed to happen one way, but then I remembered that the process actually began much earlier, when someone tried to translate a poem of mine [into Hebrew] and I didn’t like the result and I started to write it myself and I saw that it was impossible to translate it as it was in the original, and not worthwhile, because what works in Russian doesn’t work in Hebrew. Even if I have a raw translation in front of me I don’t know exactly which way I’ll go."

Finally, Mendelson-Maoz writes that Gali-Dana "maintains that the difficulty in learning a language lies not in the intellectual sphere but in the mental one." The latter position that Singer holds is expressed by the observation that she made in the interview, because the idea that she is communicating depicts languages as a uniquely intricate way of experiencing the world, hence overruling the conception of language as a discipline. That being said, it was after explaining Singer's claim that the roots of our mother tongue are ineradicable that Mendelson-Maoz wrote the aforementioned statement. He related her artistic and cultural struggle to find new words with which she could express herself to her disapproval of the Russian cultural supremacy that cast many newcomers to the margins of Israeli society. He relates these three ideas to explain how Gali-Dana's experience with language, especially as a translator, shaped many of her views on multiculturalism in Israel.

== Multilingualism and Multiculturalism ==
Gali-Dana Singer has been praised for her approach to Hebrew, and is held in high regard in the Russo-Israeli literary community for grasping the language of Israel and stepping beyond her linguistic comfort zone. In fact, Ya'ara Ben David, another Israeli poet, said the following on the reluctance of certain Russian immigrants in the face of learning Hebrew and on the steps needed to integrate as a collective with this Middle-Eastern environment:

"In many cases, adherence to the mother tongue stems from a psychological difficulty to become receptive to new experience. An emotional barrier is erected that limits the writer to the borders of her [first] language and culture. One must praise the opposite phenomenon, of which Gali-Dana Singer takes part. Her sensitivity to poetic language in general and the way she manages the challenges of Hebrew in particular explain her widespread use of word play and rhyme."

Her strive to integrate successfully in Israeli culture, her disapproval of Russian cultural supremacy in Israel and her conception of language have amounted to an eclectic collection of poetic volumes and compilations in English, Hebrew and Russian. According to Maoz, it is precisely this "[multilingual and] intellectually desirable and balanced" approach to literature and poetry that make up her case in favour of multiculturalism, which Gali-Dana encourages through her artistic platforms. As a symbol of this ideal that she has, Maoz included her poem Selected Poetry of the Dining Room, then making the obvious observation that the furniture represents the disparate cultures that coincide in Israel, unfolding under the (paraphrased) umbrella question: "can these cultures cohabit?"

Finally, in the interview with Lisa Katz, the interviewer asked for Singer's thoughts concerning the fact that English poetry has had a greater influence over Hebrew literature than Russian poetry has in the previous four decades, to which Gali-Dana replied: "I'm not so afraid of the influence of English because I think everything comes in its own time; there have been periods with other poetics and aesthetics. The main impetus for poetry is the language that a person feels. Chaim Lensky wrote in Hebrew in St. Petersburg and in exile in Siberia. It doesn't matter where we live or even which language we hear." The open and welcoming she has on matters concerning cultural influence can be found as often in her opinions as in her poetry.

== Works, Features and Translations (English) ==
Every major literary magazine in Israel has featured her work. Poetry International also features her poem 'The one whose silence is the world' (see link). She also appears in a University of Iowa anthology of English translations of Russian-language women poets.

1992, Collection

1993, Adel Kil'ka. From

1998, Shalom Aleichem (anthology of half a century's worth of Israeli Poetry that she translated herself)

1999, “Poets’ Dialogue” Anthology (edited with Peter Kriksunov 1999)

2000, To Think: River (in Hebrew)

2002, Blind Poems (in Hebrew) and Yarusarim Besieged

2006, The Coiner of Incidents (in Hebrew)

2013, Two poems featured in An Anthology of Contemporary Russian Women Poets (ed. Daniel Weissbort and Valentina Polukhin)

2014, Savely Grinberg. Beh-do-ir, Ra'anana, Even Hoshen (as a translator)

2017, Translucent (in Hebrew)

N/A, "I'm Not Christina Rossetti But I Also Read Tennyson, Told Cecilia in Praise of Lesser Gods" (in English)

Gali-Dana Singer I'M NOT CHRISTINA ROSSETTI BUT I ALSO READ TENNYSON, TOLD CECILIA IN PRAISE OF LESSER GODS

As of 2020, she is currently working with American poet Stefan Ellis on a collaborative project called "Other or Some: A Collaborative Poetry Project."

In total, she has published seven volumes in Russian and four in Hebrew. Furthermore, she has translated numerous poems and has been a leader in workshops tasked with creating Russian and Hebrew anthologies. She also has had her own poems translated in the latter languages, as well as in English, Spanish, Yiddish, Latvian and Georgian.

== Books in Hebrew ==
לחשוב: נהר. מרוסית - אמיר אור, רות בלומרט, זלי גורביץ', מרדכי גלדמן, מרים נייגר-פליישמן, פטר קריקסונוב והמשוררת. תל אביב: הקיבוץ המאוחד, 2000.

שירים עיוורים. תל-אביב: הקיבוץ המאוחד, 2002.

צורף מקרים. רעננה: אבן חושן, 2006.

שקופים למחצה. רעננה : אבן חושן, 2017.

אשליה מתקנת. חיפה: פרדס, 2024

== Translations from Russian into Hebrew ==
שיח משוררים : אנתולוגיה דו-לשונית של תרגומים עבריים לשירה הנכתבת בישראל בשפה הרוסית.עורכים גלי-דנה זינגר, פטר קריקסונוב. תל-אביב : הקיבוץ המאוחד, 1999.

סביילי גרינברג. בדו-עיר: שירים. תרגמה מרוסית גלי-דנה זינגר. רעננה, אבן חושן, 2014.

== Books in Russian ==
1992, Сборник. Иерусалим: Аудитория.

1993, Адель Килька. Из. 1985.Иерусалим: Аудитория.

2002, Осажденный Ярусарим. Иерусалим: Гешарим; М.: Мосты культуры.

2005, Часть це. М.: АРГО-РИСК; Тверь: Колонна, 2005.

2009, Хождение за назначенную черту. М.: Новое литературное обозрение.

2013, Точки схода, точка исчезновения. М.: Новое литературное обозрение.

2016, Взмах и взмах. Ozolnieki: Literature Without Borders, 2016.

2024, ЗЕМЛЯ ЗЕМЛЯ. Иерусалим: Двоеточие, 2024. (The book was shortlisted for the 2025 Andrei Bely Prize in the Poetry category).

== Translations from Hebrew and English into Russian ==
1998, Мир да пребудет с вами: Стихи современных поэтов Израиля. М.: Радуга.

2013, Исраэль Элираз. Гёльдерлин и другие стихотворения. М.: АРГО-РИСК; Тверь: Колонна.

2016, Йона Волах. Дела.Калининград: PhocaBooks.

2016, Хези Лескли. Палец. Калининград: PhocaBooks.

2017, Дэвид Шапиро. Человек без книги. Ozolnieki: Literature Without Borders.

== Involvement in Russian-Israeli Literary Communities ==
Gali-Dana has been fairly active in Israel and has participated in many literary events. She's been to the Poetry Festival in a small Israeli town called Metulla three times where in 2000 she won the Teva Poetry Prize. She has also been to the International Jerusalem Poets Festival, as well as to Moscow International Festival of Poets.

== Awards ==
1997 -- Absorption Ministry's Prize for Israeli immigrant writers

2000 -- Teva Poetry Prize at the Israeli Poetry Festival in Metula

2004 -- Prime Minister Levi Eshkol Literary Prize (Israel)

2025 -- Brenner Prize for the book Ashlaya metakenet (2024).
