= Alice Friman =

American poet (born 1933)

Alice Friman (born October 20, 1933) is an American poet. She has taught at a number of universities and helped to found the Indiana Writers' Center. She is Professor Emerita at the University of Indianapolis, and was poet-in-residence at Georgia College & State University. She also used to host a poetry podcast, "Ask Alice".

== Biography ==
Friman was born and raised in New York City. She married Elmer Friman in 1955, followed his job to Dayton, Ohio, in 1956, and in 1960 moved to Indianapolis, Indiana. Their children are H. Richard Friman, Paul Lawrence Friman, and Lillian Elaine Wilson. They divorced in 1975 and she married Marshall Bruce Gentry in 1989.

== Career ==
Friman is a graduate of Brooklyn College (1954), holds a master's degree from Butler University (1971), and received an honorary doctorate from the University of Indianapolis (2002). She started writing poetry seriously in her forties and is one of the founders of the Indiana Writers' Center. Friman taught English and creative writing at the University of Indianapolis from 1971 to 1993 and has been Professor Emerita of English and Creative Writing since 1993. She was named "Teacher of the Year" at U of I in 1993. She also taught at Randolph College, Ball State University, Indiana State University, IUPUI, and Curtin University in Perth, Australia. In 2003 she moved to Milledgeville, Georgia, where she was poet-in-residence in the MFA program at Georgia College & State University. Friman used to host a poetry podcast titled Ask Alice, which was sponsored by the Georgia College MFA program and some episodes can be seen on YouTube.

== Publications ==
Friman has published seven full-length collections of poetry: Blood Weather (LSU Press, 2019), The View from Saturn (LSU Press, 2014), Vinculum (LSU Press, 2011), The Book of the Rotten Daughter (BkMk Press, 2006), Zoo (University of Arkansas Press, 1999), Inverted Fire (BkMk Press, 1997), and Reporting from Corinth (The Barnwood Press, 1984). She has also authored several chapbooks of poetry: Driving for Jimmy Wonderland (Barnwood Press, 1992), Insomniac Heart (Years Press, 1990, 2nd printing 1991), Song to My Sister (Writers' Center Press, 1979), and A Question of Innocence (Raintree Press, Bloomington, IN, 1978). Her poetry has been included in numerous anthologies, including Pushcart Prize XXXVI and The Best American Poetry 2009. Essays by Friman include “Truth: The Road or the Rug” [essay on Carson McCullers] (published in The Georgia Review, 2012); “Letting Go” (published in The Movable Nest, Helicon Nine, Kansas City, MO, 2007); “The Office” (published in Arts & Letters Journal of Contemporary Culture, 2004); “Inking In the Myth” (published in Hopewell Review, 1996–97, and expanded in anthology Sleeping with One Eye Open: Women Writers and the Art of Survival, University of Georgia Press, 1999).

== Awards and honors ==
Friman's many awards include two Pushcart Prize (2021) (2012); Ekphrasis Prize for Poetry (2012); the Georgia Writers' Association's Georgia Author of the Year Award for Poetry (2012); James Boatwright III Prize for Poetry, Shenandoah (2001); Creative Renewal Fellowship, Arts Council of Indianapolis (1999-2000); Individual Artist Fellowship, Indiana Arts Commission (1996–97); Poetry Society of America's Lucille Medwick Memorial Award (1993), Cecil Hemley Memorial Award (1990), and Consuelo Ford Award (1988); New England Poetry Club's Gretchen Warren Award (2011) and Erika Mumford Prize (1990, 2008); and Society for the Study of Midwestern Literature's Midwest Poetry Award (1990). She has been a Fellow at numerous literary colonies and centers including MacDowell, Yaddo, Bernheim Arboretum and Research Forest, VCCA, Millay, Leighton, Carson McCullers Center for Writers and Musicians, and Georgia Review/Bowers House Literary Center.

== Critical opinion ==
Reviewers have expressed appreciation of Friman's poetry in publications including Poetry Daily, Image Journal, KCUR, Hollins Critic, and The Prairie Schooner.
