= Hugh Selwyn Mauberley =

Poem

Hugh Selwyn Mauberley (1920) is a long poem by Ezra Pound. It has been regarded as a turning point in Pound's career (by F. R. Leavis and others), and its completion was swiftly followed by his departure from England. The name "Selwyn" might have been an homage to Rhymers' Club member Selwyn Image. The name and personality of the titular subject are also reminiscent of T. S. Eliot's main character in "The Love Song of J. Alfred Prufrock".

== Structure ==
The poem consists of eighteen short poems which are grouped into two sections. The first is an autobiography of Ezra Pound himself, as indicated by the title of the first poem, which reads "E.P. Ode pour l'élection de son sépulchre" ("Ezra Pound: Ode for the Choice of His Sepulchre"). The second section introduces us to the struggling poet "Mauberley"'s character, career, and fate. Readers have been misled by the fact that Pound assigns to every poem a title or, alternatively, a number. Thus poem I, "E.P. Ode pour l'Election de Son Sépulchre", is followed by poems II–V, that are numbered, while poems VI–IX are again given individual titles. As a consequence, in some websites poems II–V are reprinted as if they were parts II–V of "E.P. Ode". They are in fact individual poems in a sequence of which "E.P.: Ode" is only poem I.

== A brief analysis ==
Hugh Selwyn Mauberley addresses Pound's alleged failure as a poet. F. R. Leavis considered it "quintessential autobiography."

Speaking of himself in the third person, Pound criticises his earlier works as attempts to "wring lilies from the acorn", that is to pursue aesthetic goals and art for art's sake in a rough setting, America, which he calls "a half-savage country". "For three years, out of key with his time/He strove to resuscitate the dead art/Of poetry" resonates with Pound's efforts to write in traditional forms (e.g., Canzoni, 1911) and subsequent disillusionment. Pound in his mock-epitaph is said to be "wrong from the start", but this is quickly qualified: "No, hardly–". The rest of the poem is essentially a defense of Pound, who, like Capaneus, was attempting to hold back an overwhelming flood of philistinism.

In the third stanza, Pound is said to have listened to the song of Homer's Syrens (quoted in Greek: "Ἴδμεν γάρ τοι πάνθ', ὅσ 'ένι Τροίη" – "We know all the things that belong to Troy"), to have confronted dangers and ignored the warnings of the prudent. This has led inevitably to his being dismissed as an outsider and forgotten by the literary establishment, "in the 31st year of his life", i.e. c. 1916, when Pound published Lustra.

In Poems II and III, Pound turns the tables upon the philistine modern age, denouncing its materialism, consumerism, bad taste and betrayal of tradition. Poems IV and V express Pound's outrage at World War I, a murderous product of that very age that has dismissed him: "There died a myriad/And of the best, among them,/For an old bitch gone in the teeth,/For a botched civilisation".

This section can be read as a wider attack upon the attitudes of society in the post-war period, on a "botched civilisation" – denounced as an intellectual and moral 'Waste Land' only two years later by T. S. Eliot. The exclamation "Better mendacities/ Than the classics in paraphrase!" seems to be a quip at the expense of those who continue to revere the idealistic "lies" and to dismiss works that draw on valuable traditional texts, such as Pound's own Homage to Sextus Propertius.

Poems VI–XII are a brief overview of British culture as Pound found it when he arrived in London in 1908, starting with the Pre-Raphaelites and the Rhymers' Club, and closing with vignettes of three writers (Max Beerbohm, Arnold Bennett, Ford Madox Ford), a suburban wife and a literary hostess.

Poem XII formally closes with a criticism of the current tastes and concerns of society:

Beside this thoroughfare
The sale of half-hose has
Long since superseded the cultivation
Of Pierian roses. (lines 216–219)

As "Pierian roses" refers to the place in Greece where the Muses were worshiped, the charge is that society has become absorbed in commodities and lost its taste for art.

Part I terminates with "Envoi", i.e. "Farewell", a poem printed in italics in which Pound in fact "resuscitates the dead art of poetry" (as he had said in Poem I) by addressing a singer in "canorous lyric measures" (Leavis). "Envoi (1919)" ends on a positive note. Its last lines are: "Till change hath broken down / All things save Beauty alone."

The second part of the poem, "Mauberley 1920", introduces the character Hugh Selwyn Mauberley, a minor poet who perfects refined but irrelevant artworks, or "medallions". His defeat is told (by Pound) in Poem I in short minimalist lines, of the kind that Mauberley himself would write. Poem II tells us of Mauberley's love-troubles, suggesting that he observed beauty but could not act at the right moment (as a Henry James character, see for example "The Beast in the Jungle", and Eliot's "Prufrock"). Poem III is a narrative criticism of Mauberley as aesthete, and Poem IV closes his story by telling us that he retired and expired in the Pacific islands. Like Part I, Part II has a farewell poem, "Medallion", the description of a female singer, seen as a work of art rather than as a woman. This poem has usually been read by critics as "written by Mauberley", an example of his kind of frosty albeit perfect writing. Mauberley in his passiveness is distinct from Pound, who however pursued for a while similar ideals of artistic perfection, and was attracted by life in beautiful and remote natural surroundings. By moving to Italy in 1925, Pound in a way exiled himself like Mauberley, while becoming increasingly involved in the conflicts of his age. Thus in Mauberley Pound portrayed and criticised certain aspects of himself, as Eliot had done in "The Love Song of J. Alfred Prufrock". Yet while "Prufrock" is ironic, Mauberley is largely a work of satire, reminiscence and invective, like The Cantos.
