= Kerry Hardie =

Irish poet and novelist

- Born: 1951 (age 74–75); Singapore
- Occupations: Novelist, Poet

Kerry Hardie is an Irish poet and novelist.

== Life and work ==
Kerry Hardie was born in Singapore in 1951, and lived in Bangor, County Down and was educated in the University of York. Today she is married to Seán Hardie, a writer and TV executive, and lives in Kilkenny. She worked for the BBC Northern Ireland and the Arts Council of Northern Ireland. She has won a wide number of poetry awards and scholarships and residencies have taken her to countries including Australia, France and China. She is a member of Aosdána.

== Awards ==
- Hennessey Award for Poetry, joint winner, 1995
- UK National Poetry Award, 1996
- Michael Hartnett Award, joint winner, 2005
- Women's National Poetry Prize, Twice winner
- The Patrick and Kathleen Kavanagh Award
- The Lawrence O’Shaughnessy Award for Poetry, Minnesota. [2014]

Jennifer Matthews, in Poetry International (q.d.; 2011)

‘Hardie’s poetry is brave, steadily confronting both the deaths of her loved ones and her own experiences with illness as an ME (Myalgic Encephalomyelitis) sufferer. Her collections contain gentle, but insistent, works of memento mori ... What makes her work exceptional is how skilfully she illustrates the connection between humanity and the cycles in the natural world. Poems and lives move through the unstoppable clockwork of seasons in her collections… A unique aspect of Hardie’s poetry is the hope that is present in all her collections. She guides us through tragedy, reassuring us but never romanticising the true nature of life.’

== Bibliography ==
=== Poetry ===
- In Sickness: Poems (1995)
- A Furious Place (1996)
- Camping (1997)
- Cry for the Hot Belly (2000)
- The Sky Didn't Fall (2003)
- The Silence Came Close (2006)
- Only This Room (2009)
- Selected Poems (2011)
- The Ash and the Oak and the Wild Cherry Tree (2012)
- The Zebra Stood in The Night (2014)
- The Great Blue Whale (2017)
- Where Now Begins (2020)
- We Go On (2024)

=== Novels ===
- Hannie Bennet's Winter Marriage (2000)
- The Bird Woman (2006)

=== Editor ===
- editor, with Mark Roper, Ink Bottle: New Writing from Kilkenny (2001)
