= Leland Hickman =

American poet

Leland Hickman (September 15, 1934 – May 12, 1991) was an American poet, editor, actor, and literary magazine publisher. During his lifetime, Hickman was best known as the publisher and editor of the influential magazine Temblor which was noted for the publication of many east and west coast language-related poets. His editorial and publishing activities brought the work of many established and emerging poets into the public view. Hickman has steadily gained posthumous recognition and fame for his poetry.

== Life and work ==
=== Early years ===
Hickman was born on September 5, 1934 in Santa Barbara, California. He lived with his family in Bakersfield from 1937 to 1945. He attended Santa Barbara College, now University of California, Santa Barbara, and later studied at the University of California, Berkeley, where he played with the Berkeley Drama Guild.

After a tour in the Army, Hickman moved to New York City to continue his career in theater. In 1960 he returned to California to play at the Equity Library Theatre West in Los Angeles. After stints in New York City and San Francisco, Hickman settled permanently in Los Angeles with his partner, the actor Charles Macaulay.

=== Literary career ===
His literary career began in the middle 1960s with the publication of the poem "Lee Sr Falls to the Floor" in The Hudson Review. A book-length section of his serial poem, "Tiresias", entitled "Tiresias, Great Slave Lake Suite", was published by Momentum Press in 1980. It was named a finalist for the Los Angeles Times Book Award in Poetry.

A second book, Lee Sr Falls to the Floor (which collected early poems and several sections of "Tiresias"), was published posthumously by Jahbone Press in 1991.

=== Publishing career ===
Hickman worked as a poetry editor for the Los Angeles literary magazine Bachy, published by Papa Bach Bookstore, from 1977 to the spring of 1981. He edited issues nine to eighteen.

In 1981, he co-founded with Paul Vangelisti the magazine Boxcar: A Magazine of the Arts. The magazine ran for two issues.

In 1985, Hickman began publishing and editing Temblor, which continued for ten issues.

=== Death ===
Hickman died in Los Angeles of AIDS-related causes. He was 56 years old.

== Selected publications ==
- Tiresias: The Collected Poems of Leland Hickman, edited by Stephen Motika (Preface by Dennis Phillips and Afterwords by Bill Mohr), Nightboat Books, 2009.

== Suggested further reading ==
- Palmer, Michael (1995). "24 Logics In Memory Of Lee Hickman"; from At Passages. New York City: New Directions. pp. 101. ISBN 978-0811212946.
