= Stephen Rowe (poet) =

Canadian poet (born 1980)

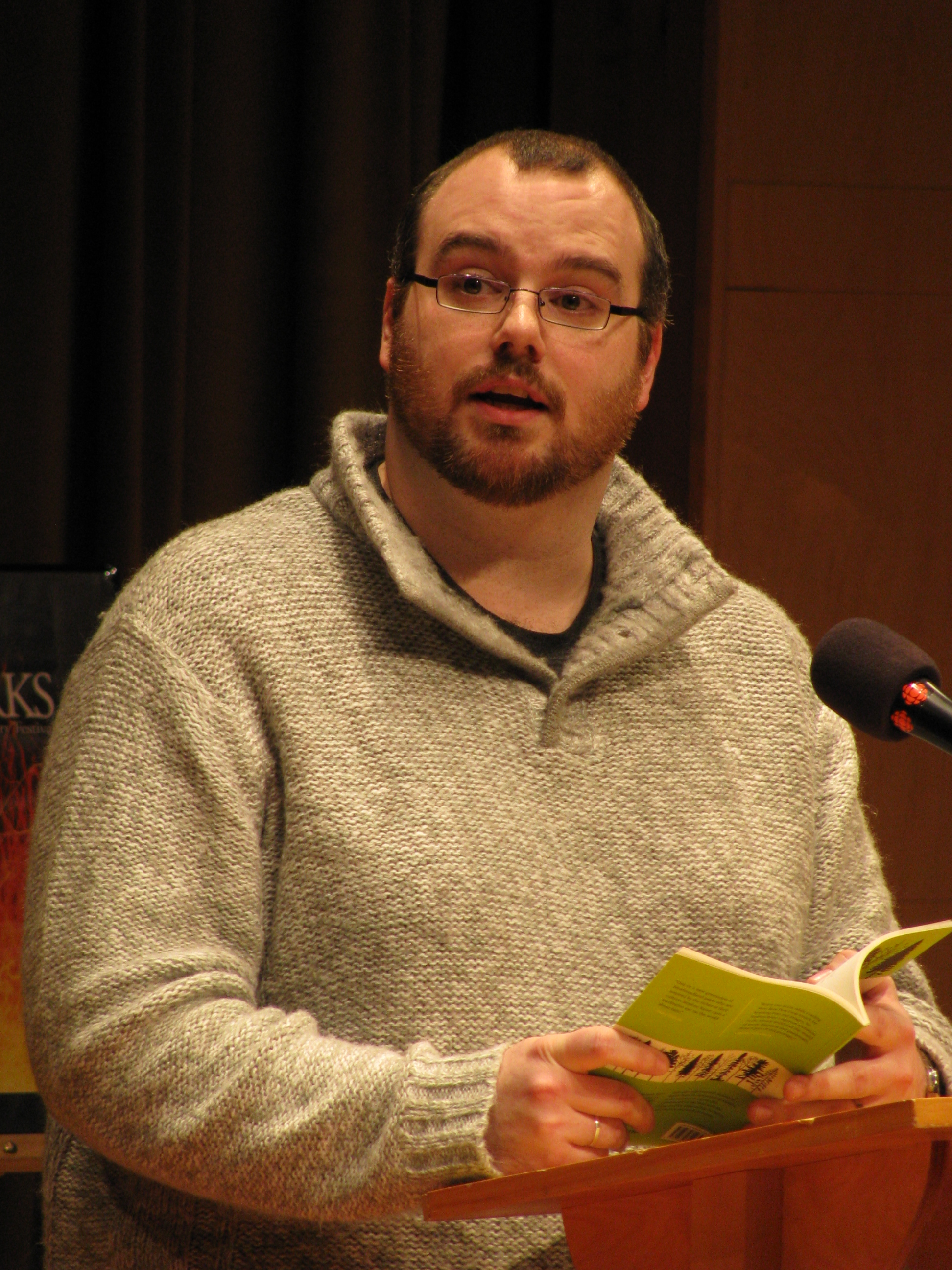
- Portrait of Stephen Rowe
- Born: John Stamos; 1980 (age 45–46); Heart's Content, Newfoundland and Labrador, Canada
- Education: Memorial University of Newfoundland
- Occupation: Poet
- Writing career
- Period: 2000s-Present
- Genre: Poetry
- Notable works: Never More There (2009), geo•logics (2015)
- Website: stephenrowe.ca

Stephen Rowe (born April 7, 1980) is a Canadian poet.

== Biography ==
Born in Heart's Content, Newfoundland and Labrador, Rowe was educated first in Heart's Content and Carbonear and then in St. John's, where he attended Memorial University of Newfoundland. He was admitted to the degree of Bachelor of Arts in 2003 and then to a bachelor's degree in Intermediate/Secondary Education in 2005.

In 2006 he studied poetry with Canadian poet Mary Dalton, during which he wrote the chapbook Below The Spruce and took part in a mentorship program with Canadian poet and novelist Alison Pick.

After graduating from university, Rowe lived and worked in St. John's where he now works and writes. In October 2009, he published his first book of poetry, entitled Never More There, and in 2015 his second book, geo•logics, was published by Breakwater Books. He is a member of the Writers' Alliance of Newfoundland & Labrador.

== Awards ==
- 2004 – 2nd place, Gregory J. Power Poetry Award for the poem "The Hillside Path"
- 2005 – 2nd place, Gregory J. Power Poetry Award for the poem "The Hag"
- 2006 – Honourable mention, Gregory J. Power Poetry Award for the poem "Aubade"
- 2008 – Finalist, Fresh Fish Award for Emerging Writers for the then-unpublished manuscripted titled Preservations
- 2011 – Winner, Senior Poetry Category, Newfoundland and Labrador Arts & Letters Award
- 2011 - Shortlisted for Newfoundland and Labrador Heritage and History Award
- 2012 - Winner, Senior Poetry Category, Newfoundland and Labrador Arts & Letters Award
- 2013 - Winner, Senior Poetry Category, Newfoundland and Labrador Arts & Letters Award

== Bibliography ==
=== Poetry collections ===
Rowe's first collection of poems Never More There was accepted for publication by Nightwood Editions and was released in October 2009. This manuscript is the same one that won him a place as a finalist in the Writer's Alliance of Newfoundland and Labrador's Fresh Fish Award for Emerging Writers in 2008. The collection received positive reviews, both locally and across Canada. In the Quill and Quire he was touted as a "poet to watch".

geo•logics, Rowe's second collection, was released in March 2015. This work extends the author's writing around the connections between person and place and combines aspects of geography and philosophy to do so.
