= Peggy O'Brien =

American educator

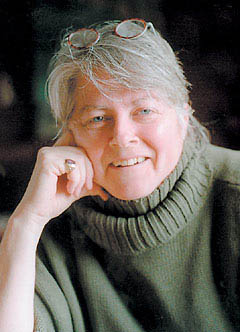
- Education: Trinity Washington University (BA); American University (Doctor of Philosophy)
- Occupation: Educator
- Employer(s): Brooklyn Academy of Music; Georgetown University; Trinity Washington University

Peggy O'Brien is an American educator who is the founding director of education at the Folger Shakespeare Library and an authority in the teaching of Shakespeare and literature. She is a director of SAGE Publications, board chair of St. Coletta School in Washington, D.C. and past board chair at Trinity Washington University. She is general editor of the Shakespeare Set Free series of books on the teaching of Shakespeare. O'Brien is a resident consulting teacher at the Brooklyn Academy of Music and launched and published Shakespeare Magazine. O'Brien teaches at Georgetown University and Trinity Washington University.

== Education and early career ==
O'Brien attended Trinity College in Washington, DC (now Trinity Washington University) and graduated with a Bachelor of Arts degree in 1969. The same year she began teaching high school English at public schools in Washington, D.C., where she continued teaching until 1975. In 1971, O'Brien graduated from The Catholic University of America with a Master of Arts degree. From 1973 to 1976, she served as the education coordinator of the Street Law Project at Georgetown University Law Center. She graduated with a Doctor of Philosophy degree from American University in 1993.

== Career ==
O'Brien began at the Folger Shakespeare Library in 1981, originally hired to run the Museum docent program. Noticing that the library's only education programs were aimed at graduate students, O'Brien established the Library's education mission and its commitment to elementary, middle, and high school students and their teachers. "Soon after, tribes of fourth- through twelfth-grade teachers and students began flowing through the Folger Library on a regular basis. Day-long workshops with actors and scholars for teachers. A special fellowship semester for 18 seniors from high schools all around the metropolitan DC area. Seventh through twelfth graders in the winter, and fourth through sixth graders in the spring, turned up for the student Shakespeare festivals."

O'Brien founded the Folger Shakespeare Library's education division, and started a full range of educational programs, including the Teaching Shakespeare Institute, funded by the National Endowment for the Humanities. She created a network of smaller institutes and workshops that serve teachers around the United States in their own classrooms as well as at the Folger, bringing teachers from all over the country to study together there with distinguished faculties of scholars, actors, and teachers assembled especially for this purpose.

Since her return to the Folger in 2013, the Library's education programs include expanded national programs (online master classes, the establishment of a National Teacher Corps, widely distributed educational materials on the First Folio) as well as local programs (a larger and stronger Library docent program, creation of curriculum and professional development for DC Public Schools).

O'Brien joined the Corporation for Public Broadcasting in 1994, and until 2000 served as vice president of education. She left in 2000 to become chief learning officer and chief operating officer of internet start-up company Knowledge In, Knowledge Out, Inc. (KIKO) in Long Beach, California from 2000 to 2001. In 2001, O'Brien was recruited by the National Cable & Telecommunications Association as executive director of the National Cable and Telecommunications Education Foundation, where she served until 2004 when she returned to CPB as Senior Vice President Education. In all these roles, she supported early and developing education technology projects in schools across the country. O'Brien worked with Masterpiece to produce Masterpiece Theatre's American Collection, a series of television adaptations of American novels, including The Song of the Lark by Willa Cather, Cora Unashamed by Langston Hughes, The Ponder Heart by Eudora Welty, A Death in the Family by James Agee, and Almost a Woman by Esmeralda Santiago. As the only teacher working at CPB, O'Brien had the notion to bring together English teachers from all over the country to collaborate on ways to teach these films and making them accessible to students. She spearheaded a collaboration between the National Council of Teachers of English and CPB which resulted in the films premiering at the NCTE convention and a website featuring contributions from a national community of teachers. She shaped and administered the successful Ready To Learn initiative, a collaboration between public broadcasting and the US Department of Education that resulted in the creation of content for television and other devices that helped underserved children learn to read.

In 2008, she was recruited by Chancellor Michelle Rhee and served as chief of family and public engagement for District of Columbia Public Schools until 2011.

== Publications ==
- "What’s Past: The founding head of education at the Folger Library on how it all got started", English Journal, September 2009
- Shakespeare Set Free Series, New York: Washington Square Press, creator and general editor, 1993–1995 (second editions, 2006)
- "Technology is Vital for Strong Education", Multichannel News, backpage, April 24, 2002
- "Shakespeare Reborn", Humanities, Summer 1996
- "'And Gladly Teach': Books, Articles, and a Bibliography on the Teaching of Shakespeare", Shakespeare Quarterly, Summer 1995

== Awards and honors ==
- Doctor of Humane Letters honoris causa, Georgetown University, May 1991
- The Public Humanities Award, D.C. Community Humanities Council, 1993
- Doctor of Laws honoris causa, Trinity College, May 1994
- Fillmore Arts Center, DC Public Schools, Arts Education Award, 1997
- Shakespeare Steward Award, 2008
