= Chris Hutchinson (poet) =

Canadian poet, novelist and educator (born 1972)

- Born: August 2, 1972 (age 54); Montreal, Quebec, Canada
- Education: University of Victoria, Victoria (BFA); Arizona State University (MFA); University of Houston (PhD)
- Writing career
- Genre: poetry
- Notable works: [Unfamiliar Weather] (2005); [Other People's Lives] (2009); [A Brief History of the Short-lived] (2012); [Jonas in Frames: an Epic] (2014); [In the Vicinity of Riches] (2020)

Chris Hutchinson (born August 2, 1972) in Montreal, Quebec, grew up on Vancouver Island, and has since lived, worked, and studied across Canada and the US, earning a BFA from the University of Victoria, an MFA in Creative Writing from Arizona State University, and a PhD in Literature and Creative Writing from the University of Houston.

Hutchinson is currently core faculty in the English Department at MacEwan University on Treaty 6 Territory, Amiskwacîwâskahikan (Edmonton, AB, Canada).

== Poetry books ==
- Unfamiliar Weather (Muses' Company, 2005)
- Other People's Lives (Brick Books, 2009)
- A Brief History of the Short-lived (Nightwood Editions, 2012)
- In the Vicinity of Riches (Goose Lane Editions / icehouse poetry, 2020)

== Novels ==
- Jonas in Frames: an Epic (Goose Lane Editions / icehouse poetry, 2014)

== Awards ==
- The Brazos Bookstore/Academy of American Poets Prize, poets.org, 2017
- Earle Birney Prize for Poetry, PRISM International, 2003
