= Doris Mühringer =

Austrian poet, short story writer and children's writer

Doris Mühringer (18 September 1920 – 26 May 2009) was an Austrian poet, short story writer, and children's writer. She has received a number of awards, and her contributions to Austrian poetry, which both are considered particularly significant.

== Biography ==
Born in Graz, Mühringer suffered a serious illness, when she was seven years old. After being bed-ridden for months, she had to learn how to walk again. During this period, she discovered the world of books, especially fairy tales, which provided her with exciting new experiences, often affecting her own poetry in later life.

In 1929, the family moved to Vienna, where she completed various studies at the University of Vienna without graduating. After the war, Mühringer settled in Salzburg, where she made a living translating from English, and taking on secretarial work and proof reading for publishing houses. She met the writer Hans Weigel, who persuaded her to move to Vienna, and became her mentor. In 1954, he published some of her poems in his collection, Stimmen der Gegenwart (Voices from the Present). In 1976, she published her own rather different version of the fairy tale "Der Wolf und die sieben Geißlein" ("The Wolf and the Seven Young Kids") by the Brothers Grimm, as part of the children's book Neues vom Rumpelstilzchen und andere Haus-Märchen von 43 Autoren, compiled by Hans-Joachim Gelberg.

Shortly after publication of Stimmen der Gegenwart, she received the Georg Trakl Poetry Award (1954), soon to be followed by the Bertelsmann Poetry Prize (1956). She has received a number of other awards, including the Boga-Tinti Prize in 1972. In 2001, she was awarded the Austrian Prize for Children's and Young Adult Literature (Österreichischer Kinder- und Jugendbuchpreis).

A member of the international PEN Club, and of the Austrian PODIUM, she moved in literary circles, took part in open readings, and, in 1969, went on a lecture tour to the United States. Despite her relatively few publications, the Austrian writer Gerhard Ruiss commented that there was absolutely no doubt Doris Mühringer was one of "the most important contributors to Austrian poetry over the last few decades".

== Works ==
- 1957 Gedichte I (poetry)
- 1969 Gedichte II (poetry)
- 1976 Staub öffnet das Auge. Gedichte III (poetry)
- 1976 Der Wolf und die sieben Geißlein
- 1984 Vögel die ohne Schlaf sind. Gedichte IV (poetry)
- 1985 Tanzen unter dem Netz (short stories)
- 1989 Das hatten die Ratten vom Schatten (humorous prose)
- 1995 Reisen wir (selected poems)
- 1999 Aber jetzt zögerst du (poetry)
- 2000 Auf der Wiese liegend (for children)
- 2000 Angesiedelt im Zwischenreich. Achtzig für achtzig
- 2002 Ausgewählte Gedichte (selected poems for children)
- 2005 Es verirrt sich die Zeit (complete works)
