= Stephen Motika =

American poet, editor, and publisher (born 1977)

- Born: 1977 (age 48–49); Santa Monica, California
- Education: Vassar, Brooklyn College
- Occupations: Poet, editor, and publisher
- Known for: Publisher of Nightboat Books
- Website: nightboat.org

Stephen Motika (born 1977 in Santa Monica, CA) is an American poet, editor, and publisher.

== Life and work ==
As of 2024, Motika is the director and publisher of Nightboat Books, a literary non-profit publisher based in Brooklyn, NY. Previously, he worked at Poets House in New York City from 2004 to 2017, where he was their Program Director.

Motika’s first book of poems, Western Practice, was published by Alice James Books in April 2012. He is also the author of three poetry chapbooks: Arrival and At Mono (2007) and In the Madrones (2011) both published by Sona Books; and Private Archive (2016). Motika's work has appeared, amongst other places, in The National Post of Canada, Another Chicago Magazine, and The Common Review.

Motika is the editor of Leland Hickman's Tiresias: The Collected Poems of Leland Hickman (2009) and, in 2017, he co-edited the book Dear Kathleen: On the Occasion of Kathleen Fraser’s 80th Birthday.

The Field, his collaboration with visual artist Dianna Frid, was on view at Gallery 400 at the University of Illinois, Chicago, in December 2003.

Motika has also worked as an educator and instructor at Naropa University and in the Stonecoast MFA Program at the University of Southern Maine.
