= Philip Appleman =

American poet and writer (1926–2020)

Philip D. Appleman (8 February 1926 – 11 April 2020) was an American poet and writer. He was a professor emeritus in the Department of English at Indiana University, Bloomington.

He published seven volumes of poetry, the first of which was Summer Love and Surf and the latest of which is Perfidious Proverbs (Humanity Books, 2011); three novels, including Apes and Angels (Putnam, 1989); and half a dozen nonfiction books, including the widely used Norton Critical Edition, Darwin and the Norton Critical Edition of Malthus' Essay on Population. His poetry and fiction have won many awards, including a fellowship in poetry from the National Endowment for the Arts, the Castagnola Award from the Poetry Society of America, the Friend of Darwin Award from the National Center for Science Education, and the Humanist Arts Award of the American Humanist Association, and have appeared in scores of publications, including Harper's Magazine, The Nation, New Republic, New York Times, Paris Review, Partisan Review, Poetry, Sewanee Review, and Yale Review.

He gave readings of his poetry at the Library of Congress, the Guggenheim Museum, the Huntington Library, and many universities. He read several of his poems on the July 6, 2012, episode of Moyers & Company.

He was a founding member of the Poets Advisory Committee of Poets House, New York, a former member of the governing board of the Poetry Society of America, and a member of the Academy of American Poets, PEN American Center, Friends of Poets & Writers, Inc., and the Authors Guild of America.

Appleman wrote many poems drawing on the work of Charles Darwin. In 2003 he signed the Humanist Manifesto.

Appleman died in April 2020 at the age of 94.
