= 1933 in poetry =

Nationality words link to articles with information on the nation's poetry or literature (for instance, Irish or France).

== Events ==
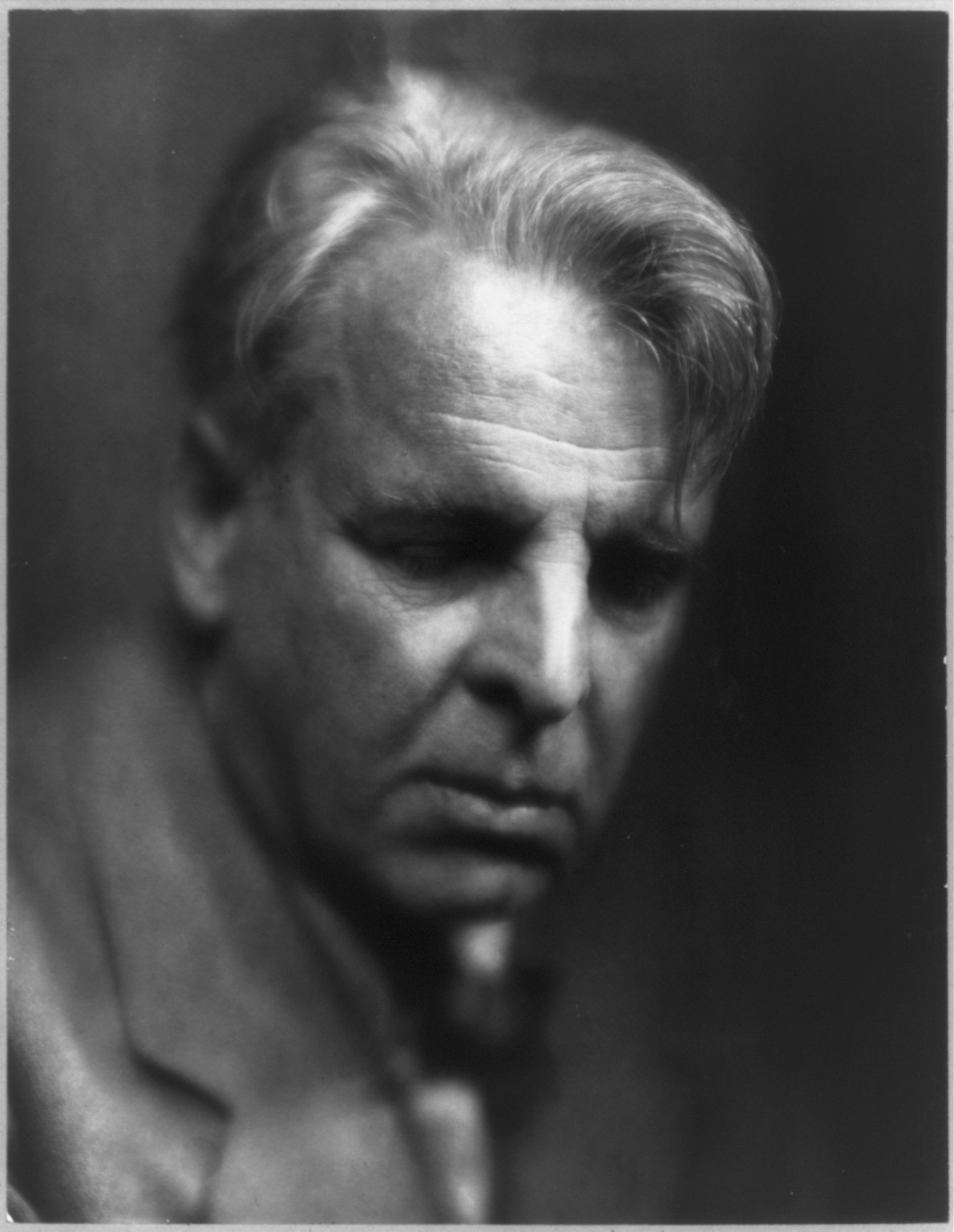
William Butler Yeats in 1933, the year The Winding Stair and Other Poems is published

- January – Geoffrey Grigson publishes the first issue of New Verse in London (1933–39).
- January–March – New Objectivity movement in German literature and art ends with the fall of the Weimar Republic.
- June – W. H. Auden has his "Vision of Agape".
- May 9 – A. E. Housman delivers his influential Leslie Stephen lecture, "The Name and Nature of Poetry", in Cambridge, asserting that poetry's function is "to transfuse emotion – not to transmit thought but to set up in the reader's sense a vibration corresponding to what was felt by the writer [...]". He criticizes much of the poetry from the 17th and 18th centuries as deficient in this regard, and condemns Alexander Pope's poetry in particular while praising William Collins, Christopher Smart, William Cowper and William Blake.
- Black Mountain College founded in the United States as a progressive, experimental educational institution which attracts poets who become known as the Black Mountain School of poetry.
- Objectivist Press founded.
- Beacon magazine in Trinidad ceases publication (founded in 1931).

== Works published in English ==
=== Canada ===
- Leo Kennedy, The Shrouding.
- Wilson MacDonald, Paul Marchand and Other Poems. Guy Ritter illus., Toronto: Pine Tree Publishing.
- Frederick George Scott, Selected Poems.

=== India, in English ===
- Lotika Ghose, White Dawns of Awakening ( Poetry in English ), Calcutta: Thacker, Spink and Co.
- Shriman Narayan, The Fountain of Life ( Poetry in English ), Bombay (second edition, Asia Publishing House, 1961)
- Maneck B. Pithawalla, Links with the Past ( Poetry in English ), London: Poetry League
- Mulk Raj Anand, The Golden Breath: Studies in Five Poets of New India, examined Rabindranath Tagore, Mohammad Iqbal, Puran Singh, Sarojini Naidu and Harindranath Chattopadhyay, written in English, India; criticism

=== United Kingdom ===
- Valentine Ackland and Sylvia Townsend Warner, Whether a Dove or a Seagull, English poets first published in the United States
- Lazarus Aaronson, Christ in the Synagogue
- W. H. Auden, Poems: Second Edition
- Roy Campbell, Flowering Reeds
- Cecil Day-Lewis, The Magnetic Mountain
- John Drinkwater, Summer Harvest
- Walter de la Mare, The Fleeting, and Other Poems
- T. S. Eliot, The Use of Poetry and the Use of Criticism, 1932-33 Norton lectures at Harvard published in November; lectures he delivers at the University of Virginia are published in 1934 as After Strange Gods
- Eleanor Farjeon, Over the Garden Wall
- John Gawsworth, pen name of Terence Ian Fytton Armstrong, Poems 1930–1932
- Robert Graves, Poems 1930–1933
- A. E. Housman, "The Name and Nature of Poetry", Leslie Stephen Lecture at Cambridge
- D. H. Lawrence, Last Poems
- Herbert Read, The End of a War
- Laura Riding, Poet: a Lying Word
- Vita Sackville-West, Collected Poems
- Siegfried Sassoon, The Road to Ruin
- Stephen Spender, Poems
- W. B. Yeats, Irish poet published in the United Kingdom:
  - Collected Poems
  - The Winding Stair and Other Poems

=== United States ===
- Léonie Adams, This Measure
- Stephen Vincent Benét, with Rosemary Carr Benet, A Book of Americans
- John Peale Bishop, Now with His Love
- Robert P. Tristram Coffin, Ballads of Square-Toed Americans
- Hart Crane, Collected Poems
- E. E. Cummings, EIMI
- Horace Gregory, No Retreat
- Edgar A. Guest, Life's Highway
- Robert Hillyer, Collected Verse
- Robinson Jeffers, Give Your Heart to the Hawks
- Archibald MacLeish:
  - Frescos for Mr. Rockefeller's City
  - Poems
- Ogden Nash, Happy Days
- Lizette Woodworth Reese, Pastures
- Edwin Arlington Robinson, Talifer
- Sara Teasdale, Strange Victory
- George Oppen, Discrete Series, published by the Objectivist Press
- Ezra Pound, editor, Active Anthology, London; American poet published in the United Kingdom
- Charles Reznikoff, Jerusalem the Golden and In Memoriam: 1933 published by the Objectivist Press
- William Carlos Williams, Collected Poems, Objectivist Press

==== Twentieth Century Poetry, an Anthology ====
These poets were chosen by Harold Monro for the 1933 edition:

- Lascelles Abercrombie
- Richard Aldington
- John Alford
- A. C. Benson
- Laurence Binyon
- Edmund Blunden
- W. S. Blunt
- Gordon Bottomley
- Robert Bridges
- Rupert Brooke
- Samuel Butler
- Roy Campbell
- G. K. Chesterton
- Richard Church
- Padraic Colum
- A. E. Coppard
- Frances Cornford
- John Davidson
- W. H. Davies
- Jeffery Day
- Walter de la Mare
- Lord Alfred Douglas
- John Drinkwater
- Helen Parry Eden
- T. S. Eliot
- Vivian Locke Ellis
- Michael Field
- J. E. Flecker
- F. S. Flint
- John Freeman
- Stella Gibbons
- Wilfrid Gibson
- Robert Graves
- Thomas Hardy
- H. D. (Hilda Doolittle)
- Philip Henderson
- Maurice Hewlett
- Ralph Hodgson
- Gerard Manley Hopkins
- A. E. Housman
- Ford Hueffer
- T. E. Hulme
- Aldous Huxley
- James Joyce
- Rudyard Kipling
- D. H. Lawrence
- Cecil Day-Lewis
- John Masefield
- R. A. K. Mason
- Charlotte Mew
- Alice Meynell
- Viola Meynell
- Harold Monro
- T. Sturge Moore
- Edwin Muir
- Henry Newbolt
- Robert Nichols
- Alfred Noyes
- Wilfred Owen
- J. D. C. Pellow
- H. D. C. Pepler
- Eden Phillpotts
- Ezra Pound
- Peter Quennell
- Herbert Read
- Isaac Rosenberg
- Siegfried Sassoon
- Geoffrey Scott
- Edward Shanks
- Fredegond Shove
- Edith Sitwell
- Osbert Sitwell
- Sacheverell Sitwell
- Stephen Spender
- J. C. Squire
- James Stephens
- Edward Thomas
- W. J. Turner
- Sylvia Warner
- Max Weber
- Anna Wickham
- Humbert Wolfe
- W. B. Yeats

=== Other in English ===
- Kenneth Slessor, Australia:
  - Darlinghurst Nights: and Morning Glories: Being 47 Strange Sights, Sydney
  - Funny Farmyard: Nursery Rhymes and Painting Book, with drawings by Sydney Miller, Sydney: Frank Johnson
- Allen Curnow, Valley of Decision (R.W. Lowry), New Zealand
- William Butler Yeats, The Winding Stair and Other Poems, Irish poet published in the United Kingdom

== Works published in other languages ==
=== France ===
- Robert Desnos, Complainte de Fantomas, written for radio
- Jean Follain, La Main chaude, the author's first book of poems
- Pierre Jean Jouve, Sueurs de sang
- Henri Michaux, Un Barbare en Asie
- Marcelin Pleynet, French poet and art critic
- Patrice de La Tour du Pin, La Quête de Joie
- Raymond Queneau, Le Chiendent, a "novel-poem" which won the 1933 Prix des Deux-Magots

=== Indian subcontinent ===
Including all of the British colonies that later became India, Pakistan, Bangladesh, Sri Lanka and Nepal. Listed alphabetically by first name, regardless of surname:

- Anandra Chandra Barua:
  - Parag, Assamese
  - translator, Haphejar Sur, poems by the Persian poet Havij into Assamese
- G. Sankara Kurup, Surykanti, Malayalam, including poems on mystic experiences and platonic love, written in a style strongly influenced by Rabindranath Tagore and Persian poets
- Ghulam Ahmad Fazil Kashmiri, Tarana-e-Fazil, Kashmiri
- Mahavira Prasad Dvivedi Abhinandran Granth, by several authors; an early Hindi example of festschrift honoring an influential editor and arbiter of taste and usage
- Mu. Raghava Ayyankar, Nallicaippulamai Mellryalarkal, largely based on literary sources, an essay on the women poets of the Sangam Age of Tamil literature
- Puttaparthi Narayanacharyulu, Penukonda Lakshmi, said to have been written in 1926 when the author was 12 years old; the poem describes Penukonda, Anantapur, a small town that was once capital of the Vijayanagar empire; Telugu
- Shripada Shastri Hauskar, Sri Sikhaguru-caritamrta, Sanskrit poem on the Sikh gurus
- Sundaram, writing in Gujarati:
  - Bhagatni Kadvi Vani
  - Kavyamangala
- V. Venkatarajuly Reddiyar, Paranar, a study of Paranar's poems and their relationship to the Sangam Age; Tamil

=== Spanish language ===
- Pedro Salinas, La voz a ti debida ("The Voice Owed to You"); Spain
- Emilio Vasquez, Altipampa, Peru
- Emilio Adolfo von Westphalen, Las ínsulas extrañas, Peru

=== Urdu language ===
- Mehr Lal Soni Zia Fatehabadi, Tullu (The Dawn), collection of poems of Zia Fatehabadi published by Saghar Nizami, Adabi Markaz, Meerut, India.

=== Other languages ===
- Mascha Kaléko, Das Lyrische Stenogrammheft: Verse vom Alltag, Germany
- Nis Petersen, En Drift Vers ("A Drove of Verses"), including "Brændende Europa" ("Europe Aflame"), Denmark
- J. Slauerhoff, Soleares, Netherlands
- A Flower Tree by Yi Sang, Korea
- Georg Trakl, Gesang des Abgeschiedenen ("Song of The Departed"); an Austrian native's work published in Germany

== Awards and honors ==
- Guggenheim Fellowship: E.E. Cummings
- Pulitzer Prize for Poetry: Archibald MacLeish: Conquistador

== Births ==
Death years link to the corresponding "[year] in poetry" article:

- January 3 – Anne Stevenson (died 2020), American-British poet
- January 7 – Soltan Abbas (died 2025), Azerbaijani poet
- January 16 – Ivan Chtcheglov (died 1998), French political theorist, activist and poet
- January 25 – Alden Nowlan, (died 1983), Canadian poet
- February 5 – B. S. Johnson (Bryan Stanley Johnson; died 1973), English experimental novelist, poet, literary critic and filmmaker
- February 14 – James Simmons (died 2001), Northern Ireland poet, literary critic and songwriter
- February 23 – Donna J. Stone née von Schoenweiler (died 1994), American poet and philanthropist, author of Wielder of Words
- February 24 – Peter Scupham, English
- February 27 – Edward Lucie-Smith, Jamaican-born British poet and art critic
- April 2 – Konstantin Pavlov (died 2008), Bulgarian poet and screenwriter who was defiant against his country's communist regime; when censors prevented his works from being published officially in the country from 1966 to 1976, his popularity didn't wane, as Bulgarians clandestinely copied and read his poems
- April 29 – Rod McKuen (died 2015), American poet and songwriter
- May 12 – Andrei Voznesensky (died 2010), Russian
- June 21 – Gerald William Barrax (died 2019), African-American
- July 18 – Kevin Ireland, New Zealand
- August 1 or April 11 – Ko Un, born Ko Untae, South Korea
- August 16 – Reiner Kunze, German
- September 11 – Robert Fagles (died 2008), American professor, poet and academic, best known for his many translations of ancient Greek Literature
- October 21 – Maureen Duffy (died 2026), British poet, playwright and novelist
- November 13 – Peter Härtling (died 2017), German novelist and poet
- December 23 – Akihito, Emperor of Japan and poet
- December 26 – Joe Rosenblatt (died 2019), Canada
- Also – Robert Sward, Canadian and American poet, novelist and writer

== Deaths ==
Death years link to the corresponding "[year] in poetry" article:

- January 21 – George Moore (born 1852), Irish poet and novelist
- January 29 – Sara Teasdale (born 1884), American lyric poet
- March 1 – Uładzimir Žyłka (born 1900), Belarusian poet
- April 16 – Henry van Dyke Jr. (born 1852), American poet, author, educator and clergyman
- April 29 – Constantine P. Cavafy (born 1863), Greek Alexandrine poet
- September 21 – Kenji Miyazawa 宮沢 賢治 (born 1896), early Shōwa period Japanese poet and author of children's literature (surname: Miyazawa)
- November 4 – John Jay Chapman (born 1862), American essayist, poet, author and lawyer
- December 4 – Stefan George (born 1868), German poet and translator

== See also ==
- Poetry
- List of poetry awards
- List of years in poetry
