= Harold Monro =

English poet, critic and bookseller

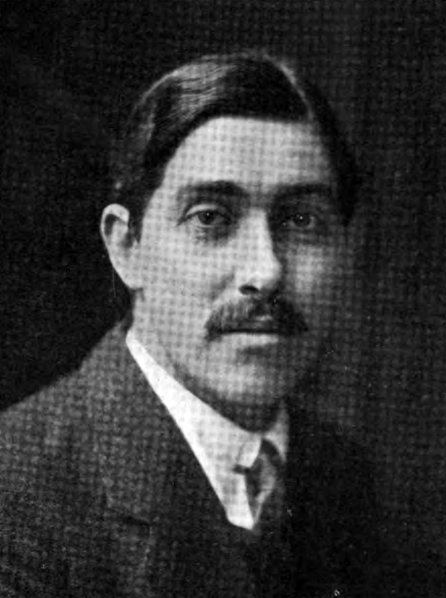
- Monro in about 1919
- Born: March 14, 1879; London, England
- Died: March 16, 1932 (aged 53); London, England
- Occupations: Poet, publisher
- Writing career
- Notable works: Children of Love, Strange Meetings, Poems New and Old
- Movement: Georgian poetry

Harold Edward Monro (14 March 1879 – 16 March 1932) was an English poet born in Brussels, Belgium. As the proprietor of the Poetry Bookshop in London, he helped many poets to bring their work before the public.

== Life and career ==
Monro was born at 137 Chaussée de Charleroi, Saint-Gilles/St Gillis, Brussels, on 14 March 1879, as the youngest of three surviving children of Edward William Monro (1848–1889), civil engineer, and his wife and first cousin, Arabel Sophia (1849–1926), daughter of Peter John Margary, also a civil engineer. Monro's father was born at Marylebone and died aged 41 when Monro was only nine years old. The Monro family was well established in Bloomsbury. His paternal grandfather, Dr Henry Munro FRCP MD, was a surgeon, born at Gower St, Bloomsbury, in 1817.

Monro was educated at Radley College and Gonville and Caius College, Cambridge. His first collection of poetry was published in 1906. He also edited a poetry magazine, The Poetry Review, which became influential. In 1913, he founded the Poetry Bookshop at 35 Devonshire Street in Bloomsbury, where he published new collections at his own expense and sometimes made a profit, while providing a welcoming environment for readers and poets. Several poets, including Wilfrid Wilson Gibson, lodged in the rooms above the shop. Monro and the Poetry Bookshop were also involved with Edward Marsh in publishing the Georgian Poetry series.

Monro also founded and edited Poetry and Drama. Between 1910 and 1914, Filippo Tommaso Marinetti, who had established Italian Futurism with the publication of the first Futurist manifesto in 1909, gave readings and lectures in London with a view to establishing an English Futurism. Initially, he had an ally in Monro, who devoted the September 1913 issue of Poetry and Drama to Futurism, praising Marinetti in a long editorial. Marinetti's campaign both threatened and influenced Ezra Pound, who founded his own literary movement, Imagism, and wrote manifestos to publicize it while attacking Futurism. Vorticism was the second London literary movement both opposing and reflecting Marinetti's, with Pound as a major collaborator.

== War and peace ==
Monro wrote few war poems himself, but his "Youth in Arms" quartet, written in the early months of the First World War, is one of the first attempts to envisage the "human psychology" of soldiering and understand "how ungrudgingly Youth dies." These poems were inspired by Monro's fears for his friend, Basil Watt, whom he dearly loved and who was later killed at Loos. Monro's elegy for Watt, "Lament in 1915", is a monologue in unornamented, modern language.

Happy boy, happy boy,
David the immortal-willed,
Youth a thousand thousand times Slain, but not once killed,
Swaggering again today
In the old contemptuous way;

Leaning backward from your thigh
Up against the tinselled bar —
Dust and ashes! is it you?
Laughing, boasting, there you are!
First we hardly recognized you
In your modern avatar.

Soldier, rifle, brown khaki —
Is your blood as happy so?
Where's your sling or painted shield, Helmet, pike or bow?
Well, you're going to the wars —
That is all you need to know.

Graybeards plotted. They were sad.
Death was in their wrinkled eyes.
At their tables—with their maps,
Plans and calculations—wise
They all seemed; for well they knew
How ungrudgingly Youth dies.

At their green official baize
They debated all the night
Plans for your adventurous days
Which you followed with delight,
Youth in all your wanderings,
David of a thousand slings.

After the war, Monro wrote his somewhat trenchant overview Some Contemporary Poets (1920), though this was not published by the Poetry Bookshop. He also founded The Chapbook (1919–1925, his third journal after The Poetry Review and Poetry and Drama, 1913–1914), which was not commercially viable, but contained some of his best work as a poet. His intention was to find "cultural middle ground" between modernism and the more traditional work exemplified by the Georgians. In this Monro took a broad view of the sphere of poetry, devoting whole numbers to children's rhymes and to songs by Walter de la Mare complete with scores.

== Marriages ==
The young Monro was raised together with his sister Mary (died 1921) by their widowed mother, who remarried in 1910 to Sir Daniel Fulthorpe Gooch (1829–1926). Monro's stepbrother Lancelot Daniel Edward Gooch, a midshipman on HMS Implacable, died a fortnight after his 18th birthday in Greece, on 4 October 1915. On 2 December 1903 in Eastbourne, Monro married Dorothy Elizabeth Browne. Their son Nigel Monro (1904–1951) was born in Ireland, where Harold was working as a land agent for a family friend. However, the marriage was not to last and in 1908, the couple separated. The son followed Monro family medical tradition and practised as a surgeon.

In March 1913 Monro met Alida Klemantaski, 17 years his junior, from Hampstead, who also had a passion for poetry and had set herself goals of becoming a doctor or rescuing prostitutes from their predicament. Monro instead persuaded her that by working in the Poetry Bookshop, she would be achieving just as much for society. They were married in 1920. Alida's brother Louis Klemantaski, a promising young poet and musical editor died at the Somme in 1916. It is said that Alida had a greater influence than anyone on the development of Monro's own poetry.

== Disappointment ==
In his later years, Monro reflected on whether the Poetry Bookshop had fulfilled its purpose and whether it should be closed, but he was too deeply attached to it. According to the English literary historian Dominic Hibberd, "By now Monro was a disappointed man, appalled at the state of Europe and feeling forgotten by the poets he had helped." He had used up most of his money subsidising the shop.

On top of a drinking problem, Monro contracted tuberculosis. He died on 16 March 1932, aged 53, at the Cliff Combe Nursing Home, Broadstairs, Kent, and was cremated at Golders Green Crematorium on the 19th. He was remembered as being liberal-minded and without literary prejudices. "Perhaps no one did more for the advancement of twentieth-century poetry."

== To what God? ==
On Monday, 4 August 2014, a service was held at Westminster Abbey as "A Solemn Commemoration on the Centenary of the Outbreak of the First World War", HRH Camilla, Duchess of Cornwall, representing HM the Queen. After a reading from St John's Gospel, the choir gave the first performance of a new composition by David Matthews, a pupil of Benjamin Britten, setting a bitter, disillusioned 1914 poem by Harold Monro, "To what God shall we chant our songs of battle?" alongside passages from Lamentations and St Luke. James O'Donnell, Abbey organist and master of the choristers, commented that the work "leaves you standing on the edge of an abyss."

To what God
Shall we chant
Our songs of Battle?
Oh, to whom shall a song of battle be chanted?
Not to our lord of the hosts on his ancient throne,
Drowsing the ages out in Heaven alone.
The celestial choirs are mute, the angels have fled:
Word is gone forth abroad that our lord is dead.
Is it nothing to you, all you that pass by?
Behold and see if there be any sorrow like unto my sorrow.

To what God
Shall we chant
Our songs of Battle?
Oh, to whom shall a song of battle be chanted?
If you had only recognised on this day the things that make for peace!
But now they are hidden from your eyes.
Oh, to whom shall a song of battle be chanted?

== Anthologized poets ==
Poets included in Twentieth Century Poetry, an anthology chosen by Harold Monro, 1933 edition:

Lascelles Abercrombie, Richard Aldington, John Alford, A. C. Benson, Laurence Binyon, Edmund Blunden, W. S. Blunt, Gordon Bottomley, Robert Bridges, Rupert Brooke, Samuel "Erewhon" Butler, Roy Campbell, G. K. Chesterton, Richard Church, Padraic Colum, A. E. Coppard, Frances Cornford, John Davidson, W. H. Davies, Jeffery Day, Walter de la Mare, Lord Alfred Douglas, John Drinkwater, Helen Parry Eden, T. S. Eliot, Vivian Locke Ellis, Michael Field, J. E. Flecker, F. S. Flint, John Freeman, Stella Gibbons, Wilfrid Gibson, Robert Graves, Thomas Hardy, H. D., Philip Henderson, Maurice Hewlett, Ralph Hodgson, Gerard Manley Hopkins, A. E. Housman, Ford Madox Hueffer, T. E. Hulme, Aldous Huxley, James Joyce, Rudyard Kipling, D. H. Lawrence, Cecil Day-Lewis, John Masefield, R. A. K. Mason, Charlotte Mew, Alice Meynell, Viola Meynell, Harold Monro, T. Sturge Moore, Edwin Muir, Henry Newbolt, Robert Nichols, Alfred Noyes, Wilfred Owen, J. D. C. Pellow, H. D. C. Pepler, Eden Phillpotts, Ezra Pound, Peter Quennell, Herbert Read, Isaac Rosenberg, Siegfried Sassoon, Geoffrey Scott, Edward Shanks, Fredegond Shove, Edith Sitwell, Osbert Sitwell, Sacheverell Sitwell, Stephen Spender, J. C. Squire, James Stephens, Edward Thomas, W. J. Turner, Sylvia Townsend Warner, Max Weber, Anna Wickham, Humbert Wolfe, William Butler Yeats

== Poetry collections ==
- Poems (Elkin Mathews, 1906)
- Chronicle of a Pilgrimage (1909)
- Before Dawn: Poems and Impressions (1911)
- Children of Love (1915)
- Strange Meetings (1917)
- Real Property (1922)
- The Earth for Sale (1928)
- The Silent Pool and other poems (Faber & Faber, 1942)
- Collected Poems (ed. Alida Monro, Gerald Duckworth & Co Ltd, 1970)
