= Dymock poets =

Literary group of the early 20th century

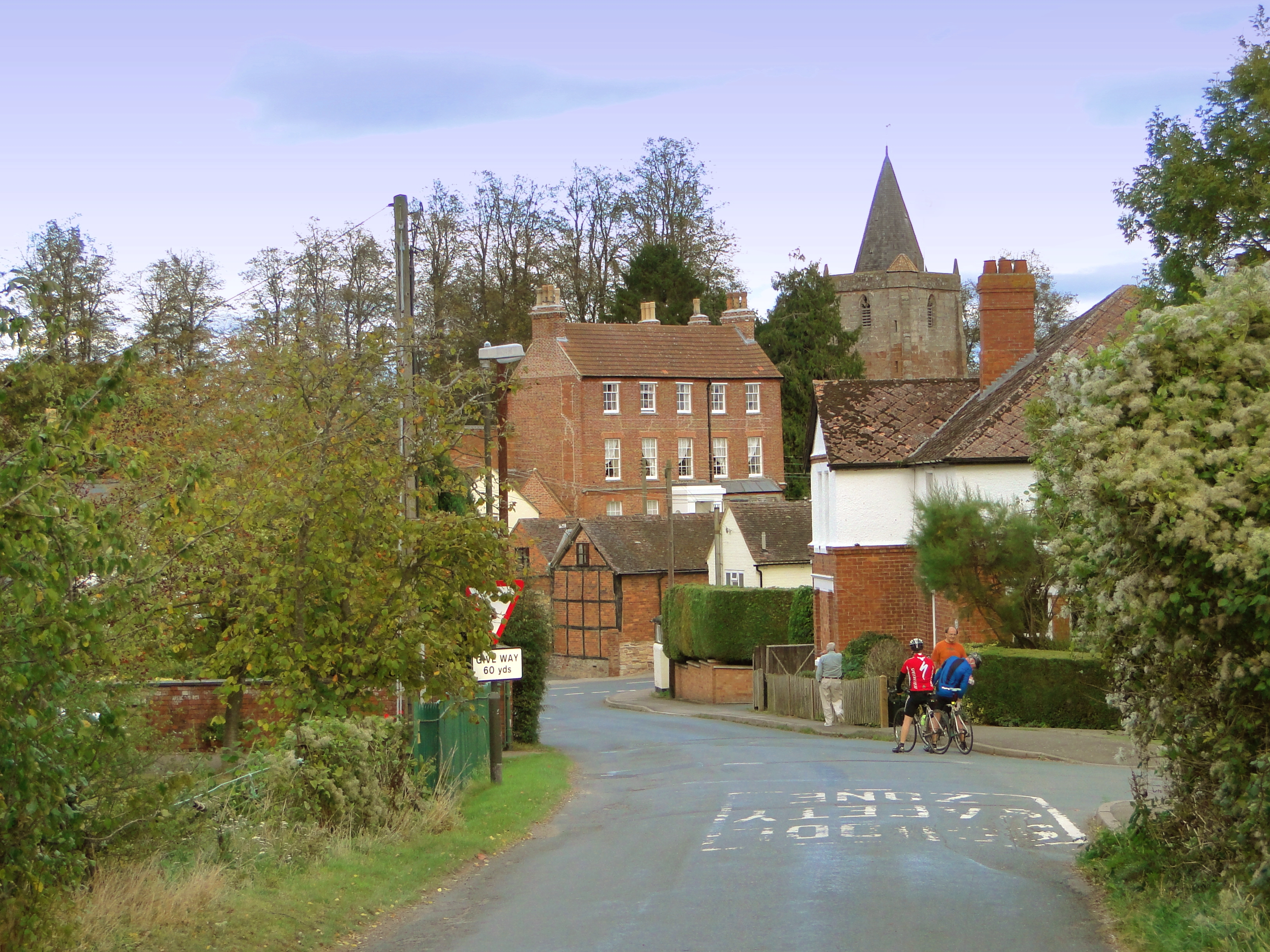
Dymock village centre, 2011

The Dymock poets were a literary group of the early 20th century who made their homes near the village of Dymock in Gloucestershire, in England, near to the border with Herefordshire.

== Significant figures and events ==
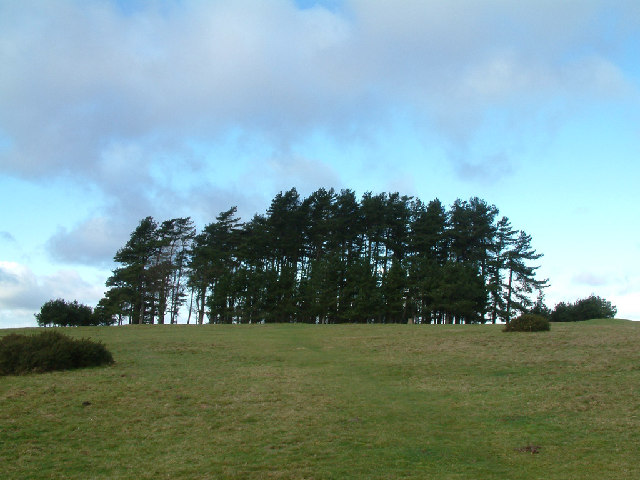
Clump of Corsican pine trees on May Hill – Robert Frost and Edward Thomas walked here, and Frost and his wife could see it from their cottage, "Little Iddens". It was here that Thomas began writing his poem "Words".

The 'Dymock Poets' are generally held to have comprised Robert Frost, Lascelles Abercrombie, Rupert Brooke, Edward Thomas, Wilfrid Wilson Gibson and John Drinkwater, some of whom lived near the village in the period between 1911 and 1914. Eleanor Farjeon, who was involved with Edward Thomas, also visited. The group published their own quarterly, titled New Numbers, containing poems such as Brooke's "The Soldier", published in 1915. Abercrombie was the first to establish himself in the area arriving at the "Gallows" in Ryton in 1911. He was followed by the Gibson arriving in 1914 at The Old Nailshop Greenway Cross. Frost and his family followed moving into Little Iddens also in 1914. The others were visitors.

During the First World War Edward Thomas joined the army, on 19 July 1915, with the initial rank of private. After two years he was promoted to second lieutenant but shortly after, on 9 April 1917, at the age of thirty- eight, he was killed in the British offensive at Arras by the blast of a shell. The death of Thomas saw the break-up of the community.

Abercrombie, Brooke, Drinkwater and Gibson were poets who had contributed to The Westminster Gazette and were considered Georgian poets. The 'Georgian' style, particularly its versification, fell out of favour in the 1920s and 1930s, but at the time was considered 'advanced', and a precursor of 'modernism'. It used simple language and took as its subjects ordinary events and people. Abercrombie died in 1938 while Gibson lived on until 1962. Edward Marsh, the group's artistic and literary patron, edited the five volumes of Georgian Poetry which were published by Harold Monro.

Drinkwater had close connections with the Birmingham Repertory Theatre at the Old Rep in Station Street, which opened in 1913. He was its first manager, and wrote several plays for the company, mainly historical pieces and light comedies. Robert Frost, who became the most successful of the men, returned to America on 13 February 1915. During his career as a poet he received four Pulitzer Prizes and was honoured twice by the Senate. During the presidential inauguration of John F. Kennedy, Frost recited his poem "The Gift Outright", the first time that a poet had been so honoured during an inauguration.

== See also ==
- 1911 in poetry
- 1912 in poetry
- 1913 in poetry
- 1914 in poetry
