= Thomas Kelly Cheyne =

English divine and biblical critic

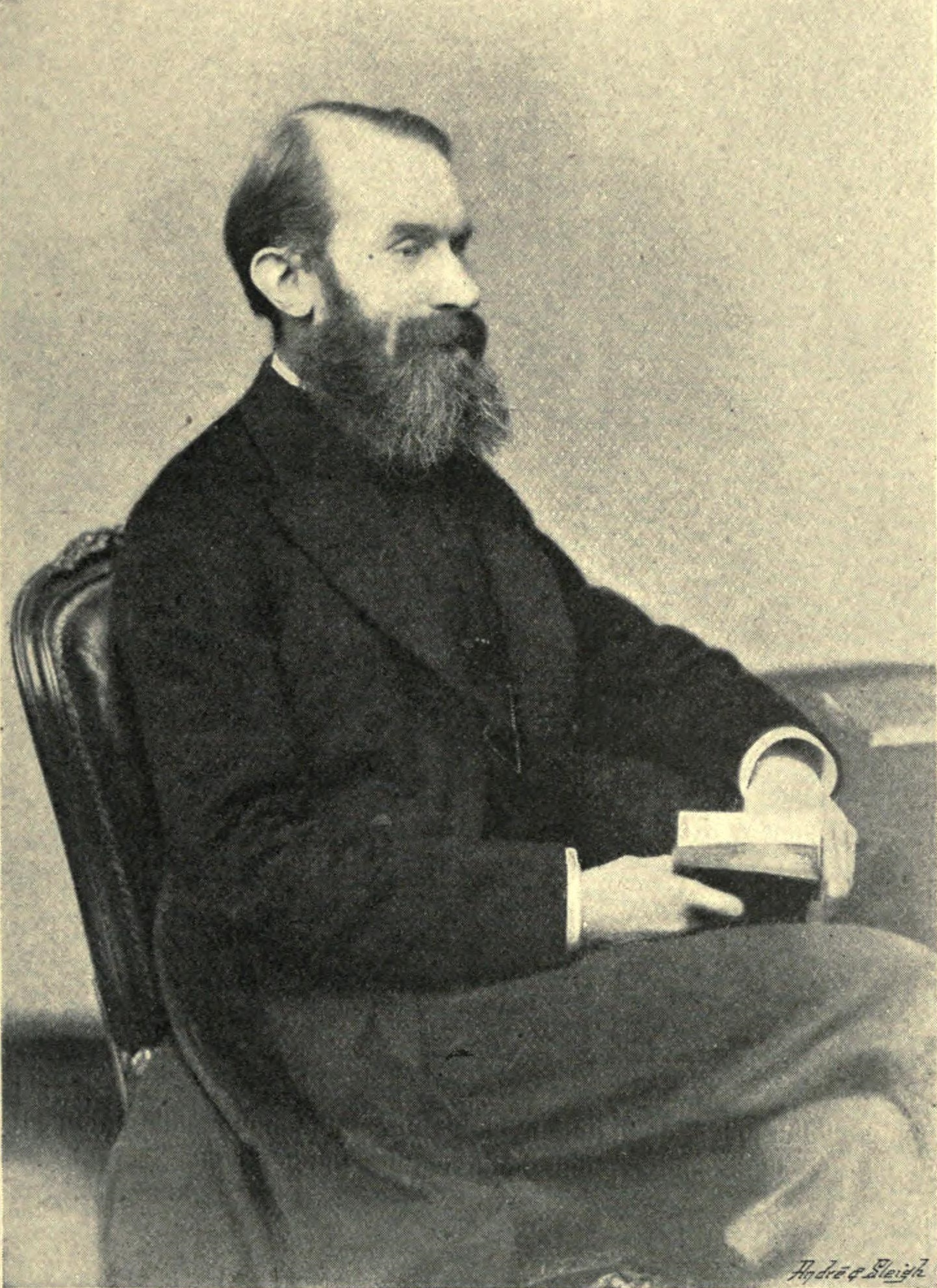
Thomas Kelly Cheyne

Thomas Kelly Cheyne (18 September 1841 – 1915) was an English divine and biblical critic.

== Biography ==
He was born in London and educated at Merchant Taylors' School, London, and Oxford University. Subsequently, he studied German theological methods at Göttingen. He was ordained in 1864 and held a fellowship at Balliol College, Oxford, from 1868 to 1882. During the earlier part of this period he stood alone in the university as a teacher of the main conclusions of Old Testament criticism at that time. In 1881 he was presented to the rectory of Tendring, in Essex, and in 1884 he was made a member of the Old Testament revision company. He resigned the living of Tendring in 1885 on his appointment to be Oriel Professor of the Interpretation of Holy Scripture, which carried with it a canonry at Rochester. In 1889 he delivered the Bampton lectures at Oxford. In 1908 he resigned his professorship.

In June 1901, he received an honorary doctorate of Divinity from the University of Glasgow, and in March 1902 he was awarded the degree Doctor of Letters (D.Litt.) from the University of Oxford.

In 1882 he married Frances Godfrey and she died in 1907. Cheyne wrote a glowing a review of the work published by Elizabeth Gibson in 1911. The review was in the progressive Christian Commonwealth. Gibson had published about twenty books of poetry or prose and she was an established writer. Their common interest fueled a whirlwind romance that resulted in their marriage in the Cornish village of Mawnan in Cornwall on 28 August 1911. Afterwards She joined Cheyne at his home in Oxford.

He consistently urged in his writings the necessity of a broad and comprehensive study of the Scriptures in the light of literary, historical and scientific considerations. His publications include commentaries on the Prophets and Hagiographa, as well as lectures and addresses on theological subjects. He was a joint editor of the Encyclopaedia Biblica (London, 1899-1903), a work embodying the more advanced conclusions of English biblical criticism. In the introduction to his Origin of the Psalter (London, 1891) he gave an account of his development as a critical scholar. His publications include translations, commentaries, and supplemental research.

He became a member of the Baháʼí Faith by 1912. "If there has been any Prophet in recent times", he wrote in his 1914 work The Reconciliation of Races and Religions, "it is to Bahá'u'lláh that we must go. Character is the final judge. Bahá'u'lláh was a man of the highest class – that of Prophets."

His second wife's 1912 book The Voice of One Crying was "arranged in cycles by T. K. C. i.e. Thomas Kelly Cheyne".

== Publications ==
=== Books ===
In his lifetime Cheyne published over a dozen volumes.

- The Relations Between Civilized and Uncivilized Races: A Prize Essay Read in the Theatre, Oxford was perhaps his first publication in 1864.
- Encyclopaedia Biblica, co-edited with J. Sutherland Black in 1903, revised 1907, is still widely cited.
- The Reconciliation of Races and Religions may have been his last publication, August 1914, by A. and C. Black, and has been reprinted as late as 2004 (as ISBN 1-4142-1939-3,)
- Founders of Old Testament Criticism: Biographical, Descriptive, and Critical Studies - Wipf and Stock 9781592443789
- Job and Solomon: Or the Wisdom of the Old Testament - Wipf and Stock 9781597521512
- The Mines of Isaiah Re-explored - Wipf and Stock 9781597521550
- Introduction to the Book of Isaiah - Wipf and Stock 9781592449095
- The Origin and Religious Contents of The Psalter: In the Light of Old Testament Criticism and the History of Religions - Wipf and Stock 9781606082577
- Aids to the Devout Study of Criticism: Part I: The David Narrative, Part II: The Book of Psalms - Wipf and Stock 9781606085004
- Traditions & Beliefs of Ancient Israel (1907) - Various reprints

=== Articles ===
Several articles in the Encyclopædia Britannica, 9th edition (1875–89) and 10th edition (1902-03), including on Circumcision, Deluge and Hittites.
