= J. D. C. Pellow =

John Dynham Cornish Pellow MBE (1890–1960) was an English poet and civil servant. Pellow was one of the Georgian Poets.

== Life ==
Pellow was born in London, where his father, William Pellow, was a civil servant. He wrote poetry throughout his life.

Professionally, Pellow followed in his father's footsteps and joined the National Health Insurance Commission in 1908. In 1913, he was promoted, and eventually reached the rank of Senior Executive Officer. On his retirement in 1950, he was awarded an MBE.

== Poetry ==
Poems by Pellow were included in the fourth and fifth anthologies of Georgian Poetry, for 1918–1919 and 1920–1922, edited by Sir Edward Marsh and also in several later anthologies:

- Thomas Caldwell (1922), The Golden Book of Modern English Poetry
- J. C. Squire (1927), Selections from Modern Poets Complete Edition
- J. C. Squire (1932), Younger Poets of To-day
- Eric Gillett (1932), Poets of Our Time
- Harold Monro (1933), Twentieth Century Poetry
- The Golden Treasury, with additional poems (1941), Oxford University Press
- Selected Poems (Staples Press, 1945) with George Every, S. L. Bethell

== See also ==
- Georgian Poetry
