= John Drinkwater (playwright) =

British writer (1882–1937)

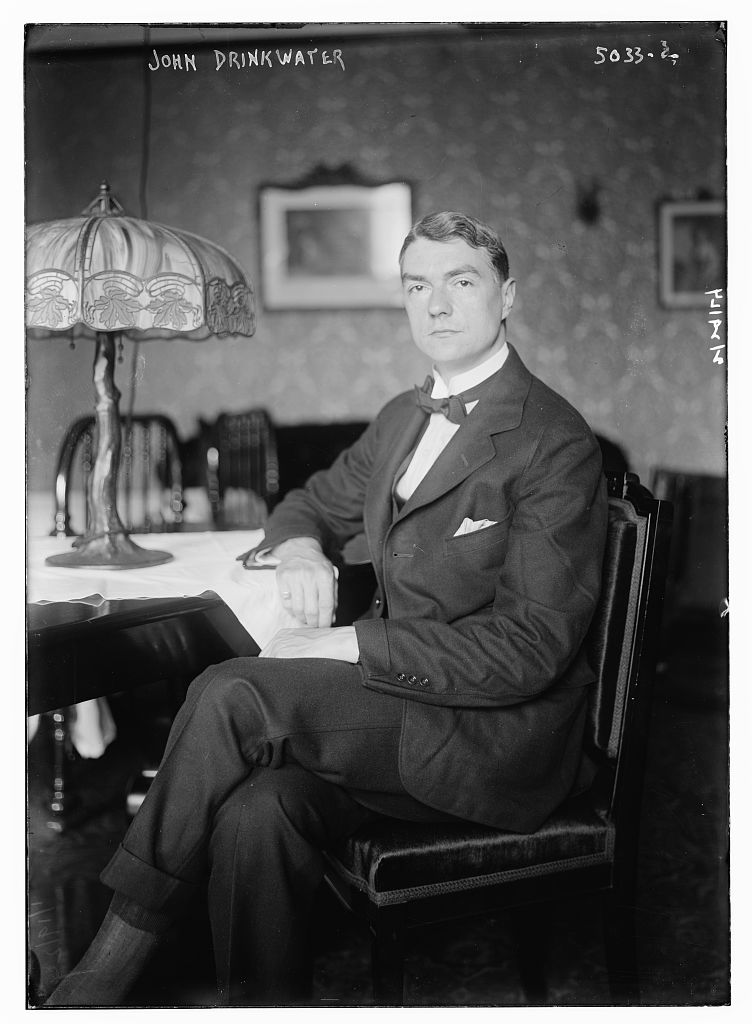
- John Drinkwater in 1919.
- Born: 1 June 1882; Leytonstone, Essex, England
- Died: 25 March 1937 (aged 54); London, England
- Spouse(s): Cathleen Orford (née Kathleen Walpole); Daisy Kennedy
- Children: 1

John Drinkwater (1 June 1882 – 25 March 1937) was an English poet and dramatist. He was known before World War 1 (also known as the Great War or WW1) as one of the Dymock poets, and his poetry was included in all five volumes of Georgian Poetry (edited by Edward Marsh, 1912–1922). After World War I, he achieved fame as a playwright and became closely associated with Birmingham Repertory Theatre.

== Life and career ==
John Drinkwater was born in Leytonstone, Essex (now Greater London), to actor/author Albert Edwin Drinkwater (1851–1923) and Annie Beck (née Brown), and worked as an insurance clerk. In the period immediately before the First World War, he was one of the group of poets associated with the Gloucestershire village of Dymock, along with Rupert Brooke, Lascelles Abercrombie, Wilfrid Wilson Gibson and others.

In 1918, he had his first major success with his play Abraham Lincoln. He followed it with others in a similar vein, including Mary Stuart and Oliver Cromwell. In 1927, the George H. Doran Company published Drinkwater's book Oliver Cromwell: A Character Study.

He had published poetry since The Death of Leander in 1906; the first volume of his Collected Poems was published in 1923. He did also compile anthologies and wrote literary criticism (e.g. Swinburne: an estimate (1913)), and later became manager of Birmingham Repertory Theatre.

He married concert violinist Daisy Kennedy, the ex-wife of Benno Moiseiwitsch, in December 1924. Their daughter, Penny Drinkwater, went on to become a wine writer and member of the circle of wine writers.

John Drinkwater made recordings in Columbia Records' International Educational Society Lecture series. They include Lecture 10 – a lecture on The Speaking of Verse (four 78 rpm sides, Cat no. D 40018-40019), and Lecture 70 John Drinkwater reading his own poems (four 78 rpm sides, Cat no. D 40140-40141).

== Death and commemoration ==
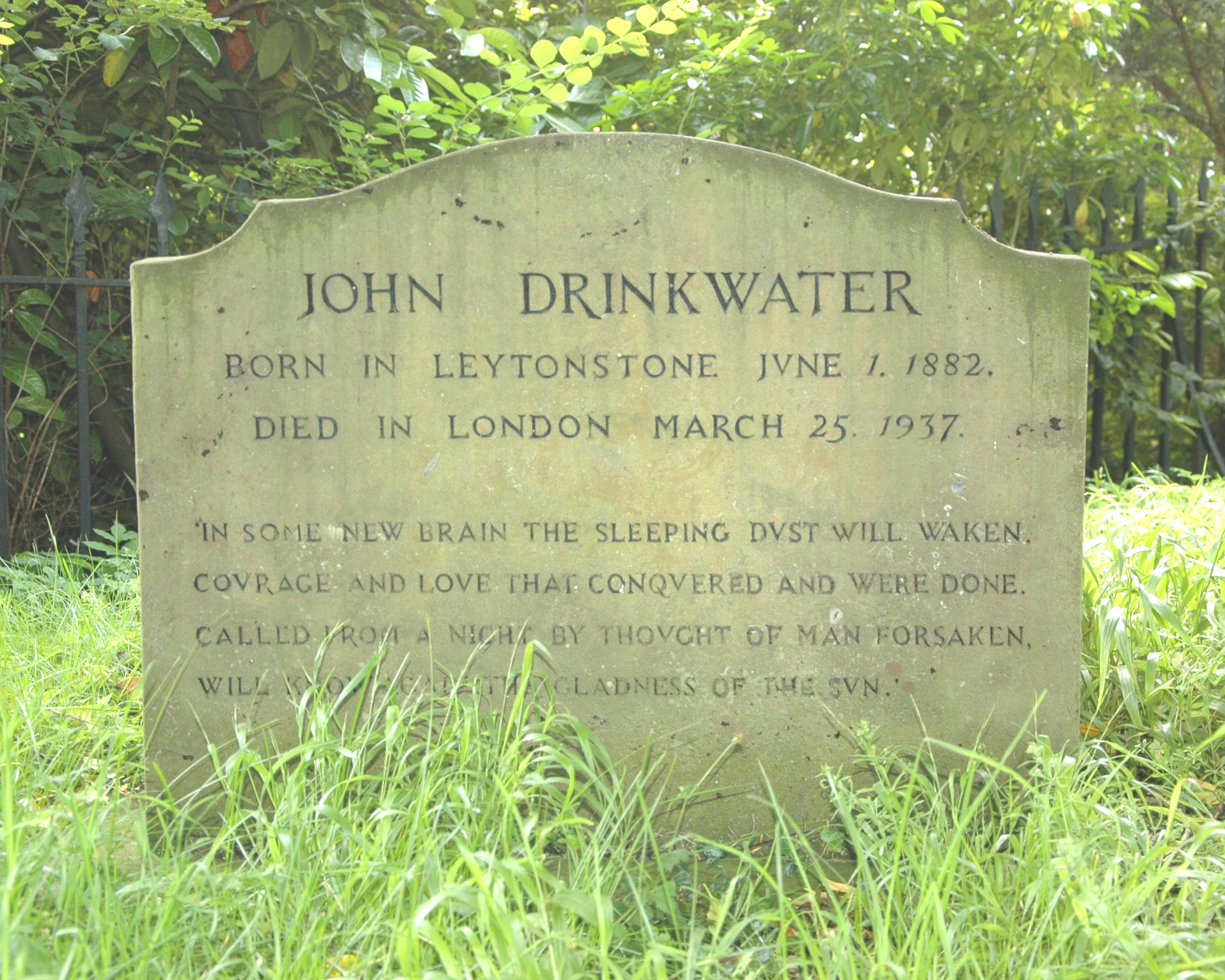
John Drinkwater's grave at Piddington, Oxfordshire.

John Drinkwater died in London in 1937 at the age of 54. He is buried at Piddington, Oxfordshire, where he had spent summer holidays as a child.

A road in Leytonstone, formerly a 1960s council estate, is named after John Drinkwater, as is a small development of modern houses in Piddington.

== Archives ==
Papers of John Drinkwater are held at the Cadbury Research Library, University of Birmingham. This includes a collection of photographs and photograph albums relating to Drinkwater. There are also some Drinkwater papers in the Ashley Library in the British Library and in Vestry House Museum in Walthamstow, as well as a large amount of correspondence held at Yale University.

== Works ==
=== Poetry collections ===
- Poems (1903)
- Death of Leander and Other Poems (1906)
- Lyrical and Other Poems (1908)
- Poems of Men and Hours (1911)
- Poems of Love and Earth (1912)
- Cromwell and Other Poems (1913)
- Swords and ploughshares (1916)
- Olton Pools (1916)
- Tides (1917)
- Poems, 1908–1914 (1918)
- Seeds of Time (1921)
- Selected Poems of John Drinkwater (1922)
- Collected Poems (1923)
- Summer Harvest: Poems 1924–1933 (1933)

=== Plays ===
- Cophetua (1911)
- The Death of Leander (1911)
- Rebellion (1914)
- The Storm: A Play in One Act (1915)
- X = 0: A Night of the Trojan War (1917)
- Abraham Lincoln (1918)
- Loyalties (1918)
- Pawns: Three Poetic Plays (1919)
- Mary Stuart (1921)
- Oliver Cromwell (1921)
- Robert E. Lee (1923)
- Bird in Hand (1927)
- The Man Who Lost His Head (1929)
- A Man's House (1934)
- Garibaldi (1936)

=== Novels ===
- The King's Revels (1911)
- The Prince of Orange (1930)
- Robinson of England (1937)

=== Biography and historical studies ===
- William Morris: A Critical Study (1912)
- Swinburne: An Estimate (1913)
- Lincoln: The World Emancipator (1920)
- Cromwell: A Character Study (1927)
- Charles James Fox (1928)
- Pepys: His Life and Character (1930)
- The Life and Adventures of Carl Laemmle (1931)
- John Hampden's England (1933)
- Shakespeare (1933)
- The Pilgrim of Eternity: Byron, A Conflict (1935)

=== Literary criticism and essays ===
- The Lyric: An Essay (1915)
- Prose Papers (1917)
- The Muse in Council: Essays on Poets and Poetry (1925)
- The Gentle Art of Theatre-Going (1927)
- Twentieth Century Poetry (1929)
- Poetry and Dogma (1931)
- English Poetry: An Unfinished History (1938)

=== Autobiography ===
- In the Beginning: An Autobiography (1931)
- Discovery: Being the Second Book of an Autobiography (1932)

=== Anthologies edited ===
- The Way of Poetry: An Anthology for Younger Readers (1921)
- An Anthology of English Verse (1924)
- The Outline of Literature (1924) (editor)
- A Book for Bookmen (1926) (editor)
- The Eighteen-Seventies (1929) (editor)
- The Eighteen-Sixties (1932) (editor)
