= J. W. N. Sullivan =

English popular science writer and literary journalist

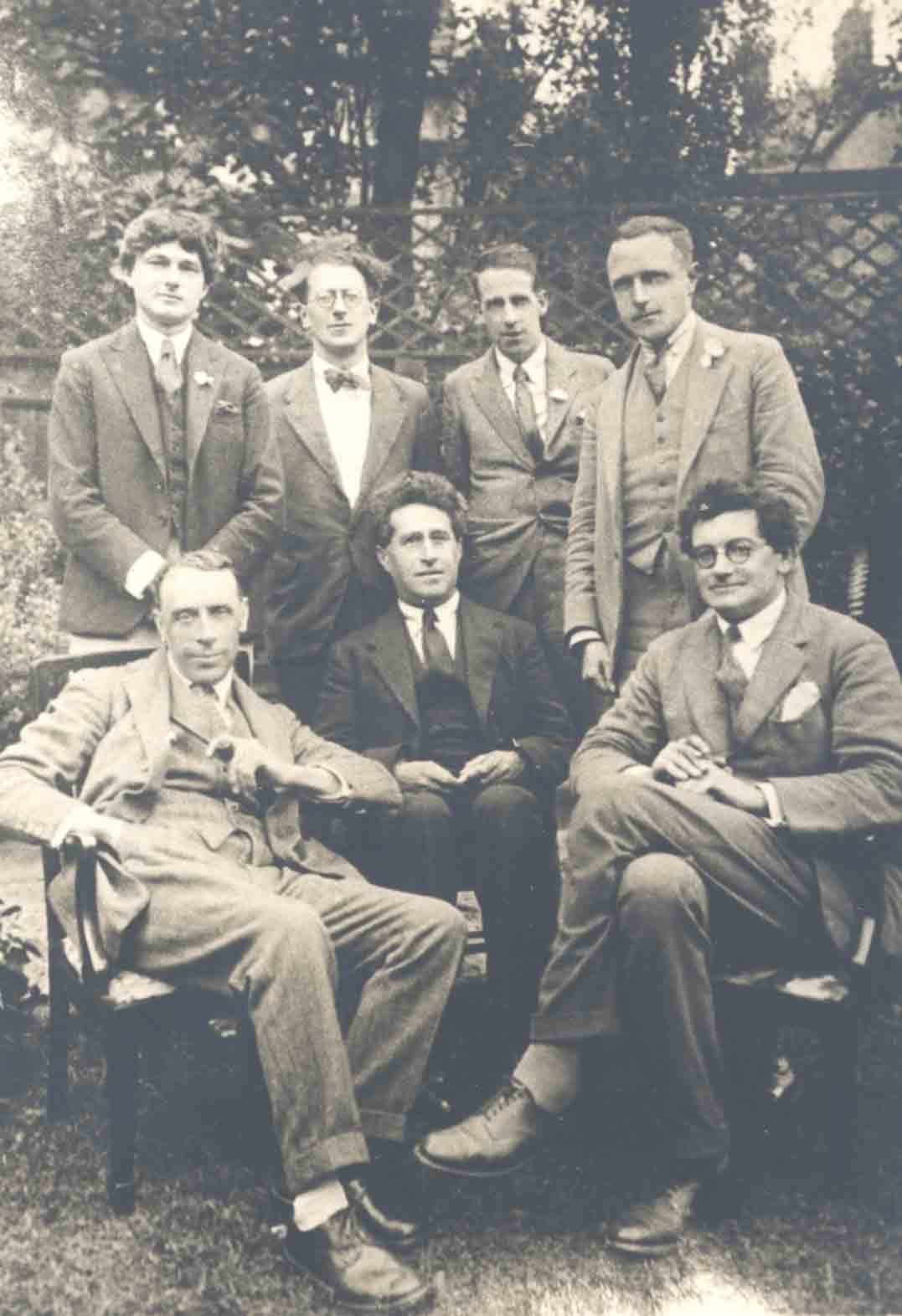
Standing, left to right: Mark Gertler, Hewy Levy, Walter J. Turner, Alan Milne. Seated, left to right: Ralph Hodgson, S. S. Koteliansky and J.W.N. Sullivan (1928)

John William Navin Sullivan (1886–1937) was an English popular science writer and literary journalist, and the author of a study of Beethoven. He wrote some of the earliest non-technical accounts of Albert Einstein's General Theory of Relativity, and was known personally to many important writers in London in the 1920s, including Aldous Huxley, John Middleton Murry, Wyndham Lewis, Aleister Crowley and T. S. Eliot.

== Life and works ==
Sullivan fictionalized his origins, and at one point persuaded Aldous Huxley that he was born in Ireland and had attended Maynooth with James Joyce. In fact he was born on 22 January 1886 in Poplar, in the East End of London, where his father ran a mission to seamen. Facts about his early years are few, but he appears to have left school at a young age and worked from 1900 onwards at a Telegraph company; the directors recognised his outstanding mathematical abilities and paid for him to study part-time at the Northern Polytechnic Institute. By 1907 he and his parents were living at Grosvenor Road, Canonbury, London. From 1908 to 1910 he studied and did research work at University College London, but he left without taking a degree. In 1910, he moved to America, where he worked for an electrical company for a year, before becoming a journalist.

In 1913 he returned to Britain, working as a journalist. Early in the First World War, he worked in the ambulance service in Serbia, and he spent Christmas 1914 in a Serbian war hospital. In May 1915 he resumed his career as a journalist, writing for The New Witness about his Serbian experiences, as well as writing about literature and science. Through the publisher Grant Richards he was recommended to work at "Watergate House", the Department of Information. There he worked with the literary journalist John Middleton Murry, who was to become a close friend and valuable contact over the following years. Late in 1917 he married his first wife, (Violet) Sylvia Mannooch, with whom he had a daughter, Navina, born in November, 1921. Through Murry he was introduced to Ottoline Morrell's salon at Garsington Manor in Oxfordshire, and it was through this network that he became known to many literary figures, including T. S. Eliot and Aldous Huxley.

After the war, Murry took on the editorship of The Athenaeum, and appointed Sullivan as his deputy editor. From April 1919 to February 1921 Sullivan contributed several articles per week on literary and scientific matters, helping to make The Athenaeum one of the most important and influential literary reviews of the 1920s.

Sullivan's mathematical ability (said to be comparable to that of a Senior Wrangler at the University of Cambridge) allowed him to fully understand Einstein's general theory of relativity as few in England were able to do. This enabled him to explain the theory in non-technical language and his articles on Einstein's general theory of relativity in April and May 1919 were among the first to appear in English. He was also quick to recognize the larger philosophical implications of the new spirit in the physical sciences, and to see that the creativity of the physical sciences and their supposed idealistic philosophical basis allowed for reconciliation between the arts and the sciences. Some of his articles on such topics, along with other non-technical scientific articles, were gathered in Aspects of Science (1923) and Aspects of Science: Second Series (1926). He wrote Beethoven: His Spiritual Development, a well received study of the artist, in 1927. Along with other leading figures of the day, he contributed to An Outline of Modern Knowledge (1931).

Sullivan continued to write for the Athenaeum following its incorporation into The Nation in 1921, but also found outlets in other journals and newspapers, including the Times Literary Supplement (TLS), and, from 1923 onwards, Murray's journal The Adelphi. In the late 1920s and early 1930s his main journalistic outlets were more populist journals such as The Outlook, John O’London’s Weekly, and Everyman. He also wrote a number of books, including Beethoven (1927), The Bases of Modern Science (1928), and Limitations of Science (1933). Contemporary Mind (1934) reprinted interviews with contemporary scientists and thinkers that had first appeared in The Observer in 1930–31.

Sullivan separated from his first wife in 1921, and married Vere Bartrick Baker in October, 1928, with whom he had a son, Navin (born in 1929). In the early 1930s he was increasingly troubled by bad health, and in 1934 was diagnosed as suffering from disseminated sclerosis. He died in Chobham, Surrey, on 11 August 1937. In the following year his widow was awarded a Civil List pension.

== In fiction ==
The character Calamy in Aldous Huxley's Those Barren Leaves (1925) may have been partly based on Sullivan.

Sullivan made a posthumous cameo appearance in W.J. Turner's novel The Duchess of Popocatepetl (1939), described there as "gay, romantic, brilliant... a man of powerful mind, capable of sharp penetration, rapid co-ordination, and lucid exposition altogether removed from the ordinary."

Sullivan is a main character in Andrew Crumey's novel Beethoven's Assassins (2023).

== Publications ==
Non-fiction

- Atoms and Electrons (1923)
- The History of Mathematics in Europe (1925)
- Three Men Discuss Relativity (1925)
- Beethoven: His Spiritual Development (1927)
- The Bases of Modern Science (1928)
- How Things Behave: A Child's Introduction to Physics (1932)
- The Physical Nature of the Universe (1932)
- Limitations of Science (1933)
- Contemporary Mind: Some Modern Answers (1934)
- Outline of Modern Belief: Modern Science, Modern Thought, Religious Thought (1934) [with Walter Grierson]
- Science: A New Outline (1935)
- Living Things (1938)

Novels

- An Attempt at Life (1917)
- But for the Grace of God (1932)
- A Holiday Task (1936)
