= Adolf Kamphausen =

German Protestant theologian

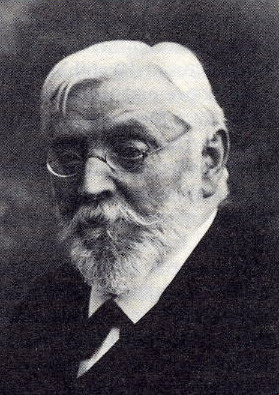
Adolf Kamphausen

Adolf Kamphausen (10 September 1829 – 13 September 1909, in Bonn) was a German Protestant theologian. He was known for his liberal views in regard to Biblical exegesis.

He was born in Solingen and educated at the University of Bonn. In 1855, as private secretary to Bunsen, he assisted him in his great Völlstandiges Bibelwerk für die Gemeinde. At the same time he was privatdocent at Heidelberg, and in 1863 he became an associate professor of theology at Bonn. In 1868 he attained a full professorship, serving as university rector in 1893/94.

He was especially prominent in the revision of Luther's version of the Bible. Also, he edited Friedrich Bleek's Einleitung in das Alte Testament, a book that was translated into English as "An introduction to the Old Testament" (1869; translated from the second edition by G.H. Venables). Principal writings by Kamphausen include:

- Das Lied Moses (1862).
- Die Hagiographen des alten Bundes übersetzt (1868).
- Das Buch Daniel und die neuere Geschichtsforschung (1893).
- Die berichtigte Lutherbibel (1894).
- Das Verhältnis des Menschenopfers zur israelitischen Religion (1898).
- "The Book of Daniel, a critical edition of the Hebrew and Aramaic text", (English translation of Kamphausen's text by B.W. Bacon and D.B. Macdonald. Leipzig : J.C. Hinrichs; Baltimore : Johns Hopkins Press; 1896).
- Encyclopaedia Biblica (contributor).
