= Georgian Poetry =

Series of poetry anthologies, 1912–1922

Georgian Poetry is a series of anthologies showcasing the work of a school of English poetry that established itself during the early years of the reign of King George V of the United Kingdom.

The Georgian poets were, by the strictest definition, those whose works appeared in a series of five anthologies named Georgian Poetry, published by Harold Monro's Poetry Bookshop in London and edited by Edward Marsh, the first volume of which contained poems written in 1911 and 1912. The group included Edmund Blunden, Rupert Brooke, Robert Graves, D. H. Lawrence, Walter de la Mare, Siegfried Sassoon, Ralph Hodgson, and John Drinkwater. Until the final two volumes, the decision had not been taken to include female poets.

== History ==
The period of publication was sandwiched between the Victorian era, with its strict classicism, and Modernism, with its strident rejection of pure aestheticism. The common features of the poems in these publications were romanticism, sentimentality, and hedonism. Later critics have attempted to revise the definition of the term as a description of poetic style, thereby including some new names or excluding some old ones. W. H. Davies, a contemporary, is sometimes included within the grouping, although his "innocent style" differs markedly from that of the others.

In the 1930s, Henry Newbolt "estimated there were still at least 1000 active poets" in England, and that "the vast majority would be recognisably 'Georgian'".

Edward Marsh was the general editor of the series and the centre of the circle of Georgian poets, which included Rupert Brooke. It has been suggested that Brooke himself took a hand in some of the editorial choices.

The idea for an anthology began as a joke, when Marsh, Duncan Grant, and George Mallory decided, one evening in 1912, to publish a parody of the many small poetry books that were appearing at the time. After some discussion, they decided to pursue the idea in all seriousness. Marsh and Brooke approached poet and bookseller Harold Monro, who had recently opened The Poetry Bookshop at 35 Devonshire Street, in Bloomsbury, London. He agreed to publish the book in return for a half share of the profits.

After the third volume, Marsh decided that it was time to include a female poet. His choice was Fredegond Shove, although other associates suggested Edith Sitwell, Charlotte Mew, and Rose Macaulay. He included four poems from Shove's recent first collection, Dreams and Journeys (1918), including among them "The New Soul", a quasi-mystical approach to a religious subject that went on to attract the notice of critics. The final volume contained seven poems from the fifth collection of Vita Sackville-West, Orchard and Vineyard (1921).

Subsequent to the final anthology of five, further collections appeared, edited by J. C. Squire, which were probably intended to take on the mantle. The subsequent fate of the Georgian poets (inevitably known as the Squirearchy) then became an aspect of the critical debate surrounding modernist poetry, as marked by the publication of T. S. Eliot's The Waste Land at just that time. The Georgian poets became something of a by-word for conservatism, but at the time of the early anthologies they saw themselves as modern (if not modernist) and progressive. The most important figures, in literary terms, would now be considered D. H. Lawrence and Robert Graves, neither of them 'typical'.

== Georgian Poetry 1911–12 (1912) ==
Lascelles Abercrombie - Gordon Bottomley - Rupert Brooke - G. K. Chesterton - W. H. Davies - Walter de la Mare - John Drinkwater - James Elroy Flecker - W. W. Gibson - D. H. Lawrence - John Masefield - Harold Monro - T. Sturge Moore - Ronald Ross - Edmund Beale Sargant - James Stephens - R. C. Trevelyan

== Georgian Poetry 1913–15 (1915) ==
Lascelles Abercrombie - Gordon Bottomley - Rupert Brooke - W. H. Davies - Walter de la Mare - John Drinkwater - J. E. Flecker - W. W. Gibson - Ralph Hodgson - D. H. Lawrence - F. Ledwidge - John Masefield - Harold Monro - James Stephens

== Georgian Poetry 1916–17 (1917) ==
Herbert Asquith - Maurice Baring - Gordon Bottomley - W. H. Davies - Walter de la Mare - John Drinkwater - John Freeman - W. W. Gibson - Robert Graves - Ralph Hodgson - John Masefield - Harold Monro - Robert Nichols - Isaac Rosenberg - Siegfried Sassoon - J. C. Squire - James Stephens - W. J. Turner

== Georgian Poetry 1918–19 (1919) ==
Lascelles Abercrombie - Gordon Bottomley - Francis Brett Young - W. H. Davies - Walter de la Mare - John Drinkwater - John Freeman - W. W. Gibson - Robert Graves - D. H. Lawrence- Harold Monro - Thomas Moult - Robert Nichols - J. D. C. Pellow - Siegfried Sassoon - Edward Shanks - Fredegond Shove - J. C. Squire - W. J. Turner

== Georgian Poetry 1920–22 (1922) ==
Lascelles Abercrombie - Martin Armstrong - Edmund Blunden - Francis Brett Young - W. H. Davies - Walter de la Mare - John Drinkwater - John Freeman - W. W. Gibson - Robert Graves - Richard Hughes - William Kerr - D. H. Lawrence - Harold Monro - Robert Nichols - J. D. C. Pellow - Frank Prewett - Peter Quennell - Vita Sackville-West - Edward Shanks - J. C. Squire

== See also ==
- 1912 in poetry
- 1915 in poetry
- 1917 in poetry
- 1919 in poetry
- 1922 in poetry
- English poetry
- List of poetry anthologies
