= Encyclopaedia Biblica =

1899 encyclopedia of the Bible

Encyclopaedia Biblica: A Critical Dictionary of the Literary, Political and Religion History, the Archeology, Geography and Natural History of the Bible (1899), edited by Thomas Kelly Cheyne and J. Sutherland Black, is a critical encyclopedia of the Bible. In theology and biblical studies, it is often referenced as Enc. Bib., or as Cheyne and Black.

== Description ==
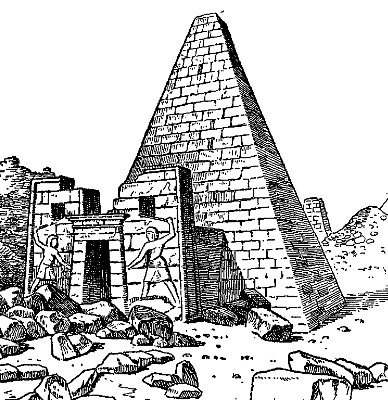
An image illustrating the article 'Ethiopia' – one of the Nubian pyramids at Meroe

It has an article for every single name and place both in the Bible and in its traditional Apocrypha, as well as for each of the books of these, together with many improper nouns appearing in these (such as nebi'im, 'mole', 'owl') and other more general subjects (such as 'music', 'tents', etc.). Many of these articles are given in great detail, and usually include mention of the various spellings for each word as used by the Masoretic Text, Septuagint (differentiating between each of the most important ancient manuscripts), and by other ancient versions; the largest article is that on the Gospels, which is over 5 MB in size, despite being almost completely plain text (and therefore over half a million words long). It is thus an extremely large work – in PDF form it constitutes a total of about 190 MB of mostly plain text (this would equate to nearly 20 million words, even at 10 characters per word).

It is frequently referenced by other respected Bible-related encyclopedias of the period, such as the Catholic Encyclopedia, and 11th Edition of the Encyclopædia Britannica for example. The Jewish Encyclopedia has some articles ('marriage' for example) which quote large sections from it nearly verbatim. It is also referenced by works such as the International Standard Bible Encyclopedia. It is hence, indirectly, also a source for some articles of the English Wikipedia, mainly related to the Judaeo-Christian religion.

A measure of its importance of some of the contributors is gained from the fact that the Jewish Encyclopedia dedicates the majority of the article 'Jerahmeel' to discussing Cheyne's theory of the Jerahmeelites, despite regarding it as arbitrary.

The articles are still of value and interest to modern scholars and Islamic writers, however, modern archaeological research and discoveries have made portions of it obsolete, and modern interpretations are of even older material is likely to be very different. For example, the Jerahmeelite/Arabian theory (see below) has long been ignored. It is no longer restricted by copyright and has become available online.

== Authors and contributors ==
The authors of the articles include many of the most respected biblical scholars at the time it was written. Several held senior professorships at important universities and many held the highest academic qualification – the Doctor of Divinity. The contributors were:

- Anthony Ashley Bevan, Lord Almoner's Professor of Arabic, Cambridge.
- A. E. Shipley, MA, FZS, Fellow, Tutor, and Lecturer at Christ's College, Cambridge.
- Adolf Jülicher, Professor of Church History and New Testament Exegesis, University of Marburg.
- Adolf Kamphausen, Professor of Old Testament Exegesis, University of Bonn.
- Archibald Kennedy, R. S., MA, DD, Professor of Hebrew and Semitic Languages, the University of Edinburgh.
- C. Creighton, MD, Great Ormond Street Hospital
- Charles Fox Burney, Lecturer in Hebrew, and Fellow of St John's College, Oxford.
- C. H. W. Johns, MA, Queens' College, Cambridge.
- C. J. Ball, MA, Chaplain to the Honourable Society of Lincoln's Inn, London.
- Cornelis Petrus Tiele, Professor of Comparative History and Philosophy of Religion (which was specially created for him), Leiden University.
- Eduard Meyer, Professor of Ancient History, University of Halle.
- Francis Brown, DD, Davenport Professor of Hebrew and the cognate Languages in the Union Theological Seminary, New York.
- George Adam Smith, DD LLD, Professor of Hebrew and Old Testament Exegesis, Free Church College, Glasgow (later made principal of the University of Aberdeen).
- George Augustus Simcox, MA, Queen's College, Oxford.
- Buchanan Gray, MA, Lecturer in Hebrew and Old Testament Theology, Mansfield College, Oxford.
- George Foot Moore, DD, Professor of Hebrew in Andover Theological Seminary, Andover, Mass.
- Hermann Guthe, a.o. Professor of Old Testament Exegesis, Leipzig University.
- Baron Hermann von Soden, Professor of New Testament Exegesis, University of Berlin.
- Hope W. Hogg, MA
- Heinrich Zimmern, a.o. Professor of Assyriology, Leipzig.
- Israel Abrahams, London, Editor of the Jewish Quarterly Review (and highly respected scholar of Judaism).
- Immanuel Benzinger, University of Berlin.
- J. Armitage Robinson, DD, Canon of Westminster Cathedral.
- John Massie, Yates Professor of New Testament Exegesis in Mansfield College, Oxford; formerly scholar of St John's College, Cambridge.
- Karl Budde, Professor of Old Testament Exegesis, University of Strasbourg.
- Karl Marti, Professor of Old Testament Exegesis and the Hebrew Language, University of Berne.
- Lucien Gautier, Professor of Old Testament Exegesis and History, University of Lausanne.
- Leonard William King, MA, FSA, Assistant to the Keeper of Egyptian and Assyrian Antiquities, British Museum (and former lecturer in Babylo-Assyriological Archaeology at King's College, Cambridge)
- Maurice A. Canney, MA (Oxon.)
- Morris Jastrow Jr., PhD, Professor of Semitic Languages in the University of Pennsylvania.
- M. R. James, LittD, Fellow and Dean of King's College, Cambridge.
- Norman McLean, MA, Lecturer in Hebrew, and Fellow of Christ's College, Lecturer in Semitic Languages at Gonville and Caius College, Cambridge.
- Nathaniel Schmidt, Professor of Semitic Languages and Literature, Cornell University, Ithaca, New York.
- Owen C. Whitehouse MA, Principal and Professor of Biblical Exegesis and Theology in the Countess of Huntingdon's College, Cheshunt, Herts.
- Paul Wilhelm Schmiedel, Professor of New Testament Exegesis, University of Zurich.
- Robert Henry Charles, MA, DD, Professor of Biblical Greek in Trinity College, Dublin.
- Robert W. Rogers, PhD, DD, Professor of Hebrew, Drew Theological Seminary, Madison, New Jersey.
- Stanley A. Cook, MA (Cantab.)
- Samuel Rolles Driver, DD, Regius Professor of Hebrew, Canon of Christ Church, Oxford.
- Theophilus G. Pinches, MRAS, Egyptian and Assyrian Department, British Museum.
- T. K. Cheyne, MA, DD, Oriel Professor of the Interpretation of Holy Scripture at Oxford, Canon of Rochester Cathedral.
- Theodor Nöldeke, Professor of Semitic Languages, University of Strasbourg.
- T. W. Davies, PhD, Professor of Old Testament Literature, North Wales Baptist College, Bangor; Lecturer in Semitic Languages, University College, Bangor.
- Wilhelm Bousset, a.o., Professor of New Testament Exegesis, University of Göttingen.
- W. E. Addis, MA, Lecturer in Old Testament Criticism, Manchester College, Oxford.
- W. H. Bennett, Professor of Biblical Languages and Literature, Hackney Theological Seminary, and Professor of Old Testament Exegesis, New College, London.
- W. H. Kosters, Professor of Old Testament Exegesis, Leiden University.
- William John Woodhouse, MA, Lecturer in Classical Philology, University College of North Wales, Bangor, and later in Ancient History at St Andrews University.
- W. Max Müller, Professor of Old Testament Literature, Reformed Episcopal Seminary, West Philadelphia.
- William Ridgeway, Disney Professor of Archaeology, Cambridge.
- William Robertson Smith, Professor of Arabic, Cambridge.
- William Sanday, DD, LLD, Lady Margaret Professor of Divinity, Canon of Christ Church, Oxford.
- William Turner Thiselton-Dyer, CMG, LLD, FRS., Director of the Royal Botanic Gardens, Kew.
- Willem Christiaan van Manen, Professor of Old Christian Literature and New Testament exegesis, University of Leiden.

== Cheyne's 'surprising' theory about the Jerahmeelites ==
Emil G. Hirsch and George A. Barton wrote in the Jewish Encyclopedia:

From the foregoing references the natural inference is that the Jerahmeelites were a Judean clan, to the south of whose habitat a part of the Negeb extended. But professor Cheyne put forth a surprising theory concerning the Jerahmeelites. In his view they were a powerful north-Arabian tribe, with which the Hebrews came into conflict on their first approach to the land. A part of the Jerahmeelites was absorbed by the Hebrews, but there were many contests between the Israelites and the main body of the Jerahmeelites all through the period of the Kings. Even among the post-exilic opponents of Nehemiah, the Jerahmeelites appear again. Cheyne believes that echoes of these conflicts once reverberated throughout the Old Testament, but that, owing to the corruption of the Masoretic Text, they must now be reawakened by conjectural emendation of the text.
Carrying out this idea, Cheyne finds the chief elements of Israel's origin, religion, and history in Jerahmeel. Babylonia and Assyria sink into insignificance beside Jerahmeel in so far as influence on the Old Testament is concerned. "Amalekites" is a corruption of "Jerahmeelites"; "Beer-lahai-roi" (Gen. xvi. 14) is a corruption of "Well of Jerahmeel"; "Ephraim" is often a corruption of "Jerahmeel." The epithet of Jericho, "city of palm-trees," is a corruption of "city of Jerahmeel"; the names of Saul, of Kish, his father, and of most of the sons of Saul are held to be corruptions of "Jerahmeel"; and Isaiah's "Maher-shalal-hash-baz" is held to be a corruption of "Jerahmeel will be deserted." "Jerahmeel" has been displaced by "Babylon" in Isa. xiii. and xiv.; and Ezekiel's three wise men were "Enoch, Jerahmeel, and Arab." This list might be continued indefinitely.
The ingenuity of Cheyne's method may be admitted; but the thesis must be rejected as altogether arbitrary. That it has received serious attention is owing solely to the great service rendered by its sponsor in other departments of Old Testament research.

By the same principle, he derives other names from "Rehoboth", "Zarephath", "Mizraim", and "Arab"; he does not equate "Mizraim" with Egypt (the usual interpretation). The vast majority of names of places and people in the bible are connected by Cheyne to Jerahmeel, or one of these.

Cheyne frequently mentions this theory in his Encyclopaedia articles, often appending his view to articles written by people with more mainstream interpretations. He does, however, detail the alternative (and therefore mainstream) views, while doing so. Hence the articles are respected, as long as Cheyne's theory about these names is ignored.

== See also ==
- List of online encyclopedias
