= S. S. Koteliansky =

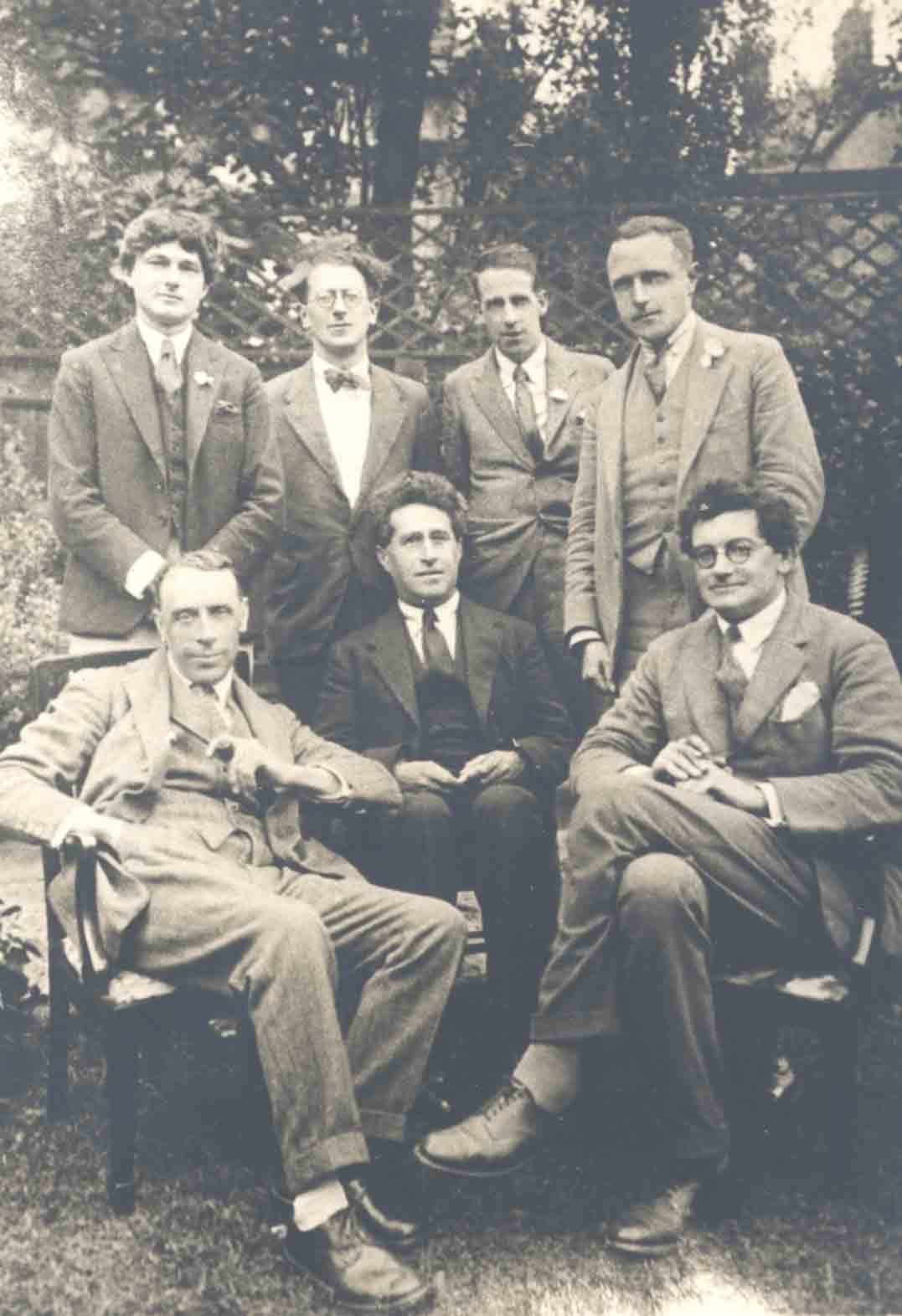
Standing, left to right: Mark Gertler, Hewy Levy, Walter J. Turner, Alan Milne. Seated, left to right: Ralph Hodgson, S. S. Koteliansky and J.W.N. Sullivan (1928)

Samuel Solomonovich Koteliansky (Самуил Соломонович Котелянский) (February 28, 1880 – January 21, 1955) was a Russian-born British translator. He made the transition from his origins in a small Jewish shtetl to distinction in the rarefied world of English letters. Although he was not a creative writer himself, he befriended, corresponded with, helped publish, and otherwise served as intermediary between some of the most prominent people in English literary life in the early twentieth century.

== Biography ==
Koteliansky was born in the small Jewish shtetl (town) of Ostropol in the Volhynian Governorate of the Russian Empire (today in Khmelnytskyi Oblast, western Ukraine), where his first language almost certainly was Yiddish. The name Koteliansky, according to his biographer Galya Diment, most likely comes from a small town near Ostropol called Kotelianka. He was educated and attended university in Russia.

By 1911, financed by his mother, Beila, he had moved to London, where he became a great friend of D.H. Lawrence, and Leonard and Virginia Woolf. He also adored the short-story writer Katherine Mansfield. Although his romantic affection for her was not reciprocated, the two maintained a close relationship in person and in letters until her early death in 1923. His friendship with her was also documented in a painting by Beatrice Elvery, Lady Glenavy.

He was business manager of The Adelphi, a prominent literary journal that published works of Lawrence, Mansfield, the young Dylan Thomas, and many other leading lights of early- and mid-twentieth-century English letters after its founding in 1923. But Koteliansky eventually broke with the journal's founder (and Katherine Mansfield's husband) John Middleton Murry. He was an early translator into English (often with the collaboration of Leonard or Virginia Woolf) of works of Russian authors, such as Dostoevsky, Chekhov, and Rozanov, and he helped those authors achieve prominence in the English-speaking world.

Koteliansky ('Kot') was a close friend of the artist Mark Gertler, and they corresponded extensively from 1914 until Gertler's death in 1939.
