= Elizabeth Gibson Cheyne =

British poet and writer

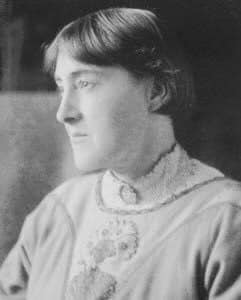
- Cheyne, c. 1910
- Born: 2 January 1869; Hexham, Northumberland, United Kingdom
- Died: 24 April 1931 (aged 62); London, United Kingdom

Elizabeth Gibson Cheyne (2 January 1869 – 24 April 1931) was a British poet and writer. She wrote over twenty books. She died in a psychiatric hospital.

== Life ==
Elizabeth Gibson was born in Hexham in 1869. Her parents were Elizabeth Judith Frances (born Walton) and John Pattison Gibson. Her father was a chemist who was interested in photography and antiquarianism and her brother was the war poet Wilfrid Wilson Gibson. She supplemented his private school education by teaching him about poetry.

She published her work in magazines and in 1899 her book of aphorisms, The Evangel of Joy, was published. The work was dedicated to her close friend (Sophia) May Bowley (1864–1960) who was an illustrator. Elizabeth appears to have been bisexual and later that year she became engaged to marry William Henry Phelps who was also a poet. In time, Phelps ended the engagement.

Thomas Kelly Cheyne wrote a glowing a review of her work in 1911. The review was in the progressive Christian Commonwealth. He was a widower after his first wife Frances Godfrey died in 1907.

Elizabeth Gibson had published about twenty books of poetry or prose and she was an established writer. Their common interest fueled a whirlwind romance that resulted in their marriage in the Cornish village of Mawnan in Cornwall on 28 August 1911. Afterwards, she joined Cheyne at his home in Oxford where they worked together actively supporting the suffrage hunger strikers and calls for peace with Germany. Her 1912 book The Voice of One Crying was "arranged in cycles by T. K. C. i.e. Thomas Kelly Cheyne".

Her husband died in 1915, and she was left with a small civil list pension. She took to spiritualism and Christianity. In 1919, King's College London ran a theology course, but her study was interrupted by delusions. She volunteered to be a patient at the psychiatric Bethlem Royal Hospital. Cheyne died in Camberwell House Asylum London in 1931.
