= Lucien Gautier =

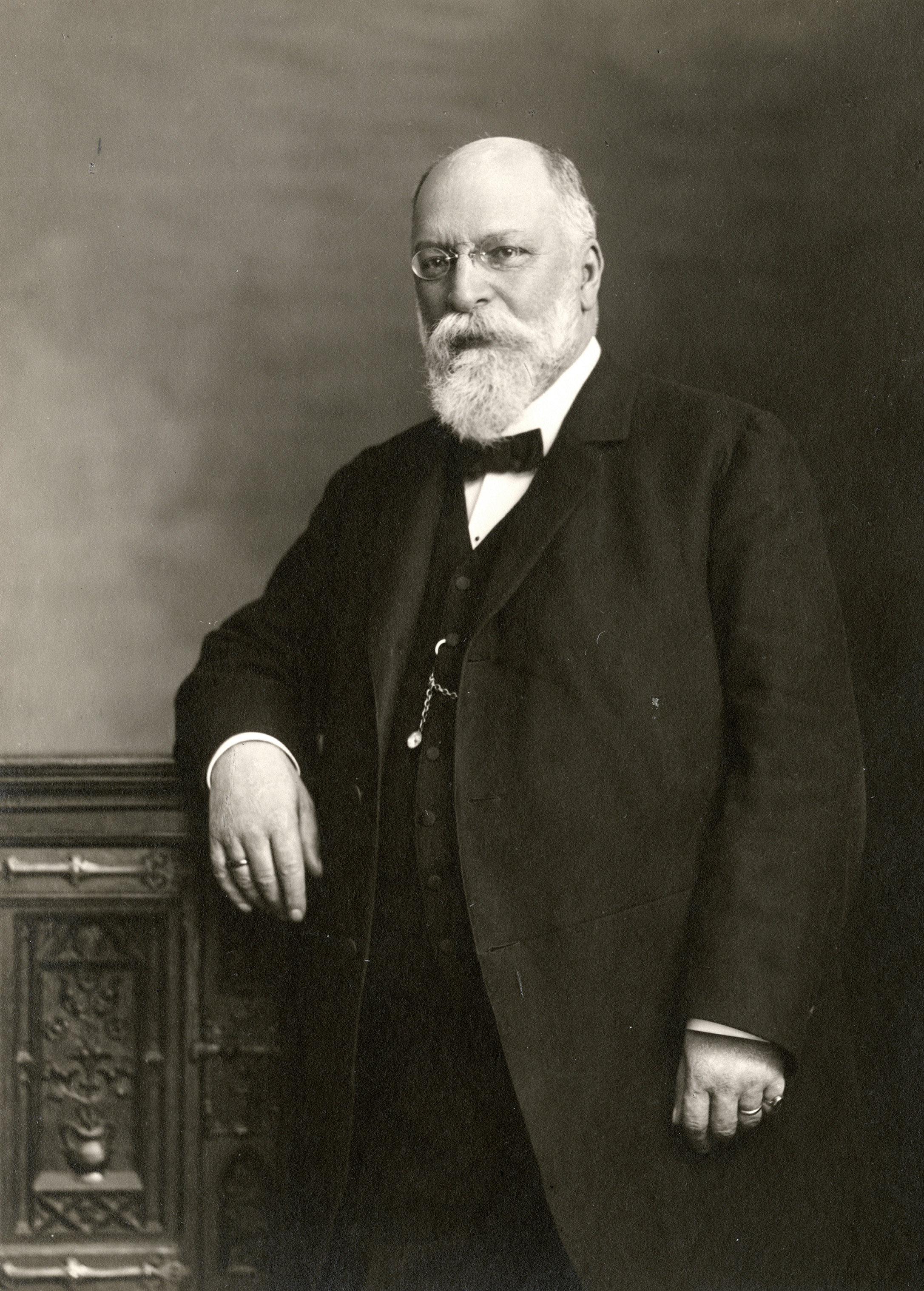

Charles Lucien Gautier (1850-1924) was a Swiss theologian, born at Cologny, near Geneva, and educated at Geneva, Leipzig, and Tübingen. In 1877-98 he was professor of Hebrew and Old Testament exegesis at Lausanne, and thereafter honorary professor. He was the president of the synod of the Vaudois église libre in 1885, 1886, 1891, and 1892. He traveled in Palestine in 1893-94 and 1899, and wrote:

- Au dela du Jourdain (1895; second edition, 1896)
- Souvenirs de Terre-Sainte (1898)
- Autour de la Mer Morte (1901)

In addition he translated Ghazali's Ad-Dourra el Fâkhira (1878) and wrote:

- Le sacerdoce dans l'Ancien Testament (1874)
- La mission du prophète Ezéchiel (1891)
- Vocations de prophètes (1901; in German, 1903)
- Introduction a l'Ancien Testament (1906)
- La loi dans l'ancienne Alliance (1908)
- L'Evangeliste de l'exil (1911)

He also contributed to the Encyclopaedia Biblica (1903)
