= George Augustus Simcox =

George Augustus Simcox (18 July 1841 – 1905) was a British classical scholar and poet. He was a Fellow of Queen's College, Oxford.

He was educated at the University of Oxford. He was also a critic and busy literary reviewer, in magazines such as the Argosy, the Fortnightly Review and the Academy; and essayist for The Nation. He published some substantial poems, on Arthurian themes in particular.

The theological writer and biographer William Henry Simcox was his brother, and the activist Edith Jemima Simcox his sister. The Simcoxes were well known and well connected in English intellectual circles; Edith was a friend of George Eliot's, and William wrote the first major biography of Barnabe Barnes, the famous 16th-century poet and patron of William Shakespeare.

George died in unexplained circumstances on the Irish coast near the Giant's Causeway.

== Works ==
- Prometheus Unbound. A Tragedy (1867)
- Thirteen Satires of Juvenal (1867)
- Poems and Romances (1869)
- The Orations of Demosthenes and Aeschines on the Crown (1872) with W. H. Simcox
- Recollections of a Rambler (1874)
- Thucydides (1875) editor
- A History of Latin Literature: from Ennius to Boethius (1883) two volumes
- Encyclopaedia Biblica (contributor) (1903)
