= An Outline of Modern Knowledge =

1931 British encyclopedia

An Outline of Modern Knowledge, published by Victor Gollancz in 1931, was an “omnibus” volume intended to survey the full range of human knowledge.

It was the first such volume to include entirely new material. Editor William Rose solicited leading authorities of the time, including Roger Fry, C. G. Seligman, Maurice Dobb, F. J. C. Hearnshaw, G. D. H. Cole, J. C. Flügel, R. R. Marett, and J. W. N. Sullivan among others, to contribute informative essays written for the common reader.

The publishers explained their reasons for creating such a volume in the introduction to the book:

“The planning of the present book was therefore based on the assumption that the only way to provide a conspectus of the actual achievements of scholarship and thought would be in a sufficient number of presentations by leading authorities who are themselves original investigators in the essential fields of study. Each contributor outlines the past history of his subject before leading up to an exposition of the present state of knowledge and the relation of his field of work to the life and thought of to-day. Each Article has been specially written for this book, and there has been sufficient discussion between the editor and the contributors, and between the contributors themselves, to ensure that it shall fit into its place in the general plan. An essential condition of the success of the book*s intention was that simplification should not be carried to the stage which must inevitably result in distortion, yet that the thought in each contribution should be developed with a gradualness and lucidity which would make every successive point crystal clear to the reader who comes afresh to the subject. Each reader will be able to make his own synthesis, in so far as any kind of synthesis is possible, and will be helped towards an understanding of the fundamental problem which mankind has still to solve — the problem of life itself, with the questions it entails of free- will and survival. ”

The twenty-four articles carried the reader through the subjects of science, philosophy, religion, sex, mathematics, astronomy, biology, anthropology, cosmogony, psychology, psycho-analysis, archaeology, economics, politics, finance, industry, internationalism, history, ethnology, geography, literary criticism, music, architecture, painting and sculpture.

== Updated Edition ==
The book was a best-seller, selling almost 100,000 copies by 1937 when it went out of print. The publisher postponed a further reprint as there were plans to update the articles based on changing current events. These plans were derailed by the Second World War. In 1956, a completely new edition, 'The New Outline of Modern Knowledge' with different authors was published. It was edited by Alan Pryce-Jones, the editor of The Times Literary Supplement. The book contained 26 outlines, comprising 280,000 words in total on 621 pages and was sold for 18/- (90p).
