= Soltan Abbas =

Azerbaijani poet (1933–2025)

Soltan Abbas

Soltan (or Sultan) Abbas (7 January 1933 – 19 July 2025) was an Azerbaijani poet.

== Life and career ==
Abbas was born 7 January 1933 in Ballicali, Neftchala District, Azerbaijan SSR, Transcaucasian SFSR, USSR. Throughout his career, he published a number of poems, including "Damascus (1979), "Roads —My Life" (1989) and "Owner of the land" (2008).

He was awarded the Honorary Orders of the Soviet Union.

Abbas died on 19 July 2025, at the age of 92.
