= Wilfrid Wilson Gibson =

British poet (1878–1962)

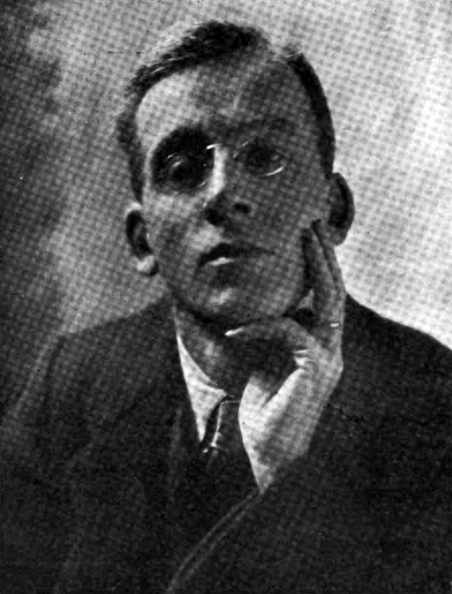
Wilfrid Wilson Gibson in The Bookman Vol 57, December 1919.

Wilfrid Wilson Gibson (2 October 1878 – 26 May 1962) was a British Georgian poet, who was associated with World War I but continued publishing poetry into the 1940s and 1950s.

== Early work ==
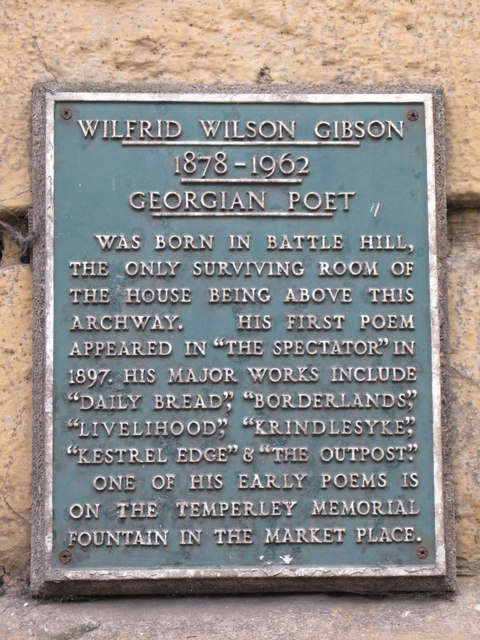
Memorial plaque in Hexham.

Gibson was born in Hexham, Northumberland. His parents were Elizabeth Judith Frances (born Walton) and John Pattison Gibson. Her father was a chemist who was interested in photography and antiquarianism. His elder sister Elizabeth, who became his teacher and mentor, also became a published poet. He left the north for London in 1914 after his mother died. He had been publishing poems in magazines since 1895, and his first collections in book form were published by Elkin Mathews in 1902. His collections of verse plays and dramatic poems The Stonefolds and On The Threshold were published by the Samurai Press (of Cranleigh) in 1907, followed next year by the book of poems, The Web of Life.

Despite his residence in London, and later in Gloucestershire, many of Gibson's poems both then and later, have Northumberland settings: Hexham's Market Cross; Hareshaw; and The Kielder Stone. Others deal with poverty and passion amid wild Northumbrian landscapes. Still others are devoted to fishermen, industrial workers and miners, often alluding to local ballads and the rich folk-song heritage of the North East.

In London, he met both Edward Marsh and Rupert Brooke, becoming a close friend and later Brooke's literary executor (with Lascelles Abercrombie and Walter de la Mare). This was at the period when the first Georgian Poetry anthology was being hatched. Gibson was one of the insiders.

During the early part of his writing life, Wilfrid Wilson Gibson wrote poems that featured the "macabre". One such poem is "Flannan Isle", based on a real-life mystery.

Gibson was one of the founders of the Dymock poets, a group of writers who lived in and around the village of Dymock, on the Gloucestershire/Herefordshire border, in the years immediately before the outbreak of the First World War.

Gibson also published plays, as well as several prose works. For instance, he wrote and argued beautifully about the merit of verse at the time of World War II. He wrote a piece of criticism on Italian Nationalism and English Letters by Harry W. Rudman regarding the contributions made by Italian exiles in England to English literature, which were in the form of poetry by and large. He also wrote criticism on The Burning Oracle: Studies in the Poetry of Action by G. Wilson Knight, wherein he commends the fact that Knight sees the creative energy of living writers not only in the creation of artworks, but also in the creation of life itself.

== Death and reputation ==
Gibson died on 26 May 1962, in Virginia Water, Surrey.

His reputation was eclipsed somewhat by the Ezra Pound-T. S. Eliot school of Modernist poetry, though his work remained popular.
