= John Sutherland Black =

Scottish editor and scholar (1846–1923)

Rev John Sutherland Black FRSE LLD (1846–1923) was a Scottish biblical scholar and contributor to the Encyclopædia Britannica and Dictionary of National Biography. He was a noted literary editor and amateur astronomer. In encyclopedic references, Black is usually just shown as J.S.B.

== Life ==
Black was born in Dunnikier, near Kirkcaldy, in Fife, on 4 July 1846. He was the son of Rev James Black, the local minister of the Secession Church. Black attended the Burgh School in Kirkcaldy. He then attended the University of Edinburgh, graduating with an MA and then an LLD.

From 1878 to 1889 Black was Assistant Editor for Encyclopædia Britannica (9th Edition). From 1894 to 1903 he was joint editor of the Encyclopedia Biblica. In the same period he was a major contributor to the Dictionary of National Biography.

From 1906 until 1916 Black was Curator of records at the Royal Society of Edinburgh.

Black died in London on 22 February 1923.

== Works ==
- Sketches from Eastern History, by Theodor Nöldeke (1892) [translated by Sutherland]
- Dante illustrations and notes (1890) illustrated by Phoebe Anna Traquair
- The Life of William Robertson Smith (1906), with George William Chrystal

== Memberships ==
- Fellow of the Royal Society of Edinburgh
- Member of the Edinburgh Astronomical Institution.
