= Puttaparthi Narayanacharyulu =

- Born: 28 March 1914; Chiyyedu, Anantapur Taluq, Anantapur district, Andhra Pradesh
- Died: September 1, 1990 (aged 76); Cuddapah, Andhra Pradesh
- Education: Siromani, Vidwan
- Alma mater: Tirupati Sanskrit College
- Occupation: Teacher
- Spouse: Puttaparthi Kanakamma
- Children: 5 daughters and 1 son
- Writing career
- Period: 1914-1990
- Genres: Poet, composer, critic, orator, commentator, translator
- Subject: Telugu Guddu Kavi
- Notable works: Shivathandavam, Pandari Bhagavatham, Janapriya Ramayanam, Meghadutam
- Notable awards: Padma Shri, Honorary Doctorates from Sri Venkateswara University and SKD University
- Website: saraswatiputraputtaparthi.com

Puttaparthi Narayanacharyulu (28 March 1914 – 1 September 1990) was a classical poet, literary critic, composer, musicologist, translator and polyglot.

== Life sketch ==
Narayanacharyulu was born in a Sri Vaishnava Brahmin family in Chiyyedu Village in Penukonda taluq of Anantapur district. His father Sriman Puttaparthi Thirumala Sreenivasacharya was a Pandit and commentator of his times and the child Puttaparthi used to accompany him during his Purana Pravachanams. Puttaparthi's mother Kondamma (Mendamma) also was a poet and scholar in music and both the parents influenced Puttaparthi in his childhood.

He studied Sanskrit literature up to Siromani at Tirupati Sanskrit College. He learned grammar, meter, figures of speech from the likes of Kapilasthalam Krishnamacharyulu and D.T. Tatacharyulu. He learned Bharatanatyam under the guidance of dancer Ranjakam Mahalakshmamma. He learned classical Carnatic music from Pakka Hanumanthacharyulu. He learned English literature from Mrs. Pitt, wife of a deceased Sub collector of Penugonda (Ananthapur-A.P) at the age of 14. He practiced Pakrit languages from his paternal uncle Sriman Rallapalli Anantha Krishna Sarma. After that Puttaparthi studied many more languages, including Kannada, Tamil, French, Latin, Persian and numerous Prakrit variations. His wife Smt Puttaparthi Kanakamma (DB 22 July 1922) was also a poet of her own calibre who penned "Gandhiji Mahaprasthanam', 'Agniveena' and many more devotional lyrics. She was honoured as a 'Best woman writer' in 1975 by A.P. Sahitya Academy.

Puttaparthi has about 50 works of poetry, 10 works of translations, hundreds of articles (on Telugu, Tamil, Kannada, Malayalam, Prakrit, Hindi and Sanskrit literatures) and about 7,000 musical compositions to his credit. His Janapriya Ramayanam won Central Sahitya Akademi literary award in the year 1979. He got the award of Bharateeya Bhasha Parshath, Kolkatta for his epic 'Sreenivasa Prabandham' in 1988. His English work "Leaves in the Wind" written at the age of 20 was appreciated by well-known Indo-Anglican poet Sri Harindranath Chattopadyaya. Further, he wrote a playlet named 'The Hero' (under the influence of Milton), which was also critically acclaimed.

He was a polyglot and pundit in many languages, as he was fluent in 14 languages. His life size bronze statue was installed in Proddatur town by Puttaparthi Narayanacharyulu Sahithi Peetham in 2007.

== Literary works ==
- Bhagavatha Sudha lahari (a 13 volume work; vyakhya on Srimadbhagavatham)
- Suvarna Patramulu (a translation from Marathi)
- Saraswathi samharam (a novel of Beechi, translated from Kannada)
- Astakshari kruthulu (7,000 devotional lyrics out of which 250 and 1001 (during his centenary year) with same name are published)
- Bhagawan Buddha (translation from Marathi)
- Chennakesava suprabhatam (Sanskrit)
- Ekavira (translation to Malayalam)
- Leaves in the Wind (English)
- The Hero (English)
- Pandari Bhagavatam (Dwipada kavyam)
- Penugonda Lakshmi(A poetry in his 12th year and his text book at his 31st year in Vidwan exam)
- Prabandha Nayikalu
- Saakshaatkaaram
- Smasanadeepam (translation from Malayalam)
- Teerani baaki (translated Malayalam playlets)
- Shivakarnamritam (Sanskrit)
- Shivathandavam
- Padyamu
- Sipayi pituri
- Agastheeswara Suprabhatham (Sanskrit)
- Tyagarajaswami suprabhatam (Sanskrit)
- Vijayanagara samajika charitra (Telugu)
- Meghadootham
- Shaji
- Srinivasa Prabandham (Maha kavyam) 'Kavyadwayi'(A compilation of 'Gandhiji Maha prasthanam' and 'Agniveena', both by Smt. and Dr. Puttaparthi)
- Vasucharitra sahiteesourabham (criticism)
- Prabandha nayikalu (criticism)

Posthumous publications

- Prakrutha vyasa manjari (Pakrit Sahitya Vyasalu published after his demise by Dr. Puttaparthi Nagapadmini - poet's 4th daughter))
- Vyasa valmikam (compilation of Puttaparthi's articles on South Indian literature published after his demise by Dr. Puttaparthi Nagapadmini))
- Triputi (compilation of Dr. Puttaparthi's forewords, vyakhyas and editorials published after his demise by Dr. Puttaparthi Nagapadmini))
- Saraswathi putrunitho sambhashanalu (compilation of Dr. Puttaparthi's several interviews published after his demise by Dr. Puttaparthi Nagapadmini))
- Marapurani madhura gadha (compilation of Dr. Puttaparthi's articles on the Vijayanagara Empire, published after his demise by Dr. Puttaparthi Nagapadmini)

== Awards ==
- He was honoured with title Saraswatiputra (son of Goddess of Learning) by Sivananda Saraswati in Hrishikesh.
- Padma Shri Award by Government of India in 1972.
- Honorary Doctorates by Sri Venkateswara University and Sri Krishnadevaraya University.
