= Konstantin Pavlov =

Bulgarian screenwriter, author and poet

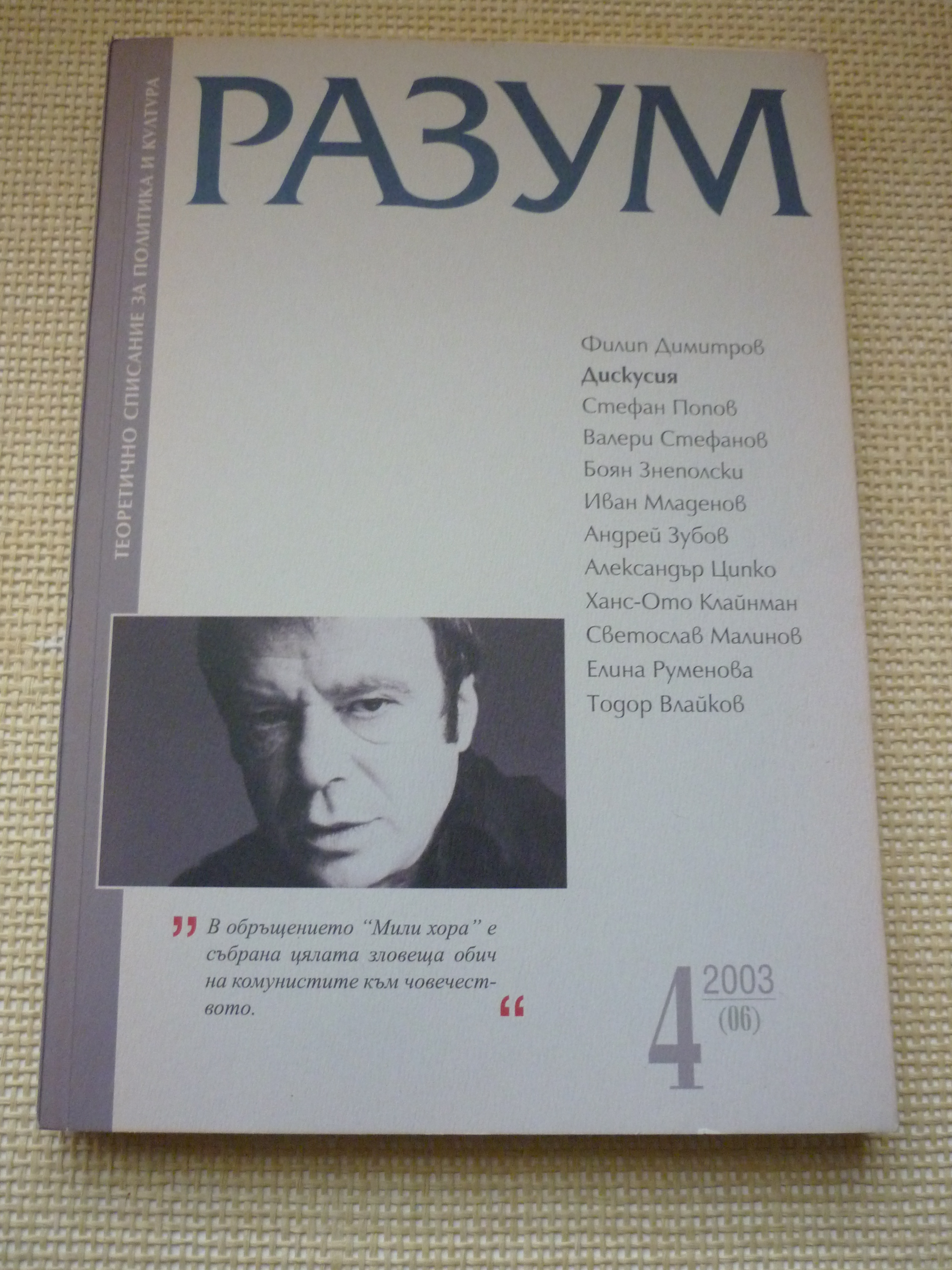
Cover of the fourth issue of Bulgarian conservative magazine „Reason“ in 2003. The number is dedicated to Konstantin Pavlov.

Konstantin Pavlov (Bulgarian: Константин Павлов) (April 2, 1933 – September 28, 2008) was a Bulgarian screenwriter, author and poet. Pavlov became a prominent intellectual during Bulgaria's Communist era, even though he faced censorship and a ten-year-long publishing ban by the government.

Pavlov was born on April 2, 1933, in the former village of Vitoshko, near the capital Sofia. He was among the few Bulgarian authors and intellectuals who dared to act autonomously and defy the Bulgarian Communist government, which ruled the country from 1945 until 1989. Government censors began a ten-year-long publishing ban against his work beginning in 1966. Bulgarians began illegally publishing and reading Pavlov's poems during the censorship against his work.

Pavlov received numerous awards in literature and poetry. He was "granted" the Grand Prix at the Karlovy Vary International Film Festival in 1980 for his screenplay of the film, Illusion. His works were translated in numerous European languages.

Some of Pavlov's most popular works of poetry included Sweet Agony, published in 1991; The Murder of the Sleeping Man in 1992; and the A Long Time Ago ... in 1998. He had a wife, Maria, and the couple had a daughter.

Pavlov died in Sofia, on September 28, 2008, at the age of 75. His death was announced by the Union of Bulgarian Film Makers.
