= John Freeman (poet) =

English poet and essayist (1880–1929)

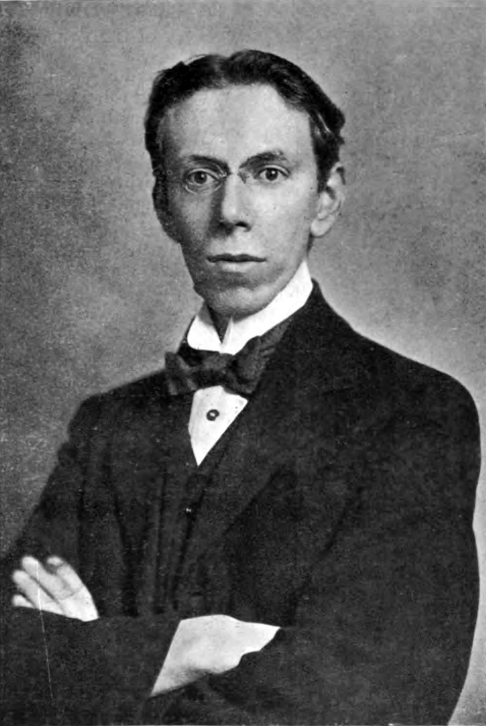

John Frederick Freeman (29 January 1880 – 23 September 1929) was an English poet and essayist, who gave up a successful career in insurance to write full-time.

He was born in London, and started as an office boy aged 13. He was a close friend of Walter de la Mare from 1907, who lobbied hard with Edward Marsh to get Freeman into the Georgian Poetry series; with eventual success. De la Mare's biographer Theresa Whistler describes him as "tall, gangling, ugly, solemn, punctilious".

He won the Hawthornden Prize in 1920 with Poems 1909-1920. His Last Hours was set to music by Ivor Gurney.

== Works ==
- Fifty Poems (1911)
- Happy is England (1914)
- Presage of Victory (1916)
- Stone Trees (1916)
- The Moderns: Essays in Literary Criticism (1917); essays on George Bernard Shaw, H. G. Wells, Thomas Hardy, Maurice Maeterlinck, Henry James, Joseph Conrad, Coventry Patmore, Francis Thompson, and Robert Bridges.
- Memories of Childhood and other Poems (1919)
- Poems 1909-1920 (1920)
- Music (1921)
- The Red Path, A Narrative, And The Wounded Bird (1921)
- A Portrait of George Moore in a Study of his Work (1922)
- The Grove and Other Poems (1925)
- Prince Absalom (1925)
- Solomon and Balkis (1926)
- Collected Poems (1928)
- Last Poems (1930)
- John Freeman's Letters (1936) posthumous; edited by Gertrude Freeman & Sir John Squire
