= Ralph Hodgson =

British writer (1871–1962)

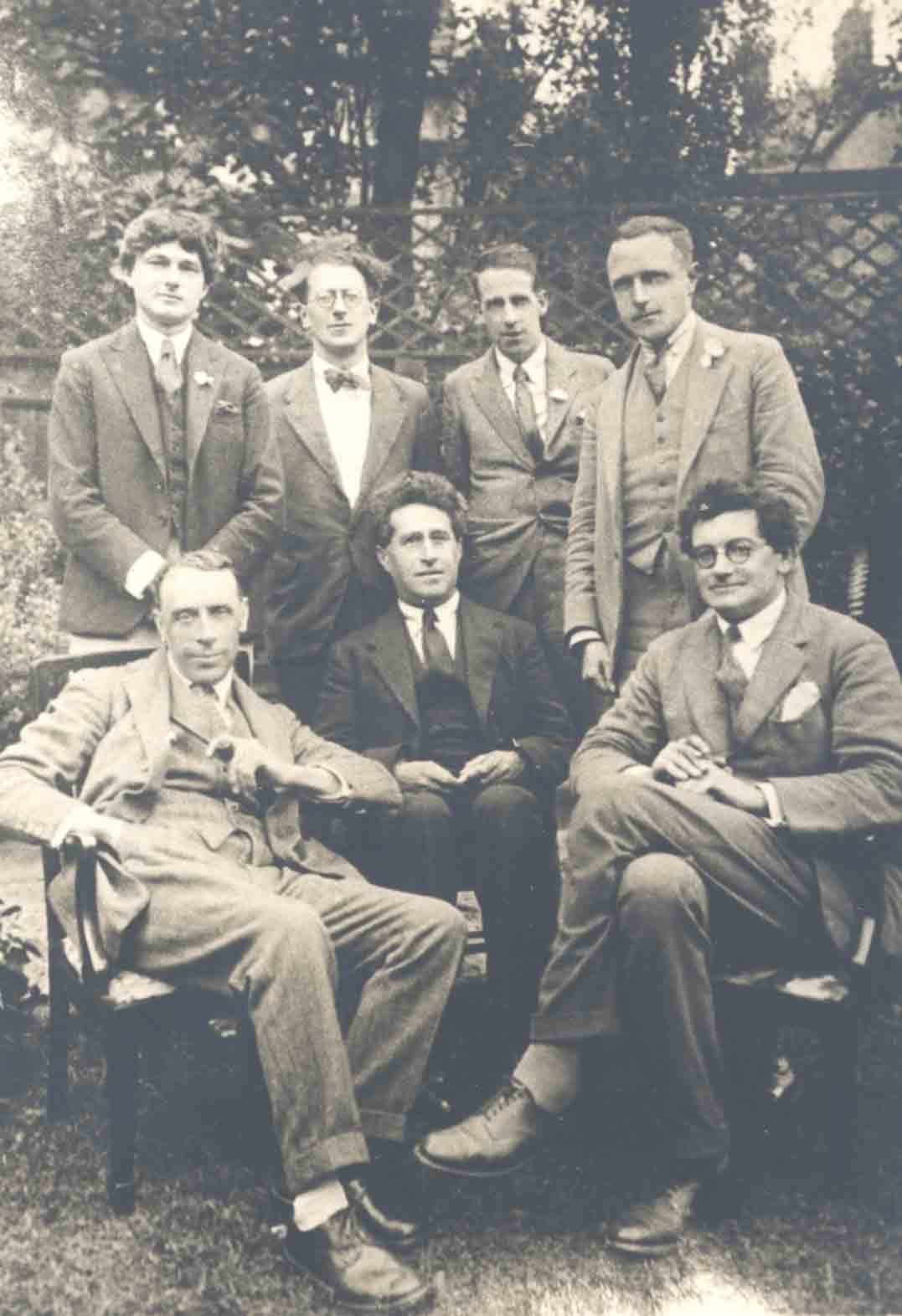
Left to right, standing: Mark Gertler, Hewy Levy, Walter J. Turner, Edward Arthur Milne; sitting: Ralph Hodgson, J. W. N. Sullivan, S. S. Koteliansky. London, 1928

Ralph Hodgson (9 September 1871 – 3 November 1962), Order of the Rising Sun (Japanese 旭日章), was an English poet, very popular in his lifetime as an early member of the Georgian School of poets, which included Rupert Brooke, Siegfried Sassoon, Walter de la Mare, Robert Graves and A. E. Housman. He shunned publicity and guarded his personal life fiercely but, at the same time, was a great, sometimes exhausting talker. He kept up a copious correspondence with other poets and literary figures, especially Siegfried Sassoon, as well as people he met in his time in Japan, such as Professor Takeshi Saito. His poem "The Bells of Heaven" was ranked 85th in the list of Classic FM's One Hundred Favourite Poems. It reflected his deep concerns with ecological matters and with cruelty to animals. One of his closest friends was Henry Salt, for whom he wrote the anti-feather-trade poem, "To Deck A Woman".

== Early life ==
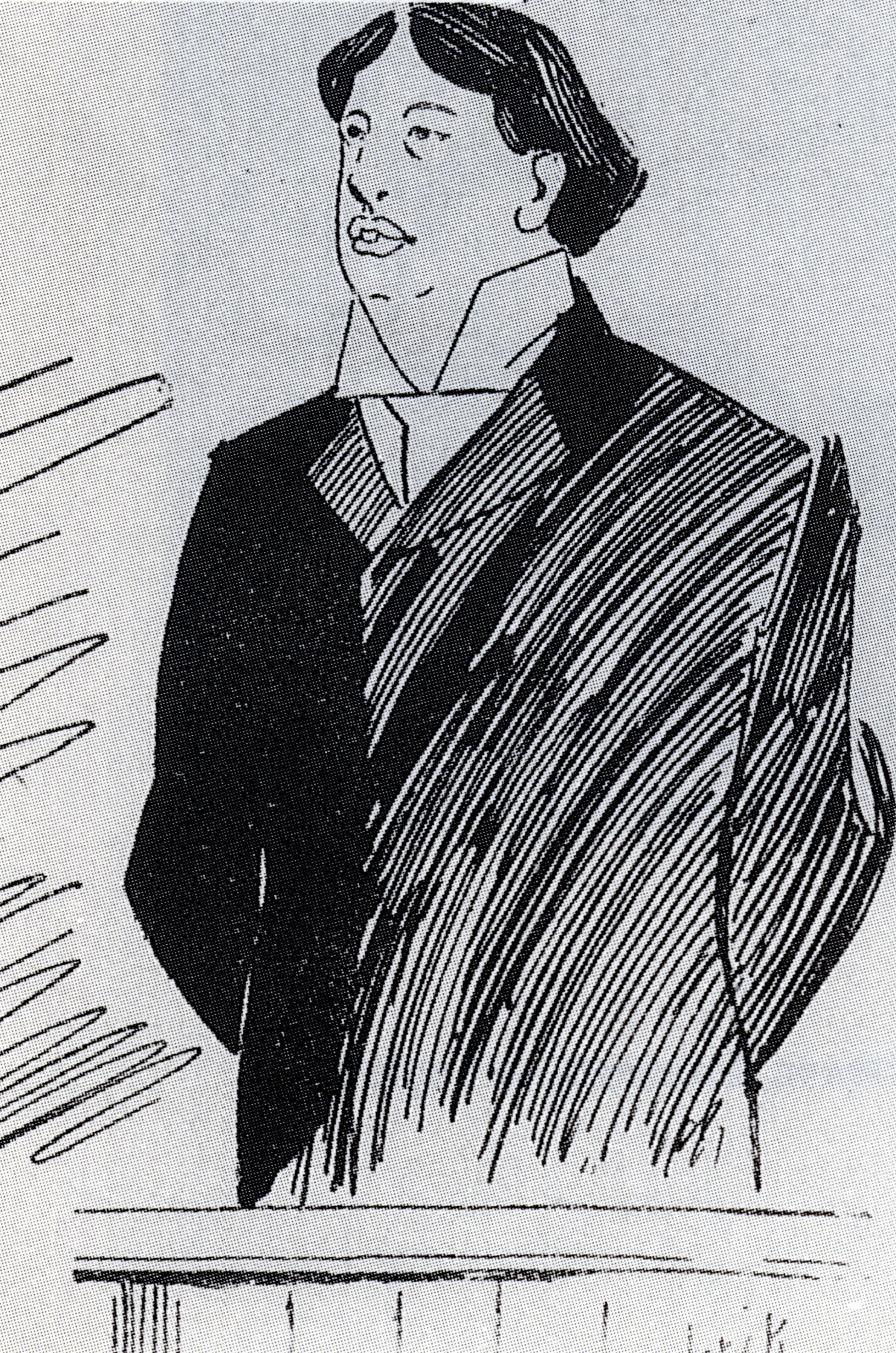
Oscar Wilde in the dock by Ralph Hodgson

He was born in Darlington in County Durham to a coal mining father. He eschewed a conventional education, and it was claimed he ran off to America as a teenager and worked in New York as a theatre designer, but there is no proof for this. While still a youth, Hodgson developed a love for bull-mastiffs and became something of an expert in their breeding and care, writing some of his first magazine articles about them. Following his brother Walter, who was a book and magazine illustrator, to London in the late 1890s, he found work as an artist on some of the early comic papers, such as Big Budget, where he first started to sign his work with the name "Yorick". He then befriended Alfred Harmsworth, who employed him as chief cartoonist on Harmsworth’s first newspaper venture, the London Evening News. He later became art editor of C. B. Fry's Weekly Magazine of Sports and Out-of-Door Life. His first poetry collection, The Last Blackbird and Other Lines, appeared in 1907.

== Poet and publisher ==
In 1912 he founded a small press, At the Sign of the Flying Fame, with the illustrator Claud Lovat Fraser (1890–1921) and the writer and journalist Holbrook Jackson (1874–1948). It published most of his popular poetry including The Bull, Eve and The Mystery. In the immediate pre-War years he presided over a luncheon table at Eustace Miles vegetarian Café where he befriended Enid Bagnold.

Hodgson received the Edmond de Polignac Prize in 1914, for a musical setting of The Song of Honour, and was included in the Georgian Poetry anthologies. The flying Fame press became inactive in 1914 as World War I broke out and he and Lovat joined the armed forces. Hodgson served first in the Royal Navy and then the Army, manning anti-aircraft guns on the East Coast of England. His poetic reputation was established by the collection Poems (1917).

His first wife Mary Janet (née Chatteris), whom he had married in 1896, died in 1920. He then married Muriel Fraser (divorced 1932). Shortly after that he accepted an invitation to teach English at Tohoku University in Sendai, Japan. In 1933 he married Lydia Aurelia Bolliger, an American missionary and teacher working in Sendai.

Hodgson had joined Edmund Blunden in Japan and the two established a close friendship during the time Blunden was writing Undertone of War. Also in Japan, Hodgson worked, almost anonymously, as part of the committee that translated the great collection of Japanese classical poetry, the Man'yōshū, into English. The high quality of the published translations is almost certainly the result of his "final revision" of the texts. It was while on furlough from the Japanese University in Sendai that he met and befriended T. S. Eliot. Eliot tried in vain to persuade Hodgson to have his poetry published by Faber and also failed in an attempt to get Hodgson (whom Eliot dubbed "The Man In White Spats") to illustrate Eliot's book of poems entitled Old Possum's Book of Practical Cats.

== Retirement in the United States ==
In 1938 Hodgson left Japan and, after visiting friends in the UK including Siegfried Sassoon (they had met in 1919), he finally settled permanently in a small farmhouse with Aurelia in Minerva, Ohio. Living in Minerva, he continued working on his long poem The Muse and the Mastiff and, with the help of Seymour Adelman, set up a small publishing venture under the Flying Scroll imprint. A new collection of his work appeared in 1959, The Skylark. His Collected Poems appeared in 1961. In 1954 he was awarded the Queen's Gold Medal for Poetry. He died in Minerva in November 1962.

== Settings ==
Arthur Bliss set some of his poems to music, as did John Dankworth and Cleo Laine.

== Quotes ==
"Some things have to be believed to be seen."
"The handwriting on the wall may be a forgery."
"Time, you old gypsy man, will you not stay, put up your caravan just for one day?"
"Did anyone ever have a boring dream?"
