= Lascelles Abercrombie =

British poet (1881–1938)

- Abercrombie in 1937.
- Born: 9 January 1881; Ashton upon Mersey, Sale, England, United Kingdom of Great Britain and Ireland
- Died: 27 October 1938 (aged 57); London, England, UK
- Education: Malvern College, Owens College
- Occupations: Journalist, lecturer

Lascelles Abercrombie (9 January 1881 – 27 October 1938) was a British poet and literary critic, one of the "Dymock poets". After the First World War he worked as a professor of English literature in a number of English universities, writing principally on the theory of literature.

== Biography ==
Abercrombie was born in Ashton upon Mersey, Sale, Cheshire. His mother, born Sarah Ann Heron, was a broad minded woman and had a sense of humour. His father, William Abercrombie, was a stock broker by profession and had the habit of reading books of eminent writers. Lascelles inherited his father's habit: "Nous" was the nickname used by his family members. He was the brother of the architect and town planner Patrick Abercrombie.

Abercrombie was educated at Malvern College, and at Owens College, Manchester.

Before the First World War, he lived for a time at Dymock in Gloucestershire, part of a community of poets, including Robert Frost, and often visited by Rupert Brooke, and Edward Thomas. The Dymock poets were included among the "Georgian poets", and Abercrombie's poetry was included in four of the five volumes of Georgian Poetry (edited by Edward Marsh, 1912–1922). During the pre-War years, he earned his living reviewing books, and started his poetry writing. His first book, Interludes and Poems (1908), was followed by Mary and the Bramble (1910) and the play Deborah, and later by Emblems of Love (1912) and Speculative Dialogues (1913). His critical works include An Essay Towards a Theory of Art (1922), and Poetry, Its Music and Meaning (1932). The Poems of Lascelles Abercrombie (1930) was followed by The Sale of St. Thomas (1930), a dramatic poem.

During World War I, he served as a munitions examiner, after which he was appointed to the first lectureship in poetry at the University of Liverpool. In 1922 he was appointed Professor of English at the University of Leeds in preference to J. R. R. Tolkien, with whom he shared, as author of The Epic (1914), a professional interest in heroic poetry. In 1929 he moved on to the University of London, and in 1935 to the prestigious Goldsmiths' Readership at the University of Oxford, where he was elected as a Fellow of Merton College. He wrote a series of works on the nature of poetry, including The Idea of Great Poetry (1925) and Romanticism (1926). He published several volumes of original verse, largely metaphysical poems in dramatic form, and a number of verse plays. Abercrombie also contributed to Georgian Poetry and several of his verse plays appeared in New Numbers (1914). His poems and plays were collected in 'The Poems of Lascelles Abercrombie' (1930).

Lascelles Abercrombie suffered in his later years from serious diabetes, and died in London in 1938, aged 57.

At the end of the Second World War, it was discovered that, despite his death, Abercrombie's name had been mistakenly included in "The Black Book" or Sonderfahndungsliste G.B. list of Britons who were to be arrested in the event of a Nazi invasion of Britain.

=== Family ===
In 1909 Abercrombie married Catherine Gwatkin (1881–1968) of Grange-over-Sands, daughter of the surgeon Owen Gwatkin, surgeon. They had a daughter and three sons. Two of the sons achieved prominence, David Abercrombie as a phonetician and Michael Abercrombie as a cell biologist. The latter's son Nicholas Abercrombie is a sociologist. A grandson, Jeffrey Cooper, produced a bibliography of his grandfather, with notes, while a great-grandson is author Joe Abercrombie.

Arthur Ransome dedicated his second children's adventure novel Swallowdale to Lascelles's daughter Elizabeth. He was a close friend of her father, Lascelles, who was often his walking/hiking companion during the 1900/1910s. He had previously dedicated his 1909 anthology, The Book of Friendship to Lascelles Abercrombie.

== Poetry and plays ==
Abercrombie's poetry consists very largely of long poems in blank verse, mainly in dramatic form. They treat the extremes of imagined rather than actual experience, from ecstasy to anguish and malice, with little in between, in verse full of sharp, gem-like imagery and generally rugged in sound and metre. Admired for a time by good judges such as Charles Williams, Oliver Elton and Una Ellis-Fermor, and respected by his fellow 'Georgian' poets, it was never popular, and by the 1930s no longer corresponded to what readers sought in modern verse.

His 'Four Short Plays' of 1922 have fared better and still receive some attention, particularly 'The Staircase', because of their more realistic characters and setting. They compare favourably to the poetic plays of the other Georgian poets, such as John Drinkwater and John Masefield.

== Archives ==
A collection of literary and other manuscripts relating to Abercrombie is held by Special Collections in the Brotherton Library at the University of Leeds. The collection contains drafts of many of Abercrombie's own publications and literary material; lecture notes, including those of his own lectures and some notes taken from the lectures of others, and a printed order of service for his Memorial Service in 1938.

Special Collections in the Brotherton Library also holds correspondence relating to Lascelles Abercrombie and his family. Comprising 105 letters, the collection contains letters of condolence to Catherine and Ralph Abercrombie on the death of Lascelles, as well as Abercrombie family letters from various correspondents, chiefly to Ralph Abercrombie.

== Works ==
Title	Year	Description
Interludes and Poems	1908	Book of poems
"Mary and the Bramble"	1910	Poem
Emblems of Love	1912	Sequence of poems
Deborah	1913	Play
Speculative Dialogues	1913	Work of prose
The End of the World	1914	Play
An Essay Towards a Theory of Art	1922	Works related to this work and an edition of this work itself available at Wikisource
The Theory of Poetry	1924	Essay
The Idea of Great Poetry	1925	Essay
Poetry, Its Music and Meaning	1932	Book
The Poems of Lascelles Abercrombie	1930	Collection of poems
"The Sale of St. Thomas"	1930	Poem
A Tower in Italy: A Legend	1976	Play
