= Walter J. Turner =

Australian-born writer (1889–1946)

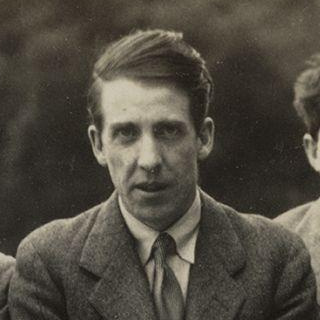
Photo by Lady Ottoline Morrell, 1926

Walter James Redfern Turner (13 October 1889 – 18 November 1946) was an Australian-born, English-domiciled writer and critic.

== Life ==
Born in South Melbourne, the son of a church musician – organist at St Paul's Cathedral – and warehouseman, Walter James Turner, and Alice May (née Watson), he was educated at Carlton State School, Scotch College and the Working Men's College. In 1907 he left for England to pursue a career in writing. There he met and befriended a number of literary intellectual figures, including Siegfried Sassoon, Virginia Woolf, Vita Sackville-West, and Lady Ottoline Morrell (the caricature of her in his book The Aesthetes ended their friendship). On 5 April 1918, in Chelsea, he married Delphine Marguerite Dubuis (died 1951). During the period from the First World War until the mid-1930s, he was known primarily as a poet. His 1916 Romance ("Chimborazo, Cotopaxi....") is probably the best remembered of his poems.

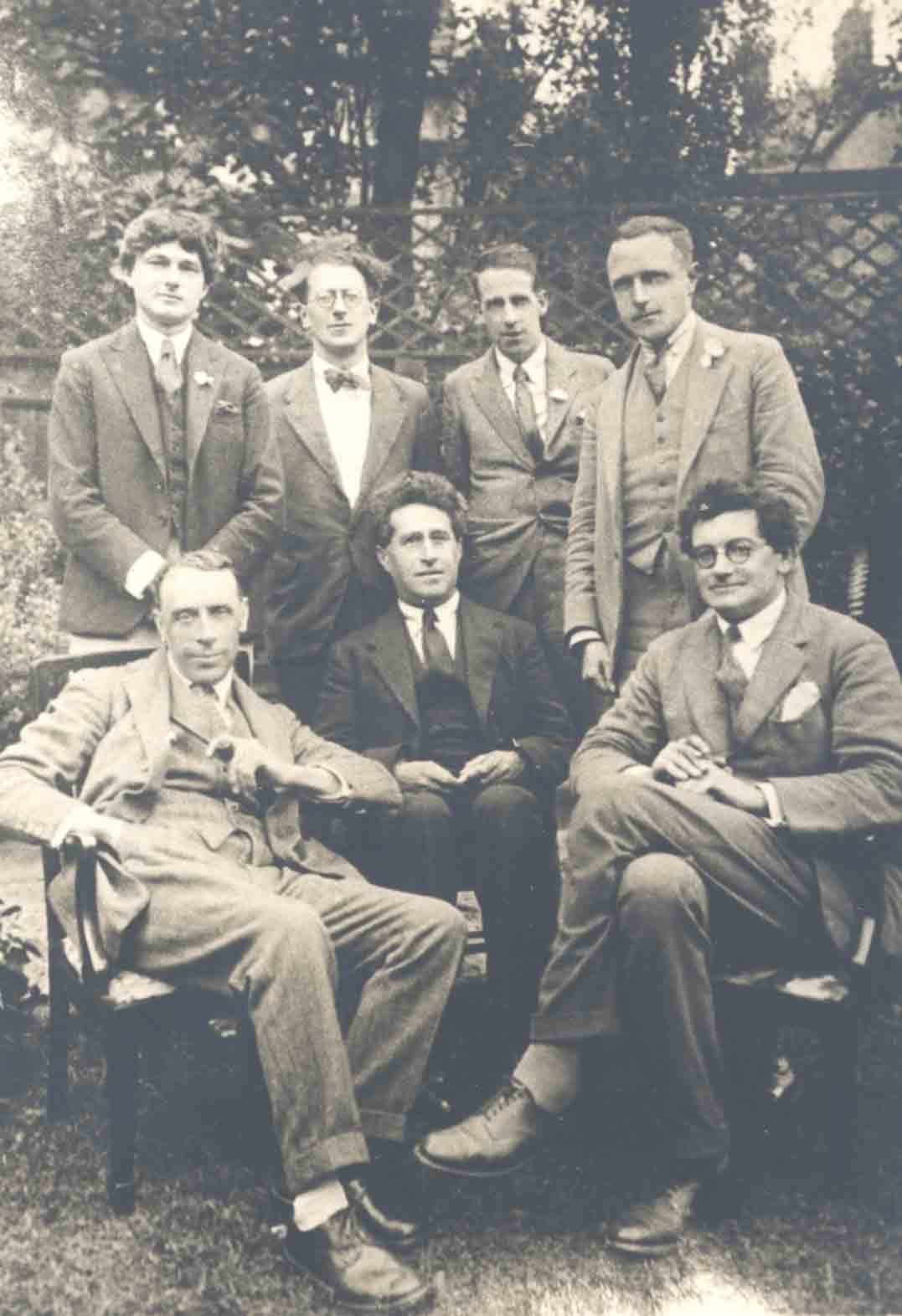
Standing, left to right: Mark Gertler, Hewy Levy, Walter J. Turner, Alan Milne. Seated, left to right: Ralph Hodgson, S. S. Koteliansky and J.W.N. Sullivan (1928)

W. B. Yeats had the highest praise for Turner's poetry, saying that it left him "lost in admiration and astonishment", and included some of it in his Oxford Book of Modern Poetry (while omitting several authors very much better known today for their verse, such as Wilfred Owen). But today, although Turner produced several novels and plays, as well as books of poems, his reputation rests on his biographies of the composers Mozart, Beethoven and Berlioz. His Mozart has been reprinted many times since it was first published in 1938. Some of his music articles for the New Statesman (where he was music critic between 1915 and 1940) and other journals were reprinted in Music and Life, Facing the Music, Musical Meanderings, and Variations on the theme of Music.

Turner was musically untrained, and in the words of the music critic Charles Reid, "unhampered by any excess of technical knowledge" to restrain his "racy dogmatism". Notoriously, on the fiftieth anniversary of Richard Wagner's death, he wrote: “I can confidently and in soberness declare that Wagner is a colossal fraud.”

Turner was a champion of Arturo Toscanini's conducting, which was for him a revelation in structure and expression. Siegfried Sassoon was another close friend of Turner, at least for a while. Turner, his wife, and Sassoon all cohabited a house in London, No 54 Tufton Street, before Sassoon moved out in 1925. After this he fell out with Turner so badly that he made no mention whatsoever of him in his autobiography. During the Second World War, he was general editor of the series of short illustrated books "Britain in Pictures", for which he wrote the volumes on music and ballet, and edited seven omnibus volumes. On 18 November 1946 he died at Hammersmith of a cerebral thrombosis.

== Works ==
=== Poetry ===
- The Hunter and other Poems (1916)
- The Dark Fire (1918)
- The Dark Wind (1920) this was a compilation of poems from The Hunter, The Dark Fire, and In Time Like Glass published in America.
- In Time Like Glass (1921)
- Paris and Helen (1921)
- Landscape of Cytherea (Record of a Journey into a Strange Country) (1923)
- The Seven Days of the Sun (1925)
- Marigold: An Idyll of the Sea (1926)
- New Poems (1928)
- Miss America (1930)
- Pursuit of Psyche (1931)
- Jack and Jill (1934)
- Songs and Incantations (1936) which included his Seven Sciagraphical Poems
- Selected Poems 1916–36 (1939)
- Fossils of a Future Time? (1946)
- Romance (1946)

=== Plays ===
- The Man Who Ate the Popomack (1921)
- Smaragda's lover (1925)
- Jupiter Translated (unpublished; first performed 1933)

=== Other books ===
- Music and life (1921)
- Variations on the theme of music (1924)
- Orpheus; or, The music of the future (1926)
- Beethoven, the search for reality (1927)
- Musical meanderings (1928)
- A trip to New York and a poem (1929)
- Eighteenth century poetry : an anthology chosen by W.J. Turner (1931)
- Wagner (1933)
- Facing the Music: Reflections of a Music Critic (1933)
- Berlioz: The Man and His Work (1934)
- Blow for Balloons (1935) Novel.
- Mozart, the man and his works (1938)
- The Duchess of Popocatapetl (1939) Novel.
- English Music (1941; "Britain in Pictures", no. 3)
- Fables, Parables and Plots: Revolutionary Stories for the Young and Old (1943)
- The English Ballet (1944; "Britain in Pictures", no. 80)
- A Treasury of English wild life edited by W.J. Turner (1946)
- Music, a short history (949)

== See also ==
- Walter Turner is also the name of a Solenostemon scutellarioides cultivar
