= Edward Marsh (polymath) =

British polymath (1872–1953)

Sir Edward Howard Marsh KCVO CB CMG (18 November 1872 – 13 January 1953) was a British polymath, translator, arts patron and civil servant. He was the sponsor of the Georgian school of poets and a friend to many poets, including Rupert Brooke and Siegfried Sassoon. In his career as a civil servant he worked as private secretary to a succession of the United Kingdom's most powerful ministers, particularly Winston Churchill. He was a discreet but influential figure within Britain's homosexual community.

== Early life ==
Marsh's father was Howard Marsh, a surgeon and later Master of Downing College, Cambridge. His mother, born Jane Perceval, was a granddaughter of prime minister Spencer Perceval, and a daughter of Spencer Perceval, MP, one of the twelve "apostles" recognized by the movement associated with Edward Irving and known as the Catholic Apostolic Church. Jane, a nurse, was one of the founders of the Alexandra Hospital for Children with Hip Disease; Howard was a surgeon at the hospital. Marsh was educated at Westminster School, London, and Trinity College, Cambridge, where he studied classics under Arthur Woollgar Verrall. At Cambridge, he became associated with R. C. Trevelyan, Bertrand Russell, G. E. Moore, and Maurice Baring. He was a Cambridge Apostle.

== Civil servant ==
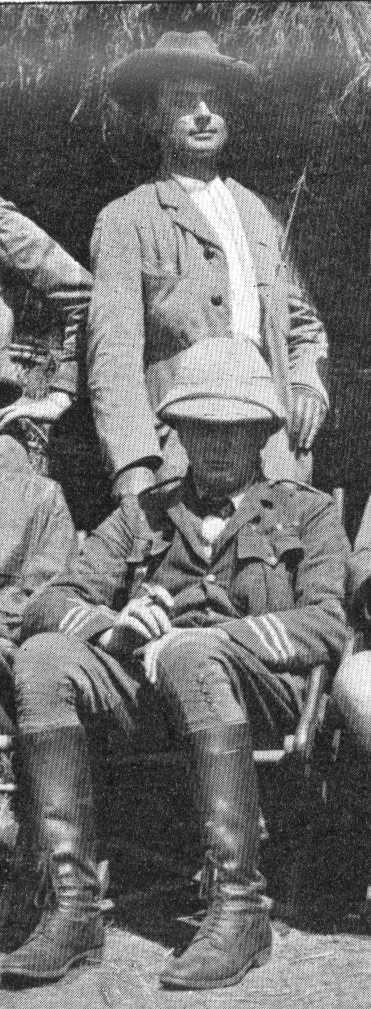
Edward Marsh (standing) together with Winston Churchill during an African journey in 1907.

In 1896 he was appointed Assistant Private Secretary to Joseph Chamberlain, the Colonial Secretary. When Chamberlain resigned in 1903, Marsh became Private Secretary to his successor, Alfred Lyttelton. When Winston Churchill became Under-Secretary of State for the Colonies in 1905 during Henry Campbell-Bannerman's first Government, Marsh became Churchill's Private Secretary, beginning an association and friendship that would last until Marsh's death. Marsh would be Churchill's Private Secretary for the next ten years, until Churchill left the Government in 1915. As Randolph Churchill, Winston's son put it, from December 1905, "Marsh was to accompany Churchill to every Government department he occupied: to the Board of Trade, the Home Office, the Admiralty, the Duchy of Lancaster, the Ministry of Munitions, the War Office, back to his original Colonial Office and the Treasury." The moves were somewhat irregular as Marsh remained, until 1937, officially a clerk at the Colonial Office, but many exceptions were made, possibly at a cost to Marsh's official advancement.

When Churchill left government for the first time in 1915, Marsh became Assistant Private Secretary to Prime Minister H. H. Asquith in which position he served until the fall of Asquith's government in December 1916. When Churchill returned to government as Minister of Munitions in 1916, Marsh joined him there as Private Secretary and worked in that position through successive departments until the fall of David Lloyd George's Coalition Government in 1922. When Churchill became Chancellor of the Exchequer in 1924, Marsh joined him there as Private Secretary and remained at the Treasury until the fall of Stanley Baldwin's second government in 1929, when Marsh was returned to work at the Colonial Office. He then served as Private Secretary to every Secretary of State for the Colonies from 1929 until his retirement in 1937. Marsh was knighted upon his retirement and became Sir Edward Marsh.

== Literary career ==
A classical scholar and translator, Marsh edited five anthologies of Georgian Poetry between 1912 and 1922, and he became Rupert Brooke's literary executor, editing his Collected Poems in 1918. Later in life he published verse translations of La Fontaine and Horace, and a translation of Eugène Fromentin's novel Dominique.

The sales of the first three Georgian Poetry anthologies were impressive, ranging between 15,000 and 19,000 copies apiece. Marsh and the critic J. C. Squire were the group's most important patrons, and it was in Marsh's London rooms that Siegfried Sassoon and Rupert Brooke met for the only time, in June 1914. In 1931, he won a literary contest with a new stanza for Paradise Lost, which repairs the omission of how "Adam and Eve Brush Their Teeth". In 1939, he produced his memoirs, titled A Number of People. An edited collection of letters, Ambrosia and Small Beer, appeared in 1964, recording two decades of correspondence with his friend and biographer, Christopher Hassall.

Marsh advised Somerset Maugham about his writing between 1935 and 1953 with hundreds of pages of criticism. This is recorded in Ted Morgan's biography of Maugham (1980).

Marsh was also a consistent collector and supporter of the works of the avant-garde artists Mark Gertler, Duncan Grant, David Bomberg and Paul Nash, all of whom were also associated with the Bloomsbury Group.

In addition to his work editing Churchill's writing, Marsh introduced Siegfried Sassoon to Churchill as a means of aiding the former's career. He was also a close friend and lover of Ivor Novello.

== Sources ==
- Gilbert, Martin. Winston S. Churchill: The Challenge of War 1914–1916.(c) (1971) C&T Publications, Ltd.
- Gilbert, Martin. Winston S. Churchill: The Stricken World 1916–1922.(c) (1975) C&T Publications, Ltd., etc.
- Churchill, Randolph S., and Martin Gilbert. (1966). Winston S. Churchill. London: Heinemann.
- Gilbert, Martin. (1992). Churchill: A Life. 1st Owl book ed. New York: Holt.
- Hassall, Christopher. (1959). Edward Marsh: Patron of the Arts. A Biography. London: Longmans; US edition: A Biography of Edward Marsh. New York: Harcourt, Brace.
- Hassall, Christopher, Denis Mathews, and Winston Churchill. (1953). Eddie Marsh: Sketches for a Composite Literary Portrait of Sir Edward Marsh. London: Lund Humphries.
- La Fontaine, Jean de, Edward Howard Marsh, and Stephen Gooden. (1931). The Fables of Jean de La Fontaine. London: New York: Heinemann; Random House.
- Marsh, Edward Howard. (1939). A Number of People: A Book of Reminiscences. New York, London: Harper & brothers.
- Marsh, Edward Howard, and Christopher Hassall. (1964). Ambrosia and Small Beer: The Record of a Correspondence between Edward Marsh and Christopher Hassall. London: Longmans; US edition: New York: Harcourt, Brace & World.
- Schroder, John, and Joan Hassall. (1970). Catalogue of Books and Manuscripts by Rupert Brooke, Edward Marsh & Christopher Hassall. Cambridge: Rampant Lions Press.
