= 1914 in poetry =

They went with songs to the battle, they were young.
Straight of limb, true of eyes, steady and aglow.
They were staunch to the end against odds uncounted,
They fell with their faces to the foe.

They shall grow not old, as we that are left grow old:
Age shall not weary them, nor the years condemn.

At the going down of the sun and in the morning,

We will remember them.

— "Ode of Remembrance", an ode taken from Laurence Binyon's "For the Fallen", first published in The Times of London in September of this year.

This article covers 1914 in poetry. Nationality words link to articles with information on the nation's poetry or literature (for instance, Irish or France).

== Events ==
The cover of the first edition of the literary magazine BLAST

- January 1 – The Egoist, a London literary magazine is founded by Dora Marsden, a successor to The New Freewoman (the new publication will go defunct in 1919); it publishes early modernist works, including those of James Joyce
- January 18 – A party held in honor of English poet Wilfrid Scawen Blunt at his stud farm in West Sussex brings together W. B. Yeats, Ezra Pound, Thomas Sturge Moore, Victor Plarr, Richard Aldington, F. S. Flint and Frederic Manning; peacock is on the menu
- January 29 – Yone Noguchi lectures on "The Japanese Hokku Poetry" at Magdalen College, Oxford
- March 4 (dated February) – Publication of the first issue of New Numbers, a quarterly collection of work by the Dymock poets in England edited by Lascelles Abercrombie with Wilfrid Gibson; the only other issues are published on May 15 (dated April), about the beginning of October (dated August) and on February 27, 1915 (dated December 1914)
- March – The Little Review founded by Margaret Caroline Anderson as part of Chicago's literary renaissance
- April 3 – American poet Robert Frost moves to the rural English location of Dymock where he joins with the Dymock poets
- April 20 – American poet Ezra Pound marries English artist Dorothy Shakespear at St Mary Abbots church, Kensington, London
- June 5 – Rupert Brooke returns to England at Plymouth after a year's tour of North America and Tahiti and on June 23 joins with the Dymock poets and helps with New Numbers
- June 24 – Edward Thomas makes the English railway journey which inspires his poem "Adlestrop" en route to meet Robert Frost, who encourages him to begin writing poetry
- July 2 – BLAST, a short-lived literary magazine of the Vorticist movement, is founded with the publication of the first of its total of two editions, edited by Wyndham Lewis
- August – The literature of World War I makes its first appearance. John Masefield writes the poem "August, 1914" (published in the September 1 issue of The English Review), the last he will produce before the peace.
- September – J. R. R. Tolkien writes a poem about Eärendil, the first appearance of his mythopoeic Middle-earth legendarium. At this time Tolkien is an Oxford undergraduate staying at Phoenix Farm, Gedling near Nottingham.
- September 22 – T. S. Eliot (at this time in England to study) meets Ezra Pound for the first time, in London
- December – Wilhelm Apollinaris de Kostrowitzky, who writes under the pen name "Guillaume Apollinaire", enlists in the French Army to fight in World War I and becomes a French citizen after an August attempt at enlistment has been rejected
- December 3 – Edward Thomas, previously known as a writer of descriptive prose, writes his first mature poem, "Up in the Wind"
- December 23 – Rupert Brooke begins writing his sonnet "The Soldier" while on military training
- Jethmal Parsram and Lalchand Amardinomal Jagatiani, both aged around 29, found the Sindhi Sahita Society, a publishing house, in India

== Works published in English ==
=== Australia ===
- Will Lawson, The Three Kings and Other Verses
- Dorothea Mackellar, The Witch-Maid and Other Verses

=== Canada ===
- William Wilfred Campbell, Sagas of Vaster Britain
- Katherine Hale, Grey Knitting
- Marian Osborne, Poems, Canadian poet published in the United Kingdom
- George A. MacKenzie, In that New World Which is the Old
- Laura E. McCulley, Mary Magdalene and Other Poems, 50 poems; her first book of poetry
- Beatrice Redpath, Drawn Shutters, her first book
- Lloyd Roberts, England Over Seas
- Arthur Stringer, Open Water, London: John Lane Co. (free verse Canadian poetry

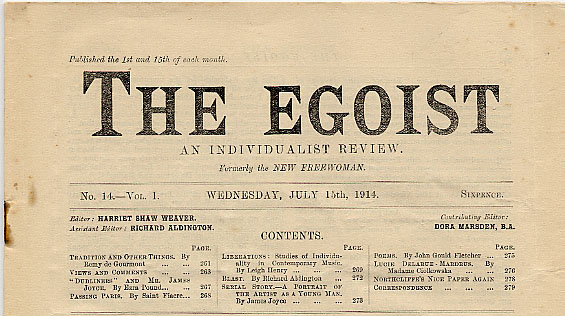
The Egoist founded

=== United Kingdom ===
- Laurence Binyon, The Winnowing-Fan, including "For the Fallen", part of which is excerpted to become "Ode of Remembrance" (written at Pentire Head, Cornwall, and originally published in The Times (London) September 21)
- Wilfrid Scawen Blunt, Poetical Works
- W. H. Davies, The Bird of Paradise, and Other Poems
- Wilfrid Gibson
  - Borderlands
  - Thoroughfares
- Thomas Hardy
  - Satires of Circumstance (including the sequence "Poems 1912–13")
  - "Men Who March Away" (September 5, published as "Song of the Soldiers" in The Times (London) September 9)
- Ford Madox Hueffer, Collected Poems
- John Masefield, Philip the King, and Other Poems
- Marian Osborne, Poems, Canadian poet published in the United Kingdom
- Ezra Pound, editor, Des Imagistes: An Anthology, the first anthology of the Imagism movement; published by the Poetry Bookshop in London and issued in America both in book form and simultaneously in the literary periodical The Glebe for February 1914 (issue #5)
- Arthur Knowles Sabin, War Harvest, 1914
- Katharine Tynan, The Flower of Peace
- W. B. Yeats, Responsibilities, Irish poet published in the United Kingdom

=== United States ===
- Conrad Aiken, Earth Triumphant
- Emily Dickinson, The Single Hound, published posthumously (died 1886)
- Robert Frost, North of Boston, including "Mending Wall", American poet resident and published in the UK
- Joyce Kilmer, Trees and Other Poems, including "Trees", which first appeared in Poetry magazine in August 1913)
- Ezra Pound, editor, Des Imagistes: An Anthology, the first anthology of the Imagism movement; published by the Poetry Bookshop in London and issued in America both in book form and simultaneously in the literary periodical The Glebe for February 1914 (issue #5)
- Vachel Lindsay, The Congo and Other Poems
- Amy Lowell, Sword Blades and Poppy Seed
- James Oppenheim, Songs for the New Age
- Carl Sandburg, "Chicago" in Poetry magazine
- Gertrude Stein, Tender Buttons
- Wallace Stevens' first major publication (of his poem "Phases") is in the November issue of Poetry The poem was written when Stevens was 35, and he is a rare example of a poet whose main output came at a fairly advanced age. (Many of his canonical works were written well after he turned fifty.) According to the literary critic Harold Bloom, no Western writer since Sophocles has had such a late flowering of artistic genius.

=== Other in English ===
- Prafulla Ranjan Das, The Mother and the Star; Indian, Indian poetry in English
- W. B. Yeats, Responsibilities, Irish poet published in the United Kingdom

== Works published in other languages ==
=== Indian ===
- Narasinghrao, Nupurjhankar (Indian, writing in Gujarati)

==== Telugu language ====
- Kattamanci Ramalinga Reddi, Kavitya Tattva Vicaramu, criticism
- Ramalinga Reddi / Kattamanci Ramalinga Reddi, Kavitya Tattva Vicaramu, book of criticism, called a "very controversial" and "scathing critique of traditional poetry" and also a "pioneering work in modern Telugu criticism"
- Burra Seshagiri Rao, Vimarsadarsamu, book partly about the relationship between poetry and society

=== Other languages ===
- Anna Akhmatova, The Rosary, Russia, her second collection; by this time there are thousands of women composing their poems "after Akhmatova"; the book becomes so popular in Russia that a "parlor game based upon the book was even invented. One person would recite a line of poetry and the next person would try to recite the next, until the entire book was recited."
- Julius Bab, ed., 1914: der deutsche Krieg im deutschen Gedicht, Germany
- José Santos Chocano, Puerto Rico lírico y otros poemas, Peru
- Janus Djurhuus, Yrkingar, Faroese
- Walter Flex, Das Volk in Eisen, Germany
- Krishnala M. Jhaveri, Milestones in Gujarati Literature written in English and translated into Gujarati; scholarship and criticism in (India)
- Vasily Kamensky, Tango with Cows: Ferro-Concrete Poems (Танго С Коровами: Железобетонныя Поэмы), Russia
- Ernst Lissauer, "Song of Hate against England" (Hassgesang gegen England), Germany
- Stéphane Mallarmé, Un Coup de dés jamais n'abolira le hasard ("A Throw of the Dice will Never Abolish Chance"), originally published in Cosmopolis magazine in 1897, posthumously published in book form for the first time, in a limited, 60-copy edition by the Imprimerie Sainte Catherine at Bruges, Belgium
- Gabriela Mistral, Sonetos de la muerte ("Sonnets of Death"), Chile
- Patrick Pearse, Suantraidhe agus Goltraidhe (Songs of Sleep and of Sorrow), Ireland
- Rainer Maria Rilke, Fünf Gesänge, August 1914 ("Five Hymns, August 1914"), written, Germany
- Ernst Stadler, Der Aufbruch ("The Departure"), this German poet's most important volume of verse, regarded as a key work of early Expressionism; he is killed in battle this year
- Georg Trakl, "Grodek", Austria, posthumously published in Der Brenner

== Births ==
Death years link to the corresponding "[year] in poetry" article:

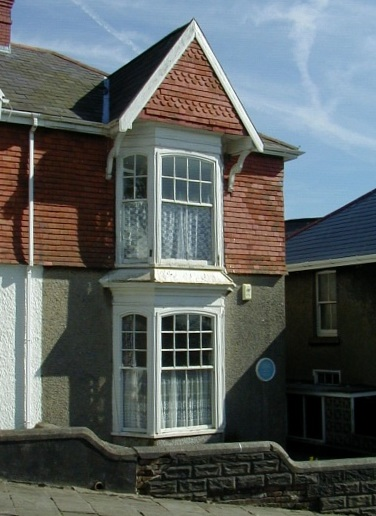
Birthplace of Dylan Thomas

- January 14 – Dudley Randall (died 2000) African American poet and poetry publisher, founding Broadside Press in 1965
- January 17 – William Stafford (died 1993), American poet
- February 7 – David Ignatow (died 1997), American poet
- February 14 – Jan Nisar Akhtar (died 1976) Indian poet of Urdu ghazals and nazms and lyricist for Bollywood
- February 22 – Henry Reed (died 1986), English poet
- February 24 – Weldon Kees (missing, presumed dead 1955), American poet, critic, novelist, short story writer, composer and artist
- February 25 – John Arlott (died 1991), English cricket commentator and poet
- March 31 – Octavio Paz (died 1998) Mexican writer, poet and diplomat, winner of the Nobel Prize in Literature in 1990
- April 13 – Orhan Veli Kanik (died 1950), Turkish poet.
- May 3 – Georges-Emmanuel Clancier (died 2018), French poet, novelist, broadcaster and journalist
- May 6 – Randall Jarrell (died 1965), American poet and writer
- June 2 - George Hitchcock (died 2010), American poet, editor and publisher of Kayak magazine and books (1964–1984)
- June 26 – Laurie Lee (died 1997), English memoirist and poet
- September 1 – Jean Burden (died 2008), American poet, editor, essayist and pet-care writer
- September 5 – Nicanor Parra (died 2018), Chilean poet and physicist
- September 29 – D. J. Opperman (died 1985), South African Afrikaans poet
- July 30 – Tachihara Michizō 立原道造 (died 1939), Japanese poet and architect
- October 25 – John Berryman (born John Allyn Smith) (died 1972) American poet considered one of the founders of the Confessional school of poetry
- October 27 – Dylan Thomas (died 1953), Welsh poet
- October 30 – James Laughlin (died 1997), American poet and literary book publisher, founder of New Directions Publishers
- November 1 – Yamazaki Hōdai 山崎方代 (died 1985), Japanese Shōwa period tanka poet (family name: Yamazaki)
- December 3 – Alaíde Foppa, (disappeared, presumed killed 1980), Spanish-born Latin American poet, scholar and activist
- Also:
  - Punkunnam Damodaran, Indian, Malayalam-language poet and playwright
  - Devakanta Barua, Indian, Assamese-language poet
  - G. V. Krishna Rao (died 1979), Indian, Telugu-language poet and novelist
  - Ghulam Ahmad Fazil Kashmiri (died 2004), also known as "Fazil Kashmiri", Indian, Kashmiri-language poet (surname: Fazil)
  - Kunjabihari Das, Indian, Orissa-language poet, folklorist, travel writer and memoirist
  - Laksmidhar Nayak, Indian, Oriya playwright, novelist, poet and labor leader
  - Narayan Bezbarua, Indian, Assamese-language poet, novelist and playwright
  - Narmada Prasad Khare, Indian, Hindi-language poet and editor

== Deaths ==
Birth years link to the corresponding "[year] in poetry" article:

- January 13 – John Philip Bourke, 56 (born 1860), Australian poet
- March 17 – Hiraide Shū 平出修, 35 (born 1878), Japanese late Meiji period novelist, poet and lawyer; represented defendant in the High Treason Incident; co-founder of the literary journal Subaru
- March 25 – Frédéric Mistral, 83 (born 1830), French Occitan language writer and poet
- June 3 – Danske Dandridge, 59 (born 1854), American poet
- July 6 – Delmira Agustini, 27 (born 1886), Uruguayan poet, murdered
- July 23 – Charlotte Forten Grimké, 76 (born 1837), African-American anti-slavery activist, poet and teacher
- September 2 – K. C. Kesava Pillai, 46 (born 1868), Indian, Malayalam-language musician and poet
- September 4 – Charles Péguy, 41 (born 1873), French poet and essayist, killed in action near Villeroy, Seine-et-Marne, in the early months of World War I
- September 8 – Hans Leybold, 22 (born 1892), German Expressionist poet, suicide while on active service in Belgium
- September 22 – Kerala Varma Valiya Koil Thampuran, also known as Kerala Varma, 69 (born 1845 in poetry), Indian, Malayalam-language poet and translator who had an equal facility in writing in English and Sanskrit, automobile accident
- September 25 – Alfred Lichtenstein, 25 (born 1889), German Expressionist writer, killed in action in France
- October 8 – Adelaide Crapsey, 26 (born 1878), American poet, tuberculous meningitis
- October 10 – Ernst Stadler, 31 (born 1883), German poet, killed in battle at Zandvoorde near Ypres
- November 3 – Georg Trakl, 27 (born 1887), Austrian poet, suicide
- December 8 – Madison Cawein, 49 (born 1865), American poet
- December 19 – Jane Elizabeth Conklin, 83 (born 1831), American poet and religious writer

== See also ==
- List of years in poetry
- Dada
- Dymock poets
- Imagism
- Modernist poetry in English
- Russian Futurism movement in Russian poetry
- Silver Age of Russian Poetry
- Ego-Futurism movement in Russian poetry
- Expressionism movement in German poetry
- Young Poland (Polish: Młoda Polska) modernist period in Polish arts and literature
- Poetry
