= Alfred Kreymborg =

American poet, novelist, playwright, literary editor and anthologist

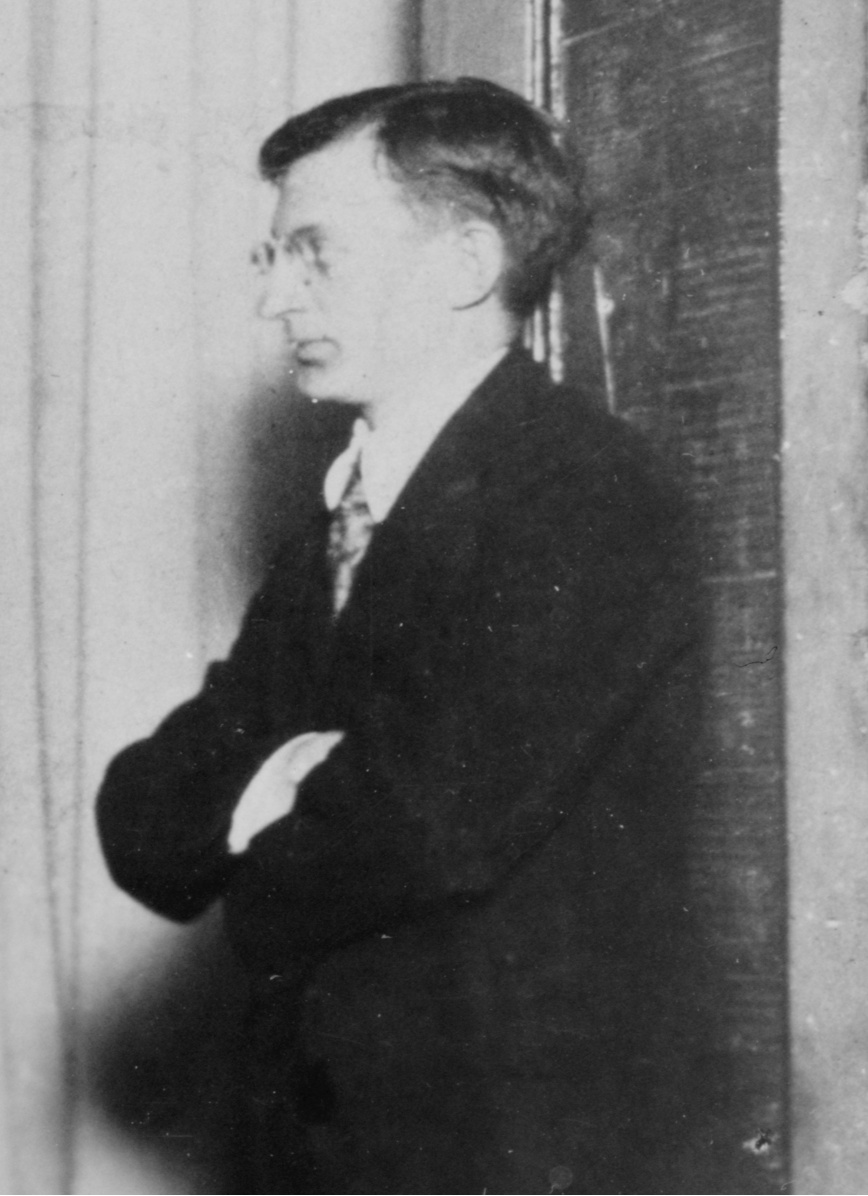
Alfred Kreymborg, circa 1917.

Alfred Francis Kreymborg (December 10, 1883 – August 14, 1966) was an American poet, novelist, playwright, literary editor and anthologist.

== Early life and associations ==
He was born in New York City to Hermann and Louisa Kreymborg (née Nasher), who ran a small cigar store, and he spent most of his life there and in New Jersey. He was an active figure in Greenwich Village and frequented the Liberal Club.

He was the first literary figure to be included in Alfred Stieglitz's 291 circle, and was briefly associated with the Ferrer Center where Man Ray was studying under Robert Henri. From 1913 to 1914, Kreymborg and Man Ray worked together to bring out ten issues of the first of Kreymborg's prominent modernist magazines: The Glebe. Ezra Pound – who had heard about The Glebe from Kreymborg's friend John Cournos – sent Kreymborg the manuscript of Des Imagistes in the summer of 1913 and this famous first anthology of Imagism was published as the fifth issue of The Glebe

The cover of the first edition of Kreymborg's Mushrooms (1916): a book of free verse tone-poems

In 1913 Man Ray and Samuel Halpert, another of Henri's students, started an artist's colony in Ridgefield, New Jersey. This colony was often also referred to as 'Grantwood' and comprised a number of clapboard shacks on a bluff on the Hudson Palisades opposite Grants Tomb, across the Hudson River in Manhattan. Kreymborg moved to Ridgefield and launched Others: A Magazine of the New Verse with Skipwith Cannell, Wallace Stevens, and William Carlos Williams in 1915. Pound had, along with the Des Imagistes poems, written to Kreymborg suggesting that he contact 'old Bull' Williams, that is William Carlos Williams. Williams did not live far from Ridgefield, and he became involved in the magazine. Soon there was a group of artists associated with the magazine. Marianne Moore came to Ridgefield for picnics, and from 1915 Marcel Duchamp occasionally visited. Regarding Marianne Moore, when asked whether Kreymborg was her American discoverer, she replied, "It could be said, perhaps; he did all he could to promote me. Miss Monroe and the Aldingtons had asked me simultaneously to contribute to Poetry and The Egoist in 1915. Alfred Kreymborg was not inhibited. I was a little different from the others. He thought that I might pass as a novelty, I guess."

1915 also saw the publication of a story in part based on a personal experience. The story was titled 'Edna' and published as Edna: The Girl of the Street; by the Greenwich Village entrepreneur Guido Bruno; the subtitle was Bruno's idea, added without the consent of the author. John S. Sumner of the New York Society for the Suppression of Vice raised a stir; there was a court case which led to Bruno's imprisonment. The attendant morals row drew in George Bernard Shaw and Frank Harris: Harris made an impassioned statement in court defending the publisher.

Kreymborg was lifelong friends with Carl Sandburg, each independently choosing to write in free verse. Kreymborg's poems, or 'mushrooms', had seldom made it into print, but in 1916, soon after his move to Ridgefield they were brought out in book form by John Marshall as 'Mushrooms: A Book of Free Forms' and Williams praised them as a "triumph for America". (Note: According to Symons (1987), pp. 122, 127, the 'Mushrooms' had been "unpublishable", although this does not seem quite fair as the acknowledgements page thanks the editors of The New Republic, The Poetry Journal, Poetry: A Magazine of Verse, Others: A Magazine of the New Verse, The Egoist, Catholic Anthology, Bruno Chap Books, Greenwich Village and Rogue.)

Kreymborg spent a year touring the United States, mostly visiting universities, reading his poetry — including at The Sunwise Turn in New York, an early supporter of his work — while accompanying himself on a mandolute.

== 1920s ==
Kreymborg continued to edit Others somewhat erratically until 1919; he then in June 1921 sailed to Europe to act as co-editor of Broom, An International Magazine of the Arts (along with Harold Loeb). Contributors included Malcolm Cowley, E. E. Cummings, Amy Lowell and Walter de la Mare. The magazine lost money. Kreymborg soon resigned and the magazine ceased publication in 1924. An ironic anecdote on the status of modernism: Kreymborg arranged for an aspiring artist Fernand Léger to create the artwork for the cover of volume 2, number 4 of Broom. When Broom ceased publication, the original painting was left behind for its next tenants. Original works by Léger from that time period have sold for several million dollars.

Kreymborg's poems appeared in The Dial in 1923. (Note: His 'Six Movements' appeared in Volume 75 No.5 (November 1923). Symons (1987), p. 152 indicates that his work appeared in early 1921, but the only mention of Kreymborg in the contents for that period is for a comment on the forthcoming Broom in Issue Volume 70 No.5 May 1921.)

In the summer of 1925, Kreymborg was staying in Lake George Village, and happened to meet Paul Rosenfeld who was staying with Stieglitz. In one late night discussion Kreymborg and Rosenfeld lamented the disappearance of various literary magazines, including Broom. Another neighbor, Samuel Ornitz appeared and offered financial backing for an annual book of new writing. Thus Kreymborg and Rosenfeld founded American Caravan, which was to be edited by Lewis Mumford and Van Wyck Brooks. The Second American Caravan, was edited by Kreymborg, Mumford, and Rosenfeld; it was reviewed the December 1928 issue of The Dial.

1925 also saw the publication of his autobiography Troubadour, in which he refers to himself in the third person by the nicknames "Ollie" and "Krimmie". Among other things, the book narrates Kreymborg's courtship of and marriage to Gertrude Lord ("Christine") and their amicable separation one year later on account of Gertrude's attachment to the American artist Carl Schmitt ("Charles"). (His play "The Silent Waiter," loosely based on his first marriage, was performed by NYC's Metropolitan Playhouse in a virtual livestreamed production on March 13, 2021, with commentary.) It also tells of his second marriage to Dorothy ("Dot") Bloom.

In 1929, Random House chose him to be one of the poets to appear in The Poetry Quartos, proposed by Paul Johnston. Kreymborg contributed the poem "Body and Stone." He also contributed a short story to The Prose Quartos, published by Random House in 1930.

== 1930s and later ==
In 1938 Kreymborg's verse drama for radio The Planets: A Modern Allegory was broadcast by NBC and received such an enthusiastic response from the public that it was repeated a few weeks later.

Kreymborg maintained a long-term connection with Alfred Stieglitz primarily because of Kreymborg's relationship with Hugo Knudsen, who invented some of the early photo-printing processes that Stieglitz utilized. Knudsen and Kreymborg married sisters Beatrice (Bea) and Dot Bloom (respectively).

== Other interests ==
He also wrote puppet plays (his most famous being Manikin Minikin and Lima Beans), which he performed with his wife, Dot, while touring the United States. Puppeteer Olive Blackham of Roel Puppets made the mannequins for Lima Beans.

Kreymborg played chess at a near-professional level; he was recognized as a National Master standard player in his youth. On two occasions he played and lost to José Capablanca, including a defeat in 1910 due to a mix-up in his endgame He drew one game with the U.S. Champion Frank Marshall in the 1911 Masters Tournament, but shortly afterward left the chess world after a stunning defeat by Oscar Chajes, returning to the sport roughly 23 years later. He wrote the article 'Chess Reclaims a Devotee', which is semi-autobiographical and also based on Charles Jaffe; the story is well known in chess circles.

Kreymborg was very close with sculptor Alexander "Sandy" Calder.

Due to his knack of "discovering" and publishing some of the most important poets during his time, Kreymborg later became president of the Poetry Society of America.

== Critical views ==
Kreymborg later became a relatively conservative poet, but – according to Julian Symons – "never an interesting one."

In Namedropping, Richard Elman writes a short chapter about a meeting with Kreymborg in the early 1960s.

== Works ==
Maxim Lieber was Kreymborg's literary agent in 1947.

- Love and Life and Other Studies (1908)
- Apostrophes: A Book of Tributes to Masters of Music (1910)
- Erna Vitek (1914) novel
- Edna: The Girl of the Street (1915) PDF of 1919 edition with G. B. Shaw contribution
- To My Mother 10 Rhythms (1915)
- Mushrooms: A Book of Free Forms (1916) poems, as 1915 Mushrooms 16 Rhythms in Bruno Chap Books
- Others: An Anthology of the New Verse (1916) editor
- Others: An Anthology of the New Verse (1917) editor
- Six Plays for Poem-Mimes (1918)
- Blood of Things: A Second Book of Free Forms (1920)
- Others for 1919: An Anthology of the New Verse (1920)
- Plays for Merry Andrews (1920)
- Less Lonely (1923)
- Puppet Plays (1923)
- Troubadour (1925) autobiography
- Lima Beans. A Scherzo Play in One Act (1925)
- Rocking Chairs and Other Comedies (1925)
- Manikin and Minikin (1925)
- Scarlet and Mellow (1926)
- There's a Moon Tonight (1926) comedy
- The American Caravan (1927), yearbook, editor with Lewis Mumford, Van Wyck Brooks and Paul Rosenfeld, later years also
- Funnybone Alley (1927)
- The Lost Sail, A Cape Cod Diary (1928)
- Alfred Kreymborg (1928) The Pamphlet Poets
- Manhattan Men: Poems and Epitaphs (1929) poems
- Body and Stone: A Song Cycle (1929)
- Our Singing Strength, An Outline of American Poetry, 1620 - 1930 (1929) also later in 1934
- An Anthology of American Poetry Lyric: America 1630–1930 (1930) anthology, later editions are supplemented
- Prologue in Hell (1930)
- I'm Not Complaining: A Kaffeeklatsch (1932)
- The Little World. 1914 and After (1932)
- I'm No Hero (1933)
- How Do You Do Sir? And Other Short Plays (1934)
- Anthology of One-Act Plays 1937-38 (1938) editor
- The Planets: A Modern Allegory (1938)
- Two New Yorkers (1938) editor Stanley Burnshaw, illustrated by Alexander Kruse
- The Four Apes and Other Fables of Our Day (1939)
- Poetic Drama: An Anthology of Plays in Verse (1941) editor
- Ten American Ballads (1942)
- Selected Poems 1912 to 1944 (1945)
- Man and Shadow: An Allegory (1946) poems
- The Poetry Society of America Anthology (1946) editor with Amy Bonner and others
- No More War: An Ode to Peace (1949)
- No More War and other poems (1950)
