= ABC of Reading =

1934 non-fiction book by Ezra Pound

- Title page for ABC of Reading (1934)
- Author: Ezra Pound
- Publisher: Faber and Faber
- Publication date: 1934

ABC of Reading is a book by the 20th-century Imagist poet Ezra Pound published in 1934. In it, Pound sets out an approach by which one may come to appreciate and understand literature (focusing primarily on poetry). Despite its title the text can be considered as a guide to writing poetry. The work begins with the "Parable of the sunfish", features a collection of English poetry that Pound called Exhibits and several notable quotations.

== Mantras ==
- "Literature is language charged with meaning: Great literature is simply charged with meaning to the utmost degree" - to be achieved by three main ways:
1. phanopoeia – throwing the object (fixed or moving) on to the visual imagination.
2. melopoeia – inducing emotional correlations by sound and rhythm of the speech.
3. logopoeia – inducing 1 & 2 by stimulating associations with other word/word groups.
- "Literature is news that stays news".
- "Music rots when it gets too far from the dance. Poetry atrophies when it gets too far from music."
- "I've never read half a page of Homer without finding melodic invention."
- "Without the foregoing minimum of poetry in other languages you simply will not know where English poetry comes."
- "From Chaucer you can learn whatever came over into the earliest English that one can read without a dictionary."
- "Artists are the antennae of the race."
- "Man can learn more about poetry by really knowing and examining a few of the best poems than by meandering about among a great many."
- "One of the pleasures of middle age is to find out that one was right, and that one was much righter than one knew at say seventeen or twenty-three."
- "The honest critic must be content to find a very little contemporary work worth serious attention; but he must be ready to recognize that little..."
- "There are three types of melopoeia, i.e. verse made to sing; to chant/intone; and to speak. The older one gets the more one believes in the first. One reads prose for the subject matter."

== Treatise on Metre ==
The monograph ends with an essay on creative development and the poet's relationship to music entitled "Treatise on Metre." Featuring three sections, Pound explores the requirements of authentic inspiration and how regulation [including "nomenclature" and rhyming schemes] inhibits the natural process. Using music as a throughline, he argues that rhythm and melody, under the banner of listening, can infuse the process of versification and help instigate more genuine, less didactically-inclined prosody.

== See also ==
- Pound's ideogrammic method
- Google Books version: https://books.google.it/books/about/ABC_of_Reading.html?id=0GazhoHAYQgC&printsec=frontcover
- monoskop version: https://monoskop.org/images/a/a4/Pound_Ezra_ABC_of_Reading.pdf
