= Melopoeia =

Melopoeia, also melopeia and melopœia, may refer to:

- a term in Byzantine music
- one of Ezra Pound's Three Kinds of Poetry
