= Guido Bruno =

American writer and artist (1884–1942)

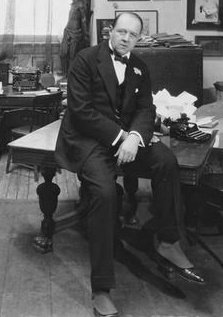
Guido Bruno

Guido Bruno (1884–1942) was a well-known Greenwich Village character, and small press publisher and editor, sometimes called "the Barnum of Bohemia."

He was based at his "Garret on Washington Square" where for an admission fee tourists could observe "genuine Bohemian" artists at work. He produced a series of little magazine publications from there, including Bruno's Weekly, Bruno's Monthly, Bruno's Bohemia, Greenwich Village, and the 15 cent Bruno Chap Books.

From July 1915 to December 1916, Bruno's Weekly published poems, short stories, essays, illustrations and plays, as well as special sections, such as "Children's House," and "In Our Village." The publisher was Charles Edison. Bruno's Weekly published Alfred Kreymborg, Djuna Barnes and Sadakichi Hartmann, Alfred Douglas, articles on Oscar Wilde, and Richard Aldington on the Imagists. Others were Theodore Albert Schroeder, Edna W. Underwood, and Charles Kains-Jackson.

In 1915–16, Bruno briefly partnered with Charles Edison in the operation of the "Little Thimble Theater."

He was a close associate of Frank Harris, allegedly, though, stealing Harris's diary and trying to sell it.

He emigrated to the United States as a second cabin class passenger on the S/S Friedrich der Grosse under his original name Kurt Kisch in December 1906.
