= Edward Storer =

English writer, translator and poet (1880–1944)

Edward Augustine Storer (1880–1944) was an English writer, translator, and poet.

== Life and career ==
Edward A. Storer was born in Alnwick on 25 July 1880 to Frances Anne Egan and James John Robson Storer, he died in Weybridge (London) on 11 February 1944. In 1907 he was on the Roll of the Law Society of England and Wales (London) qualified as a solicitor. However, he practised only for two years because he soon realized that poetry was his main interest.

He was one of the first promoters and theorists of Imagism along with T. E. Hulme and F. S. Flint, but his contrasting relation with Ezra Pound contributed to make him soon forgotten. His poetry was based on the value of the image to which language had to be adapted in conciseness and vividness through the use of simple and universally comprehensible symbols.

Although he was eager to renew English poetry in technique and subjects, he did not deny the value of tradition and classicism: modern and Romantic sensitiveness were both present in his work. His conception of poetry was expressed in a specific Essay published in Mirrors of Illusion: poetry is essentially "a nostalgia for the infinité". Like H.D. and Richard Aldington, he looked at the ancient Greek poetry and mythology with admiration and always maintained a classical character along with modernity in his poetry: epigrammatic poetry was a perfect synthesis of the two features. In this period he translated many Greek poems. When he was in London he collaborated as a reviewer, critic and poet to many reviews and magazines: "The New Age", "The British Review", "Poetry and Drama", "The Egoist", "The English Review", "Broom" and others.

In 1908 Storer published Inclinations:Poems 1909 its content, described by F. S. Flint as in the 'Imagist' manner. Later in the Spring of 1909, Storer was a founder member of a group, (an unnamed Soho dining and talking society) from which the Imagist genre was derived. According to Flint, "Storer leading it chiefly, of what we called the Image. We were very much influenced by modern French symbolist poetry". In that same year, 1909, Storer wrote an essay on Imagism, appended to his book Mirrors of Illusion, in which he said "there is no absolute virtue in iambic pentameter as such...however well they may be done. There is no immediate virtue in rhythm even. These things are merely a means to an end". F. S. Flint, in a review of Mirrors of Illusion in New Age Review IV (A. R. Orage's magazine of that Edwardian era) said "with Storer the soul of poetry is ... verse cut up and phrased according to the flow of the emotion and exercise of the sixth sense ... we have a poet who has fought his way out of convention, and formed for himself a poetique".

Later, from 1914 onward, Storer was one of the principal contributors to The Egoist (An Individualist Review) with short articles on modern poetry, painting, sculpture, translations etc. (which at the time) was considered as propaganda for imagism or at least advertising for the imagists. In 1916 he wrote a noteworthy article on the Free verse form noting "every man's free verse is different". In 1916 Storer moved to Italy and from 1917 to 1941 lived in Rome. Here he founded and edited "Atys" – "Foglio d'Arte e di Letteratura Internazionale/Occasional Broadsheet of Art and Literature" from 1918 to 1921. During this period he was in close contact with Italian painters and poets who belonged to the second Futurism: he created a particular movement not well defined and not officially recognized, but with specific features. It included some Dadaist aspects and its main goal was substantially to enhance the value of spiritualism in a laic way. In particular, Storer was in touch with Francesco Meriano and Enrico Prampolini, who illustrated "Atys". During his staying in Italy he translated Luigi Pirandello's plays (Six Characters in Search of an Author and Henry IV, translations based on the first editions of Pirandello's plays) and also devoted to the Italian dramatist some critical essays. (He personally met him). He translated other Italian writers and poets, thus performing a true role of cultural mediator. In Storer's renewal programme, translation was important and necessary to diffuse new authors as models for English writers. He studied English contemporary theatre: he was very interested and began writing dramas himself.

From 1929 he became primarily a journalist: poetry was only a beautiful and pleasant memory. He tried to publish again in 1938 a modernistic poetry collection, Masquerades: designs for fancy dress, but the project was never realized. He was only successful in having The Young Bride and Rose of Persia included in Fifty years of modern verse. An anthology, edited by John Gawsworth, London, Martin & Secker, 1938. He worked for news agencies (Reuter's, American United Press, British United Press and Exchange Tele. & Co., International News Service) and as an Italian correspondent for "The Observer", "Washington Times" and other newspapers. When he returned to London after the outbreak of the Second World War, he collaborated with the BBC for transmissions in Italian language until his death.

== Poetry ==
- Inclinations. Poems. Sisley, London [1907]
- Mirrors of Illusion. With an essay , Sisley, London [1908]
- The Ballad of the Mad Bird and Other Poems Hampstead Priory Press, London 1909
- Narcissus The Priority Press, Hampstead 1913
- Form in Free Verse New Republic Mar 1916
- Terra Italica. Poems written in Italy, wood-cuts by M. Nutting, "The Egoist" Press, London 1920
- I've quite forgotten Lucy and Other Poems Dan Rider, London [1932]

== Criticism and biography ==
- Leigh Hunt, F. G. Browne & Co. Chicago, Herbert & Daniel, London [1911]
- Peter the Cruel. The life of the notorious Don Pedro of Castile, together with an account of his relations with the famous Maria Padilla, with a frontispiece in photogravure and sixteen other illustrations, John Lane London - The Bodley Head New York, 1911
- William Cowper, F. G. Browne & Co. Chicago - Herbert & Daniel, London [1912]
- Dramatists of to-day. The series includes: I. H. Granville Barker, in "The British Review", vol. IV, no. 2, November 1913, pp. 248–255, II. John Galsworthy, ibidem, pp. 255–262; III. John Masefield, ibidem, vol. IV, no. 3, December 1913, pp. 408–415, IV. Stanley Houghton, ibidem, pp. 415–421; V. John M. Synge, ibidem, vol. V, no. 1, January 1914, pp. 73–80, VI. St. John Hankin, ibidem, pp. 80–87; VII. Bernard Shaw, ibidem, vol. V, no. 2, February 1914, pp. 251–264; VIII. William B. Yeats, ibidem, vol. V, no. 3, March 1914, pp. 415–422, XI. Lady Gregory, ibidem, pp. 422–429

== Translations from Greek ==
- Poems & Fragments of Sappho, in Poets' Translation Series, "The Egoist", no. 10, vol. II, October 1915, pp. 153–155
- Poems & Fragments of Sappho, "The Egoist" Press, London, [first set], no. 2, 1915
- The Poems of Sappho, The Clerk's Private Press, Cleveland 1917
- The Poems of Anyte of Tegea (translated by R. Aldington) and Poems & Fragments of Sappho, "The Egoist" Press, London, [second set], no. 2, 1919
- The Windflowers of Asklepiades and Poems of Poseidippos, "The Egoist" Press, London 1920

== Pirandello's translations ==
- L. PIRANDELLO, Three Plays, E. P. Dutton & Co., New York [1922]
- L. PIRANDELLO, Three Plays - Six characters in search of an author, Henry IV, translated by E. Storer, Right you are (if you think so), translated by A. Livingston, Dent, London 1923

== Critical essays on Pirandello's work ==
- The "Grotesques" of Pirandello, in "Forum", New York, October 1921, pp. 271–281
- Luigi Pirandello: dramatist, in "The Fortnightly Review", August 1924, pp. 227–241
- Pirandello: man and artist, in "Bookman", London, April 1926, pp. 8–11

== Other Italian Translations ==
- N. MOSCARDELLI, Poems («Poem», «Whispered», «Love», «Love», «Spring», «Poem», «Summer», «At Evening», «The poor man»), in "Atys", no. 2, December 1918, p. 3
- N. MOSCARDELLI, Images («Rome», «Interior», «Nocturne», «Dawn»), in "Atys", no. 7, December 1919, p. 3
- C. GOVONI, Jealousy, in "Atys", no. 9, May 1920, p. 2
- C. GOVONI, The Woodpecker, in "Broom", vol. III, no. 1, August 1922, p. 77
- E. PRAMPOLINI, The Aesthetic of the Machine and Mechanical Introspection in Art, in "Broom", vol. III, no. 3, October 1922, pp. 235–237
- G. GIOLITTI, Memoirs of My Life, (with an introduction by O. Malagodi), Chapman and Dodd Ltd., London and Sydney, 1923
- ANONIMOUS, Il Novellino, (translated and introduced by E. Storer), London, G. Routledge & Sons Ltd. - New York, E. P. Dutton & Co., [1925]
- P. BRACCIOLINI, The Facetiae of Poggio and Other Medieval Story-tellers, (translated by E. Storer, with an introduction and notes), G. Routledge & Sons Ltd. London, E. P. Dutton & Co., New York, 1928: online
- P. ZAPPA, Unclean! Unclean!, (with an introduction by Sir L. Rogers K.C.S.I.), Lovat Dickson Ltd., London,[1933]

== Storer's dramas ==
- Danae, Athene Press, Rome, [1917]
- Helen, in "Poetry and Drama", vol. I, no. 6, June 1914, pp. 153–165
