= Others: A Magazine of the New Verse =

American literary magazine

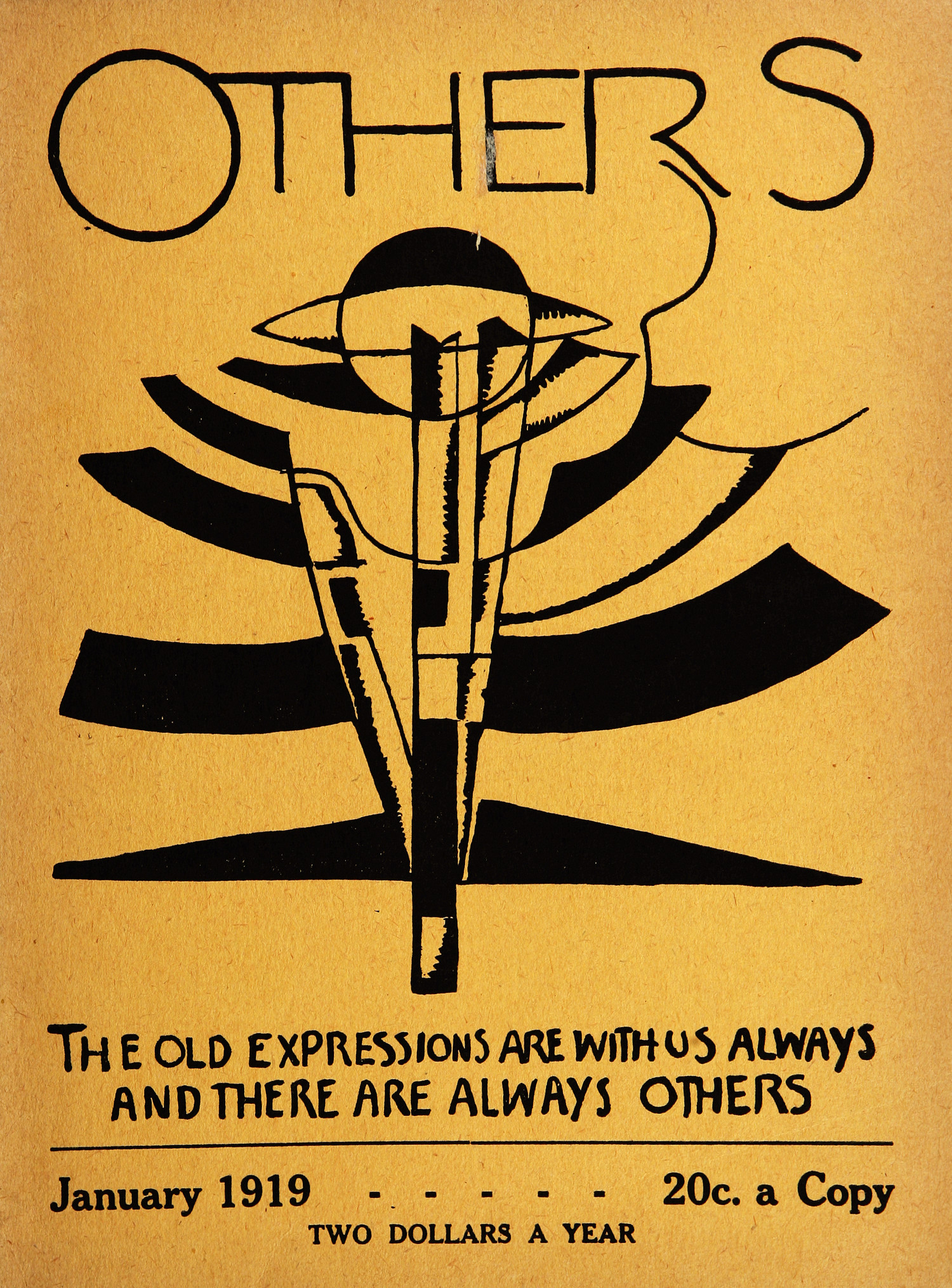
January 1919 issue

Others: A Magazine of the New Verse was an American literary magazine founded by Alfred Kreymborg in July 1915 with financing from Walter Conrad Arensberg. The magazine ran until July, 1919. It was based in New York City and published poetry and other writing, as well as visual art. While the magazine never had more than 300 subscribers, it helped launch the careers of several important American modernist poets. Contributors included: William Carlos Williams, Orrick Johns, Wallace Stevens, Marianne Moore, Mina Loy, Ezra Pound, Conrad Aiken, Carl Sandburg, T. S. Eliot, Amy Lowell, H.D., Djuna Barnes, Man Ray, Skipwith Cannell, Lola Ridge, Marcel Duchamp, and Fenton Johnson (poet) (the only African American published in the magazine).

Each copy of the magazine was sold for 20 cents. The purpose of Others was to create a space for unity among individuals who otherwise differ from the norms of society. Its motto proclaimed, "The old expressions are with us always, and there are always others". Others was a site of free thinking, or “otherness.” It was also a space to proclaim a strong affiliation with the local community of the Lower East Side in New York that was identified with the mixed population of an excluded group of immigrants, such as Jews. Others' poets wanted to show a positive image of Jewish immigration. This population can be seen as a representation of social and intellectual progressivism, and the experimentation of the "new", instead of the stereotyped figure of the self-deprecating Jew; that was profoundly perpetuated by Euromodernism or poets from Little Review. Suzanne Churchill describes it as "a house for the most innovative free verse, and representative of new literature found dangerous and offensive". It was considered 'dangerous' because critics of modernism viewed the intrusion of foreignness as a contamination to the traditional style of literature, while Others' poets saw it as an innovation. Subsequently, the transformation of the American demographics simultaneously created a change in modern literature, which celebrated the merge with other cultures, or in other words the melting pot.

== Before Others ==
Alfred Stieglitz was a photographer known for his internationally renowned art gallery known as "291". He later produced a magazine with the same name along with several other poets and photographers who shared an objective to publish and share original artwork by new artists. Alfred Kreymborg was astonished by Stieglitz's creations and was enthralled by the idea that experimental artists and photographers could gather together to exchange ideas and earn praise for art that might have been ridiculed elsewhere. Under the influence of Stieglitz, Kreymborg decided to create a space exclusively for literary artists, "a space that defines the identities of its inhabitants, enabling artistic men to 'find themselves' and to find others like them". For that reason, Kreymborg found his first experimental magazine called The Glebe which means "a field or a piece of cultivated land." He hoped for it to be an open field for new artists who did not have the opportunity, or confidence to share their respectable work. The Glebe was financially supported by Albert and Charles Boni but eventually Kreymborg and the Bonis had differing opinions on the type of work that should be displayed in the magazine. Kreymborg remained loyal to his desires for experimenting. He favoured works by Americans, where as the Bonis preferred European art. In the end, Kreymborg resigned as editor from The Glebe and slowly the magazine collapsed.

== Others: A New Magazine ==
Others was a space and magazine which was resisted by many other poetry magazines produced in the same period. Poetry and The Little Magazine would criticize the new verse style of writing. They referred to the accomplishments produced by Others as fluke but Others never retaliated against the magazines that criticized itself. Many of Others's verses explored the themes of American life in 1910s such as the industrial metropolis, or the explosive dynamics of Machine Age Labor, and catastrophe of global warfare. The magazine gradually acquired a reputation for individualism but it also acquired an image of "queerness" after the addition of other contributors such as Mary Carolyn Davies, Mina Loy, and Marianne Moore. Davies' "Songs of a Girl" and Mina Loy's "Love Songs" boldly publicize private feminine spaces. Queerness was not entirely associated with homosexuality, but in a sense of innovation and breaking free of norms. The introduction of New Verse also served as a tool and style of writing that assisted the emancipation for women. Others became a magazine that rejected the conventional styles of poetry in addition to the resistance to sexual modesty. Male poet contributors of Others were criticized for being weak and effeminate while on the contrary women writer or poets were portrayed as "super-modern Sappho", in other words female homosexuals. Despite criticisms from many readers toward works that were produced by Others, some reviewers such as H. L. Hemcken and J.B Kerfoot acknowledged free verse as a movement that reawakened American individualism.

== Contributors ==
There were many outstanding contributors to Others including Ezra Pound and T.S. Eliot. While some of them are not considered frequent contributors, a few of the authors who made significant contributions to Others's image as an unconventional modern magazine are Mina Loy, Marianne Moore, Wallace Stevens, and William Carlos Williams.

=== Mina Loy ===
Mina Loy's work explores the female consciousness in an aggressive way, particularly considering it was written in 1915. Her bold articulation of female fantasies and female performance of sexuality completely reject the Victorian denial of female sexuality. Loy's style of work emphasizes the rebellious state of authors similar to herself and attest to their identities of "otherness". Loy needed Others as a free space to perpetuate her unorthodox values, while the magazine depended on Loy for creating an image of boldness. In contrast to other magazines, Others was willing to publish longer works without imposing format standards or censoring poets' content. Therefore, Loy's "Love Songs" made an explicit entrance to Others with graphic writing that depicts scenes of explicit sex or grotesque sexuality. Loy mocks the romantic conventions of Victorian writing with her candid verse that depicts sexuality as a complex topic. By representing herself as a sexual woman skeptical to the conventions of romance, she inverts the gender norms of women confined to the private sphere and men confined to the public sphere.

=== Marianne Moore ===
Marianne Moore, in contrast to some of extreme revolutionary female writers like Mina Loy or Helen Hoyt, departs from modern sexual conventions. Moore inclined to manipulate the use of grammar to equalize the positions of male and female subject and objects. She transforms language to free herself from the constraints of sexual difference. Both Moore and Loy's names are frequently coupled together in that they are associated in very different ways, but their shared social-political principles suggest their common tie to Others. Moore found it necessary in her writing to judge people on the basis of abilities as well as the importance of cultural superiority. Several of her poems indicated her acknowledgement of feeling out of place through thinking and living. She recurrently used animals to reflect her concern for literature and nature, and to express the theme of independence such as the black swan she writes in her poem "Critics and Connoisseurs." Her style is unlike Loy's, which is dangerous and provocative, but both names are linked together in Others for their freshness of presentation, novelty, freedom and break from traditional literature.

=== William Carlos Williams ===
William Carlos Williams is one of the primary contributors to Others and a novelty enthusiast. He introduced the elimination of capital letters at the beginning of lines as a poetic innovation. This was a suggestion to further modernize the magazine with new innovations. William's mixed ancestry of Puerto Rican and English furthers his affiliation with "otherness." He also claimed that America was his only possible home as he witnessed the openness to the immigrant population that was changing America. Williams saw potential toward Jewish immigration and the increase of racial blending as directly affecting American poetry. When Others was on the verge of collapse in 1916, Williams took the opportunity to restart the magazine. Subsequently, in 1919 he was also the one to seize the opportunity to pronounce the official end to the magazine. Despite putting an end to the production of Others he included in the last issue an eight-page section entitled "Belly Music," a rant about American poetry criticism being "sophomoric, puling, and nonsensical", but also ensured the public that the end of Others was only a pretext for another new beginning.

== A Woman's Number ==
One of the much later issues of Others was "A Woman's Number" edited by Helen Hoyt in 1916. The purpose of the issue was to establish a new relationship between the inner woman and the outside world. Hoyt wanted to portray a hidden femininity that could be translated through the expression of poetry. The issue was condemned by critics for its controversial theme. However Hoyt continued to want to establish a space where "Art is surely sexless". Similar to contemporary women's magazines, the woman's number provided a space for self-expression in terms exploring the private prospect into female experiences and attitudes. Most contributions were written in free verse as an act of emancipation to break from the conventional norms of repressive sexuality. In Hoyt's poem called "To a Pregnant Woman" she writes "So absolutely to command, / To serve, to keep. /Knowing you hold the beating life of the beloved / In the depths of your life;" this reveal the intimate relationship mothers have with their child and the control of a woman's own body. Poets like H.D. write boldly about female sexuality through the use of metaphors to convey the meanings of bodily desires or the use of "Evening" as a symbol of sensualism without being sexually explicit.

== The Gift of Others ==
Kreymborg was indeed an enthusiast in terms of finding new art for Others, and so to continue his work, he needed new partnership and financial support. Unfortunately his new partnership with William Carlos Williams, F.S. Flint and Maxwell Bodenheim, who were some of the first few who participated in producing Others, went downhill. Williams rejected Kreymborg's idea of further expanding Others and took over the last issue, putting a stop to the production of the magazine. However Others did not simply disappear without a trace. Those who once contributed to Others often worked together to review each other's new work. Scofield Thayer, co-publisher and co-editor of The Dial also asked many of Others' writers to continue producing their work in his magazine. In the end The Dial continued Others' poetic tone.

== See also ==
- List of literary magazines
- Modernist poetry in English
- Others group of artists
