= Allen Upward =

British poet, lawyer, politician, and teacher

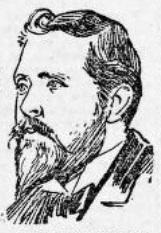
Upward in 1895

George Allen Upward (Worcester 20 September 1863 – Wimborne 17 November 1926) was a British poet, lawyer, politician and teacher. His work was included in the first anthology of Imagist poetry, Des Imagistes, which was edited by Ezra Pound and published in 1914. He was a first cousin once removed of Edward Upward. His parents were George and Mary Upward, and he was survived by an elder sister (Mary) Edith Upward.

== Early life ==
Upward was brought up as a member of the Plymouth Brethren and trained as a lawyer at the Royal University of Dublin (now University College Dublin). While living in Dublin, he wrote a pamphlet in favour of Irish Home Rule.

In the 1890s he lived in Cardiff where he worked as a lawyer, journalist and novelist. He also stood several times unsuccessfully as a candidate for both the Liberal and Labour party. He defended Havelock Wilson and other Labour leaders and ran for election as a Lib-Lab candidate, taking 659 votes in Merthyr at the 1895 general election.

Upward later worked for the British Foreign Office in Nigeria as an officer for the British Government.

== Literary career ==
He wrote two books of poetry, Songs in Ziklag (1888) and Scented Leaves from a Chinese Jar. He also published a translation of the Sayings of Confucius (1904) and a volume of autobiography, Some Personalities (1921).

Upward wrote a number of novels: The Prince of Balkistan (1895), A Crown of Straw (1896), A Bride's Madness (1897), The Accused Princess (1900), The International Spy: Being a Secret History of the Russo-Japanese War (1905), and Athelstane Ford. His 1910 novel The Discovery of the Dead is a collected fantasy (listed in Bleiler) dealing with the emerging science of Necrology.

In 1907, Upward self-published a book (originally written in 1901) that he apparently thought would be Nobel Prize material: The New Word. This book is today known as the first citation of the word "Scientology", however there was no delineation in this book of its definition by Upward. It is unknown whether L. Ron Hubbard, the founder of the Scientology-organization, knew of this book. His 1913 book The Divine Mystery is an anthropological study of Christian mythology.

In 1917 the British Museum refused to take Upward's manuscripts, "on the grounds that the writer was still alive," and Upward burned them.

== Death ==
Upward shot himself in the heart in Wimborne Minster, Dorset, and was found dead on 17 November 1926.

Ezra Pound would a decade later satirically remark that this was due to his disappointment after hearing of George Bernard Shaw's Nobel Prize award which Shaw won in 1925.

== Reputation ==
Upward's reputation as an obscure genius, the hidden mastermind behind some of the most obscure thoughts of Ezra Pound and his fellow Imagists was made by two essays Pound wrote in 1913–1914 and various mentions of Upward in his Cantos. In 1975 there was a brief flurry of interest in this view of Upward typified by Donald Davie's piece on Upward in his attempt to revive sympathetic interest in Pound. In 1978 Mick Sheldon published an essay which demonstrated that alongside his relationship with Pound Upward had a reputation as a popular novelist, lawyer, politician and local celebrity. Even more interesting were the discoveries that Upward had influenced Edward Upward, to whom he was related, W. H. Auden whose poem The Orators refers to Allen's suicide, and Robert Duncan who wrote a lengthy introduction to The Divine Mystery. Sheldon also revealed that before Pound had begun championing the cause of Allen Upward's genius, a female philosopher called Victoria Welby had expressed the view that Upward's The New Word was a significant contribution to modernist philosophy.

== Books ==
- Songs in Ziklag (poems), 1888
- The Prince of Balkistan, 1895
- Secrets of the Courts of Europe, Serialised: Pearson's Magazine, 1896
- A Crown of Straw, 1896
- A Bride’s Madness, 1897
- The Accused Princess, 1900
- Secret History of To-Day, Being Revelations of a Diplomatic Spy, 1904
- The New Word, Anon. [Allen Upward], first edition, London, A. Owen and Co., 1907
- The Discovery of the Dead, 1910
- The Divine Mystery, Letchworth Garden City Press, 1913
- The Yellow Hand, Serialised: Dublin Evening Telegraph, 1921
- The Queen against Owen, date of first publication unknown, but before 1923
- Athelstane Ford, date of first publication unknown, but before 1923
- The Ordeal of Fire, date of first publication unknown, but before 1923
- The House of Sin, Serialised: Dublin Evening Telegraph, 1923
- The Club of Mask, 1926
- The Venetian Key, 1927

== Stage Plays ==
- A Flan in the Pan, 1896
