= Skipwith Cannell =

American poet

Skipwith Cannell (1887–1957) was an American poet associated with the Imagist group. His surname is pronounced with the accent on the second syllable. He was a friend of William Carlos Williams, and like Ezra Pound he came from Philadelphia. Cannell studied at the University of Virginia and was enthusiastic about the work of Edgar Allan Poe and the free verse of The King James Version of The Bible. He was briefly married to Kathleen Eaton Cannell, who was generally known as 'Kitty'.

Cannell met Pound in Paris in 1913. Pound sent some of Cannell's poems to Harriet Monroe. Back in London, Pound took Cannell and Kitty to visit Yeats and found a room for the couple below his own in Church Walk, Kensington.

Cannell's work appeared in the first Imagist anthology, edited by Pound and published by Poetry Bookshop in 1914 Des Imagistes and The New Poetry: An Anthology, edited by Harriet Monroe and Alice Corbin Henderson in 1917.

Cannell and Kitty divorced in 1921. There were no children from this first marriage. Cannell married secondly Juliette Del Grange, a French national with whom he had two daughters, May and Sarah. His second marriage also ended in divorce. He married a third time to Catherine Pettigrew, with whom he had five additional children, David, Mary, Michael, John and Susan.

He was closely involved with Alfred Kreymborg's magazine Others: A Magazine of the New Verse.

== Sources ==
- Robert Karoly Sarlos, Jig Cook and the Provincetown Players: Theatre in Ferment University of Massachusetts Press, 1982. ISBN 0-87023-349-1
- James J Wilhelm, Ezra Pound in London and Paris 1908-1925 Penn State Press, 1990. ISBN 0-271-00682-X
- Noel Stock, The Life of Ezra Pound, Routledge and Kegan Paul, 1970. ISBN 0-14-021795-9 (p. 174 of the Penguin edition)
- James J Wilhelm, Ezra Pound in London and Paris 1908-1925 Penn State Press, 1990. ISBN 0-271-00682-X (see p. 301)
