= Parable of the Sunfish =

Anecdote by Ezra Pound about empirical learning

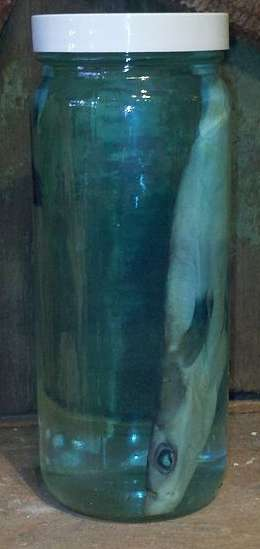
Preserved dogfish specimen similar to that which would have been used by Agassiz and his students

"The Parable of the Sunfish" is an anecdote with which Ezra Pound opens ABC of Reading, a 1934 work of literary criticism. Pound uses this anecdote to emphasize an empirical approach for learning about art, in contrast to relying on commentary rooted in abstraction. While the parable is based on students' recollections of Louis Agassiz's teaching style, Pound's retelling diverges from these sources in several respects. The parable has been used to illustrate the benefits of scientific thinking, but more recent literary criticism has split on whether the parable accurately reflects the scientific process and calls into question Pound's empirical approach to literature.

== The Parable ==
Ezra Pound in 1920

The text of the parable below is excerpted from Pound's ABC of Reading.

A post-graduate student equipped with honors and diplomas went to Agassiz to receive the final and finishing touches. The great man offered him a small fish and told him to describe it.

Post-Graduate Student: "That's only a sunfish."

Agassiz: "I know that. Write a description of it."

After a few minutes the student returned with the description of the Ichthus Heliodiplodokus, or whatever term is used to conceal the common sunfish from vulgar knowledge, family of Heliichtherinkus, etc., as found in textbooks of the subject.

Agassiz again told the student to describe the fish.

The student produced a four-page essay. Agassiz then told him to look at the fish. At the end of three weeks the fish was in an advanced state of decomposition, but the student knew something about it.

== Context ==
=== ABC of Reading ===
Pound opens ABC of Reading with the following pronouncement:

The proper METHOD for studying poetry and good letters is the method of contemporary biologists, that is careful first-hand examination of the matter, and continual COMPARISON of one 'slide' or specimen with another. No man is equipped for modern thinking until he has understood the anecdote of Agassiz and the sunfish.

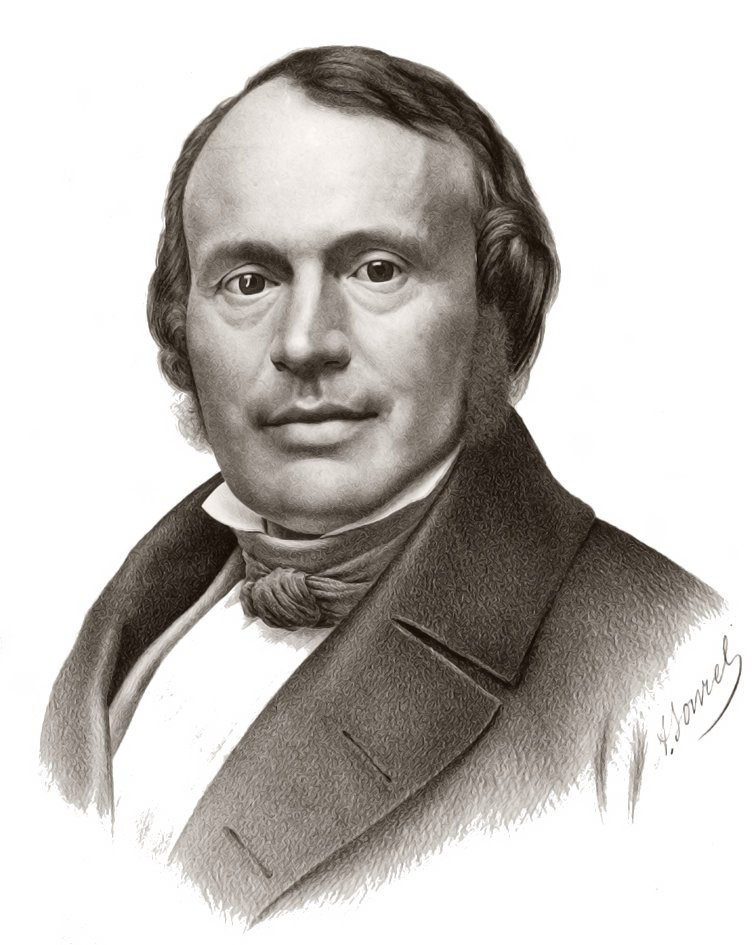
Louis Agassiz

In the parable, a graduate student is sent to noted biologist Louis Agassiz to complete his education, and Agassiz asks the student three times to describe a sunfish specimen. The student replies with, in turn, the common name of the fish, a brief summary of the species, and a four-page essay on the species. Agassiz finally tells the student to "look at the fish" and "[a]t the end of three weeks the fish was in an advanced state of decomposition, but the student knew something about it." The text of the parable itself spans 131 words over sixteen lines and is often reproduced in full when cited.

Pound contrasts this empiricism against knowledge gained through increasingly abstract definitions. As an example, Pound relates what might happen if a European is asked to define "red". After the initial response that red is a color, Pound imagines asking for a definition of color and having it described in terms of vibration, with vibration then defined in terms of energy, and that successive abstractions eventually reach a level where language has lost its power. Returning to empiricism, Pound reminds the reader that the progress of science increased rapidly once "Bacon had suggested the direct examination of phenomena, and after Galileo and others had stopped discussing things so much, and had begun really to look at them". Pound provides several other examples of the same contrasting ideas throughout the first chapter, ranging over topics as diverse as chemistry, Chinese writing, and Stravinsky. At the end of the chapter he summarizes his argument by claiming abstraction does not expand knowledge.

=== Literary essays ===
Pound subsequently refers to the parable in two essays: "The Teacher's Mission" and "Mr Housman at Little Bethel". Both were republished in The Literary Essays of Ezra Pound and reference Agassiz without including details of the parable. "The Teacher's Mission" in particular provides a straightforward explanation of how Pound wished the parable to be interpreted.

==== "Mr Housman at Little Bethel" ====
In January 1934, Pound published a critique of A. E. Housman's The Name and Nature of Poetry in the Criterion. As part of the critique, Pound offers an emendation to Housman's claim that "the intelligence" of the eighteenth century involved "some repressing and silencing of poetry". Pound replies that the root cause was the tendency towards abstract statements, which came about in part because eighteenth century authors "hadn't heard about Professor Agassiz's fish."

==== "The Teacher's Mission" ====
Also in 1934, Pound published an essay critiquing existing methods for teaching literature in general and university-level instruction methods in particular. He identifies the root of the problem as abstraction and uses the word "liberty" as an example of a term where a specific, concrete meaning has been lost. Pound finds this situation "inexcusable AFTER the era of 'Agassiz and the fish'" and demands an approach to general education that "parallels ... biological study based on EXAMINATION and COMPARISON of particular specimens."

== Sources ==
Louis Agassiz was a Swiss-born scientist at Harvard University who, by 1896, had established a reputation for "lock[ing] a student up in a room full of turtle-shells, or lobster-shells, or oyster-shells, without a book or a word to help him, and not let[ting] him out till he had discovered all the truths which the objects contained." Several students of Agassiz who went on to prominence recorded this rite of passage, including Henry Blake, David Starr Jordan, Addison Emery Verrill, and Burt Green Wilder. American literary critic Robert Scholes traces the parable's source to two narratives in particular: those of former students Nathaniel Southgate Shaler and Samuel Hubbard Scudder. Their anecdotes were reprinted in Lane Cooper's Louis Agassiz as a Teacher: Illustrative Extracts on his Method of Instruction. Their separate accounts differ markedly from Pound's: both students provide oral reports with a wealth of detail after being initially forbidden from consulting outside sources.

=== Shaler's Autobiography ===
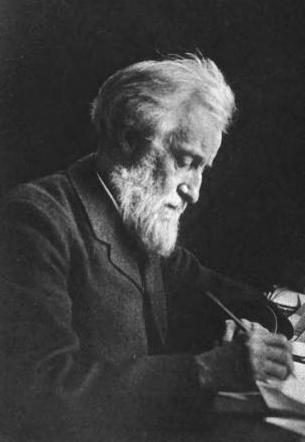
Nathaniel Southgate Shaler

Nathaniel Shaler left his humanist studies and joined Agassiz's lab at Harvard University, having already read Agassiz's introductory essay on classification. His autobiography details his initial interactions with Agassiz. With regard to his first assignment, Shaler recorded that Agassiz brought him a small fish to study with the stipulation that Shaler not discuss it with anyone or read anything on the topic until Agassiz had given him permission. When Shaler asked Agassiz for more explicit instructions, Agassiz replied that he could not be more explicit than saying "[f]ind out what you can without damaging the specimen". After the first hours, Shaler thought he had "compassed that fish," but despite Agassiz always being "within call" he was not asked to present his conclusions. During the course of the following week, Shaler recorded the details of "how the scales went in series, their shape, the form and placement of the teeth, etc."

At length on the seventh day, came the question "Well?" and my disgorge of learning to him as he sat on the edge of my table puffing his cigar. At the end of the hour's telling, he swung off and away, saying "That is not right."

Shaler concluded Agassiz was testing him to see if he was capable of "doing hard, continuous work without the support of a teacher" and redoubled his efforts, starting from scratch and, over the course of seven ten-hour days, managed to describe the specimen to Agassiz's satisfaction.

=== Scudder's "Look at your fish!" ===
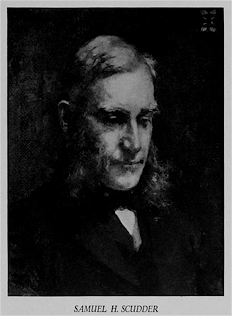
Samuel Hubbard Scudder

Samuel Hubbard Scudder recorded a similar experience, first published in 1874 as "Look at Your Fish" in Every Saturday magazine. Agassiz again starts his new student off with a fish preserved in alcohol and instructs the student to "look at it", and promises "by and by I will ask what you have seen". (Note: Contrast Scudder's specific identification of the specimen with Pound's "Ichthus Heliodiplodokus". A sunfish might be either a Lampridae or a Molidae, but a diplodokus is something altogether different. Pound's name, which includes the Greek words for "fish" and "sun," when taxonomical names are typically Latinate, is very likely meant as a joke.) As opposed to Pound's decomposing sunfish, Scudder's account emphasizes the care taken to keep the specimen in good condition:

I was to keep the fish before me in a tin tray, and occasionally moisten the surface with alcohol from the jar ... In ten minutes I had seen all that could be seen in that fish, and started in search of the Professor – who had, however, left the Museum; and when I returned, after lingering over some of the odd animals stored in the upper apartment, my specimen was dry all over. I dashed the fluid over the fish as if to resuscitate the beast from a fainting fit, and looked with anxiety for a return of the normal sloppy appearance. This little excitement over, nothing was done but to return to a steadfast gaze at my mute companion.

Scudder provides the additional detail that "instruments of all kinds were interdicted", including any magnifying glass. After several hours Agassiz asks for a report and Scudder describes "the fringed gill-arches and moveable operculum; the pores of the head, fleshy lips and lidless eyes; the lateral line, the spinous fins and forked tail; the compressed and arched body". Disappointed, Agassiz informs his student that he has failed to observe "the most conspicuous features of the animal" and commands him to "look again, look again!" The mortified Scudder is eventually asked to consider overnight what he has seen, and is able to report to Agassiz the following morning that "the fish has symmetrical sides with paired organs", which was the observation Agassiz was looking for. However, when Scudder then asked what he should do next, Agassiz replied, "Oh, look at your fish!" which Scudder did for another two full days.

=== Cooper's Louis Agassiz as a Teacher ===
In 1917, English professor Lane Cooper from Cornell University published a collection of reminiscences of Agassiz. The book included notes from several notable contributors, including Scudder and Cooper, William James, Professor Addison Emery Verrill ("[Agassiz's] plan was to make young students depend on natural objects rather than on statements in books"), and Professor Edward S. Morse, who wrote that Agassiz's method was "simply to let the student study intimately one object at a time." Cooper prefigures Pound's interest by remarking on the "close, though not obvious, relation between investigation in biology or zoology and the observation and comparison of these organic forms which we call form of literature and works of art", concluding that "We study a poem, the work of man's art, in the same way that Agassiz made Shaler study a fish." Critic Robert Scholes concludes that Pound had access to this book and used the material within it as the source for the parable that opens ABC of Reading.

== Interpretation and criticism ==
=== Agassiz ===
Science historian Mary P. Winsor provides extensive commentary on Agassiz's initial assignments for his students. The solution to the "riddle", as she calls it, lies in a similar anecdote given by Agassiz in his Essay on Classification:

Suppose that the innumerable articulated animals, which are counted by tens of thousands, nay, perhaps by hundreds of thousands, had never made their appearance upon the surface of the globe, with one single exception: that, for instance, our Lobster (Homarus americanus) were the only representative of that extraordinarily diversified type,—how should we introduce that species of animals in our systems?

Agassiz provides several potential solutions: the species of lobster could have a single genus "by the side of all the other classes with their orders, families, etc.", or a family with one genus and one species, or a class with one order and one genus, etc. Agassiz concludes a single species is sufficient to derive the entirety of the hierarchy: at the time, this would have been "a distinct genus, a distinct family, a distinct class, a distinct branch." The point of the sunfish is not observing characteristics that distinguish individuals, species and genus, but rather characteristics that are held in common higher up the taxonomic hierarchy. Scudder's observation that finally satisfies Agassiz is that the sunfish has bilateral, paired organs; a characteristic that Winsor notes is common to all vertebrates.

=== Pound ===
Pound, echoing Cooper, opens ABC of Reading by stating that the correct method for the study of poetry is "the method of contemporary biologists" and that "No man is equipped for modern thinking until he has understood the anecdote of Agassiz and the fish." Commentators have summarized Pound's position with the term empiricism, but have divided over whether the parable endorses or indicts the idea.

The simplest interpretations in scientific writing, history of science, and literary criticism take the parable at face value, accepting empiricism and observation as legitimate techniques. For example, when writing about stellar atmospheres, Dimitri Mihalas states that "it is specimens, not facts, that are the ultimate empirical currency that we must use if we wish to purchase a valid theory" before beginning a discussion of Pound's sunfish.

Moving from acceptance of empiricism to an understanding of its limitations, Christopher Tilley emphasizes in his comments on "scientific archeology" that Pound's student "was not simply learning about 'reality', the sunfish, but a way of approaching that reality – a discourse bound up in a particular thought tradition (empiricism)". Robert Scholes reaches a similar conclusion, noting that the student "seems to be reporting about a real and solid world in a perfectly transparent language, but actually he is learning how to produce a specific kind of discourse, controlled by a particular scientific paradigm".

Author Bob Perelman takes the suspicion of empiricism one step further in his 1994 The Trouble With Genius: Reading Pound, Joyce, Stein, and Zukofsky. Perelman discusses the parable as one of two anecdotes in ABC of Reading that frame Pound's discussion of Chinese ideograms. The former describes attendance at two hypothetical concerts: one of Debussy and another of Ravel. Pound states that a person who attended both concerts knows more about the composers than someone who has only read "ALL of the criticisms that have ever been written of both". Perelman considers the contradiction between "everyone" and "knowledge" to be the key to Pound's thinking: only a gifted or lucky few are able to apprehend the truth (whether by attending the concert or observing the specimen); the rest can only make do with "a fog of clichés, received ideas, second-hand and second-rate opinions, written darkness." With regard to the parable, Perelman observes the lack of "scientific institutions, pedagogic procedures, or communicable terminologies" where any mediating written descriptions ("sunfish", "diplodokus") only serve to obscure knowledge. Knowledge ultimately resides within Agassiz rather than the world, and "[w]hat looks initially like a commitment to empiricism has led instead to an authoritarian idealism."

Two critics have also commented on the parable's implications in describing the nature of knowledge in terms of the decay of Pound's fish. Celeste Goodridge notes that Marianne Moore's 1934 review of Pound's Cantos uses a detailed metaphor of a grasshopper wing to describe the conversations therein. In Goodridge's opinion, Moore's "microscopic examination" both undercuts the work as well as "pays homage, in its precision, to Pound's reverence for 'the applicability of scientific method to literary criticism.'" Goodridge then reproduces the parable in full and comments, "Agassiz teaches Pound that all knowledge is necessarily fragmented and does not constitute a whole." Knowledge of the fish cannot begin until decay has commenced, reducing the specimen to its constituent parts.

Peter Nicholas Baker reaches a fundamentally different conclusion. He begins the discussion of the parable by first quoting Pound on the topic of genius:

The genius can pay in nugget and in lump gold; it is not necessary that he bring up his knowledge into the mint of consciousness, stamp it either into the coin of conscientiously analyzed form-detail knowledge or into the paper money of words before he transmit it.

Baker finds the most striking feature of the parable to be the absence of description of the fish. Baker asks: "Do readers of this anecdote learn about the fish, or rather about a certain kind of authoritarian teaching practice?" Baker claims that Pound's images of coining metal are just as unrealistic as his ideas regarding science and the scientific method. The reader, following Pound's student, reaches knowledge through intuition alone; the decomposing fish, so far as epistemology is concerned, has become "transparent".
