= Hugo Knudsen =

Hugo Knudsen was a Danish printer, born in 1876 and died in 1955, eponym of the Knudsen process for fine lithography, patented in 1915. He owned the Offset Printing Plate Company of New York, United States.

Knudsen invented and developed the lithographic halftone printing process which is still in use today, and at the time it was superior to any other known method of photo and picture reproduction. This process was used by Edward Steichen.

Knudsen was close friend (and brother-in-law) of Alfred Kreymborg. He was married to Beatrice (Bea) Bloom.
