= Apostrophes: A Book of Tributes to Masters of Music =

1910 music book by Alfred Kreymborg

- Author: Alfred Kreymborg
- Language: English
- Genre: Music
- Publisher: Grafton Press
- Publication date: 1910
- Publication place: United States

Apostrophes: A Book of Tributes to Masters of Music is a book written by Alfred Kreymborg and published by The Grafton Press, New York, in 1910. It is a slim volume (with no page numbers), and comprises a series of short somewhat 'poetic' paragraphs addressed to various great composers. There is an introductory apostrophe To Music, and then sections on the following composers: Giovanni Pierluigi da Palestrina, Henry Purcell, Christoph Willibald Gluck, Wolfgang Amadeus Mozart, Johann Sebastian Bach, Joseph Haydn, Ludwig van Beethoven, Franz Schubert, Hector Berlioz, Felix Mendelssohn, Frédéric Chopin, Robert Schumann, Franz Liszt, Richard Wagner, Giuseppe Verdi, Robert Franz, Johannes Brahms, Georges Bizet, Pyotr Ilyich Tchaikovsky, Antonín Dvořák, Edvard Grieg, Vincent d'Indy, Edward MacDowell, Claude Debussy, and Richard Strauss.

Kreymborg wrote the book while he worked at Aeolian Hall on Fifth Avenue. In his autobiography, Troubador, he describes how he came to write the book; he refers to himself in the third person: "He actually dreamed of writing books of his own and carried the desire to the point of struggling, almost at the outset, with a humble work on the four huge symphonies of Brahms. In retrospect, it looked like a few drops of ink in the sea and he destroyed it. Then he tried the other extreme and evolved a series of paragraphs, concise, restrained and reverent. These prose poems to composers, moving from Palestrina to Debussy, he entitled Apostrophes."

== Reception ==
The Musical Courier called the book "a well-made and feeling little volume, containing many truths framed in beautiful and enthusiastic rhetorical imagery". The Etude said it would be "a nice little gift book to give to any musical person who is not above being sentimental in his appreciation of musicians". In a positive review, The Boston Globe said the book "will appeal to the affectionate interest of music-lovers" and has "25 brief and charmingly graceful tributes to masters of music".
