= Ideogrammic method =

Poetry technique

The ideogrammic method was a technique expounded by Ezra Pound which allowed poetry to deal with abstract content through concrete images. The idea was based on Pound's reading of the work of Ernest Fenollosa, especially The Chinese Written Character as a Medium for Poetry, composed by Fenollosa but edited by Pound after the author's death, 1908.

Pound gives a brief account of it in his book The ABC of Reading (1934). He explains his understanding of the way Chinese characters were formed, with the example of the character 'East' (東) being essentially a superposition of the characters for 'tree' (木) and 'sun' (日); that is, a picture of the sun tangled in a tree's branches, suggesting a sunrise (which occurs in the East). He then suggests how, with such a system where concepts are built up from concrete instances, the (abstract) concept of 'red' might be presented by putting together the (concrete) pictures of:

| ROSE | CHERRY |
| IRON RUST | FLAMINGO |

This was a key idea in the development of Imagism.

== References and further reading ==
- Géfin, Laszlo K. (1982), Ideogram: History of a Poetic Method, University of Texas Press, ISBN 9780292740976
- Xu, Ping (1998), "Rose-Cherry-Sunset-Iron Rust-Flamingo' Diagram And The Genesis Of Ezra Pound'S Ideogrammic Method", Paideuma, 27 (2/3): 53–68, JSTOR 24726187
- Yee, Cordell D. K. (1987), "Discourse on Ideogrammic Method: Epistemology and Pound's Poetics", American Literature, 59 (2): 242–56, doi:10.2307/2927043, JSTOR 2927043

== See also ==
- Ideogram
- Imagism
