= Helen Hoyt =

American poet

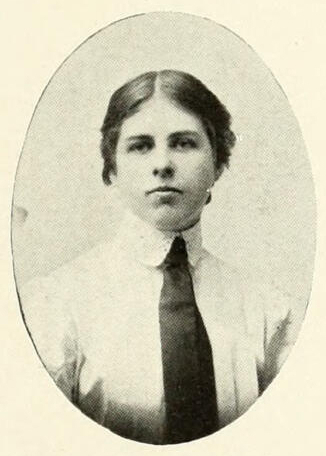
Hoyt in the Barnard College yearbook, 1909

Helen Lyman (January 22, 1887 – August 2, 1972), commonly known as Helen Hoyt or Helen Hoyt Lyman, was an American poet.

== Biography ==
She was born as Helen Hoyt in Norwalk, Connecticut on January 22, 1887, to Gould and Georgiana (Baird) Hoyt.

Helen Hoyt attended Miss Baird's School for Girls in Norwalk, Connecticut, which was owned by her aunt, Cornelia F. Baird. She later was educated at Barnard College, where she received an A. B. in 1909.

In 1921, she married fellow poet William Whittingham Lyman Jr., and so also became known either as Mrs. W.W. Lyman or Helen Hoyt Lyman.

Early in her career, Hoyt was an Associate Editor of the journal Poetry, and also had numerous articles and poems published within the magazine from 1913 to 1936. She also edited the September 1916 edition of Others: A Magazine of the New Verse, the woman's number. Other magazines to publish her work include The Egoist and The Masses.

Aside from her own collections, her work was also published in notable anthologies of her times, including The New Poetry: An Anthology (1917), The Second Book of Modern Verse (1920), Silver Pennies: Modern Poems for Boys and Girls (1925), May Days (1926), and The Best Poems of 1931.

Her poems include Ellis Park, Memory, Lamp Posts and Rain At Night.

In 1932, she wrote the foreword to California Poets: An Anthology of 244 Contemporaries, [House of Henry Harrison, editors].

As of 1943, she was a Socialist.

She was a contemporary of Marianne Moore and Mina Loy, among others.

She was known to entertain correspondence with Idella Purnell Stone and Clark Ashton Smith.

== Publications ==
- Hoyt, Helen (1924). Apples Here in My Basket. New York: Harcourt, Brace and Company.
- Hoyt, Helen (1929). Leaves Of Wild Grape. New York: Harcourt, Brace and Company.
- Hoyt, Helen (1931). The Name of a Rose. San Francisco: Self Published.
- Hoyt, Helen (1946). Poems Of Amis. Los Angeles.

== Quotation ==
"At present most of what we know, or think we know, of women has been found out by men,
we have yet to hear what woman will tell of herself, and where can she tell more intimately than in poetry?"

Others: A Magazine of the New Verse in 1916
