= Sadakichi Hartmann =

American art critic and poet (1867–1944)

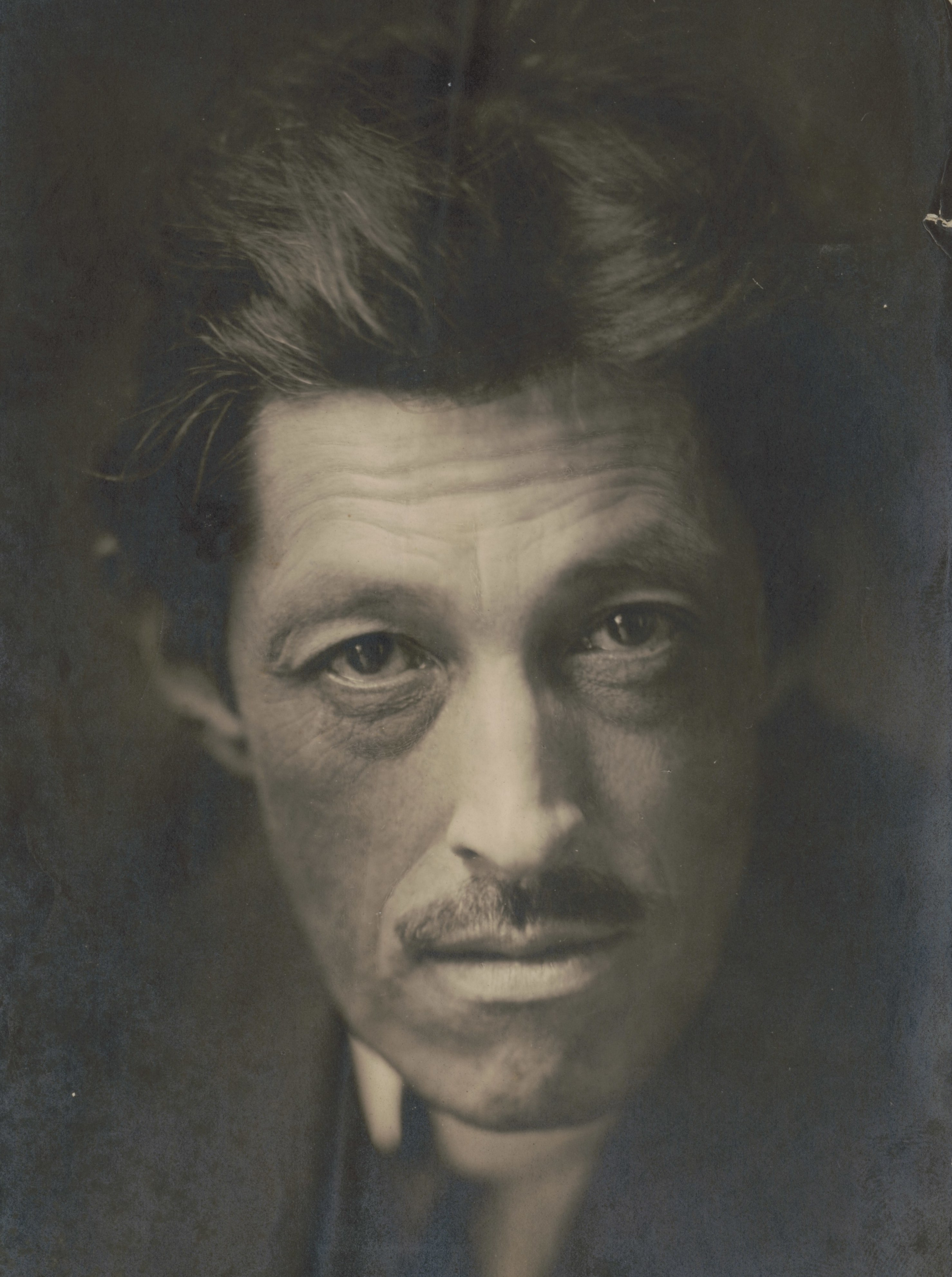
Sadakichi Hartmann, 1913

Carl Sadakichi Hartmann (November 8, 1867 – November 22, 1944) was an American art critic, poet, and anarchist.

== Biography ==
Hartmann, born on the artificial island of Dejima, Nagasaki, to a Japanese mother Osada Hartmann (who died soon after childbirth) and German businessman Carl Herman Oskar Hartmann and raised in Germany, arrived in Philadelphia in 1882 and became an American citizen in 1894. An important early participant in modernism, Hartmann was a friend of such diverse figures as Walt Whitman, Stéphane Mallarmé and Ezra Pound. From his experience of having known Walt Whitman, considered one of the great poets of the 19th century, he wrote Conversations with Walt Whitman (1895). He also wrote a collection of poetry in homage to Mallarmé, Naked Ghosts (1898).

Around 1905, Hartmann was an occasional performer at the New York City Miner's Theater. His act involved a device which dispensed perfumes in a manner intended to be analogous to notes in a symphony, which was poorly received by the crowd.

His poetry, deeply influenced by the Symbolists as well as orientalist literature, includes:

- 1904's Drifting Flowers of the Sea and Other Poems
- 1913's My Rubaiyat
- 1915's Japanese Rhythms

His works of criticism include Shakespeare in Art (1901) and Japanese Art (1904). During the 1910s, Hartmann let himself be crowned King of the Bohemians by Guido Bruno in New York's Greenwich Village. Hartmann wrote some of the earliest English language haiku.

He was one of the first critics to write about photography, with regular essays in Alfred Stieglitz's Camera Notes. Hartmann published criticism and conducted lecture tours under the pseudonym "Sidney Allen."

He made a brief appearance in the Douglas Fairbanks film The Thief of Bagdad as the court magician.

Later years found him living in Hollywood and, by 1942, on his daughter's ranch outside Banning, California. Due to his age and health conditions, Hartmann was one of only a few Japanese Americans on the West Coast to avoid the mass incarceration during World War II, although the FBI and local officials visited the ranch often to conduct investigations. In 1944, he died while visiting another daughter in St. Petersburg, Florida. A collection of his papers is held at the University of California, Riverside, including correspondence related to his obtaining permission to remain in Banning during the war.

== Personal life ==
Hartmann was a philosophical anarchist who traveled in the New York anarchist social circle as a friend of Emma Goldman and Alexander Berkman and as a drinking buddy of Hippolyte Havel. Though he was on the outskirts of the movement, he attended anarchist meetings, performed at the New York Ferrer Center, and met with Peter Kropotkin during his visit to the United States.

== Selected works ==
- Christ: A Dramatic Poem in Three Acts (play, 1893)
- Buddha: A Drama in Twelve Scenes (play, 1897)
- Mohammed (play, 1899)
- Schopenhauer in the Air: Seven Stories (1899)
- Shakespeare in Art (1900)
- A History of American Art (1901)
- Japanese Art (1903)
- Drifting Flowers of the Sea and Other Poems (1904)
- Landscape and Figure Composition (1910)
- My Theory of Soul Atoms (1910)
- The Whistler Book (1910)
- My Rubaiyat (1913)
- Permanent Peace: Is it a Dream? (1915)
- Tanka and Haikai: Japanese Rhythms (1916)
- The Last Thirty Days of Christ (1920)
- Confucius: A Drama in Two Acts (play, 1923)
- Moses: A Drama in Six Episodes (play, 1934)
- Buddha, Confucius, Christ: Three Prophetic Plays (reprint collection, 1971)

== Bibliography ==
- Avrich, Paul (1980). The Modern School Movement: Anarchism and Education in the United States. Princeton: Princeton University Press. ISBN 0-691-04669-7. OCLC 489692159.
