= Jethmal Parsram Gulrajani =

British Indian educationist, scholar (1885–1948)

Jethmal Parstram Gulrajani ڄيٺمل پرسرام گلراجاڻي
- Born: Jethmal; 1885 or 1886; Hyderabad, Bombay Presidency, British India (present-day Sindh, Pakistan)
- Died: 6 July 1948; Mumbai, India
- Education: Navelrai Hiranand Academy Hyderabad Sindh
- Occupations: Journalist, Publisher, Writer
- Writing career
- Genre: Prose
- Notable work: 60 books

Jethmal Parsram Gulrajani (Sindhi: ڄيٺمل پرسرام گلراجاڻي; 1885 or 1886 – 6 July 1948) was a journalist, publisher, and writer from Sindh, British India (now Pakistan). He authored 60 books, launched several newspapers and literary magazines, and co-founded the Sindhi Sahtya Society.

Jethmal was known for his fearless journalism and activism. He was arrested and imprisoned for writing editorials against the British Government of India. He also founded the New Sindhi Library and Sasti Saahat series under which he published more than a hundred books of standard merit, original and translated.

== Early life and education ==
Jethmal Parsram was born in Hyderabad, Sindh, British India (now Pakistan). The exact date of his birth is unknown. According to G.M. Syed, he was born in 1885. however, some sources state that his year of birth is 1886. Jethmal studied at the Nevalrai Hiranand Academy, Hyderabad and graduated from the Bombay University (now Mumbai University).

== Career ==
In 1902. In the same year, he was appointed as a teacher at his alma mater, Nevalrai Hiranand Academy, and later at Sindh Madersatul Islam High School in Karachi in 1910. Lalchand Amerdinomal, a renowned writer, was his colleague at Sindh Madersatul Islam High School. Jethmal also briefly served as the Headmaster of New High School Karachi but resigned in 1911. In 1916, he joined the Home Rule League led by Annie Besant and actively participated in the movement. Jethmal's presence became essential at literary, social, and political gatherings in Hyderabad from 1916 onwards. He was also known for his powerful public speaking abilities. In 1922, he became a professor of Sindhi at Sindh National College (now Government College University) Hyderabad and served there until 1941.

=== Journalism ===
Jethmal Parsram was one of the most celebrated Sindhi literary journalists. Together with his friend Lalchand Amardinomal, he founded the Sindhi Sahtya Society (Sindhi Literary Society) in 1914. Under the society's auspices, they launched the monthly Risalo, a literary magazine. After some time, Lalchand Amerdinomal assumed the role of editor for this magazine. In 1917, Jethmal launched the daily Hindvasi. As a fearless journalist, he penned an editorial titled "Kalalki Hut, Kusan jo Kopu Vahay" (Sindhi: ڪلالڪي ھٽ، ڪسڻ جو ڪوپ وھي), which translates to "people throne to the tavern to sever their heads in return for a draught." This title was a quote from the poetry of Shah Abdul Latif Bhitai. The editorial strongly criticized the killing of innocent individuals who had peacefully protested against the Rowlatt Act (1919) and condemned the Jallianwala Bagh massacre perpetrated by the British army. The British Government of India deemed this editorial seditious, leading to Jethmal's arrest and imprisonment. The daily Hindvasi underwent a name change to Bharatvasi during his imprisonment. Following his release from jail in 1921, Jethmal continued his role as an editor and publisher of this newspaper. Additionally, he introduced a monthly literary magazine called Rooh Rihan in 1921.

Around the same time, he initiated the establishment of the New Sindhi Library and introduced the Sasti Saahat (Cheap Literature) series, marking a significant milestone in Sindhi publication. Under this initiative, he published over a hundred books of exceptional quality, encompassing both original works and translations.

In 1929, he launched the weekly newspaper Sindh Herald. Furthermore, he took on the role of editor for the daily Parkash and served as the honorary editor for the weekly Sindhri.

=== Writing ===
Jethmal was not only a freedom fighter and journalist, he was also an illustrious scholar and writer of Sindhi language. He authored around 60 books. An incomplete alphabetical list of his books is presented below:

=== Books ===
- Anand Darbar [Sindhi: آنند درٻار]
- Apanshud Gayan [Sindhi: اپنشد گيان]
- Atam Veechar [Sindhi: آتم ويچار], (Thoughts on Soul)
- Bhagavad Gita [Sindhi: ڀڳوت گيتا]. (The translation of Annie Besant's book)
- Bal Hatia [Sindhi: ٻال ھتيا], (from Leo Tolstoy's play The Power of Darkness)
- Bhai Kalachand [Sindhi: ڀائي ڪلاچند]
- Budal Beri [Sindhi: ٻڏل ٻيڙي], (from Tagore's The Wreck)
- Chamraposh-joon-Akhanyoon [Sindhi: چمڙاپوش جون آکاڻيون], (Stories of a Disguised Person)
- Emerson [Sindhi: ايمرسن], (Translation of some famous vedantic essays)
- Faust [Sindhi: فائوسٽ], (Translation of Goethe's epic poem)
- Gal Blass [Sindhi: گال بلاس]
- Hamlet [Sindhi: ھيمليٽ], (Translation of Shakespeare's longest play)
- Hind aen Sindh ja Sant [Sindhi: ھند ۽ سنڌ جا سنت]
- Hisabi Hisab (from Shakespeare's Measure for Measure)
- Jagat ja Netao [Sindhi: جڳت جو نيتائو]
- Margjoti aien Karan [Sindhi: مرگ جوتي ۽ ڪرم]
- Maut Hik Bahanu [Sindhi: موت ھڪ بھانو]
- Maut ta aahayee kona [Sindhi: موت تہ آھي ئي ڪو نہ]
- Miran Bai [Sindhi: ميران ٻائي]
- Monna Vanna [Sindhi: مونا وانا], (From Maurice Maeterlinck's play of the same name)
- Nanik Yousuf [Sindhi: نانڪ يوسف]
- Om-ji-Akhani [Sindhi: اوم جي آکاڻي], (Story of Om)
- Paighamber-e-Islam [Sindhi: پيغمبر اسلام]
- Parlok man Paigham [Sindhi: پرلوڪ مان پيغام]
- Philosophy chhaa Aahay [Sindhi: فلاسافي ڇا آھي؟]
- Poorab Joti [Sindhi: پورب جوتي], (adapted from Edwin Arnold's The Light of Asia)
- Raj Gayan [Sindhi: راج گيان]
- Richh [Sindhi: رڇ], (from Anton Chekkov's play "The Bear")
- Sachal Sarmast [Sindhi: سچل سرمست]
- Sada Char [Sindhi: سدا چار], (with Lilaram Premchand)
- Sahati Rihan [ [Sindhi: ساھتي رھاڻ]]
- Samya Vad [Sindhi: ساميہ واد], (Socialism)
- Sanatan Dharam [Sindhi: سناتن ڌرم]
- Satgur jay charnan men [Sindhi: ستگروءَ جي چرنن ۾],
- Shabd Anahat [Sindhi: شبد اناھٽ], (The Voice of the Silence by Helena Petrovna Blavatsky)
- Shah Bhitaia Ji Hayati [Sindhi: شاھ ڀٽائيءَ جي حياتي], (Life of Shah Abdul Latif Bhitai)
- Shah-joon-Akhanyoon [Sindhi: شاھ جون آکاڻيون], (Stories from Shah)
- Shah-je-Akhaniyun-jee-Samjhani [Sindhi: شاھ جي آکاڻين جي سمجھاڻي], (Interpretation of Shah's stories)
- Shakespeare Through Indian Eye
- Sidhyoon ain Ghaker [Sindhi: سڌيون ۽ چڪر], (from Charles Leadbitter's famous book on Occultism).
- Sindh and its Sufis
- Sindhi Sahat Jo Khazano [Sindhi: سنڌي ساھت جو خزانو]
- Sindhi Soonhara [Sindhi: سڌي سونھارا]
- Sonu Gadahu [Sindhi: سونو گڏھ]
- Sufi Mat [Sindhi: صوفي مت]
- Sufi Sagora [Sindhi: صوفي سڳورا]
- Sukh Panth [Sindhi: سک پنٿ]
- Suraj Sagar [Sindhi: سورج ساگر]
- Toofan [Sindhi: طوفان] (from Shakespeare's Measure for Measure)
- Turung-jo-Tirith [Sindhi: ترنگ جو تيرٿ], (Pilgrimage of Prison)
- Upanishad Gyan [Sindhi: اپنشد گيان], (The Wisdom of the Upanishad by Annie Besant)
- Vidya Guru [Sindhi: وديا گرو]
- Yoga ji Samjhani [Sindhi: يوگا جي سمجھاڻي]

== Death ==
After the creation of Pakistan in 1947, he reluctantly departed from his homeland of Sindh and migrated to Bombay (now Mumbai), India, where he eventually died on July 6, 1948.

== Books on Jethmal Parsram ==
Deepchandra Belani has written a monogram on life and writings of Jethmal Parsram.
