= Des Imagistes =

Book edited by Ezra Pound

Des Imagistes: An Anthology
- Editor: Ezra Pound
- Subject: Imagism
- Publisher: The Glebe; Charles and Albert Boni; Poetry Bookshop
- Publication date: February 1914
- Publication place: United States

Des Imagistes: An Anthology, edited by Ezra Pound and published in 1914, was the first anthology of the Imagism movement. It was published in The Glebe in February 1914, and later that year as a book by Charles and Albert Boni in New York, and Harold Monro's Poetry Bookshop in London.

The eleven authors featured were: Richard Aldington, Skipwith Cannell, John Cournos, H. D., F. S. Flint, Ford Madox Ford, James Joyce, Amy Lowell, Ezra Pound, Allen Upward, and William Carlos Williams.

Aldington later wrote regarding the title: "What Ezra thought that meant remains a mystery, unless the word "Anthologie" was assumed to precede it. Amy Lowell's anthologies were called Some Imagist Poets, so she may have supposed that Ezra thought Des Imagistes meant 'Quelques Imagistes.' But why a French title for a collection of poems by a bunch of young American and English authors? Search me. Ezra liked foreign titles."
