= Hōdai Yamazaki =

Japanese writer

Hodai Yamazaki
- 山崎 方代
- Born: November 1, 1914; Kofu, Yamanashi, Japan
- Died: August 19, 1985 (aged 70); Kamakura, Kanagawa, Japan
- Occupation: poet
- Writing career
- Genre: tanka poetry

Hōdai Yamazaki (山崎 方代, Yamazaki Hōdai; November 1, 1914 – August 19, 1985) was a Japanese tanka poet active in Shōwa era Japan. His verses are characterized by the skillful use of colloquial language.

== Early life ==
Hōdai was born in Kōfu city in Yamanashi Prefecture. He was interested in literature from childhood, and began writing tanka and short stories for newspapers and magazines just after completing elementary school. In 1939, he moved to Yokohama. While living with his sister, he published (at his own expense) a mimeographed version his first poetry anthology Banshō kuriawase ("At All Cost").

Hōdai was conscripted into the Imperial Japanese Army in 1941 and, in 1943, was blinded in his right eye during combat; his left eye was also badly affected.

== Literary career ==
After the end of World War II, he resumed his creative activities, financing the publication of a tanka collection, Hōdai, in 1955. The work drew the attention of famed poet Yoshino Hideo, who took Hōdai in as his disciple. In 1971, he joined Okabe Keiichiro and others in bringing out the literary magazine Kanshō ("Temperate").

His other works include the anthologies Ubaguchi, Korogi and Kashō, and a collection of essays, Aojiso no hana (Shiso flower). He died in 1985 at the age of 70. A society in his honor was founded after his death and it continues to publish a magazine devoted to the study of his works.

Hōdai lived in Kamakura, Kanagawa prefecture from 1972 until his death, staying in a 4.5 tatami mat room lent to him by a friend, the proprietor of a local Chinese restaurant. His grave is in his home town of Kōfu, Yamanashi, but a memorial stone dedicated to Hōdai is located in the grounds of the temple of Zuisen-ji in Kamakura.

== See also ==
- Japanese literature
- List of Japanese authors
