= Imagism =

20th-century poetry movement

The expatriate American poet Ezra Pound in 1913; Pound collected poems from eleven poets in his first anthology of Imagist poetry, Des Imagistes, published in 1914.

Imagism was a movement in early-20th-century poetry that favoured precision of imagery and clear, sharp language. It is considered the first organized modernist literary movement in the English language. Imagism has been termed "a succession of creative moments" rather than a continuous or sustained period of development. The French academic René Taupin remarked that "it is more accurate to consider Imagism not as a doctrine, nor even as a poetic school, but as the association of a few poets who were for a certain time in agreement on a small number of important principles".

The Imagists rejected the sentiment and discursiveness typical of Romantic and Victorian poetry. In contrast to the contemporary Georgian poets, who were generally content to work within that tradition, Imagists called for a return to more Classical values, such as directness of presentation, economy of language, and a willingness to experiment with non-traditional verse forms; Imagists used free verse. A characteristic feature of the form is its attempt to isolate a single image to reveal its essence. This mirrors contemporary developments in avant-garde art, especially Cubism. Although these poets isolate objects through the use of what the American poet Ezra Pound called "luminous details", Pound's ideogrammic method of juxtaposing concrete instances to express an abstraction is similar to Cubism's manner of synthesizing multiple perspectives into a single image.

Imagist publications appearing between 1914 and 1917 featured works by many of the most prominent modernist figures in poetry and other fields, including Pound, H.D. (Hilda Doolittle), Amy Lowell, Ford Madox Ford, William Carlos Williams, F. S. Flint, and T. E. Hulme. The Imagists were centred in London, with members from Great Britain, Ireland and the United States. Somewhat unusually for the time, a number of women writers were major Imagist figures.

== Pre-Imagism ==
The origins of Imagism are to be found in two poems, Autumn and A City Sunset by T. E. Hulme. These were published in January 1909 by the Poets' Club in London in a booklet called For Christmas MDCCCCVIII. Hulme was a student of mathematics and philosophy; he had been involved in setting up the club in 1908 and was its first secretary. Around the end of 1908, he presented his paper A Lecture on Modern Poetry at one of the club's meetings. Writing in A. R. Orage's magazine The New Age, the poet and critic F. S. Flint (a champion of free verse and modern French poetry) was highly critical of the club and its publications.

From the ensuing debate, Hulme and Flint became close friends. In 1909, Hulme left the Poets' Club and started meeting with Flint and other poets in a new group which Hulme referred to as the "Secession Club"; they met at the Eiffel Tower restaurant in London's Soho to discuss plans to reform contemporary poetry through free verse and the tanka and haiku and through the removal of all unnecessary verbiage from poems. The interest in Japanese verse forms can be contextualized by the late Victorian and Edwardian revival of Chinoiserie and Japonism as witnessed in the 1890s vogue for William Anderson's Japanese prints donated to the British Museum as well as in the influence of woodblock prints on paintings by Monet, Degas and van Gogh. Direct literary models were available from a number of sources, including F. V. Dickins's 1866 Hyak nin is'shiu, or, Stanzas by a Century of Poets, Being Japanese Lyrical Odes, the first English-language version of the Hyakunin Isshū, a 13th-century anthology of 100 waka, the early 20th-century critical writings and poems of Sadakichi Hartmann, and contemporary French-language translations.

The American poet Ezra Pound was introduced to the group in April 1909 and found their ideas close to his own. In particular, Pound's studies of early European vernacular poetry had led him to an admiration of the condensed, direct expression that he detected in the writings of Arnaut Daniel, Dante, and Guido Cavalcanti, amongst others. For example, in his 1911–12 series of essays I gather the limbs of Osiris, Pound writes of Daniel's line "pensar de lieis m'es repaus" ("it rests me to think of her"), from the canzone En breu brizara'l temps braus: "You cannot get statement simpler than that, or clearer, or less rhetorical". These criteria—directness, clarity and lack of rhetoric—were to be amongst the defining qualities of Imagist poetry. Through his friendship with Laurence Binyon, Pound had already developed an interest in Japanese art by examining Nishiki-e prints at the British Museum, and he quickly became absorbed in the study of Japanese verse forms.

In a 1915 article in La France, French critic Remy de Gourmont described the Imagists as descendants of the French Symbolists. Pound emphasised that influence in a 1928 letter to the French critic and translator René Taupin. He pointed out that Hulme was indebted to the Symbolist tradition, via W. B. Yeats, Arthur Symons and the Rhymers' Club generation of British poets and Mallarmé. Taupin concluded in his 1929 study that however great the divergence of technique and language "between the image of the Imagist and the 'symbol' of the Symbolists[,] there is a difference only of precision". In 1915, Pound edited the poetry of another 1890s poet, Lionel Johnson. In his introduction, he wrote

No one has written purer imagism than [Johnson] has, in the line
Clear lie the fields, and fade into blue air,
It has a beauty like the Chinese.

== Early publications and statements of intent ==
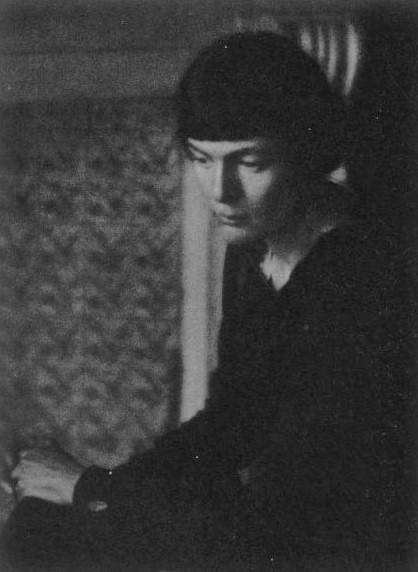
H.D. in 1917

In 1911, Pound introduced two other poets to the Eiffel Tower group: his former fiancée Hilda Doolittle, who by then was writing under her initials, H.D., and H.D.'s future husband Richard Aldington. These two were interested in exploring Greek poetic models, especially Sappho, an interest that Pound shared. The compression of expression that they achieved by following the Greek example complemented the proto-Imagist interest in Japanese poetry, and, in 1912, during a meeting with them in the British Museum tea room, Pound told H.D. and Aldington that they were Imagistes and even appended the signature H.D. Imagiste to some poems they were discussing.

When Harriet Monroe started her Poetry magazine in 1911, she had asked Pound to act as foreign editor. In October 1912, he submitted thereto three poems each by H.D. and Aldington under the Imagiste rubric, with a note describing Aldington as "one of the 'Imagistes'". This note, along with the appendix note ("The Complete Poetical Works of T. E. Hulme") in Pound's book Ripostes (1912), are considered to be the first appearances of the word "Imagiste" (later anglicised to "Imagist") in print.

Aldington's poems, Choricos, To a Greek Marble, and Au Vieux Jardin, were in the November issue of Poetry, and H.D.'s, Hermes of the Ways, Priapus, and Epigram, appeared in the January 1913 issue, marking the beginning of the Imagism movement. Poetry's April issue published Pound's haiku-like "In a Station of the Metro":

The apparition of these faces in the crowd :
Petals on a wet, black bough .

The March 1913 issue of Poetry contained A Few Don'ts by an Imagiste and the essay entitled Imagisme both written by Pound, with the latter attributed to Flint. The latter contained this succinct statement of the group's position, which he had agreed with H.D. and Aldington:

1. Direct treatment of the "thing", whether subjective or objective.
2. To use absolutely no word that does not contribute to the presentation.
3. As regarding rhythm: to compose in sequence of the musical phrase, not in sequence of the metronome.

Pound's note opened with a definition of an image as "that which presents an intellectual and emotional complex in an instant of time". Pound goes on to state,"It is better to present one Image in a lifetime than to produce voluminous works". His list of "don'ts" reinforced his three statements in "Imagism", while warning that they should not be considered as dogma but as the "result of long contemplation". Taken together, these two texts comprised the Imagist programme for a return to what they saw as the best poetic practice of the past. F. S. Flint commented "we have never claimed to have invented the moon. We do not pretend that our ideas are original."

The 1916 preface to Some Imagist Poets comments "Imagism does not merely mean the presentation of pictures. Imagism refers to the manner of presentation, not to the subject."

== Des Imagistes ==
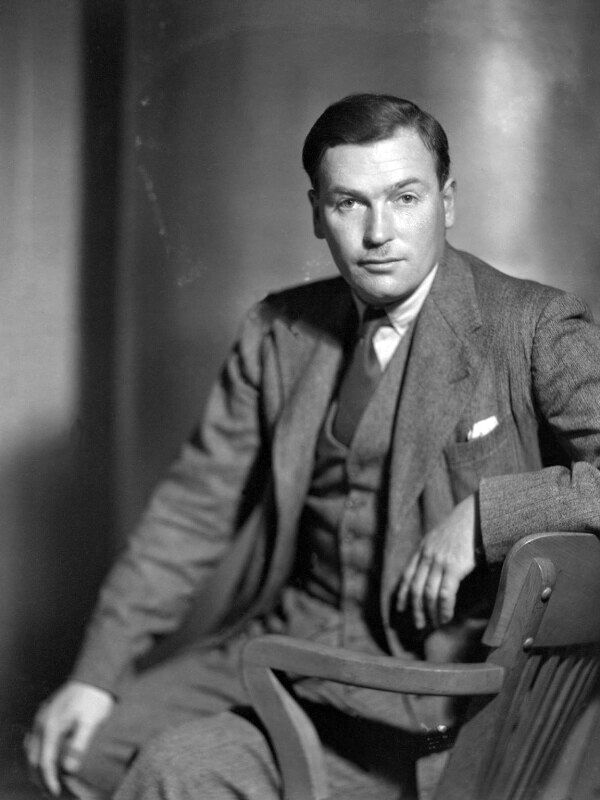
Richard Aldington in 1931

Determined to promote the work of the Imagists, and particularly of Aldington and H.D., Pound decided to publish an anthology under the title Des Imagistes. It was first published in Alfred Kreymborg's little magazine The Glebe and was later published in 1914 by Albert and Charles Boni in New York and by Harold Monro at the Poetry Bookshop in London. It became one of the most important and influential English-language collections of modernist verse. Included in the thirty-seven poems were ten poems by Aldington, seven by H.D., and six by Pound. The book also included work by Flint, Skipwith Cannell, Amy Lowell, William Carlos Williams, James Joyce, Ford Madox Ford, Allen Upward and John Cournos.

Pound's editorial choices were based on what he saw as the degree of sympathy that the writers displayed with Imagist precepts, rather than active participation in a group. Williams, based in the United States, had not participated in any of the discussions of the Eiffel Tower group. However, he and Pound had long been corresponding on the question of the renewal of poetry along similar lines. Ford was included at least partly because of his strong influence on Pound, as the younger poet made the transition from his earlier, Pre-Raphaelite-influenced style towards a harder, more modern way of writing. The anthology included the poem I Hear an Army by James Joyce, which was sent to Pound by W. B. Yeats.

== Some Imagist Poets ==
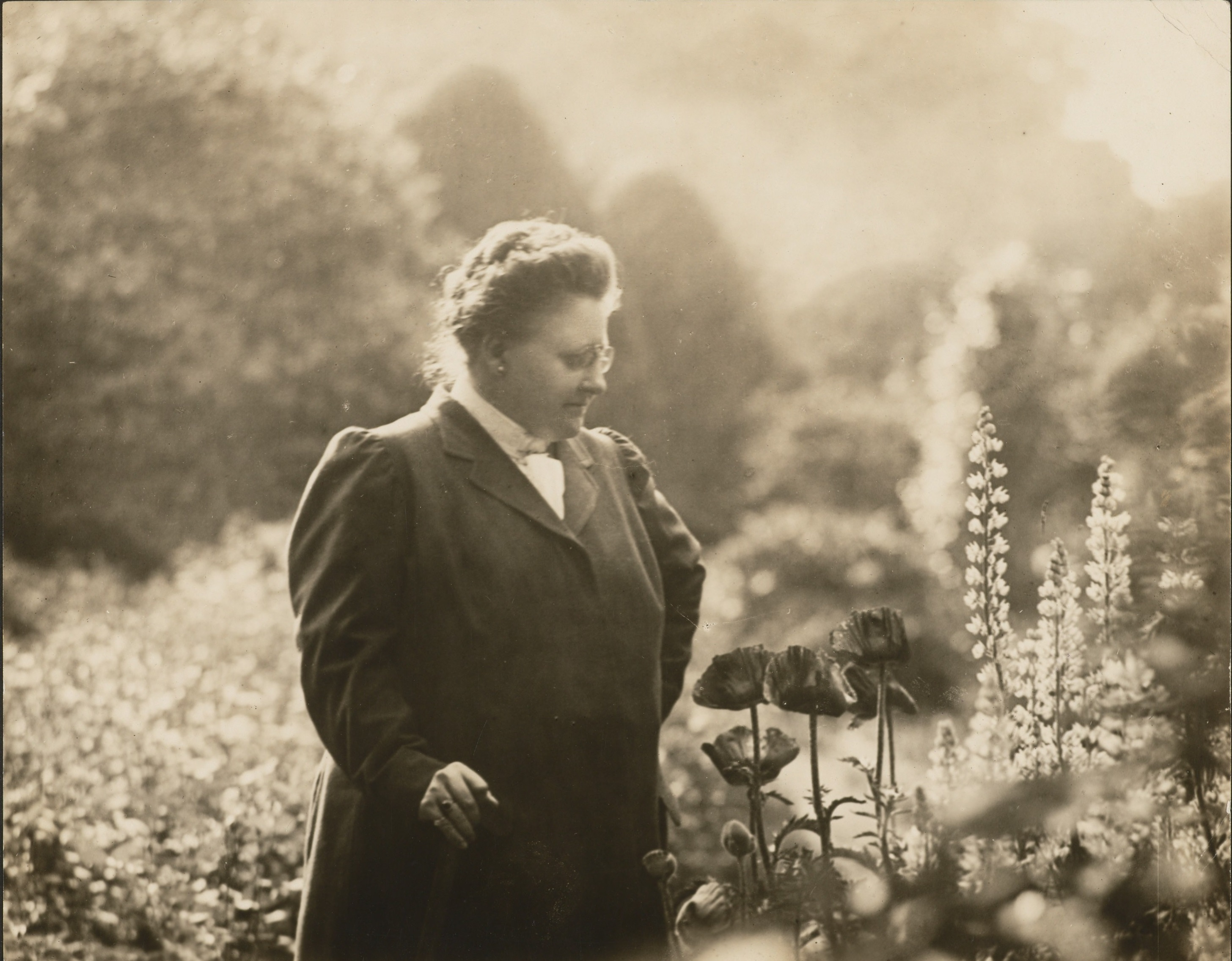
The American Imagist Amy Lowell, who edited later volumes of Some Imagist Poets; in 1925, Lowell was awarded the Pulitzer Prize for Poetry.

An article on the history of Imagism was written by Flint and published in The Egoist in May 1915. Pound disagreed with Flint's interpretation of events and the goals of the group, causing the two to cease contact with each other. Flint emphasised the contribution of the Eiffel Tower poets, especially Edward Storer. Pound, who believed that the "Hellenic hardness" that he saw as the distinguishing quality of the poems of H.D. and Aldington was likely to be diluted by the "custard" of Storer, was to play no further direct role in the history of the Imagists. He went on to co-found the Vorticists with his friend, the painter and writer Wyndham Lewis.

Around this time, the American Imagist Amy Lowell moved to London, determined to promote her own work and that of the other Imagist poets. Lowell was a wealthy heiress from Boston, whose brother Abbott Lawrence Lowell was President of Harvard University from 1909 to 1933. She was an enthusiastic champion of literary experiment who was willing to use her money to publish the group. Lowell was determined to change the method of selection from Pound's autocratic editorial attitude to a more democratic manner. The outcome was a series of Imagist anthologies under the title Some Imagist Poets. The first of these appeared in 1915, planned and assembled mainly by H.D. and Aldington. Two further issues, both edited by Lowell, were published in 1916 and 1917. These three volumes featured most of the original poets, plus the American John Gould Fletcher, but not Pound, who had tried to persuade Lowell to drop the Imagist name from her publications and who sardonically dubbed this phase of Imagism "Amygism".

Lowell persuaded D. H. Lawrence to contribute poems to the 1915 and 1916 volumes, making him the only writer to publish as both a Georgian poet and an Imagist. Marianne Moore also became associated with the group during this period. With World War I as a backdrop, the times were not easy for avant-garde literary movements (Aldington, for example, spent much of the war at the front), and the 1917 anthology effectively marked the end of the Imagists as a movement.

== After Imagism ==
In 1929, Walter Lowenfels jokingly suggested that Aldington should produce a new Imagist anthology. Aldington, by now a successful novelist, took up the suggestion and enlisted the help of Ford and H.D. The result was the Imagist Anthology 1930, edited by Aldington and including all the contributors to the four earlier anthologies with the exception of Lowell, who had died, Cannell, who had disappeared, and Pound, who declined. The appearance of this anthology initiated a critical discussion of the place of the Imagists in the history of 20th-century poetry.

Of the poets who were published in the various Imagist anthologies, Joyce, Lawrence and Aldington are now primarily remembered and read as novelists. Marianne Moore, who was at most a fringe member of the group, carved out a unique poetic style of her own that retained an Imagist concern with compression of language. William Carlos Williams developed his poetic along distinctly American lines with his variable foot and a diction he claimed was taken "from the mouths of Polish mothers". Both Pound and H.D. turned to long form poetry, but retained the hard edge to their language as an Imagist legacy. Most of the other members of the group are largely forgotten outside the context of Imagism.

== Legacy ==
Despite the movement's short life, Imagism would deeply influence the course of modernist poetry in English. Richard Aldington, in his 1941 memoir, writes: "I think the poems of Ezra Pound, H.D., Lawrence, and Ford Madox Ford will continue to be read. And to a considerable extent T. S. Eliot and his followers have carried on their operations from positions won by the Imagists."

On the other hand, the American poet Wallace Stevens found shortcomings in the Imagist approach: "Not all objects are equal. The vice of Imagism was that it did not recognize this." With its demand for hardness, clarity and precision and its insistence on fidelity to appearances coupled with its rejection of irrelevant subjective emotions Imagism had later effects that are demonstrable in T. S. Eliot's Preludes and Morning at the Window and in Lawrence's animal and flower pieces. The rejection of conventional verse forms in the nineteen-twenties owed much to the Imagists' repudiation of the Georgian Poetry style.

Imagism, which had made free verse a discipline and a legitimate poetic form, influenced a number of poetry circles and movements. Its influence can be seen clearly in the work of the Objectivist poets, who came to prominence in the 1930s under the auspices of Pound and Williams. The Objectivists worked mainly in free verse. Clearly linking Objectivism's principles with Imagism's, Louis Zukofsky insisted, in his introduction to the 1931 Objectivist issue of Poetry, on writing "which is the detail, not mirage, of seeing, of thinking with the things as they exist, and of directing them along a line of melody." Zukofsky was a major influence on the Language poets, who carried the Imagist focus on formal concerns to a high level of development. In his seminal 1950 essay Projective Verse, Charles Olson, the theorist of the Black Mountain poets, wrote "One perception must immediately and directly lead to a further perception", his credo derived from and supplemented the Imagists.

Among the Beats, Gary Snyder and Allen Ginsberg in particular were influenced by the Imagist emphasis on Chinese and Japanese poetry. Williams also had a strong effect on the Beat poets, encouraging poets like Lew Welch and writing an introduction for the book publication of Ginsberg's Howl (1955).

== Sources ==
- Aldington, Richard; Gates, Norman (1984). Richard Aldington: An Autobiography in Letters. University Park: Pennsylvania State University Press
- Aldington, Richard (1941). Life For Life's Sake. New York: Viking Press
- Ayers, David (2004). H. D., Ezra Pound and Imagism, in Modernism: A Short Introduction. Blackwell Publishers. ISBN 978-1-4051-0854-6
- DuPlessis, Rachel Blau (1986). H.D.: The Career of That Struggle. The Harvester Press. ISBN 0-7108-0548-9
- Bercovitch, Sacvan; Patell, Cyrus RK. (1994). The Cambridge History of American Literature. Cambridge: Cambridge University Press. ISBN 978-0-521-49733-6
- Bradshaw, Melissa; Munich, Adrienne (2002). Selected Poems of Amy Lowell. New Brunswick NJ: Rutgers University Press. ISBN 978-0-8135-3128-1
- Brooker, Jewel Spears (1996). Mastery and Escape: T. S. Eliot and the Dialectic of Modernism. University of Massachusetts Press. ISBN 1-55849-040-X
- Carpenter, Humphrey (1988). A Serious Character: The Life of Ezra Pound. Boston: Houghton Mifflin. ISBN 978-0-395-41678-5
- Cookson, William (ed) (1975). Selected Prose, 1909–1965. London: New Directions Publishing. ISBN 978-0-8112-0574-0
- Crunden, Robert (1993). American Salons: Encounters with European Modernism, 1885–1917. Oxford: Oxford University Press. ISBN 978-0-1950-6569-5
- Davidson, Michael (1997). Ghostlier Demarcations: Modern Poetry and the Material Word. University of California Press. ISBN 0-520-20739-4
- Elder, R. Bruce (1998). The Films of Stan Brakhage in the American Tradition of Ezra Pound, Gertrude Stein and Charles Olson. Wilfrid Laurier University Press. ISBN 0-88920-275-3
- Ellmann, Richard (1959). James Joyce. Oxford: Oxford University Press
- Enck, John (1964). Wallace Stevens: Images and Judgments. Carbondale, IL: Southern Illinois University Press
- Geiger, Don (1956). "Imagism; the New Poetry Forty Years Later". Prairie Schooner, volume 30, No. 2. JSTOR 40625011
- Jones, Peter (ed.) (1972). Imagist Poetry. Penguin. ISBN 978-0-1419-1314-8
- Kenner, Hugh (1975). The Pound Era. Faber and Faber. ISBN 0-571-10668-4
- King, Michael; Pearson, Norman (1979). H. D., and Ezra Pound, End to Torment: A Memoir of Ezra Pound. New York: New Directions, 1979. ISBN 978-0-8112-0720-1
- Kita, Yoshiko (2000). "Ezra Pound and Haiku: Why Did Imagists Hardly Mention Basho?". Paideuma: Modern and Contemporary Poetry and Poetics, volume 29, No. 3. JSTOR 24726040
- Kolocotroni, Vassiliki; Goldman, Jane; Taxidou, Olga (1998). Modernism: An Anthology of Sources and Documents. University of Chicago Press. ISBN 978-0-226-45074-2
- Lawrence, D. H. (1979). The Letters of D. H. Lawrence. Cambridge: Cambridge University Press
- Martin, Wallace (1970). "The Sources of the Imagist Aesthetic". PMLA, volume 85, No. 2. JSTOR 1261393
- McGuinness, Patrick (1998). T. E. Hulme: Selected Writings. Fyfield Books, Carcanet Press. ISBN 1-85754-362-9 (pp. xii–xiii)
- Ming, Xie (1998). Ezra Pound and the Appropriation of Chinese Poetry: Cathay, Translation, and Imagism. New York: Routledge. ISBN 978-0-8153-2623-6
- Moody, A. David (2007). Ezra Pound: Poet. A Portrait of the Man and His Work. I: The Young Genius 1885–1920. Oxford: Oxford University Press. ISBN 978-0-19-957146-8
- Olson, Charles (1966). Selected Writings. London: New Directions Publishing. ISBN 978-0-8112-0335-7
- Pondrom, Cyrena (1969). "Selected Letters from H. D. to F. S. Flint: A Commentary on the Imagist Period". Contemporary Literature, volume 10, issue 4.JSTOR 1207696
- Pound, Ezra (1974) [June 1914]. "How I Began". In Grace Schulman (ed.). Ezra Pound: A Collection of Criticism. New York: McGraw-Hill Book Company. ISBN 0-07-055634-2
- Pound, Ezra (1970). Pound/Joyce: The Letters of Ezra Pound to James Joyce. Edited by Forrest Read. New York: New Directions Publishing. ISBN 0-8112-0159-7
- Pound, Ezra (ed.) (1914). Des Imagistes. New York: Albert and Charles Boni.
- Pound, Ezra (March 1913). "A Few Don'ts by an Imagiste". Poetry. I(6)
- Riddel, Joseph (1979). "Decentering the Image: The 'Project' of 'American' Poetics?". Boundary 2, volume 8, issue 1. JSTOR 303146
- Sloan, De Villo (1987). "The Decline of American Postmodernism". SubStance, University of Wisconsin Press, volume 16, issue 3. JSTOR 3685195
- Stanley, Sandra (1995). "Louis Zukofsky and the Transformation of a Modern American Poetics". South Atlantic Review, volume 60. JSTOR 3200737
- Sullivan, J. P. (ed.) (1970). Ezra Pound. Penguin Critical Anthologies Series. ISBN 0-14-080033-6
- Thacker, Andrew (2018). The Imagist Poets. Tavistock: Northcote House Publishers. ISBN 978-0-7463-1002-1
- Wącior, Sławomir (2007). Explaining Imagism: The Imagist Movement in Poetry and Art. Edwin Mellen Press. ISBN 0773454276
- Williams, Louise Blakeney (2002). Modernism and the Ideology of History: Literature, Politics, and the Past. Cambridge University Press. ISBN 0-521-81499-5
