= Poetry Bookshop =

English bookshop

Coordinates: 51°31′15″N 0°7′17″W

The Poetry Bookshop operated at 35 Devonshire Street (now Boswell Street) in the Bloomsbury district of central London, from 1913 to 1926. It was the brainchild of Harold Monro, and was supported by his moderate income.

The Bookshop not only sold, but also published, poetry by living poets. Readers were encouraged to browse, and several poets actually made their home there, including Wilfred Owen, Wilfrid Wilson Gibson and Robert Frost. The atmosphere was welcoming, and the shop's best-sellers were hand-coloured rhyme sheets for children.

During World War I, when Monro was serving in the armed forces, the shop was run almost single-handedly by his assistant, Alida Klementaski, whom he later married.

Among the works published by the Poetry Bookshop were collections by Charlotte Mew and Richard Aldington and the Georgian Poetry series as well as Ezra Pound's seminal 1914 anthology Des Imagistes.

Penelope Fitzgerald for quite a few years attempted to interest a publisher in a book on the shop. Her letters reveal the amount of work she did, some of which was useful to her when she wrote her biography of Charlotte Mew.
