= Arthur Knowles Sabin =

Arthur Knowles Sabin (1879-1959), was a writer, poet and printer, best known for his development of the Bethnal Green Museum, now the Young V&A, in London.

== Life ==
Arthur K Sabin was born in Rotherham in 1879, the son of a Sheffield steel worker. He was largely self-educated. He married Elizabeth Thompson in 1903.

He moved to Cranleigh, in Surrey. Here he wrote several poems, and became involved in the Samurai Press, which had been set up in Norwich by Harold Browne and Harold Monro. The press had moved to Cranleigh in 1906.

In 1909, he took up a post as Keeper at the Victoria and Albert Museum and bought a house at 14 Palmerston Road, East Sheen, where he established a printing press in a shed. He issued several books and pamphlets which are now collector's items, under the imprint of the Temple Sheen Press.

In 1922, he was appointed as curator of the Victoria and Albert's Bethnal Green Museum, and left East Sheen. Noting how children were bored by the museum’s contents and layout, he began to collect toys and other childhood-related items. He was enthusiastically supported by Queen Mary, who donated some of her own childhood toys, and Mary Greg. He remained in this post until 1940.

He died in 1959.

== Literary output ==
- Typhon and other Poems (1902)
- The Death of Icarus and Other Poems, together with a new translation in terza rima from the Purgatory of Dante (Canto XXVIII.) (1906)
- The Wayfarers (1907)
- The rustic choir and other poems (1908)
- Dante and Beatrice (1908)
- Medea and Circe, and other poems, with an introduction by Richard G. Moulton (1911)
- War Harvest 1914 (1914)
- Christmas 1914 (1914)
- New poems (1915)
- War posters issued by belligerent and neutral nations 1914-1919(1920: with Martin Hardie)
- East London Poems and others (1931)

Sabin was also responsible for several catalogues at the Victoria and Albert and Bethnal Green Museums.
