= Alexander Kruse =

American painter

- Born: February 9, 1888; New York, New York, United States
- Died: March 31, 1972 (aged 84); Los Angeles, California, United States
- Occupation: Painter

Alexander Kruse (February 9, 1888 – March 31, 1972) was an American painter. His work was part of the painting event in the art competition at the 1932 Summer Olympics.
