= Lalchand Amardinomal =

Indian Sindhi writer (1885–1954)

Lalchand Amardinomal Jagtiani
- Born: لالچند امرڏنومل جڳتياڻي; 25 January 1885; Hyderabad, Bombay Presidency, British India (Now Pakistan)
- Died: 18 April 1954 (aged 69)
- Education: B.A.
- Alma mater: Union Academy Hyderabad, Sindh.
- Occupations: Story writer, dramatist, essayist, translator
- Writing career
- Period: 1805–1948
- Genres: Prose, one-act plays, fiction
- Notable work: More than 62 books

Lalchand Amardinomal Jagtiani (Sindhi: لالچند امرڏنومل جڳتياڻي; 25 January 1885 – 18 April 1954) was a story writer, novelist and essayist healing from Hyderabad, Sindh, British India (now Pakistan). In a prolific career, he penned a remarkable total of 62 books, encompassing diverse genres such as one-act plays, short stories, literary criticism, and scholarly articles.

== Early life ==
Lalchand was born on 25th January 1885 in Hyderabad, Sindh, British India (now Pakistan). His father, Deewan Amerdino, held the position of Mukhtiarkar in the Revenue Department of Sindh. He received primary education privately at home. In 1903, he successfully completed his matriculation examination from Hiranand Academy (now Government Naval Rai Hiranand High School Society No. 1) Hyderabad. Following this, he was appointed as a school teacher at Sindh Madersatul Islam High School in Karachi (now Sindh Madarsatul Islam University). Lalchand later served as a school teacher and then headmaster at New High School in Karachi. Alongside his teaching profession, he continued his studies and earned a Bachelor of Arts degree in 1918.

== Literary Contributions ==
Lalchand Amardinomal Jagtiani developed a keen interest in reading and literature from an early age. At the age of 20, he achieved a significant milestone with the publication of his first novel, "Choth jo Chand" (Sindhi: چوٿ جو چنڊ).

Lalchand Amardinomal is renowned as one of the modern writers in Sindhi literature, credited with introducing rhythmic prose and travelogue to the genre. He is considered a legendary figure in Sindhi literature, authoring numerous novels, short stories, essays, and research articles. His work drew inspiration from classical poets such as Shah Abdul Latif Bhittai, Sachal Sarmast, Saami, Ruhal Faquir, Khalifo Gul Muhammad Gul, among others. In total, he wrote over 62 books.

In 1914, Lalchand Amardinomal established the Sindhi Sahetia Society, which played a pivotal role in the development of Sindhi literature. Under its auspices, literary books were published every month for a remarkable period of 15 years. Additionally, he served as the Joint Secretary of the Central Advisory Board for Sindhi Literature in 1940. He also held the position of founding managing editor of "Mehran", the quarterly literary magazine of Sindhi Adabi Board.

== Dramatic Societies ==
Lalchand Amardinomal founded the dramatic society Banday Matarm Natak Mandly in 1905. He authored several plays for the society including Bharat Java – Uth Uthy Jag (Sindhi: ڀارت ڄاوا اُٿ اُٿي جاڳ) and Amaldar keen Riasat Azar (Sindhi: عملدار ڪين رياست آزار) . In 1923, Rabindranath Tagore Literary and Dramatic Club was founded in Hyderabad and Karachi . The club's inauguration was graced by Rabindranath Tagore himself, upon the invitation of Khanchand Daryani and Lalchand Amardinomal. Eminent writers such as Jethmal Prasram, Deyaldas Lalwani, and Mangharam Malkani were also associated with the club.

== Books ==
Lalchand Amardinomal Jagtiani authored more than 62 books. Niaz Masroor Badvi has compiled a list of his 62 books. The following table contains a list of his 21 famous books.

	Name of the Book	Name of the Book in Sindhi Language	Description and publication
1	Choth Jo Chand (Crescent Moon)	چوٿ جو چنڊ	A Novel first published in 1905 and 1906, 1927 and 1947.
2	Naqad Dharam (Religion of Cash)	نقد ڌرم	One-act play published in 1906.
3	Sen keen ven (Inlaws or enemies)	سيڻ ڪين ويڻ	One-act play published in 1907.
4	Hyderabad Sindh	حيدرآباد سنڌ	Published in 1910
5	Muhammad Rasulullah (Peace be upon him)	محمد رسول اللّٰہ صلي اللّٰہ عليہ وسلم	Biography of the Islamic prophet Muhammad published in 1911.
6	Hura Mukhia Ja (The Hurs of Mukhi)	حُرَ مکيءَ جا	Published in 1913. This booklet is about Hur Movement against the British rule in India.
7	Shahano Shah (Kingly Shah)	شاھاڻو شاھ	A book written on the poetry of Shah Abdul Latif Bhitai. Published in 1914. Most recent edition published in 1989.
8	Soonharo Sachal (Beauteous Sachal)	سونھارو سچل	Biography and poetry of Sachal Sarmast published in 1914.
9	Ram Badshah	رام بادشاھ	an account of the life and teachings of Swami Ram Tirtha, published in 1914.
10	Musafreea jo Mazo aien Sair	مسافريءَ جو مزو ۽ سير	A travelogue published in 1915.
11	Kishnia Jo Kasht (Sorrows of Kashni)	ڪشنيءَ جو ڪشٽ	A novel published in 1917. Also published by Sindhi Times Publications Ulhasnagar in 1985.
12	Sona Warniyoon Dilyoon (Hearts of Gold)	سون ورنيون دليون	A translated novel first published in 1925 and then in 1928. Also published by Sindhi Adabi Board in 1956, 1972, 1979 and 1992.
13	Sadaa Gulab (Perennial Roses)	سدا گلاب	This is translation of Tagore's "The Gardener" in rhythmic prose.
14	Berangi Bagha Jo Gul Sindhi (The Rose of Sind)	بيرنگي باغ جو گل سنڌي	appraisal of the poetry of Khalifo Gul Muhammad Gul published in 1920.
15	Amaldar ken Raiyat Azar? (Officers or Tyrants?)	عملدار ڪين رعيت بيزار	One-act play published in 1920.
16	Dukhan Dadhi Zindagi (A life of Suffering)	ڏکن ڏڌي زندگي	Short stories published in 1925.
17	Umar Marvi	عمر مارئي	Stage Drama (1925)
18	Manika, Moti, Laal	ماڻڪ، موتي، لال	Biographies and poetry of selected classical poets, published in 1927.
19	Phulan Muth (Handful of Flowers)	ڦلن مٺ	ِِEssay collection published in 1927.
20	Hisdustan Ji Tareekha	ھندستان جي تاريخ	A book on the history of India.
21	Matamian khay Dildari	ماتمين کي دلداري	This is translation of "To those who mourn" by C.W. Leadbeater

== Death ==
After the partition of India in 1947, Lalchand Amardinomal, albeit reluctantly, departed from Sindh and migrated to India. In anticipation of his eventual passing, he made a specific request in his will for his ashes to be scattered over the Sindhu (Indus) River. On 18 April 1954, Lalchand Amardinomal died in India. As per his final wish, his ashes were transported to the Indus River, near Gidu Bander (Hussainabad), Hyderabad, Sindh, and scattered there on 18 April 1956.
