= The Glebe (literary magazine) =

American literary magazine

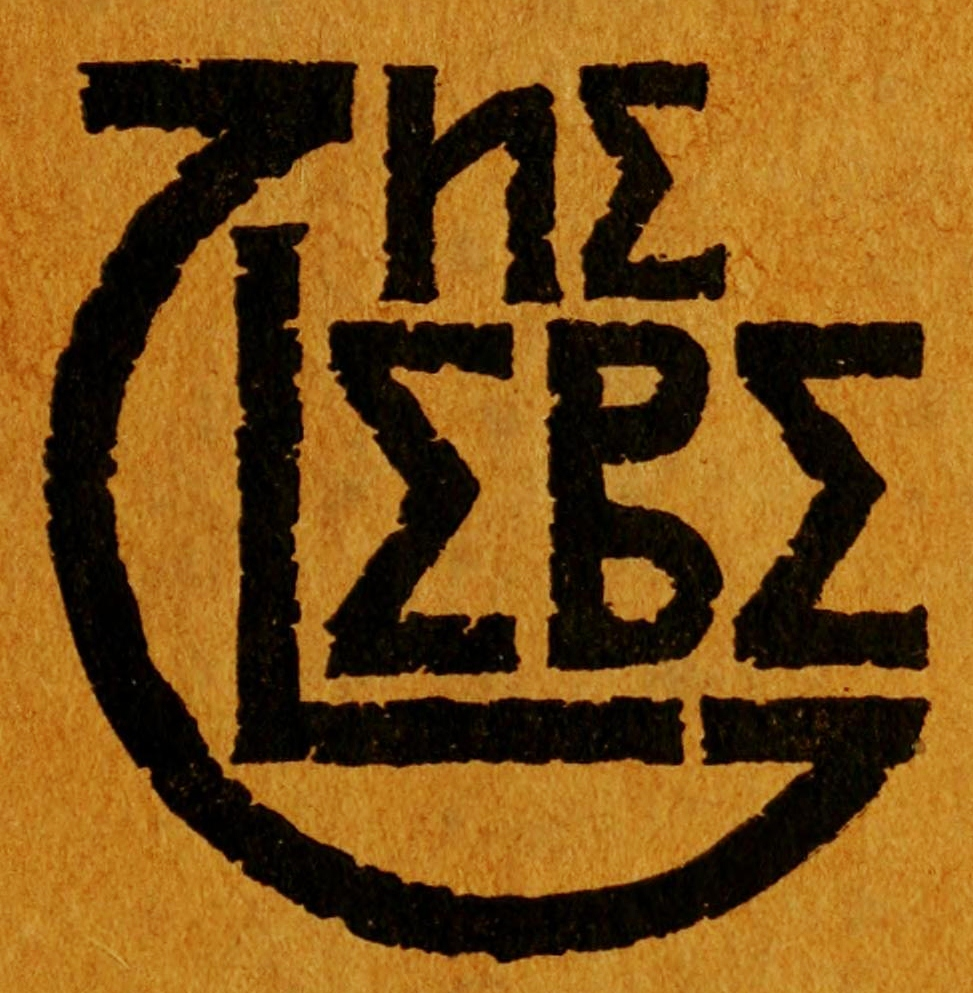
The Glebe logo 1913

The Glebe was a literary magazine edited by Alfred Kreymborg and Man Ray from 1913 to 1914. The first issue was published from Grantwood, New Jersey while the rest of the run was published in New York by Albert & Charles Boni. Ten issues were produced, with a circulation of 300. Issue number 5 comprised the first anthology of Imagism: Des Imagistes.

== Issues and Contributors ==
Vol. 1, No. 1 - September 1913 - Adolf Wolff: Songs, Sighs and Curses (collected poems).
Vol. 1, No. 2 - October 1913 - Wallace E. Baker: Diary of a Suicide (diary).
Vol. 1, No. 3 - December 1913 - Charles Demuth: The Azure Adder (play).
Vol. 1, No. 4 - January 1914 - Leonid Andreyev: Love of One's Neighbor (play, translated by Thomas Seltzer)
Vol. 1, No. 5 - February 1914 - Ezra Pound (editor): Des Imagistes: An Anthology (poetry by 11 authors)
Vol. 1, No. 6 - March 1914 - Alfred Kreymborg: Erna Vitek (novel).

Vol. 2, No. 1 - April 1914 - Horace L. Traubel: Collects (essays).
Vol. 2, No. 2 - September 1914 - George W. Cronyn: Poems
Vol. 2, No. 3 - October 1914 - Frank Wedekind: Erdgeist (Earth Spirit; play in verse translated by Samuel A. Eliot, Jr.).
Vol. 2. No. 4 - November 1914 - Frank Wedekind: Pandora's Box (play in verse translated by Samuel A. Eliot, Jr.).

== See also ==
- 1913 in poetry
- 1914 in poetry
