= F. S. Flint =

English poet and translator

Frank Stuart Flint (19 December 1885 – 28 February 1960) was an English poet and translator who was a prominent member of the Imagist group. Ford Madox Ford called him "one of the greatest men and one of the beautiful spirits of the country".

== Life and career ==
Flint was a British poet and poetry reviewer with an unusual gift for language. A self-educated man born in Islington, London, Flint left school at 13 and worked in various capacities before beginning his long and distinguished career in the Civil Service in 1904. He published a book on French poets, starting in 1908 and by 1910, his intensive private study had gained him recognition as one of Britain's most highly informed authorities on modern French poetry. His first collection of poems, In the Net of the Stars (1909), consisted mainly of conventional love lyrics.

Flint is mostly known for his participation in the "School of Images" with Ezra Pound and T. E. Hulme in 1909, of which he gave an account in the "Poetry Review" in 1909, and which was to serve as the theoretical basis for the later Imagist movement (1913). His subsequent association with Ezra Pound and T. E. Hulme, together with his deepening knowledge of innovative French poetic techniques, radically affected his poetry's development.

Glenn Hughes reports Flint claiming to invent the open verse form 'unrhymed cadence', by cutting away all personal emotion, where symbolism was barely suggested, but instead shortened and hardened, and where meter was supplanted by cadence'. Hughes explaining Flint's form is best understood 'by comparing his poem ' A Swan Song'(Published in 1909 and later by Pound in 1914 in 'Des Imagistes') and, his later 'cadenced ' version thereof, ' The Swan', a poem so devoid of superfluities and cliches, to achieve that perfect chiseled beauty which is the essence of classical art'

In 1916 Flint was described as having ' the gift of artistic courage clothed in beauty which will help build the poetry of the future'. Flint himself, considered his 'cadenced' form to be a reversion to the real tradition of the English poetry of Cynewulf in the 'Riddle, The Nightingale'

Earlier Flint had published a series of articles on contemporary French poets (1912) that much influenced his contemporaries. In 1914 he was included by Pound in Des Imagistes. He entered into a short-lived dispute with Pound as to each one's relative contribution to the Imagist movement.

During the 1930s Flint was among a number of poets who moved away from poetry and towards economics, working for the Statistics Division of the Ministry of Labour writing that "[t]he proper study of mankind is, for the time being, economics". Flint would go on to publish an article entitled The Plain Man and Economics in The Criterion in 1937. He became a leading spokesman for Imagism and exemplified its methods in the concentration and clarity displayed by much of the work in Cadences (1915). Otherworld, his third and last collection, was published in 1920, its lengthy title poem responding to the desolation of the First World War in its meditations on more viable modes of existence. For some years after he ceased publishing poetry, Flint continued to contribute influential articles to the Times Literary Supplement and The Criterion. He was also a prolific translator of prose works and poetry by French, German, and classical authors.

With the exception of some short works arising from his activities as a civil servant, he ceased writing for publication entirely in the early 1930s.

== Poetry ==
- In the Net of the Stars , BiblioBazaar (Jun 2009) ISBN 978-1-110-85842-2
- Cadences, Poetry Bookshop. London, 1915
- Otherworld: Cadences, Poetry Bookshop, 1920

== Translations ==
- Catt, Henri de Frederick the Great : The Memoirs of his Reader (1758–1760), Constable, London 1916
- Verhaeren, Emile The Love Poems of Emile Verhaeren, Houghton Mifflin, Boston 1916
- Bosscher, Jean de The Closed Door, John Lane, London 1917

== Essays etc ==
- 'Contemporary French Poetry', article in The Poetry Review, August 1912
- 'Some Modern French Poets (A Commentary with a Specimen)' The Chapbook: A Monthly Miscellany , London October 1919
- 'The Younger French Poets' The Chapbook; A Monthly Miscellany , London November 1920
- 'The History of Imagism', essay in The Egoist, May 1915
- 'The Poetry of HD' essay in The Egoist, May 1915
- 'Six French Poets' essay in The Egoist, January 1916
- 'Imagisme', Poetry Chicago March 1913
