= Ezra Pound's Three Kinds of Poetry =

Categorization of poetry

Ezra Pound distinguished three aspects of poetry: melopoeia, phanopoeia, and logopoeia.

== Melopoeia ==
Melopoeia or melopeia is when a word is "charged" beyond its normal meaning with some musical property which further directs its meaning, inducing emotional correlations by sound and rhythm of the speech.

Melopoeia can be "appreciated by a foreigner with a sensitive ear" but does not translate well, according to Pound.

== Phanopoeia ==
Phanopoeia or phanopeia is defined as "a casting of images upon the visual imagination", throwing the object (fixed or moving) on to the visual imagination. In the first publication of these three types, Pound refers to phanopoeia as "imagism".

Phanopoeia can be translated without much difficulty, according to Pound.

== Logopoeia ==
Logopoeia or logopeia is defined by Pound as poetry that uses words for more than just their direct meaning, stimulating the visual imagination with phanopoeia and inducing emotional correlations with melopoeia.

Pound was said to have coined the word from Greek roots in a 1918 review of the "Others" poetry anthology — he defined the term as "the dance of the intellect among words." Elsewhere he changes intellect to intelligence. In the New York Herald Tribune of 20 January 1929, he gave a less opaque definition: poetry which "employs words not only for their direct meaning, but [...] takes count in a special way of habits of usage, of the context we expect to find with the word". But, while this may represent the origin of the term's usage in modern English, the word "logopoeia" itself was not coined by Pound; it already existed in classical Greek.

Logopoeia is the most recent kind of poetry and does not translate well, according to Pound, though he also claimed it was abundant in the poetry of Sextus Propertius (c.50BC-15BC).
