= Mayor of Ridgefield, New Jersey =

Political office in the United States

Mayor of Ridgefield, New Jersey

- Anthony R. Suarez 2004 to 2023. He was arrested in Operation Bid Rig and later acquitted.
- Alexander Shaler (1827–1911) 1899 to 1901.
- W. B. Pugh circa 1895 for two terms, he was the first mayor.
