= The Ridgefield Gazook =

1915 newsletter by Man Ray

The Ridgefield Gazook was a 4-page newsletter written and illustrated by the artist Man Ray. It only appeared for a single issue, (numbered 0), dated 31 March 1915. Ray lived in an artists colony in Ridgefield, New Jersey.

The only copy has been lost. Ray's biographer Arturo Schwarz described the Ridgefield Gazook as "America's first proto-Dada periodical".
