= Ridgefield School District =

Ridgefield School District may refer to:

- Ridgefield School District (Connecticut)
- Ridgefield School District (New Jersey)
- Ridgefield School District (Washington)
