= Ira Nelson Hollis =

American academic administrator (1856–1930)

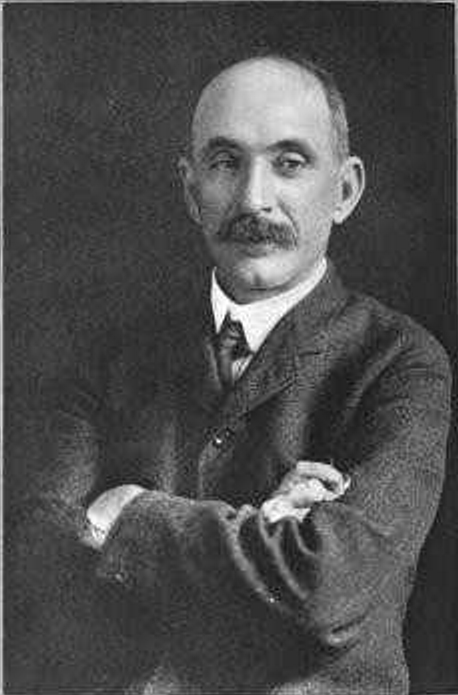
- Born: March 7, 1856; Mooresville, Indiana
- Died: August 15, 1930 (aged 74); Cambridge, Massachusetts
- Burial place: Mount Auburn Cemetery
- Education: United States Naval Academy, B.S. (1878); University of Pittsburgh, Sc.D. (1912)

5th president of Worcester Polytechnic Institute
- In office 1913–1925
- Preceded by: Edmund A. Engler
- Succeeded by: Ralph Earle

36th president of the American Society of Mechanical Engineers
- In office 1917–1918
- Preceded by: David Schenk Jacobus
- Succeeded by: Charles Thomas Main

Ira Nelson Hollis (March 7, 1856 – August 25, 1930) was an American mechanical engineer for the U.S. Navy, Professor of engineering at Harvard University, and 5th president of Worcester Polytechnic Institute. He served as president of the American Society of Mechanical Engineers in the years 1917–18.

== Biography ==
=== Youth, education and early naval career ===
Hollis was born at Mooresville, Indiana as son of Ephriam Joseph Hollis, captain in the 59th Indiana Infantry Regiment, and Mary Kearns Hollis. He was raised in Louisville, where he attended the local high school. After graduation he was an apprentice in a machine shop and later a clerk with a railroad and a cotton commission house.

In 1874 Hollis was admitted to the Naval Academy in Annapolis, now United States Naval Academy, at the age of eighteen at the head of the list. He graduated with honors as Cadet-Engineer in 1878 as top of his class.

After graduation Hollis served in the Navy for fifteen years at sea and on shore. The first three years he spend on the USS Quinnebaug, cruising the North Sea, Mediterranean, and coast of Africa. Subsequently, he was professor of marine engineering at Union College in Schenectady, New York, advisor in the Squadron of Evolution, supervisor at Union Iron Works, back at sea in charge of machinery of a vessel on the China Station, and lecturer at the Naval War College at Newport, Rhode Island.

=== Later career ===
After resigning from the Navy, from 1893 to 1913 Hollis was professor of engineering at Harvard University, at the Lawrence Scientific School. From 1913 to 1925 he served as president of Worcester Polytechnic Institute.

In 1899 Harvard University had granted Hollis an honorary Master of Arts. In the same year he also obtained a Doctor of Humane Letters from Union College. He was elected Fellow of the American Academy of Arts and Sciences, and president of the American Society of Mechanical Engineers in the years 1917–18. In 1912 he obtained a Doctor of Science from the University of Pittsburgh. In 1928, the American Society of Mechanical Engineers elected him an honorary member.

== Selected publications ==
- Ira Nelson Hollis, The frigate Constitution; the central figure of the Navy under sail, 1900.

Articles, a selection

- Hollis, Ira Nelson. "A New Organization for the New Navy." Atlantic Monthly, LXXX (1897), 318–319.
- Hollis, Ira Nelson. "The Navy and the War with Spain." Atlantic Monthly 82 (1898): 605–10.
- Hollis, Ira Nelson. "The Uncertain Factors In Naval Conflicts." Atlantic Monthly, June 728 (1898).
- Hollis, Ira Nelson. "Origin of the Harvard Stadium," Harvard Engineering Journal, 1904.
