= Ridgefield station =

Ridgefield station can refer to:

- Ridgefield station (Erie Railroad)
- Ridgefield station (Hudson–Bergen Light Rail)
- Ridgefield station (New York, New Haven, and Hartford Railroad)
- Ridgefield station (Illinois)
