= Anthony R. Suarez =

American lawyer (born 1967)

Anthony R. Suarez (born 1967) is a New Jersey attorney who served as Mayor of Ridgefield, New Jersey from 2004 to 2023. He was appointed to a judgeship on the New Jersey Superior Court in 2023.

== Biography ==
Suarez was born in Englewood, New Jersey, and was raised in nearby Ridgefield. He graduated from Ridgefield Memorial High School in 1984. He then attended Saint Peter's College in Jersey City, graduating with a B.A. degree in 1988. He received a J.D. degree from Fordham University School of Law in 1993.

He was admitted to the New Jersey Bar in 1993 and the New York Bar in 1994. He has been an attorney at the Fort Lee law firm Dario Yacker Suarez & Albert.

Suarez was elected to the Ridgefield Borough Council in 1998, and was reelected to the Council in 2001. He was elected mayor in 2003 and was reelected in 2007. He is the first elected Latino mayor in the history of Bergen County and the second Democratic mayor in the history of Ridgefield.

== Operation Bid Rig ==
On July 23, 2009, Suarez was arrested as part of Operation Bid Rig, a joint operation of the FBI, IRS, and the U.S. Attorney's Office for the District of New Jersey into political corruption and money laundering. Suarez was charged with accepting a $10,000 cash bribe from an FBI informant through a middleman, Vincent Tabbachino, for assistance in arranging approvals to develop properties in Ridgefield.

Though the two other mayors implicated in the sting operation, Peter Cammarano of Hoboken and Dennis Elwell of Secaucus, resigned following their arrests, Suarez rebuffed calls for his resignation, including from Governor Jon Corzine. On August 3, 2009, Corzine launched an investigation into whether the State of New Jersey should seize control of Ridgefield's finances. Targeting Ridgefield, Corzine also signed an Executive Order freezing development approvals in municipalities with chief executives facing corruption charges who have not resigned from office.

Suarez was acquitted on all charges on October 27, 2010.

== Judicial appointment ==
In 2023, Governor Phil Murphy appointed Suarez to become a judge of the New Jersey Superior Court. David Wildstein of the New Jersey Globe called Suarez's nomination "a complete and total vindication of the Ridgefield mayor" following Operation Bid Rig. Following his New Jersey Senate confirmation, Judge Suarez was assigned to the Bergen County Superior Court, Civil Division.
