= Al Vandeweghe =

American football player (1920–2014)

No. 53
- Position: End

Personal information
- Born: October 25, 1920; Wyckoff, New Jersey, U.S.
- Died: February 2, 2014 (aged 93); Midlothian, Virginia, U.S.
- Listed height: 5 ft 11 in (1.80 m)
- Listed weight: 200 lb (91 kg)

Career information
- High school: Ridgefield Memorial (Ridgefield, New Jersey); Hampton (Hampton, Virginia)
- College: William & Mary
- NFL draft: 1946: 10th round, 88th overall pick

Career history
- Philadelphia Eagles (1946)*; Buffalo Bisons (1946)
- * Offseason or practice squad member only

Career AAFC statistics
- Receptions: 6
- Receiving yards: 67
- Receiving touchdowns: 1
- Stats at Pro Football Reference

Alfred Bernard Vandeweghe (October 25, 1920 – February 2, 2014) was an American professional football player for the All-America Football Conference's Buffalo Bisons after his collegiate career at William & Mary. He later coached at his alma mater from 1947 through 1949.

== Early life, education and military service ==
Originally from Wyckoff, New Jersey, Vandeweghe grew up in Ridgefield Park, New Jersey, where he played at Ridgefield Memorial High School for his first three years of high school, before moving to Hampton, Virginia, and transferring for his senior year to Hampton High School in Virginia, where he played basketball and football, graduating in 1939. He graduated from the College of William & Mary in 1943, where he played football and was co-captain of the basketball team.

He served in the United States Navy at the United States Naval Training Center Bainbridge, where he played football for the Bainbridge Commodores and earned Mid-Atlantic All-Service honors. He also played football on the Fleet City Blue Jackets at Camp Shoemaker, California, where the team went 8–0–1 in 1945.

== Professional and coaching career ==
He played in five games for All-America Football Conference's Buffalo Bisons in the 1946 season.

Then a resident of Teaneck, New Jersey, he was hired in 1947 as an assistant on the coaching staff of the William & Mary Tribe football team, serving until 1949.
