= 65th New York Infantry Regiment =

- Active: July 1861 to July 17, 1865
- Country: United States
- Allegiance: Union
- Branch: Infantry
- Engagements: American Civil War: Siege of Yorktown; Battle of Williamsburg; Battle of Seven Pines; Seven Days Battles; Battle of Malvern Hill; Battle of Antietam; Battle of Fredericksburg; Battle of Salem Heights; Battle of Chancellorsville; Battle of Gettysburg; Bristoe Campaign; Mine Run Campaign; Battle of the Wilderness; Battle of Spotsylvania Court House; Battle of Cold Harbor; Siege of Petersburg; Second Battle of Petersburg; Battle of Jerusalem Plank Road; Battle of Fort Stevens; Third Battle of Winchester; Battle of Fisher's Hill; Battle of Cedar Creek; Appomattox Campaign; Third Battle of Petersburg; Battle of Sailor's Creek; Battle of Appomattox Court House

Commanders
- Colonel: John Cochrane
- Colonel: Alexander Shaler
- Colonel: Joseph E. Hamblin
- Colonel: Henry C. Fiske

Insignia
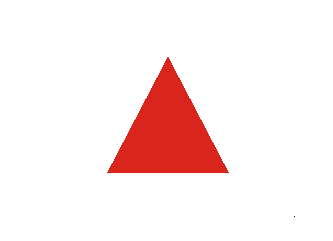
- 1st Division, IV Corps

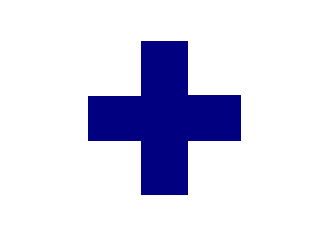
- 3rd Division, VI Corps

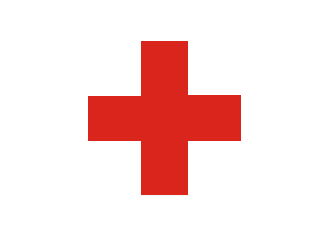
- 1st Division, VI Corps

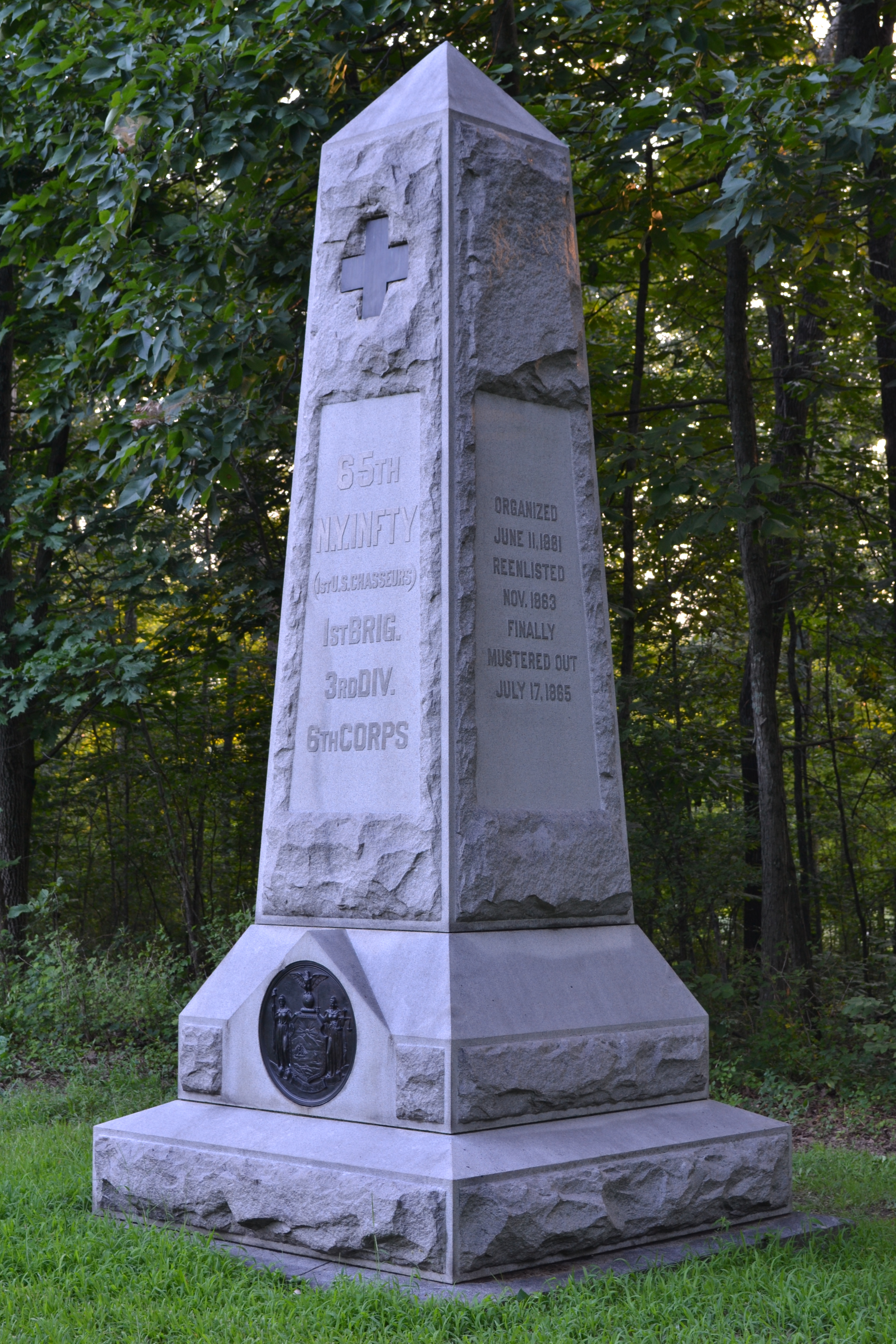
Monument to the 65th New York Volunteer Infantry at Gettysburg

The 65th New York Infantry Regiment (or 1st United States Chasseurs or 1st Grenadier Regiment) was an infantry regiment in the Union Army during the American Civil War. The regiment wore distinctive chasseur styled uniforms. Its members were recruited primarily from New York, but included recruits from Connecticut, Rhode Island, and Ohio.

== Organization ==
The 65th New York Infantry was organized at the Fort at Willets Point, New York and mustered in for three years service beginning in July 1861 under the command of Colonel John Cochrane.

The regiment was attached to Defenses of Washington to October 1861. Graham's Brigade, Buell's Division, Army of the Potomac, to March 1862. 2nd Brigade, 1st Division, IV Corps, Army of the Potomac, to July 1862. 3rd Brigade, 1st Division, IV Corps, to September 1862. 2nd Brigade, 3rd Division, VI Corps, to October 1862. 1st Brigade, 3rd Division, VI Corps, to April, 1864. 4th Brigade, 1st Division, VI Corps, to June 1864. 2nd Brigade, 1st Division, VI Corps, Army of the Potomac, and Army of the Shenandoah, to July 1865.

== Service ==
The regiment left New York for Washington, D.C., on August 27, 1861. Duty in the defenses of Washington, D.C., until March 1862. Reconnaissance to Lewinsville October 10–11, 1861. Marched to Prospect Hill, Va., March 10–15, 1862. Ordered to the Peninsula March 25. Siege of Yorktown April 5-May 4. Battle of Williamsburg May 5. Chickahominy River May 21–22. Battle of Seven Pines or Fair Oaks May 31-June 1. Seven Days before Richmond June 25-July 1. Malvern Hill July 1. Duty at Harrison's Landing until August 16. Movement to Alexandria August 16-September 1. Maryland Campaign September 6–22. Battle of Antietam, September 16–17. Duty in Maryland until October 20. Movement to Stafford Court House, Va., October 20-November 18, and to Belle Plains December 5. Battle of Fredericksburg, December 12–15. At Falmouth until April 27. "Mud March" January 20–24, 1863. Chancellorsville Campaign April 27-May 6. Operations about Franklin's Crossing April 29-May 2. Battle of Maryes Heights, Fredericksburg, May 3. Salem Heights May 3–4. Banks' Ford May 4. Battle of Gettysburg, July 2–4. Pursuit of Lee to Manassas Gap, Va., July 5–24. Duty on line of the Rappahannock until October. Bristoe Campaign October 9–22. Advance to line of the Rappahannock November 7–8. Rappahannock Station November 7. Mine Run Campaign November 26-December 2. Duty at Brandy Station until January 1864, and at Johnson's Island, Lake Erie, Ohio, until March. Campaign from the Rapidan to the James May 3-June 15. Battles of the Wilderness May 5–7. Spotsylvania May 8–12. Spotsylvania Court House May 12–21. "Bloody Angle" May 12. North Anna River May 23–26. On line of the Pamunkey May 26–28. Totopotomoy May 28–31. Cold Harbor June 1–12. Before Petersburg June 17–18. Siege of Petersburg June 17-July 9. Jerusalem Plank Road, Hatcher's Run, June 22–23. Moved to Washington, D.C., July 9–11. Repulse of Early's attack on Fort Stevens and the northern defenses of Washington July 11–12. Sheridan's Shenandoah Valley Campaign August 6-November 28. Battle of Opequan, Winchester, September 19. Fisher's Hill September 22. Battle of Cedar Creek October 19. Duty in the Shenandoah Valley until December. Moved to Petersburg, Va., December 9–12. Siege of Petersburg December 12, 1864 to April 2, 1865. Dabney's Mills, Hatcher's Run, February 5–7, 1865. Appomattox Campaign March 28-April 9. Assault on and fall of Petersburg April 2. Pursuit of Lee April 3–9. Sailor's Creek April 6. Appomattox Court House April 9. Surrender of Lee and his army. At Farmville and Burkesville until April 23. March to Danville April 23–27, and duty there until May 24. Marched to Richmond, Va., then to Washington, D.C., May 24-June 3. Corps Review June 8.

The 65th New York Infantry mustered out of service July 17, 1865.

The regiment lost a total of 206 men during service; 5 officers and 112 enlisted men killed or mortally wounded, 1 officer and 88 enlisted men died of disease.

== Uniform ==
The regiment's wore a distinctive short chasseur jacket with extensive sky blue trim. They wore gray wool militia trousers over gray canvas gaiters. They wore the Hardee hat.

== Commanders ==
- Colonel John Cochrane
- Colonel Alexander Shaler
- Colonel Joseph E. Hamblin
- Lieutenant Colonel William Higginbotham
- Colonel Henry C. Fiske

== Notable members ==
- Charles L. Hodges, who enlisted as a private in 1861 when he was 14, and attained the rank of regimental sergeant major. He remained in the army, and retired as a major general in 1911.

== See also ==
- List of New York Civil War regiments
- New York in the Civil War
