= Grantwood, New Jersey =

Populated place in Bergen County, New Jersey, US

- Community
- Location of Grantwood in Bergen County in New Jersey Grantwood (New Jersey) Grantwood (the United States)
- Coordinates: 40°49′36″N 73°59′13″W
- Country: United States
- State: New Jersey
- County: Bergen
- Boroughs: Cliffside Park, Ridgefield
- Elevation: 269 ft (82 m)
- Area codes: 201/551
- GNIS feature ID: 876712

Grantwood is an unincorporated community straddling the boroughs of Cliffside Park and Ridgefield, just south of Fort Lee, in eastern Bergen County, New Jersey, United States.

== Toponymy ==
Grantwood Heights Land Company was incorporated on February 16, 1900 by Frank Knox. He bought land in the area, including what would later become Palisades Amusement Park. Grantwood was so dubbed in the beginning of the 20th century and takes its name from its location on the Hudson Palisades across the Hudson River from Grant's Tomb (40.813333°N 73.963056°W) in Manhattan, New York City which was reached by 130th Street Ferry at Edgewater.

== Artists' colony ==
Grantwood was an artist's colony established in 1913 by Man Ray and Samuel Halpert, and became the artistic center for a collective known as the "Others" group of artists. The colony consisted of a number of clapboard shacks on a bluff. Some names of the streets in this part of Ridgefield Heights — Sketch Place, Studio Road, and Art Lane — pay homage to Grantwood's history. The first issue of The Glebe, a literary magazine, was published at the colony in 1913. In 1915, Alfred Kreymborg launched Others: A Magazine of the New Verse with Skipwith Cannell, Wallace Stevens, and William Carlos Williams. Along with works of the founders it published work of Maxwell Bodenheim, Mina Loy, Marianne Moore, Ezra Pound, Carl Sandburg, and Orrick Johns among others. Walter Conrad Arensberg was influential in supporting the colony.

== Motion picture industry ==
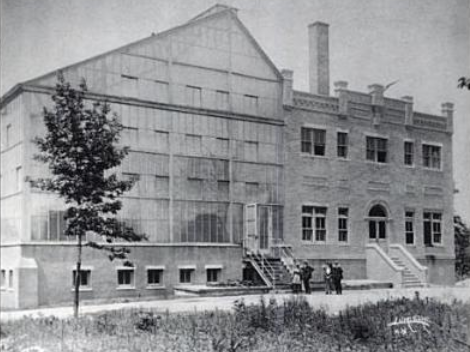
Movie studio-lab opened in 1915

The history of cinema in the United States can trace its roots to the East Coast where, at one time, Fort Lee, just north of Grantwood, was the motion picture capital of America.

The E.K.Lincoln Studio was built in 1915 in Grantwood on Bergen Boulevard and was owned and operated by E.K. Lincoln, who was both an actor and movie maker. Many in the early film world worked out of this studio and used various spots in the area for location work. The first production was The Fighting Chance in which Lincoln starred alongside Violet Horner (who also starred in The Girl from Alaska). Between 1916 and 1917, the studio was rented by Fox Film. In 1920 the United States Photoplay Corporation used it for the film Determination. In 1923, Peter Jones produced the film How High Is Up?. According to Film Daily (June 1926), the first episode of The Leather Pushers (1922) with Reginald Denny was filmed there. After World War I, many movie makers, including Lincoln, headed out to Hollywood where the climate enable them to film outdoors all year round. After talkies came into being in 1927, the studio continued to be used to make Italian and Polish language films. By the end of the Depression, the studio was no longer for film production. The building burnt down the 1960s.

== See also ==
- Morsemere, New Jersey
- North Hudson County Railway
- Mount Moriah Cemetery (Fairview, New Jersey)
- Helicon Home Colony
