= Joseph Eldridge Hamblin =

American Civil War officer

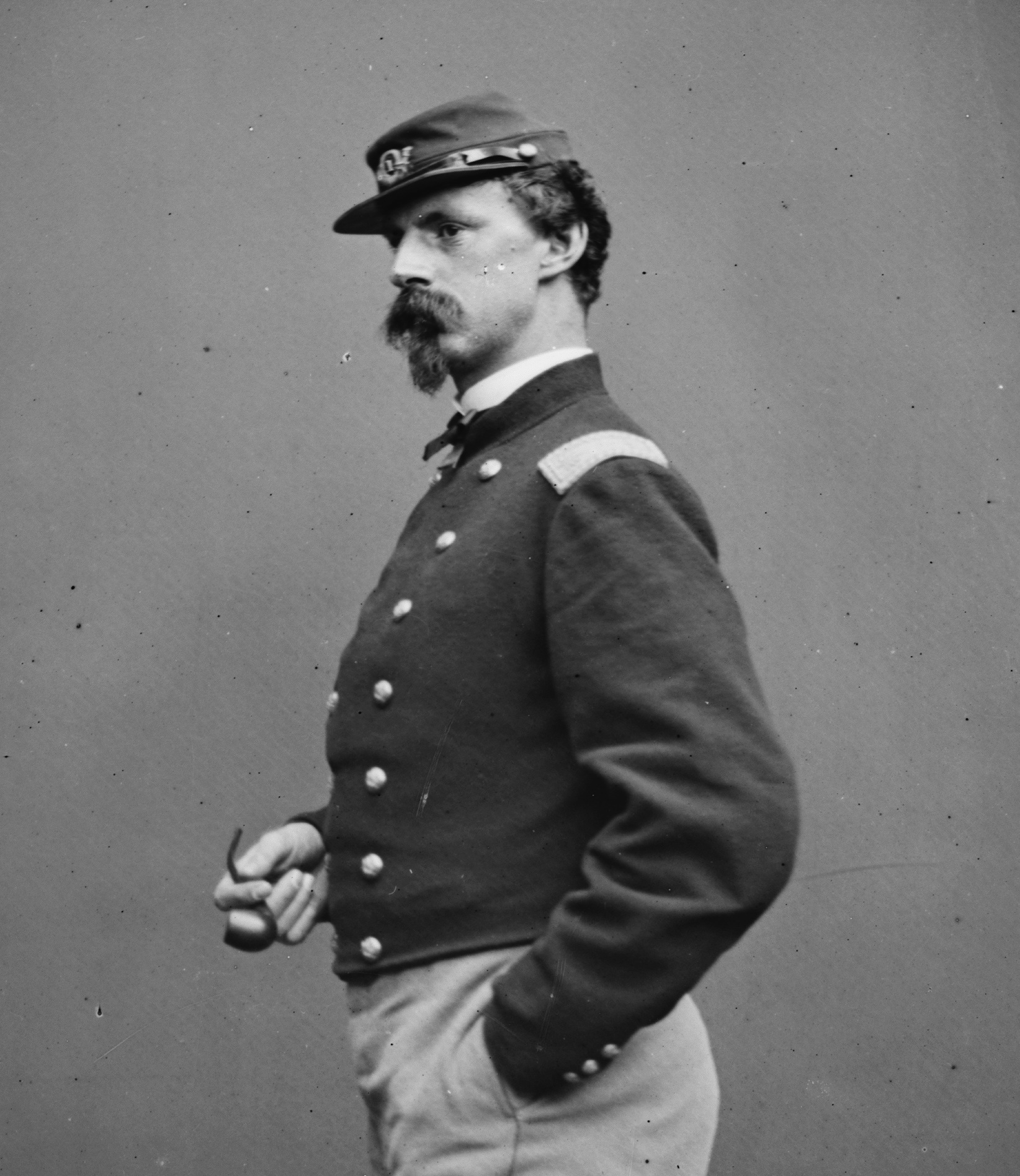
- Born: January 13, 1828; Yarmouth, Massachusetts
- Died: July 3, 1870 (aged 41–42)
- Burial place: Woodside Cemetery, Yarmouth Port, Massachusetts
- Military career
- Allegiance: United States of America; Union
- Branch: United States Army; Union Army
- Service years: 1861–1865
- Rank: Colonel; Brevet Major General
- Unit: 5th New York Infantry
- Commands: 65th New York Infantry
- Conflicts: American Civil War
- Other work: insurance broker

Joseph Eldridge Hamblin (January 13, 1828 – July 3, 1870) was an American officer during the Civil War, who led a regiment and then a brigade in the Army of the Potomac.

== Biography ==
Hamblin, the son of Benjamin and Hannah (Sears) Hamblin, was born January 13, 1828, at Yarmouth, Massachusetts. He was an insurance broker at the outbreak of the war. Long a member of the 7th New York Volunteer Infantry Regiment, then the 7th Regiment of the New York militia, he enlisted in 1861 as adjutant in Duryea's Zouaves and served in Northern Virginia under Butler, McClellan, Meade, and Grant, and Sheridan in the 65th New York Infantry.

When Colonel Alexander Shaler became a general, Hamblin became regimental colonel in his place. He especially distinguished himself at the Battle of Cedar Creek, where he was wounded while leading a brigade of VI Corps. Hamblin was brevetted as a brigadier general and in 1865 promoted to full rank, with the brevet of major general for gallantry at Battle of Sailor's Creek.

After the war he was prominent in the New York National Guard and resumed work in the insurance business.

== See also ==
- List of American Civil War generals (Union)
