= Ridgefield Memorial High School =

High school in Bergen County, New Jersey, US

Location
- 555 Walnut Avenue; Ridgefield, Bergen County, New Jersey 07657; United States; 40°49′53″N 73°59′58″W

Information
- Type: Public high school
- Established: 1958
- School district: Ridgefield School District
- NCES School ID: 341377000742
- Principal: Joseph Romeo
- Faculty: 45.3 FTEs
- Grades: 9–12
- Enrollment: 512 (as of 2024–25)
- Student to teacher ratio: 11.3:1
- Colors: Royal blue and white
- Athletics conference: North Jersey Interscholastic Conference
- Team name: Royals
- Rivals: Palisades Park High School
- Publication: Serendipity (literary magazine)
- Newspaper: The Crown
- Yearbook: Epilogue
- Website: rmhs.ridgefieldschools.com

Ridgefield Memorial High School is a comprehensive community four-year public high school located in Ridgefield, in Bergen County, in the U.S. state of New Jersey, serving students in ninth through twelfth grades as the lone secondary school of the Ridgefield School District.

As of the 2024–25 school year, the school had an enrollment of 512 students and 45.3 classroom teachers (on an FTE basis), for a student–teacher ratio of 11.3:1. There were 193 students (37.7% of enrollment) eligible for free lunch and 46 (9.0% of students) eligible for reduced-cost lunch.

== History ==
Until the school opened, students from Ridgefield had been sent to Cliffside Park High School as part of a sending/receiving relationship.

Nearly $1.9 million (equivalent to $21.6 million in 2025) was allocated for construction of the high school, which would include 28 classrooms and other facilities.

The dedication of the school in September 1958 was celebrated with a parade.

== Awards, recognition and rankings ==
The school was the 176th-ranked public high school in New Jersey out of 339 schools statewide in New Jersey Monthly magazine's September 2014 cover story on the state's "Top Public High Schools", using a new ranking methodology. The school had been ranked 96th in the state of 328 schools in 2012, after being ranked 112th in 2010 out of 322 schools listed. The magazine ranked the school 135th in 2008 out of 316 schools. The school was ranked 97th in the magazine's September 2006 issue, which surveyed 316 schools across the state. Schooldigger.com ranked the school 127th out of 381 public high schools statewide in its 2011 rankings (an increase of 130 positions from the 2010 ranking) which were based on the combined percentage of students classified as proficient or above proficient on the mathematics (86.3%) and language arts literacy (93.8%) components of the High School Proficiency Assessment (HSPA).

== Extracurricular activities ==
The school's publications are The Crown monthly newspaper, the Serendipity literary and arts magazine and Epilogue yearbook.

The Marching Royals Marching Band participates annually in the NCAA Men's college basketball tournament "Coaches vs. Cancer" at Madison Square Garden and at the NCAA Men's college basketball tournament "Legends Classic" at the IZOD center in the Meadowlands sports complex. The band has performed for Michael Jordan's basketball classic (also held at Madison Square Garden). In 2009, the Marching Royals were the Grand National Marching champion at the Orlando All-star music festival.

The Academic Decathlon team has consistently gone to the state competition for the past 14 years, and has received awards and medals, including in the 2002–03 season, which saw them represent New Jersey in the National Finals in Phoenix, Arizona.

== Athletics ==
The Ridgefield Memorial High School Royals participate in the North Jersey Interscholastic Conference, which is comprised of small-enrollment schools in Bergen, Hudson, Morris and Passaic counties, and was created following a reorganization of sports leagues in Northern New Jersey by the New Jersey State Interscholastic Athletic Association (NJSIAA). Prior to the realignment that took effect in 2010, Ridgefield was a member of the Bergen County Scholastic League (BCSL). With 387 students in grades 10-12, the school was classified by the NJSIAA for the 2019–20 school year as Group I for most athletic competition purposes, which included schools with an enrollment of 75 to 476 students in that grade range. The school's co-op team with Cliffside Park High School was classified by the NJSIAA as Group V North for football for 2024–2026, which included schools with 1,317 to 5,409 students.

The school has 22 varsity sports programs. Interscholastic sports offered at the school include:

- Fall: Cross Country (boys/girls), Cheerleading, Soccer (boys/girls), Tennis (girls), Volleyball
- Winter: Basketball (boys/girls), Indoor Track (boys/girls), Competition Cheer Leading
- Spring: Baseball, Softball, Outdoor Track (boys/girls), Tennis (boys), Golf (boys/girls)

The football, soccer and track events are all held at Willis Field.

The Royals golf team won five consecutive league titles from 2006 to 2010. The Royals boys' cross country team also won a league title during the 2009 fall season.

The baseball team won the North II Group I state sectional championships in 2012 with a 6-4 win against Dunellen High School. The team won the North I, Group I title in 2014 with a 2-1 win against Cedar Grove High School in the tournament final.

For the 2015 season, the school fielded only a JV football team, after only 13 players participated in a fall football camp. The school forfeited all of its varsity games, repeating what was done in the 2011 season after the team had lost its first three games. The future of the varsity football program is unclear, but the NJSIAA offers schools the option of creating a co-op program with another school.

== Administration ==
The school's principal and athletic director is Joseph Romeo. His administration includes the assistant principal and the supervisor of instruction.

== Notable alumni ==
- Tim Bogert (1944–2021, class of 1963), musician
- Louise DeSalvo (1942–2018, class of 1959), writer, editor, professor, and lecturer who was a renowned Virginia Woolf scholar
- Joseph Lagana (born 1978), politician who has represented the 38th Legislative District in the New Jersey Senate since 2018
- Chris Lema (born 1995), footballer who played as a midfielder for San Antonio FC
- Anthony R. Suarez (born 1967), Mayor of Ridgefield since 2004
- Al Vandeweghe (1920–2014), professional football player for the All-America Football Conference's Buffalo Bisons in 1946
