= Lori Serrano =

Lori Serrano is the former Commissioner and Chairwoman of the Jersey City Housing Authority, the state's second largest public housing authority. She was an unsuccessful City Council candidate on mayoral candidate Louis Manzo's ticket in the 2009 Jersey City municipal election.

== Biography ==
In October 2008, Serrano was removed by state authorities from the Housing Authority for failure to complete the required training for public housing commissioners.

In July 2009, Serrano was arrested by the FBI as part of a major corruption and international money laundering conspiracy probe labeled Operation Bid Rig. Serrano was charged by the U.S. Attorney's Office for the District of New Jersey with conspiracy to commit extortion under color of official right. Serrano allegedly accepted $10,000 in cash from an FBI cooperating witness posing as a developer in exchange for promising political favors. She was sentenced to 18 months probation.

Serrano had attended St. Mary High School and Monmouth University. Prior to her arrest on federal corruption charges as part of Operation Bid Rig, she worked as a payroll clerk for the Jersey City Public Schools.
