= Morsemere, New Jersey =

Populated place in Bergen County, New Jersey, US

- Unincorporated community
- Location of Morsemere in Bergen County Inset: Location of county within the state of New Jersey Morsemere, New Jersey (New Jersey) Morsemere, New Jersey (the United States)
- Coordinates: 40°50′34″N 74°00′17″W
- Country: United States
- State: New Jersey
- County: Bergen
- Borough: Palisades Park and Ridgefield
- Elevation: 33 ft (10 m)
- Time zone: UTC−05:00 (Eastern (EST))
  - Summer (DST): UTC−04:00 (EDT)
- GNIS feature ID: 878502

Morsemere
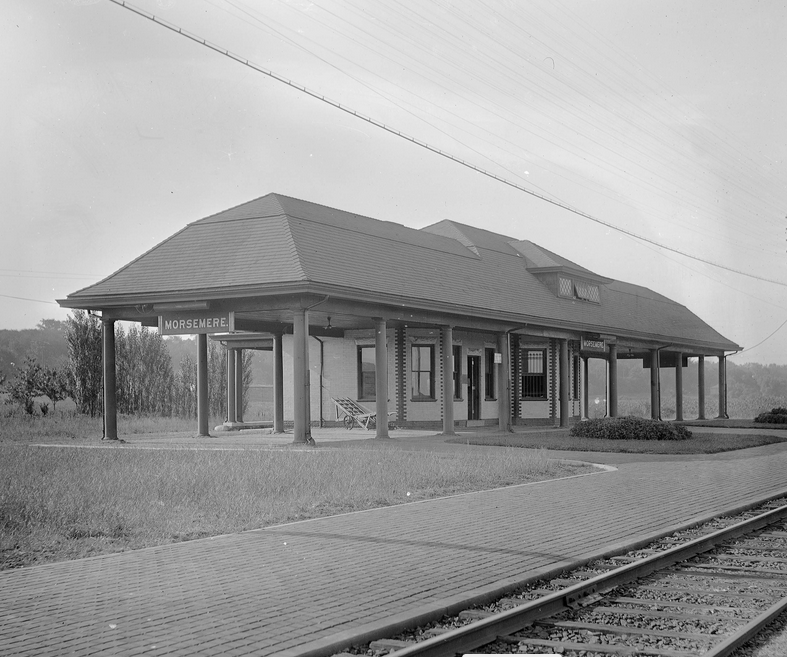

General information
- Location: Ridgefield, New Jersey
- Owner: Northern Railroad of New Jersey (1859–1942); Erie Railroad (1942–1960); Erie Lackawanna Railway (1960–1976)
- Line: Erie Railroad Northern Branch

Construction
- Platform levels: 1

Other information
- Station code: 1913

History
- Opened: 1870s
- Closed: September 30, 1966
- Rebuilt: 1872

Former services
Preceding station	Erie Railroad	Following station
Palisades Park toward Nyack	Northern Branch	Ridgefield toward Jersey City
Location

Morsemere is a neighborhood in Bergen County, in the U.S. state of New Jersey, largely in the northern part of Ridgefield and straddling the border of Palisades Park south of start of U.S. Route 46.

== History ==
Morsemere is named for Samuel Morse, who had bought property with the intention of building a home there, but died before doing so. His estate was subdivided and laid out from 1899 to 1902. It underwent massive expansion around 1910.

The eponymous Morsemere Church was completed in 1928. The locally founded Morsemere Trust Company was eventually subsumed by MetroCorp Bancshares.

Until the 1950s when dial telephone service arrived, the local exchange was MOrsemere 6.

The Erie Railroad Northern Branch had a station in the neighborhood as well as at Ridgefield. The station house, built when the community was developed, burn down in 1928. It was also accessible by trolley form the 130th Ferry Terminal in Edgewater.

== See also ==
- Grantwood, New Jersey
