= St. Mary High School (Jersey City, New Jersey) =

Catholic high school in Hudson County, New Jersey, US

Location
- 209 3rd Street; Jersey City, Hudson County, New Jersey 07302; United States
- Coordinates: 40.723044°N 74.043756°W

Information
- Type: Private, Coeducational
- Religious affiliation: Roman Catholic
- Established: 1956
- Status: Closed
- Closed: June 2011
- School district: Archdiocese of Newark
- Principal: Beatrice Esteban-Messina
- Faculty: 12.8 (on FTE basis)
- Grades: 9–12
- Student to teacher ratio: 15.9:1
- Athletics conference: Hudson County Interscholastic Athletic Association
- Team name: Ramblers
- Accreditation: Middle States Association of Colleges and Schools
- Website: saintmaryhsjc.org

St. Mary High School was a private, Roman Catholic high school in Jersey City, in the U.S. state of New Jersey, that operated as part of the Roman Catholic Archdiocese of Newark until the school was closed in June 2011.

As of the 2009-10 school year, the school had an enrollment of 203 students and 12.8 classroom teachers (on an FTE basis), for a student–teacher ratio of 15.9.

== Athletics ==
The St. Mary High School Ramblers competed in the Hudson County Interscholastic Athletic Association, which includes public and private high schools in Hudson County, and operated under the supervision of the New Jersey State Interscholastic Athletic Association.

The baseball team has won the Non-Public B state championship in 1981, defeating Saint James High School of Carneys Point Township in the tournament final.

The boys basketball team won the Non-Public B state championship in 1967 (defeating St. Peter the Apostle High School of New Brunswick in the tournament final) and 1969 (vs. Gloucester Catholic High School), and won the Non-Public C title in 1972 (vs. St. Patrick's High School) and 1975 (vs. Sacred Heart High School). The 1975 team finished with a record of 25-4 after holding off a furious rally by Sacred Heart to win the Parochial C title with a 51-50 victory in the championship game played at Brookdale Community College.The 1975 team finished the season with a record of 20-7 after defeating St. Cecilia by a score of 79-41 to win the Parochial B state championship game.

== Closing ==
Despite a tuition that at $4,300 was little more than half of the rates charges by other schools in the Newark Archdiocese, falling enrollment meant that the school would have been too small to justify remaining open. After its founding in 1956, the school grew to a peak of 450 students in the 1980s, which had declined to 381 by 2000. In 2008 Sisters of St. Joseph decided to no longer financially support the school. The 2010-11 graduating class of 72 combined with enrollment of under 15 students for the upcoming school year would have put total enrollment at an unsustainably small 100 students for the 2011-12 year, which led the Archdiocese to decide to close the school.

== Notable alumni ==
- Jim Boylan (born 1955), basketball coach., who served as the interim head coach for the Chicago Bulls for part of the 2007–08 NBA season and as an interim coach for the Milwaukee Bucks for part of the 2012–13 NBA season.
- Lori Serrano, former Commissioner and Chairwoman of the Jersey City Housing Authority.

== Notable faculty ==
- Tony Nicodemo (born 1935), college basketball player who set several records while playing for Saint Michael's College of Vermont in the late 1950s and who was athletic director at St. Mary for 30 years.
