= Alexander Shaler =

Union Army general and Medal of Honor recipient

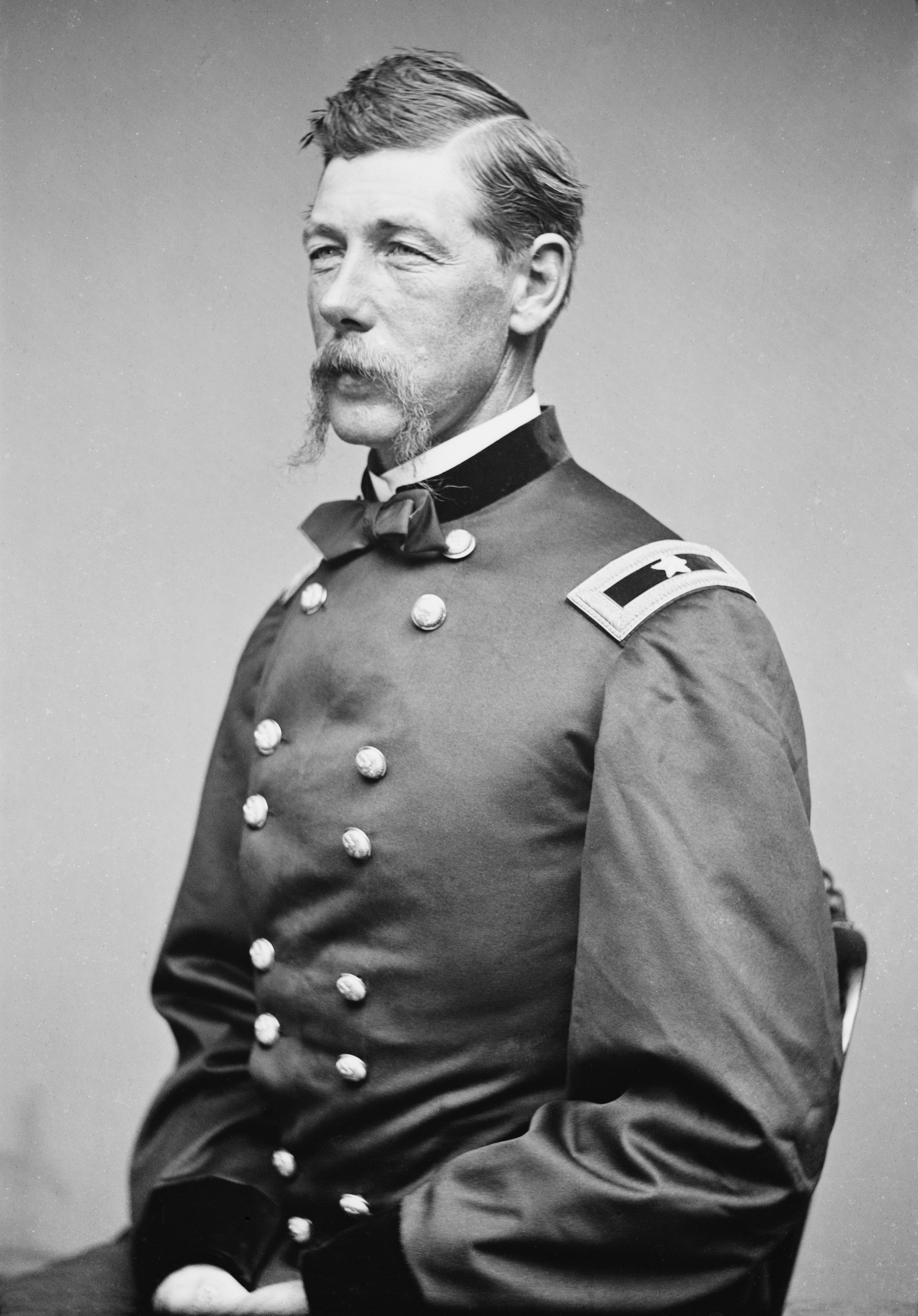
- Alexander Shaler
- Born: March 19, 1827; Haddam, Connecticut
- Died: December 28, 1911 (aged 84); New York City
- Burial place: Ridgefield Cemetery, Ridgefield, New Jersey
- Military career
- Allegiance: United States; Union
- Branch: United States Army; Union Army
- Service years: 1861–1865
- Rank: brigadier general Brevet major general
- Conflicts: American Civil War

Alexander Shaler (March 19, 1827 – December 28, 1911) was a Union Army general in the American Civil War. He received the United States military's highest decoration, the Medal of Honor, for his actions at the Second Battle of Fredericksburg. After the war, he was at various times the head of the New York City Fire Department, president of the National Rifle Association, and Mayor of Ridgefield, New Jersey, from 1899 to 1901.

== Early life ==
Shaler was born in Haddam, Connecticut, on March 19, 1827, son of Ira Shaler, a merchant captain, and Jerusha Arnold. He lived much of his life in New York City beginning at the age of seven. Apparently Shaler had a private income that allowed him to pursue his own interests, and he was educated in private schools. He was active in the New York State militia, beginning as a private in 1848 and becoming major of the 7th New York Militia in 1860. Shaler published a Manual of Arms for Light Infantry, New York : T.B. Harrison & Co., 1861. With the outbreak of the American Civil War in 1861, Shaler's regiment, then called the 7th New York Volunteer Infantry Regiment, was sent to defend Washington, D.C.

== American Civil War: Service in the East ==
After returning to New York City, Shaler became lieutenant colonel of the 65th New York Volunteer Infantry, known as the 1st United States Chasseurs. John Cochrane served as colonel. Shaler was credited by The New York Times with drilling the regiment well. The regiment left for the front on August 27, 1861. They served in the Peninsula Campaign of Major General George McClellan and then in the Maryland Campaign as part of the division of Brigadier General Darius Couch in IV Corps, Army of the Potomac. Shaler became colonel on June 17, 1862, after Cochrane was promoted to the rank of brigadier general. After Antietam, Couch's division became the third division of VI Corps. John Newton succeeded Couch. Shaler's regiment became part of Cochrane's brigade in that division. It was present at the Battle of Fredericksburg but not seriously engaged.

Shaler assumed command of the brigade in March 1863 following the resignation of John Cochrane. He was appointed to the rank of brigadier general, to rank from May 26, 1862, on May 26, 1863. (Joseph Eldridge Hamblin became colonel of the regiment in his place.) Shaler led the brigade at the Second Battle of Fredericksburg, also known as the Second Battle of Marye's Heights, on May 3, when VI Corps, under Major General John Sedgwick drove Jubal Early's division away from the Heights. At a crucial moment, Shaler seized a flag and led his men into the Confederate defenses. In 1893, he received the Medal of Honor for this act. His brigade also participated in the Battle of Salem Church.

In the Battle of Gettysburg, VI Corps served as a reserve for the Army of the Potomac. Shaler's brigade was sent to the right flank early on July 3, 1863. There it helped XII Corps hold Culp's Hill. Shaler's brigade usually was in reserve, but units went to the front line to help in resisting Confederate attacks. About 3:30 that afternoon, Shaler's brigade was sent to the center of the army as a reserve around the time of the repulse of Pickett's Charge.

Shaler commanded the prisoner of war camp at Johnson's Island on the shores of Lake Erie in the winter of 1863–1864, with his regiment serving as prison guards. He was back with his brigade in 1864 in time to participate in the Overland Campaign. VI Corps had been reorganized, and Shaler's brigade served in General Horatio Wright's first division. This brigade was on the army's right flank in the Battle of the Wilderness on May 6, 1864. At first, it was in a "refused" position facing north, thus protecting the rest of the corps. Then it was drawn into the main line of battle, supporting its fight with LG Richard S. Ewell's corps. As a result, Shaler's brigade was flanked by Confederate troops led by Brigadier General John Brown Gordon that had swung northward to attack the Union right flank. Shaler and Brigadier General Truman Seymour were among the Union soldiers captured in his foray. Shaler was trying to rally his men when he was made a captive. He was sent to Libby Prison, in Richmond, Virginia and then to Macon, Georgia. In the summer of 1864 he was placed under the fire of Union batteries bombarding Charleston, South Carolina.

== American Civil War: Service in the West ==
After being exchanged, Shaler was transferred West where he served in the Department of the Gulf, briefly commanding third brigade, second division XIX Corps, from November 3 to December 3, 1864. Then he served in Arkansas, where he led the second division in VII Corps, December 28, 1864 – August 1, 1865, under Major General Joseph J. Reynolds. This division was based in DeValls Bluff in east central Arkansas. It most was engaged in occupation of the region and minor skirmishes with Confederate forces. In June 1865, as the war was ending, Shaler cooperated in the efforts of Major General Grenville Dodge, commanding the Department of Missouri, to parole the irregular forces of Brigadier General M. Jeff Thompson.

Shaler was mustered out of the volunteers on August 24, 1865. On January 12, 1866, President of the United States Andrew Johnson nominated Shaler for appointment to the brevet rank of major general of volunteers, to rank from July 27, 1865, and the United States Senate confirmed the appointment on March 12, 1866.

== Post-war life ==
After the war, Shaler served as commissioner of the New York City Fire Department from 1867 to 1873. He was active in veterans' affairs, including heading the New York Commandery of the Loyal Legion. He also became major general of the state militia in 1867, commanding the first division. His tenure was not always peaceful. One of his officers accused the general of incompetence. Later, in 1885, he was arrested and charged with corruption, especially connected with the choice of sites for armories. Shaler was not convicted in two trials, because in both cases the jury could not reach agreement. Nonetheless, he had to step down from his militia position; and the city removed him from the Board of Health. The general had become chair of the Board of Health in 1883. He also served as President of the Soldiers' Business Messenger and Dispatch Company incorporated in 1867 which helped infirmed vets in good standing and orphans of vets lost during the war find employment as trusted messengers in New York City. Shaler is credited with being a founder of the National Rifle Association, serving as a director and its president in 1876. Shaler served as president of the Automatic Signal Telegraph Company, where his tenure was also stormy. In an altercation with William B. Watkins, the inventor of the fire alarm telegraph system the company marketed, Shaler had Watkins arrested for trying to remove certain papers from the premises of the company. This dispute culminated in a trial. The court ruled on April 15, 1885, that Shaler's charge of fraud against Watkins was unfounded, but the general was able to retain the shares in the company he had received as compensation for his work as president even after the company sold itself to the Watkins Automatic Telegraph Company, run by many of the same people.

Shaler moved to Ridgefield, New Jersey, possibly to escape past disputes, though he also maintained a residence in New York City, at 126 Riverside Drive. He served as Mayor of Ridgefield, New Jersey, from 1899 to 1901. Shaler died at his New York home on December 28, 1911. He was buried in Ridgefield in the cemetery of the Dutch Reformed Church in the English Neighborhood.

His only son, Ira Alexander Shaler, a major in the Spanish-American War, was put in charge of building the first subway tunnel through the Murray Hill neighborhood of Manhattan. Major Shaler died in 1902 at age 39 two weeks after his back was broken when a subway tunnel collapsed on him.

== See also ==
- List of American Civil War generals (Union)
- List of Medal of Honor recipients
- List of American Civil War Medal of Honor recipients: Q–S

National Rifle Association of America
Preceded by William Conant Church	President of the NRA; 1875–1877	Succeeded by N. P. Stanton
