= Ridgefield station (Hudson–Bergen Light Rail) =

Proposed rail station in New Jersey, US

Ridgefield
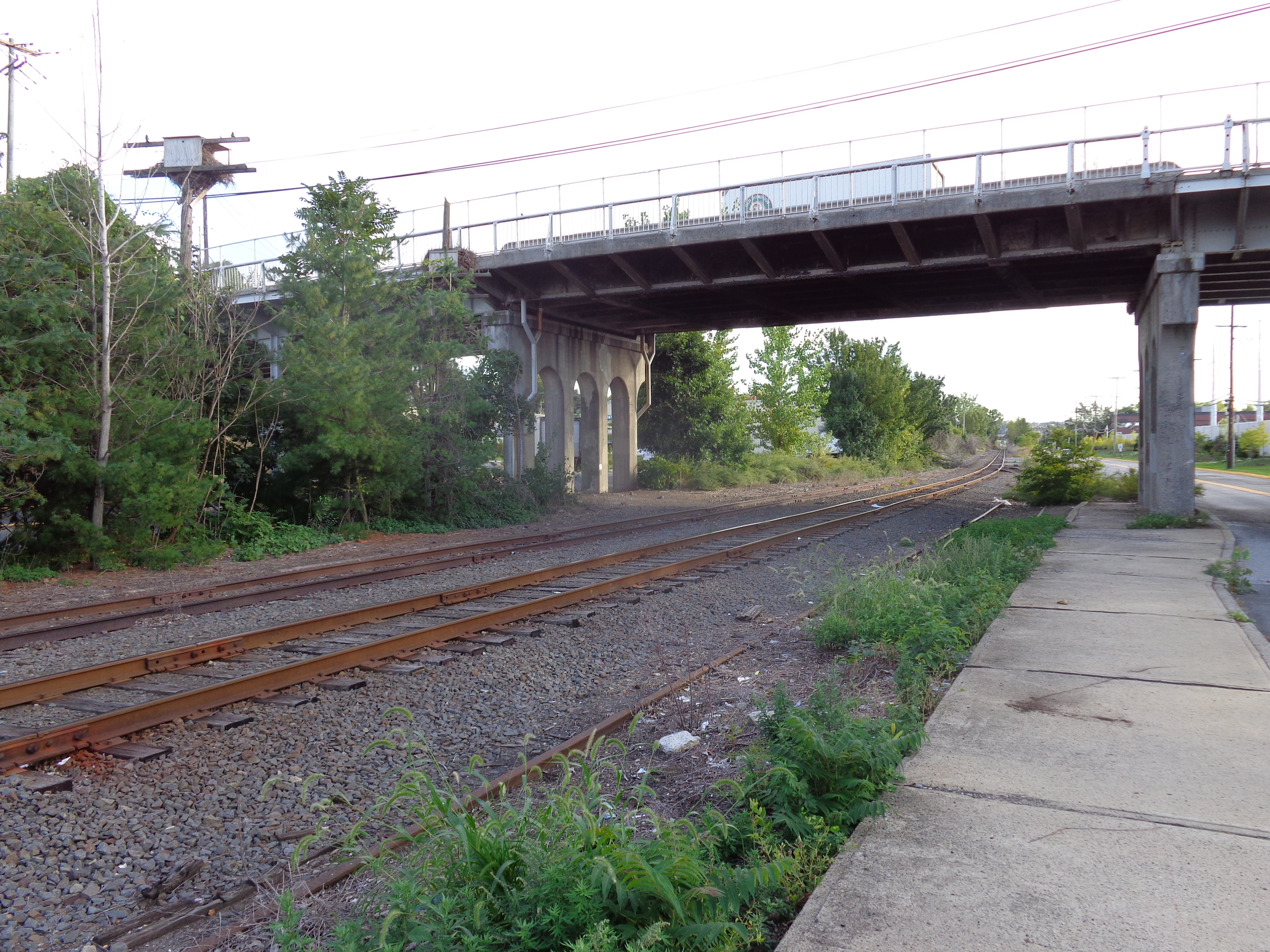
- Hendricks Causeway over the Northern Branch

General information
- Location: Ridgefield, New Jersey
- Coordinates: 40.8328°N 74.0116°W
- Owner: NJT
- Platforms: 2
- Tracks: 2
- Connections: NJ Transit 127, 165

Construction
- Parking: 269

History
- Opened: TBD

Former services
Preceding station	Erie Railroad	Following station
Morsemere toward Nyack	Northern Branch	Fairview toward Jersey City
Proposed services
Preceding station	NJ Transit	Following station
91st Street toward West Side Avenue	West Side–Tonnelle Northern Branch	Palisades Park toward Englewood Hospital
91st Street toward Hoboken	Hoboken–Tonnelle Northern Branch	Palisades Park toward Englewood Hospital
Location

Ridgefield is a proposed station along NJ Transit's (NJT) Northern Branch Corridor Project extension of Hudson-Bergen Light Rail (HBLR) in Ridgefield, New Jersey.

The station site is located along the Northern Branch just west of U.S. Route 1/9 (Broad Avenue) at the overpass of the Hendricks Causeway (County Route S124), southwest of Remson Place. The station is designed to have two side platforms. Parking for 269 vehicles is planned, for which approximately 3 acres will be acquired. As of 2019 NJ Transit bus 127 and 165 stopped in the vicinity of the station on Broad Avenue.

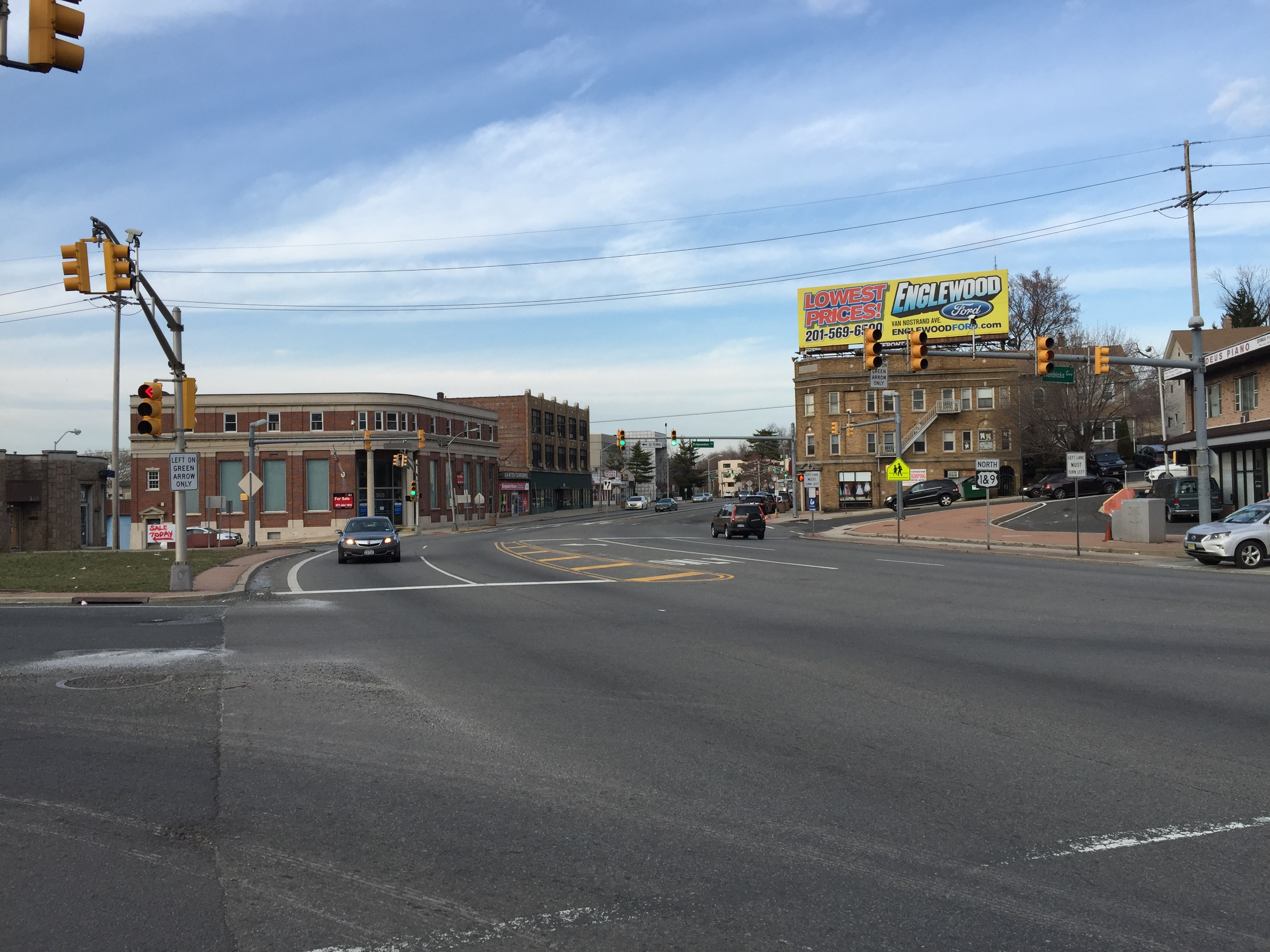
The park and ride and bus transfers will be available from Broad Avenue

.

Rail service in Ridgefield began in 1859 by a subsidiary of the Erie Railroad. while the area was still called the English Neighborhood. The Erie Railroad Ridgefield Freight Station (#1911) was located at Edgewater Avenue nearby Dutch Reformed Church in the English Neighborhood. and was demolished to make way for the creation of Remson Place after Hendricks Causeway was built in the 1930s. The railroad also had a station in the borough at Morsemere.

Early plans and studies from the 1990s for the HBLR system had originally conceived a terminus in Ridgefield at the Vince Lombardi Park & Ride at the New Jersey Turnpike and still under consideration as part of the Passaic–Bergen–Hudson Transit Project.

== See also ==
- Northern Branch (NJ Transit)
