= Operation Bid Rig =

New Jersey political corruption investigation by the Federal Bureau of Investigation

Operation Bid Rig was a long-term investigation into political corruption in New Jersey conducted by the Federal Bureau of Investigation, Internal Revenue Service, and United States Attorney for the District of New Jersey from 2002 to 2014. Public corruption generally means elected or career public officials stealing public property or receiving bribes from businesses and individuals in return for special treatment.

The investigation has resulted in the indictments of more than 60 public officials and politically connected individuals since its inception. In July 2009, sting operations resulted in the arrest of 44 people in New Jersey and New York, including 29 public servants and political operatives and five orthodox rabbis from the Syrian Jewish community. A number of high-level New Jersey elected officials were arrested in the operation, including Jersey City Deputy Mayor Leona Beldini, Hoboken Mayor Peter Cammarano, Secaucus Mayor Dennis Elwell, Ridgefield Mayor Anthony R. Suarez, former Jersey City Housing Authority Commissioner and Chairwoman Lori Serrano, Jersey City Housing Authority Commissioner Edward Cheatam, Assemblyman L. Harvey Smith, Assemblyman Daniel M. Van Pelt, former assemblyman and unsuccessful mayoral candidate Louis Manzo, and political operatives Joseph Cardwell and Jack Shaw. A member of the governor’s cabinet resigned after agents searched his home, though he was not arrested.

== Background ==
Operation Bid Rig originated with investigations of public corruption among New Jersey officials in Monmouth and Ocean counties. The first phase became public in 2002 when former Ocean Township Mayor Terrance D. Weldon pleaded guilty to extorting cash from developers to influence the approval of building projects. The second phase of the investigation resulted in the February 2005 arrests of 11 elected officials in Monmouth County, who were charged with taking bribes from an undercover cooperating witness.

== Operation Bid Rig II ==
The second phase of the investigation was conducted in 2003 and 2004. Robert "Duke" Steffer, a former developer in New Jersey and Florida, solicited public officials for projects for his company, Steffer Industries Inc., which was later found to be a shell created by investigators.

The investigation snared more than 12 public officials including:

- Paul Zambrano, Mayor of West Long Branch, New Jersey
- John Merla, Mayor of Keyport, New Jersey
- Paul Coughlin, Mayor of Hazlet, New Jersey
- Richard Iadanza, Deputy Mayor of Neptune Township, New Jersey
- John Hamilton Jr., Councilman, Asbury Park, NJ
- Joseph DeLisa, Councilman, West Long Branch, New Jersey
- Robert Hyer, Councilman, Keyport, NJ
- Raymond O'Grady, Councilman, Middletown, NJ and director of the Monmouth County, NJ motor pool
- Patsy Townsend, Director of Construction and Code Enforcement, Neptune, NJ
- Joseph McCurnin, Operations Manager for Monmouth County's Division of Transportation
- Thomas Broderick, Assistant Monmouth County Roads Supervisor
- Richard Vuola, Commissioner, Marlboro Municipal Utilities Authority, Marlboro, NJ
- Monmouth County Freeholder Harry Larrison Jr. died before his case came before the court.

== Operation Bid Rig III ==
The third phase of the investigation—Operation Bid Rig III—began after an individual identified by news sources as real estate developer Solomon Dwek of Ocean Township was arrested on charges of committing $50 million in bank fraud in May 2006. Dwek, a well-known member of the Syrian Jewish community whose parents founded the Deal Yeshiva, agreed to become a cooperating witness for the FBI, infiltrating a money-laundering network connecting Israel and Syrian Jewish communities in Brooklyn, New York and Deal, New Jersey. This network has allegedly laundered tens of millions of dollars through charitable non-profit organizations controlled by rabbis in New York and New Jersey. Among the rabbis implicated are Saul J. Kassin of Congregation Shaare Zion in Brooklyn, Eliahu Ben Haim of Congregation Ohel Yaacob in Deal, and Edmond Nahum of the Deal Synagogue.

According to criminal complaints, Dwek (identified as "CW" for "cooperating witness") informed targets of the sting that he was bankrupt and trying to conceal his assets, claiming involvement in illegal businesses including the sale of counterfeit Gucci and Prada handbags, as well as insurance scams and bank frauds. The targets accepted checks made by Dwek made out to their charitable foundations and returned the money to him after deducting a fee. Much of the cash they provided him came from Israel, and some of that in turn came from a Swiss banker, prosecutors said. Prosecutors said that about $3 million had been laundered for Dwek since the beginning of the third phase of the operation in June 2007, much of the money coming from Israel.

The case shifted to focus on public corruption after one of the men accused of money laundering, Moshe Altman of Monsey, New York, a Hudson County developer, introduced Dwek to a politically connected building inspector in Jersey City, who then steered him to another city official, Maher Khalil. Khalil, who is accused of accepting $30,000 in bribes from Mr. Dwek, introduced Dwek to a web of public officials, mayoral and council candidates, and their confidants, whom he called "players"

On July 23, 2009, Acting United States Attorney for the District of New Jersey Ralph J. Marra Jr. announced the arrest of the following 44 people:

Money laundering

- Eliahu Ben Haim, 58, Long Branch, NJ
- Schmulik Cohen, 35, Brooklyn, NY
- Levi Deutsch, 37, Brooklyn, NY
- Yeshayahu Ehrental, 65, Brooklyn, NY
- Mordchai Fish, 56, Brooklyn, NY
- Yolie Gertner, 30, Brooklyn, NY
- David S. Goldhirsh, 30, Brooklyn, NY
- Shimon Haber, 34, Brooklyn, NY
- Saul Kassin, 87, Brooklyn, NY
- Edmund Nahum, 56, Deal, NJ
- Abe Pollack, 40, Brooklyn, NY
- Lavel Schwartz, 57, Brooklyn, NY
- Binyomin Spira, 28, Brooklyn, NY
- Naftoly Weber, 40, Brooklyn, NY
- Arye Weiss, 34, Brooklyn, NY

Human organ trafficking

- Levy-Izhak Rosenbaum, 58, Brooklyn, NY

Political corruption

- Moshe Altman, 39, Monsey, NY
- Charlie Ammon, 33, Lakewood, NJ
- Leona Beldini, 74, Jersey City, NJ
- Peter Cammarano, 32, Hoboken, NJ
- Joseph Cardwell, 68, Jersey City, NJ
- Joseph Castagna, 53, Jersey City, NJ
- Guy Catrillo, 54, Jersey City, NJ
- Edward Cheatam, 61, Jersey City, NJ
- Dennis Elwell, 64, Secaucus, NJ
- Itzak Friedlander, 41, Union City, NJ
- Richard Greene, 45, Jersey City, NJ
- John Guarini, 59, Bayonne, NJ
- Denis Jaslow, 46, Wall, NJ
- Maher A. Khalil, 39, Jersey City, NJ
- James P. "Jimmy" King, 67, Jersey City, NJ
- Louis Manzo, 54, Jersey City, NJ
- Michael Manzo, 53, Jersey City, NJ
- Ronald Manzo, 65, Bayonne, NJ
- Michael Schaffer, 58, Hoboken, NJ
- Lori Serrano, 37, Jersey City, NJ
- Jack Shaw, 61, Jersey City, NJ
- L. Harvey Smith, 60, Jersey City, NJ
- Anthony R. Suarez, 42, Ridgefield, NJ
- Vincent Tabbachino, 68, Fairview, NJ
- Daniel M. Van Pelt, 44, Waretown, NJ
- Mariano Vega, Jr., 59, Jersey City, NJ
- Lavern Webb-Washington, 60, Jersey City, NJ
- Jeffrey Williamson, 57, Lakewood, NJ

Jersey City councilman Philip Kenny, while not one of the original 44 arrested, nevertheless pleaded guilty to taking $5,000 in bribes on October 6, 2009.

=== Organ trafficking ===
Levy Izhak Rosenbaum of Brooklyn was alleged to have been conspiring to arrange the sale of an Israeli citizen's kidney for $160,000. According to the complaint, Rosenbaum told the cooperating witness that he had been involved in the illegal sale of kidneys for 10 years. Acting US Attorney Ralph Marra said "His business was to entice vulnerable people to give up a kidney for $10,000 which he would turn around and sell for $160,000". Anthropologist and organ trade expert Nancy Scheper-Hughes claimed that she had informed the FBI that Rosenbaum was "a major figure" in international organ smuggling 7 years ago, and that many of Rosenbaum's donors had come from Eastern Europe. This is the first organ trafficking case in U.S. history. In October 2011, Rosenbaum pleaded guilty to three counts of organ trafficking and one count of conspiracy.

== Fallout from arrests ==
One of the 44 defendants, political operative Jack Shaw, was found dead in his Jersey City apartment on July 28, 2009. His death was suspected to be a suicide.

Some officials have been sentenced and are serving time in prison. Two were found not guilty. Many have their sentences pending after a federal appeals court judge threw out sentences of extortion based on the Federal Hobbs Act. Prosecutors have decided not to appeal that decision, and they are now reviewing several cases. Other defendants are currently on trial or awaiting trial.

=== Charges dismissed ===
In May 2010, U.S. District Court Judge Jose L. Linares dismissed counts of extortion under the Federal Hobbs Act against Louis Manzo and his brother Ronald Manzo, ruling that the act only applies to elected officials. Louis Manzo then faced two counts of violating the Travel Act, charging him with crossing state lines to commit a crime, and two counts of failing to report to authorities that others were collecting bribes. On February 17, 2012, all remaining charges against Louis Manzo were dismissed by Linares.

=== Sentenced ===
Solomon Dwek pleaded guilty in October 2010, in federal court in Newark to one count each of money laundering and bank fraud charges amounting to about $50 million. Standing before U.S. District Judge Jose L. Linares, Dwek answered questions on attempting to defraud PNC Bank. On October 18, 2012, Dwek was sentenced to six years in federal prison for his conviction on bank fraud charges. The following day, he received a sentence of four years in state prison for the separate fraud charges before the New Jersey Superior Court in Monmouth County. He will serve the two prison terms concurrently.

Moshe "Michael" Altman, Union City real estate developer was sentenced to 41 months in prison for money laundering through the charity Gmach Shefa Chaim. He pleaded guilty to 15 separate instances of money laundering in which he pocketed more than $100,000. Itzhak Friedlander, another Hudson County developer involved with the charity, was sentenced to two years in prison for his role in the money laundering sting. Shimon Haber, a Brooklyn developer, pleaded guilty to conspiracy charges related to the money laundering and was sentenced to 10 months' detention—five in prison and five at home.

Peter Cammarano III, former Hoboken Mayor stepped down as Mayor and was found guilty on August 5, 2010, and given two years in prison. He entered prison in October 2010.

Catrillo entered a guilty plea and was fired by the City of Jersey City. He was sentenced to 18 months in prison, and fined $4000. He entered federal prison in March, 2010.

Kenny was sentenced to one year and one day in prison, two years of supervised release and $4,000 fine. He is set to be released May 4, 2011.

Schaffer stepped down from the North Hudson Sewerage Authority commissioner and pleaded guilty to criminal information and extortion charges. He was sentenced in January 2011 to 18 months in prison.

Van Pelt was sentenced with 41 months in prison. He had resigned from the legislature and was fired from his job as Lumberton Township Administrator on July 25. He entered prison in January 2010.

Vega held onto his seat on the council until pleading guilty to the extortion conspiracy charge in September 2010. The other charges were dismissed. On April 11, 2011, he was sentenced to 30 months in prison.

Rabbi Saul J. Kassin, of the Syrian Jewish Congregation Shaare Zion Synagogue, pleaded guilty to unauthorized money transmitting. He was sentenced to two years probation & fined $36,750, and also ordered to forfeit $367,500 which represented the fees he had taken for the illegal transfers.

=== Found not guilty ===
Anthony Suarez narrowly survived an August 2010 recall election and was found not guilty on October 28, 2010.

L. Harvey Smith was found not guilty on December 16, 2010. He had refused to resign despite intense pressure from his own party and did not stand for re-election in 2009.

=== Pending appeal ===
Beldini stepped down as deputy mayor and was given three years in prison but is free on bail pending appeal.

Jaslow and King both pleaded guilty in 2009 but sentencing has been on hold during the appeal.

Michael Manzo (no relation) pleaded guilty to conspiracy to commit extortion under color of official right and admitted accepting bribes of $5,000 from Dwek. As part of his plea agreement, Manzo agreed to return the money and to cooperate with the government in related prosecutions. He has not been sentenced.

Webb-Washington was sentenced to one year and one day in prison for conspiracy to commit extortion under the color of official right for accepting $15,000 in bribes from informant Dwek. She is free on bail awaiting the prosecutors' decision.

=== Pleaded guilty, not yet sentenced ===
Cheatam pleaded guilty and was a prosecution witness in the trial against Smith. He has not yet been sentenced.

Khalil pleaded guilty and was fired by the City of Jersey City immediately following their guilty pleas. He has been permanently barred from public sector employment but no sentencing has been announced.

Ron Manzo pleaded guilty in May 2011 to conspiring to bribe then-Mayor Dennis Elwell on Dweck's behalf.

On December 3, Ocean County Democratic Party executive director Alfonso L. Santoro, who had not been previously charged, pleaded guilty in a federal court to accepting cash payments from Dwek in exchange for promising to introduce him to public officials, including then-Assemblyman Van Pelt.

Tabbachino was found guilty of bribery extortion in 2010 and pleaded guilty in 2011 to separate charges of laundering $125,000 for Dweck in exchange for a 10% cut. He will be sentenced in August 2011.

Jersey City Housing Inspector John Guarini admitted that he accepted $30,000 in cash bribes from Dweck. He was indicted on one count of conspiracy to obstruct commerce by extortion under color of official right, four counts of attempted obstruction of commerce by extortion, and four counts of bribery. Initially he had pleaded not guilty, but those charges were dropped when he pleaded down to tax evasion. He is awaiting sentencing.

=== Not charged ===
As part of the FBI sweep, the home and office of New Jersey Commissioner of the Department of Community Affairs Joseph Doria were raided but he was not charged. His resignation was announced by Governor Jon Corzine.

Bribery charges against Richard Greene, a Hudson County purchasing agent, were dropped. He later testified against his former employer, Assemblyman L. Harvey Smith, who was acquitted.

== See also ==
- New York divorce coercion gang – a group of rabbis arrested in New Jersey in a sting operation conducted by the Federal Bureau of Investigation
