= Dennis Elwell (politician) =

American mayor (born 1945)

Dennis P. Elwell
- Born: Secaucus, New Jersey, U.S.
- Occupation: Politician

Dennis P. Elwell (born 1945) served as Mayor of Secaucus, New Jersey from 2000 until July 28, 2009, when he resigned after allegations of political corruption.

== Biography ==
Elwell was born in Secaucus, New Jersey and has lived his entire life there. His father, Nelson Howard Elwell, was a seven-term councilman in Secaucus.

In 1965, Elwell left Secaucus to serve in the U.S. Army during the Vietnam War. His Army unit, the 173rd Airborne Brigade, was the first major ground combat unit to serve in Vietnam.

Elwell was elected to the board of education of the Secaucus Public Schools in 1991. In 1992, he was elected to the Town Council as an independent. He unsuccessfully ran against Mayor Anthony E. Just three times. In 1999, he joined the Democratic Party and defeated Just in the Democratic primary, and went on to win the general election. He was re-elected mayor in 2001 and 2005.

Elwell was a strong proponent of the construction of Secaucus Junction, a major rail hub that opened in 2003.

Elwell is president of his family's trucking business, N.H. Elwell & Sons. He and his wife, Annette, have two children, Jason, and Alexis. A son, Travis, died in 1989 at the age of 18 when his car was hit by an oncoming New Jersey Transit train.

== Arrest and conviction on federal corruption charges ==
On July 23, 2009, Elwell was arrested as part of Operation Bid Rig, a joint operation of the FBI, the IRS, and the U.S. Attorney's Office for the District of New Jersey into political corruption and money laundering. Elwell was charged with accepting a $10,000 cash bribe from an FBI informant who sought assistance in building a hotel in Secaucus.

Five days after his arrest, on July 28, Elwell announced that effective immediately, he would resign his position as mayor. In a statement announcing his resignation, Elwell said, "Those who perceive this action to be an admission of culpability as to the pending criminal allegations are gravely mistaken." Elwell was immediately succeeded by John Reilly, who had been serving as councilman and deputy mayor. Richard Steffens was then selected as mayor.

On November 17, 2009, Elwell and alleged middleman Ronald Manzo were formally indicted on three counts: conspiracy to commit extortion, attempted extortion, and accepting corrupt payments in connection with a business transaction with a municipality that received federal funds. The charges carry maximum prison terms of 20 years. On December 4, Elwell and Manzo pleaded not guilty.

Manzo eventually pleaded guilty and became the government's star witness against Elwell. On July 6, 2011, Elwell was found guilty on the bribery charge and acquitted of charges of attempted extortion and conspiracy to commit extortion.

Prior to sentencing, he suffered an aneurysm. In 2011, Elwell, then 66 years old, was sentenced to two and a half years in prison. He was imprisoned at the Federal Correctional Complex, Butner, and his appeal was rejected. While in prison, Elwell suffered from kidney stones and worked as a groundskeeper. He was released in October 2014 and returned to his home in Secaucus's North End.
