= David Schenk Jacobus =

American mechanical engineer

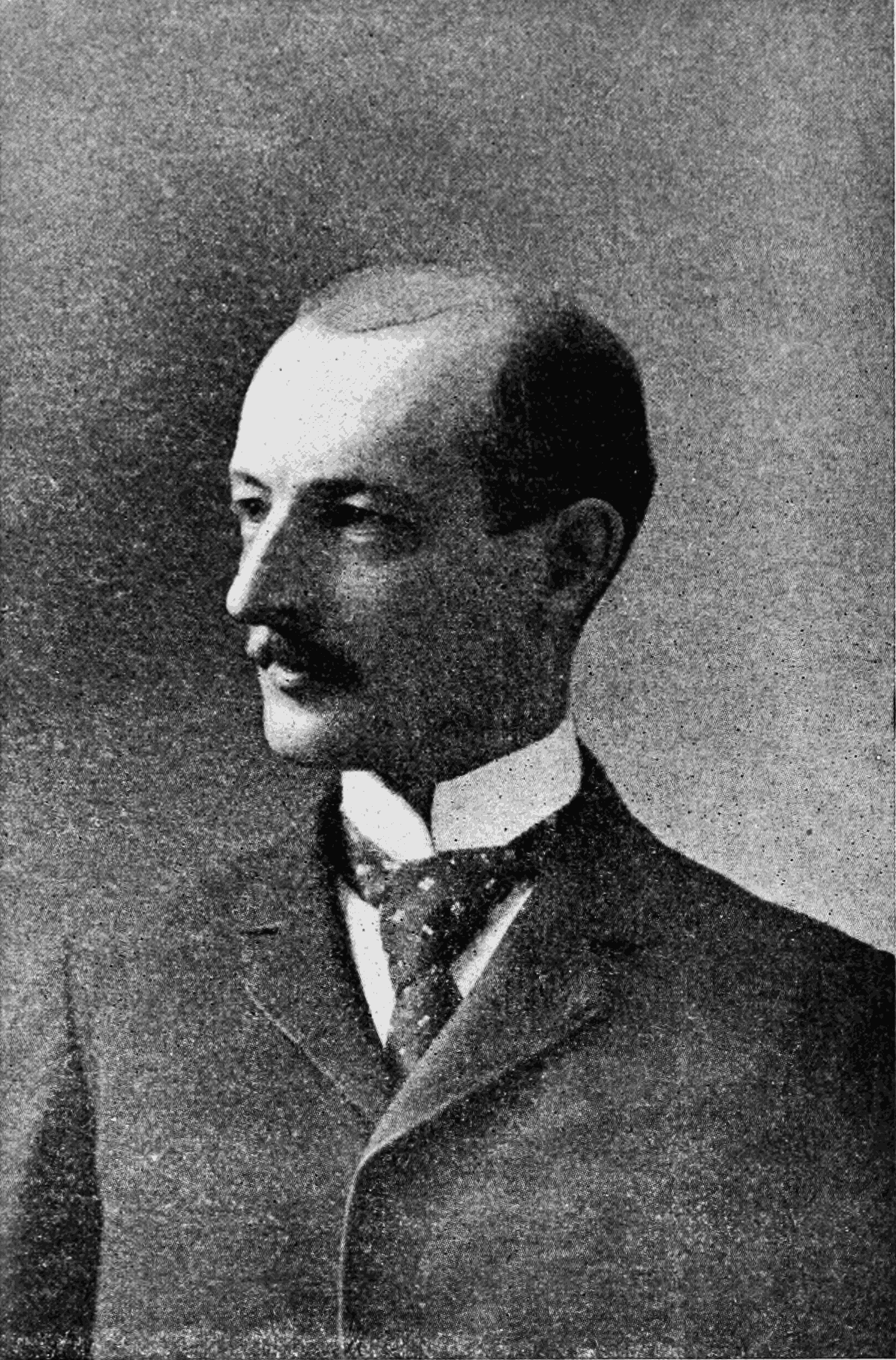
David S. Jacobus

David Schenk Jacobus (January 20, 1862 – February 11, 1955) was an American mechanical engineer, head of the Engineering Department of Babcock & Wilcox, inventor and educator, who served as president of the American Society of Mechanical Engineers in the year 1916–17.

== Biography ==
Jacobus was born in Ridgefield, New Jersey as son of Nicholas Jacobus and Sarah Catharine Jacobus. His father worked at the family business, D. Jacobus & Son, manufacturers, of New York City. After private school and Stevens high school, he attended the Stevens Institute of Technology, where he graduated in 1884.

After graduation Jacobus made his career in industry, working his way up to head of the Engineering Department of Babcock & Wilcox. At the Stevens Institute of Technology he became a trustee and special lecturer in experimental engineering.

Jacobus was awarded an honorary degree of Doctor of Engineering (Dr.Eng.) by the Stevens Institute of Technology in 1906. He was president of the ASRE American Society of Refrigerating Engineers in 1907–07, now part of the ASHRAE, and served member of its first board of directors. He also served as president of the American Society of Mechanical Engineers in the year 1916–17, and was elected Honorary Member of the ASME in 1934.

== Selected publications ==
- D.S. Jacobus. Latest developments in compressed air-motors for tramways. New York, 1890.

=== Patents, a selection ===
- D.S. Jacobus Patent US1320059 - Furnace-wall, 1919.
- D.S. Jacobus Patent US1341213 - Steam-boiler economizer and method of operating same, 1920.
- D.S. Jacobus Patent US1365321 - Underfeed-stoker boiler, 1921.
- D.S. Jacobus Patent US2047633 - Pressure vessel and method of making the same, 1936.
- D.S. Jacobus Patent US2209974 - Fluid heat exchange apparatus, 1940.
