= Ridgefield School District (New Jersey) =

School district in Bergen County, New Jersey, US

Address
- 555 Chestnut Street Ridgefield, Bergen County, New Jersey, 07657; United States
- Coordinates: 40.830634°N 73.998497°W

District information
- Grades: PreK-12
- Superintendent: Alex Anemone
- Business administrator: Kelvin Hiciano
- Schools: 4

Students and staff
- Enrollment: 1,391 (as of 2021–22)
- Faculty: 160.0 FTEs
- Student–teacher ratio: 8.7:1

Other information
- District Factor Group: DE
- Website: www.ridgefieldschools.com
Ind.	Per pupil	District spending	Rank (*)	K-12 average	%± vs. average
1A	Total Spending	$20,501	40	$18,891	8.5%
1	Budgetary Cost	17,491	43	14,783	18.3%
2	Classroom Instruction	11,199	47	8,763	27.8%
6	Support Services	2,823	41	2,392	18.0%
8	Administrative Cost	1,473	9	1,485	−0.8%
10	Operations & Maintenance	1,548	23	1,783	−13.2%
13	Extracurricular Activities	385	17	268	43.7%
16	Median Teacher Salary	66,664	41	64,043
Data from NJDoE 2014 Taxpayers' Guide to Education Spending. *Of K-12 districts with up to 1,800 students. Lowest spending=1; Highest=49

The Ridgefield School District is a comprehensive community public school district that serves students in pre-kindergarten through twelfth grade from the Borough of Ridgefield, in Bergen County, in the U.S. state of New Jersey.

As of the 2021–22 school year, the district, comprised of four schools, had an enrollment of 1,391 students and 160.0 classroom teachers (on an FTE basis), for a student–teacher ratio of 8.7:1.

The district had been classified by the New Jersey Department of Education as being in District Factor Group "DE", the fourth-lowest of eight groupings. District Factor Groups organize districts statewide to allow comparison by common socioeconomic characteristics of the local districts. From lowest socioeconomic status to highest, the categories are A, B, CD, DE, FG, GH, I and J.

The district offers a wide variety of opportunities for students of all abilities to grow academically, socially, and emotionally, including a special education magnet school. Since the early 1990s, the district has served special needs youngsters from Ridgefield and from other districts in a state-recognized program, using learning centers at all four schools.

Ridgefield's Academic Decathlon team consistently places among regional and state competitions. The district's schools offer a full range of athletics at all levels.

== Schools ==
Schools in the district (with 2021–22 enrollment from the National Center for Education Statistics) are:

Elementary schools

- Shaler Academy with 160 students in grades PreK/K
  - Jeanine McGlynn, principal
- Bergen Boulevard School with 192 students in grades 1–2
  - Peter Mastrangelo, principal
- Slocum-Skewes School with 687 students in grades 3–8
  - Timothy Yang, principal

High school

- Ridgefield Memorial High School with 489 students in grades 9–12
  - Joseph Romeo, principal

== Administration ==
Core members of the district's administration are:

- Alex Anemone, superintendent of schools
- Kelvin Hiciano, business administrator and board secretary

== Board of education ==
The district's board of education, comprised of seven members, sets policy and oversees the fiscal and educational operation of the district through its administration. As a Type II school district, the board's trustees are elected directly by voters to serve three-year terms of office on a staggered basis, with either two or three seats up for election each year held (since 2012) as part of the November general election. The board appoints a superintendent to oversee the district's day-to-day operations and a business administrator to supervise the business functions of the district.
