= Ridgefield, New Jersey =

Borough in Bergen County, New Jersey, US

Coordinates: 40.832677°N 74.014088°W

- Boroughx
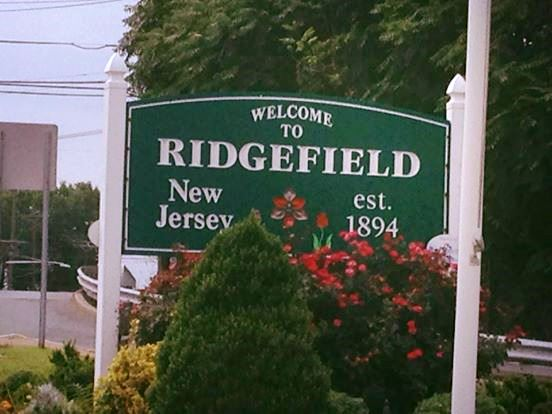

- Seal

- Location of Ridgefield in Bergen County highlighted in red (left). Inset map: Location of Bergen County in New Jersey highlighted in orange (right).

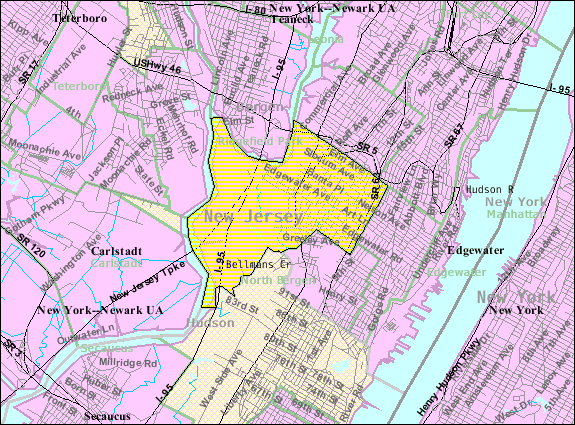
- Census Bureau map of Ridgefield, New Jersey

- Location in Bergen County Location in New Jersey Location in the United States
- Country: United States
- State: New Jersey
- County: Bergen
- Incorporated: May 26, 1892

Government
  - Type: Borough
  - Body: Borough Council
  - Mayor: Hugo Jimenez (D, term ends December 31, 2027)
  - Administrator: Ray Ramirez
  - Municipal clerk: Linda Silvestri

Area
  - Total: 2.87 sq mi (7.43 km^{2})
  - Land: 2.54 sq mi (6.59 km^{2})
  - Water: 0.33 sq mi (0.85 km^{2}) 11.39%
  - Rank: 345th of 565 in state 31st of 70 in county
- Elevation: 10 ft (3.0 m)

Population (2020)
  - Total: 11,501
  - Estimate (2023): 11,417
  - Rank: 218th of 565 in state 32nd of 70 in county
  - Density: 4,522.6/sq mi (1,746.2/km^{2})
  - Rank: 132nd of 565 in state 33rd of 70 in county
- Time zone: UTC−05:00 (Eastern (EST))
  - Summer (DST): UTC−04:00 (Eastern (EDT))
- ZIP Code: 07657
- Area code: 201
- FIPS code: 3400362910
- GNIS feature ID: 0885367
- Website: www.ridgefieldnj.gov

Ridgefield is a borough in Bergen County, in the U.S. state of New Jersey. As of the 2020 United States census, the borough's population was 11,501, an increase of 469 (+4.3%) from the 2010 census count of 11,032, which in turn reflected an increase of 202 (+1.9%) from the 10,830 counted in the 2000 census.

Ridgefield was incorporated as a borough by an act of the New Jersey Legislature on May 26, 1892, from portions of Ridgefield Township. The borough was named for the area's terrain.

== History ==
At the time of European colonization, the area was home to the Hackensack tribe of the Lenape Native Americans, who maintained a large settlement to the north on Overpeck Creek. Their name is an exonym taken from the territory and is translated as place of stony ground which describes the diminishing Hudson Palisades as they descend into the Meadowlands becoming the ridgefield that is part of Hackensack River flood plain.

In 1642, Myndert Myndertsen received a patroonship as part of the New Netherland colony for much the land in the Hackensack and Passaic valleys. He called his settlement Achter Kol, or rear mountain pass, which refers to its accessibility to the interior behind the Palisades. Originally spared in the conflicts that begin with the Pavonia Massacre, the nascent colony was later abandoned. In 1655, Oratam, sachem of the Hackensack, deeded a large tract nearby to Sara Kiersted, who had learned the native language and was instrumental in negotiations between Native Americans and the settlers. In 1668, much of the land between Overpeck Creek and the Hudson River was purchased by Samuel Edsall, and soon became known as the English Neighborhood, despite the fact most of the settlers were of Dutch and Huguenot origin.

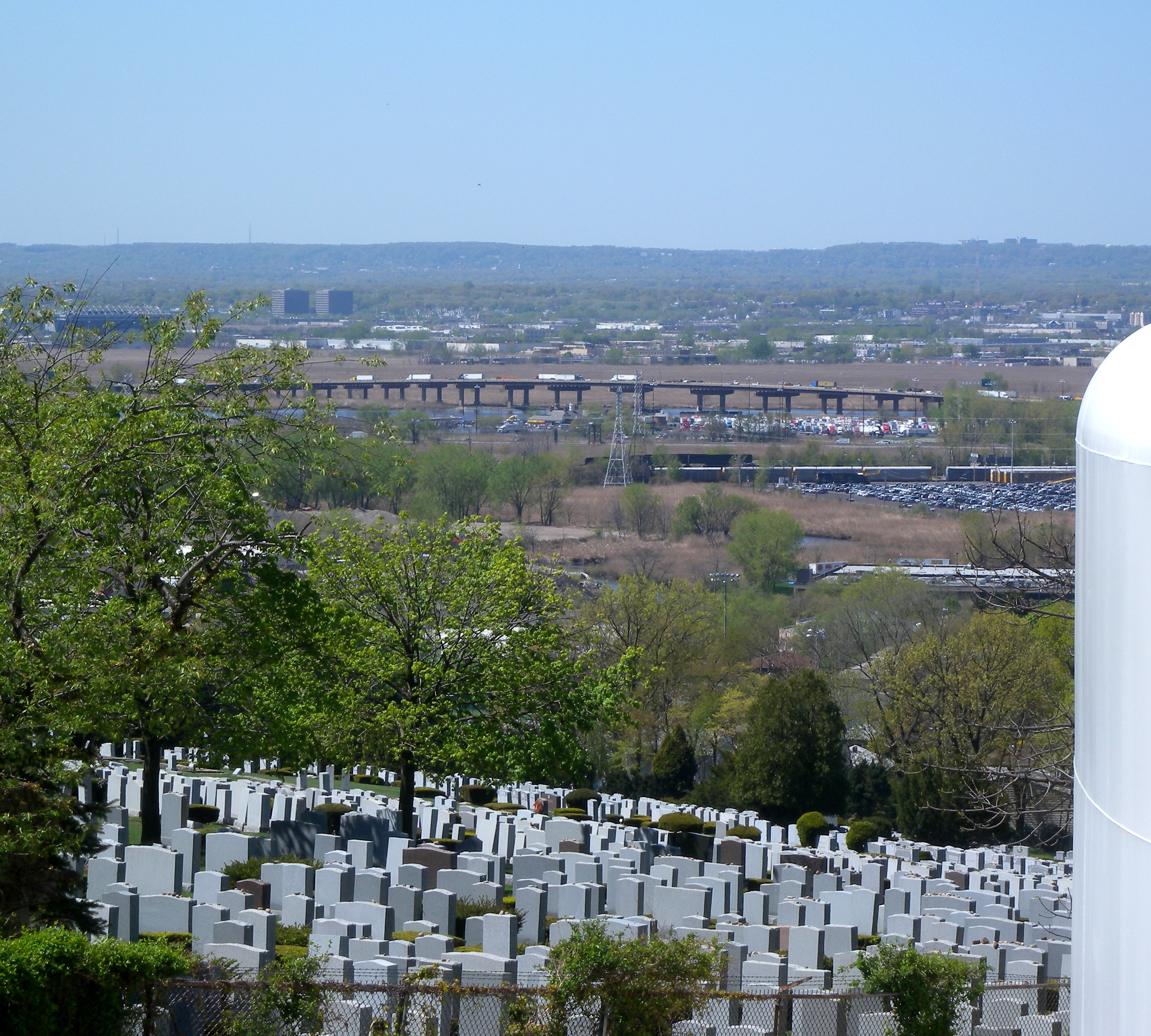
The northern reaches of the New Jersey Meadowlands Commission looking west to rail line, New Jersey Turnpike and Hackensack River

The opening of the West Shore Railroad and Erie Railroad's Northern Branch in the mid 19th century brought suburbanization to the region, and in Ridgefield, significant industry and manufacturing. Grantwood was an artist's colony established in 1913 by Man Ray, Alfred Kreymborg and Samuel Halpert and became known as the "Others" group of artists. The colony consisted of a number of clapboard shacks on a bluff. To this day the names of the streets in this part of the town—Sketch Place, Studio Road and Art Lane—pay homage to Grantwood's history. Kreymborg moved to Ridgefield and launched Others: A Magazine of the New Verse with Skipwith Cannell, Wallace Stevens, and William Carlos Williams in 1915.

The initial 118 miles (190 km) of the New Jersey Turnpike were completed in 1952, with the original northern terminus at an interchange connecting to Route 46 in Ridgefield. An additional four-mile stretch of road connecting the Turnpike from Ridgefield to I-80 in Teaneck and from there to the George Washington Bridge was completed in 1964. The western spur was added in the 1970s, with its two spurs re-connecting in the western side of the borough.

In the 1970s, the area came under the auspices of the Hackensack Meadowlands Development Commission, meant to set parameters and balance development in the ecologically sensitive region. Some parts of the low-lying areas, including Skeetkill Creek Marsh, have been set apart as nature reserves and extension of system that connects to the Overpeck Reserve and Overpeck County Park.

== Geography ==
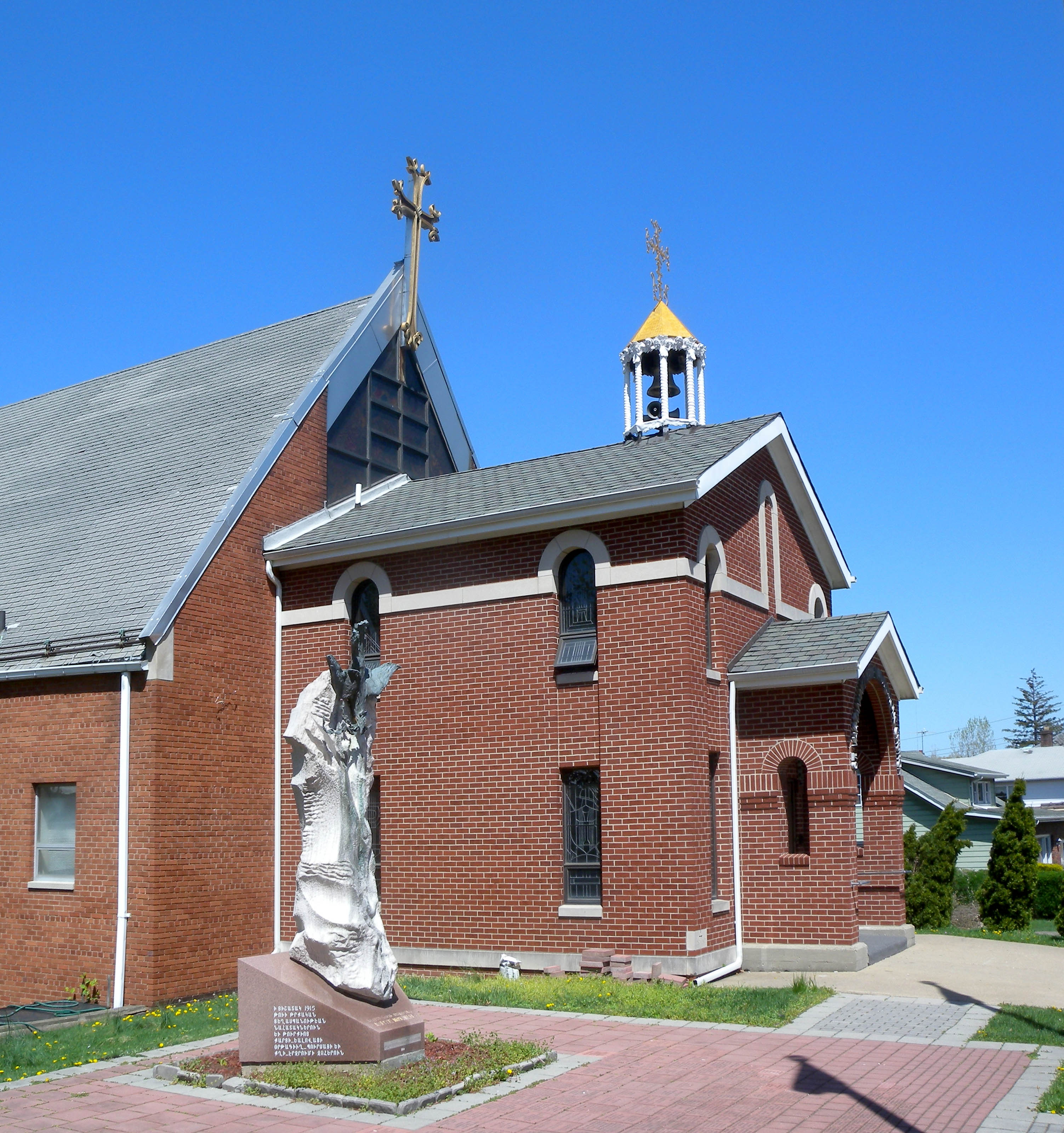
Armenian Apostolic Church on Bergen Boulevard

According to the United States Census Bureau, the borough had a total area of 2.87 square miles (7.43 km^{2}), including 2.54 square miles (6.59 km^{2}) of land and 0.33 square miles (0.85 km^{2}) of water (11.39%).

The borough shares borders with Carlstadt, Cliffside Park, Fairview, Fort Lee, Little Ferry, Palisades Park, Ridgefield Park and South Hackensack in Bergen County; and North Bergen in Hudson County.

The borough is informally divided into three sections based on the geographical contour of the land. The first section is known as Ridgefield, and lies partly in the valley on both the east and west sides and partly on the first hill. The second section is known as Morsemere, and is located in the northern part of the borough. The third section is Ridgefield Heights, on the second hill at the extreme eastern part of the borough, running north and south.

Undercliff Junction is an unincorporated community located within Ridgefield.. Morsemere, which includes the southernmost part of Palisade Park, was named by a real estate development company in honor of Samuel F. B. Morse, inventor of the telegraph and Morse code. During the middle of the 19th century, Morse owned vast tracts of land in the borough. Ridgefield's telephone exchange was Morsemere 6 until dial service arrived in the mid-1950s. Grantwood straddles Cliffside Park.

== Demographics ==
Historical population
Census	Pop.	Note	%±
1900	584		—
1910	966		65.4%
1920	1,560		61.5%
1930	4,671		199.4%
1940	5,271		12.8%
1950	8,312		57.7%
1960	10,788		29.8%
1970	11,308		4.8%
1980	10,294		−9.0%
1990	9,996		−2.9%
2000	10,830		8.3%
2010	11,032		1.9%
2020	11,501		4.3%
2023 (est.)	11,417	▼	−0.7%
Population sources: 1900–1920 1900–1910; 1910–1930 1900–2020; 2000 2010 2020

=== Racial and ethnic composition ===
Ridgefield borough, New Jersey – Racial and ethnic composition Note: the US Census treats Hispanic/Latino as an ethnic category. This table excludes Latinos from the racial categories and assigns them to a separate category. Hispanics/Latinos may be of any race.
Race / Ethnicity (NH = Non-Hispanic)	Pop 2000	Pop 2010	Pop 2020	% 2000	% 2010	% 2020
White alone (NH)	7,189	5,215	4,281	66.38%	47.27%	37.22%
Black or African American alone (NH)	71	95	200	0.66%	0.86%	1.74%
Native American or Alaska Native alone (NH)	6	4	10	0.06%	0.04%	0.09%
Asian alone (NH)	1,881	3,199	3,319	17.37%	29.00%	28.86%
Native Hawaiian or Pacific Islander alone (NH)	4	0	4	0.04%	0.00%	0.03%
Other race alone (NH)	27	35	107	0.25%	0.32%	0.93%
Mixed race or Multiracial (NH)	158	122	237	1.46%	1.11%	2.06%
Hispanic or Latino (any race)	1,494	2,362	3,343	13.80%	21.41%	29.07%
Total	10,830	11,032	11,501	100.00%	100.00%	100.00%

=== 2020 census ===
As of the 2020 census, Ridgefield had a population of 11,501. The median age was 41.4 years. 18.9% of residents were under the age of 18 and 15.8% of residents were 65 years of age or older. For every 100 females there were 94.1 males, and for every 100 females age 18 and over there were 91.2 males age 18 and over.

100.0% of residents lived in urban areas, while 0.0% lived in rural areas.

There were 4,050 households in Ridgefield, of which 32.9% had children under the age of 18 living in them. Of all households, 54.4% were married-couple households, 15.0% were households with a male householder and no spouse or partner present, and 26.7% were households with a female householder and no spouse or partner present. About 19.8% of all households were made up of individuals and 9.1% had someone living alone who was 65 years of age or older.

There were 4,237 housing units, of which 4.4% were vacant. The homeowner vacancy rate was 0.9% and the rental vacancy rate was 2.6%.

=== Income and poverty ===
According to the United States Census Bureau's 2023 QuickFacts, the median household income in Ridgefield was $115,676, and the poverty rate was 5.05%.

=== 2010 census ===
The 2010 United States census counted 11,032 people, 3,905 households, and 2,995 families in the borough. The population density was 4,323.7 per square mile (1,669.4/km^{2}). There were 4,145 housing units at an average density of 1,624.5 per square mile (627.2/km^{2}). The racial makeup was 62.31% (6,874) White, 1.20% (132) Black or African American, 0.18% (20) Native American, 29.06% (3,206) Asian, 0.02% (2) Pacific Islander, 4.66% (514) from other races, and 2.57% (284) from two or more races. Hispanic or Latino of any race were 21.41% (2,362) of the population. Korean Americans accounted for 25.7% of the population.

Of the 3,905 households, 33.7% had children under the age of 18; 58.9% were married couples living together; 13.0% had a female householder with no husband present and 23.3% were non-families. Of all households, 19.9% were made up of individuals and 9.6% had someone living alone who was 65 years of age or older. The average household size was 2.82 and the average family size was 3.25. Same-sex couples headed 31 households in 2010, an increase from the 24 counted in 2000.

21.6% of the population were under the age of 18, 8.2% from 18 to 24, 25.6% from 25 to 44, 30.3% from 45 to 64, and 14.3% who were 65 years of age or older. The median age was 41.5 years. For every 100 females, the population had 92.0 males. For every 100 females ages 18 and older there were 89.5 males.

The Census Bureau's 2006–2010 American Community Survey showed that (in 2010 inflation-adjusted dollars) median household income was $59,784 (with a margin of error of +/− $12,149) and the median family income was $76,618 (+/− $5,428). Males had a median income of $51,682 (+/− $4,297) versus $39,178 (+/− $5,838) for females. The per capita income for the borough was $28,107 (+/− $2,625). About 3.7% of families and 5.5% of the population were below the poverty line, including 4.2% of those under age 18 and 7.5% of those age 65 or over.

=== 2000 census ===
As of the 2000 United States census there were 10,830 people, 4,020 households, and 2,966 families residing in the borough. The population density was 4,149.8 inhabitants per square mile (1,602.2/km^{2}). There were 4,120 housing units at an average density of 1,578.7 per square mile (609.5/km^{2}). The racial makeup of the borough was 75.87% White, 0.77% African American, 0.08% Native American, 17.42% Asian, 0.04% Pacific Islander, 3.50% from other races, and 2.32% from two or more races. Hispanic or Latino of any race were 13.80% of the population.

As of the 2000 Census, 16.31% of Ridgefield's residents identified themselves as being of Korean ancestry, which was the sixth highest in the United States and fourth highest of any municipality in New Jersey—behind Palisades Park (36.38%), Leonia (17.24%) and Fort Lee (17.18%)—for all places with 1,000 or more residents identifying their ancestry. In the same census, 3.0% of Ridgefield's residents identified themselves as being of Croatian ancestry. This was the third highest percentage of people with Croatian ancestry in any place in New Jersey with 1,000 or more residents identifying their ancestry. 2.4% of Ridgefield's residents identified themselves as being of Armenian ancestry, the 16th highest percentage of Armenian people in any place in the United States with 1,000 or more residents identifying their ancestry. As of the 2000 Census, 1.3% of residents identified themselves as being of Turkish American ancestry, the seventh-highest of any municipality in the United States and fifth-highest in the state.

There were 4,020 households, out of which 32.1% had children under the age of 18 living with them, 59.7% were married couples living together, 9.9% had a female householder with no husband present, and 26.2% were non-families. 23.0% of all households were made up of individuals, and 11.8% had someone living alone who was 65 years of age or older. The average household size was 2.69 and the average family size was 3.19.

In the borough, the population was spread out, with 21.8% under the age of 18, 6.3% from 18 to 24, 31.5% from 25 to 44, 23.3% from 45 to 64, and 17.1% who were 65 years of age or older. The median age was 40 years. For every 100 females, there were 93.7 males. For every 100 females age 18 and over, there were 88.8 males.

The median income for a household in the borough was $54,081, and the median income for a family was $66,330. Males had a median income of $47,975 versus $36,676 for females. The per capita income for the borough was $25,558. About 4.7% of families and 6.6% of the population were below the poverty line, including 6.4% of those under age 18 and 6.7% of those age 65 or over.

== Government ==
=== Local government ===
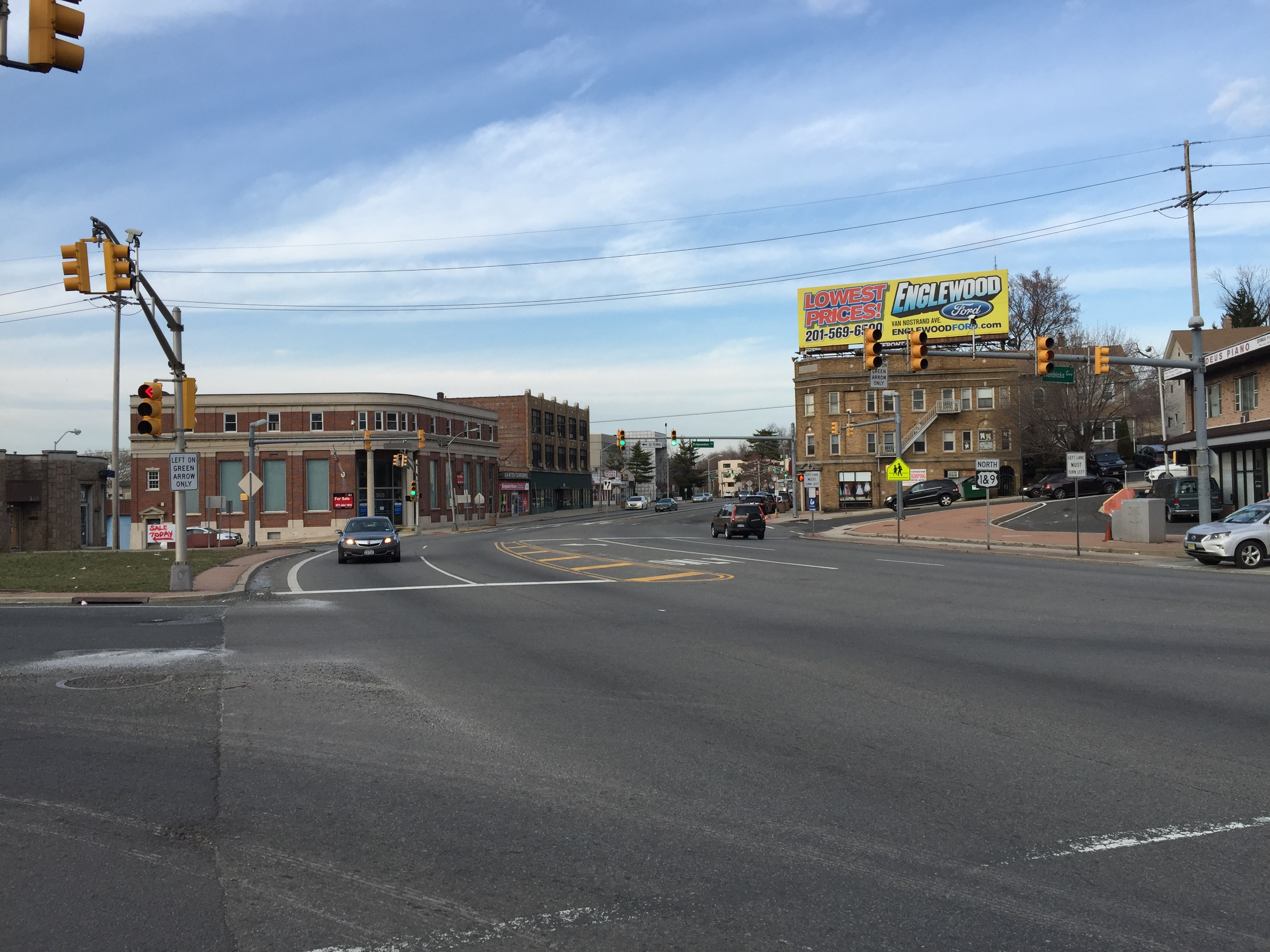
Broad Avenue in Ridgefield

Ridgefield is governed under the borough form of New Jersey municipal government, which is used in 218 municipalities (of the 564) statewide, making it the most common form of government in New Jersey. The governing body is comprised of a mayor and a borough council, with all positions elected at-large on a partisan basis as part of the November general election. A mayor is elected directly by the voters to a four-year term of office. The borough council includes six members elected to serve three-year terms on a staggered basis, with two seats coming up for election each year in a three-year cycle. The borough form of government used by Ridgefield is a "weak mayor / strong council" government in which council members act as the legislative body with the mayor presiding at meetings and voting only in the event of a tie. The mayor can veto ordinances subject to an override by a two-thirds majority vote of the council. The mayor makes committee and liaison assignments for council members, and most appointments are made by the mayor with the advice and consent of the council.

As of 2025, the mayor of Ridgefield Borough is Democrat Hugo Jimenez, who was elected to serve a four-year term ending on December 31, 2027. Members of the Ridgefield Borough Council are Council President Joanna Leigh Congalton-Hali (D, 2025), James V. Kontolios (D, 2025), Yongki Colin Ryu (D, 2027), Gino S. Ramundo (R, 2026), Sarah H. Kim (R, 2026), and Mohamed Tejada Jaafar (R, 2027).

Hugo Jimenez was appointed as mayor to fill the unexpired seat of Anthony R. Suarez expiring in December 2023 that became vacant when he took a seat as a judge. Joanna Leigh Congalton-Hali was appointed to fill the council seat Jimenez had held expiring in December 2025.

In January 2023, the borough council selected Yongki Colin Ryu to fill the seat expiring in December 2024 that had been held by Ray Penabad until he resigned from office; Ryu will serve on an interim basis until the November 2023 general election, when voters will select a candidate to serve the balance of the term of office.

In June 2018, the borough council selected Lauren Larkin from a list of three candidates to fill the seat expiring in December 2020 that became vacant following the resignation of Javier Acosta. Larkin served on an interim basis until the November 2018 general election, when she was elected to serve the balance of the term of office.

In July 2009, Mayor Suarez was one of 44 people arrested across the state as part of Operation Bid Rig, a joint investigation into political corruption and money laundering. Suarez was charged with accepting a $10,000 cash bribe for assistance in arranging approvals to develop properties in Ridgefield. In a special election in August 2010, an effort to recall Suarez failed by a 38-vote margin. He was acquitted on all charges in October 2010.

=== Federal, state and county representation ===
Ridgefield is located in the 9th Congressional District and is part of New Jersey's 36th state legislative district.

For the 119th United States Congress, New Jersey's 9th congressional district is represented by Nellie Pou (D, North Haledon) New Jersey is represented in the United States Senate by Democrats Cory Booker (Newark, term ends 2027) and Andy Kim (Moorestown, term ends 2031).

For the 2026–2027 session, the 36th legislative district of the New Jersey Legislature is represented in the State Senate by Paul Sarlo (D, Wood-Ridge) and in the General Assembly by Clinton Calabrese (D, Cliffside Park) and Gary Schaer (D, Passaic).

Bergen County is governed by a directly elected County Executive, with legislative functions performed by a Board of County Commissioners comprised of seven members who are elected at-large to three-year terms in partisan elections on a staggered basis, with either two or three seats coming up for election each November; a Chairman and Vice Chairman are selected from among its seven members at a reorganization meeting held every January. As of 2025, the county executive is James J. Tedesco III (D, Paramus), whose four-year term of office ends December 31, 2026.

Bergen County's Commissioners are Chair Mary J. Amoroso (D, Mahwah, 2025), Vice Chair Steven A. Tanelli (D, North Arlington, 2027), Chair Pro Tem Joan Voss (D, Fort Lee, 2026), Rafael Marte (D, Bergenfield, 2026), Germaine M. Ortiz (D, Emerson, 2025), Thomas J. Sullivan Jr. (D, Montvale, 2025) and Tracy Silna Zur (D, Franklin Lakes, 2027).

Bergen County's elected constitutional officials are Clerk John S. Hogan (D, Northvale, 2026), Sheriff Anthony Cureton (D, Englewood, 2027) and Surrogate Michael R. Dressler (D, Cresskill, 2026).

=== Politics ===
United States presidential election results for Ridgefield 2024 2020 2016 2012 2008 2004
Year	Republican		Democratic		Third party(ies)	
Year	No.	%	No.	%	No.	%
2024	2,330	52.51%	1,973	44.47%	134	3.02%
2020	2,212	44.47%	2,730	54.89%	32	0.64%
2016	1,865	43.86%	2,270	53.39%	117	2.75%
2012	1,570	39.93%	2,320	59.00%	42	1.07%
2008	1,960	45.38%	2,319	53.69%	40	0.93%
2004	2,038	48.15%	2,172	51.31%	23	0.54%

As of March 2011, there were a total of 5,467 registered voters in Ridgefield, of which 1,810 (33.1% vs. 31.7% countywide) were registered as Democrats, 1,098 (20.1% vs. 21.1%) were registered as Republicans and 2,558 (46.8% vs. 47.1%) were registered as Unaffiliated. There was one voter registered to another party. Among the borough's 2010 Census population, 49.6% (vs. 57.1% in Bergen County) were registered to vote, including 63.2% of those ages 18 and over (vs. 73.7% countywide).

Gubernatorial election results for Ridgefield
Year	Republican		Democratic		Third party(ies)	
Year	No.	%	No.	%	No.	%
2025	1,450	45.83%	1,687	53.32%	27	0.85%
2021	1,177	49.64%	1,179	49.73%	15	0.63%
2017	698	38.27%	1,093	59.92%	33	1.81%
2013	1,410	56.79%	1,040	41.88%	33	1.33%
2009	1,281	45.36%	1,390	49.22%	153	5.42%
2005	1,272	45.30%	1,476	52.56%	60	2.14%

In the 2012 presidential election, Democrat Barack Obama received 2,320 votes here (58.3% vs. 54.8% countywide), ahead of Republican Mitt Romney with 1,570 votes (39.4% vs. 43.5%) and other candidates with 42 votes (1.1% vs. 0.9%), among the 3,980 ballots cast by the borough's 5,848 registered voters, for a turnout of 68.1% (vs. 70.4% in Bergen County). In the 2008 presidential election, Democrat Barack Obama received 2,319 votes here (53.0% vs. 53.9% countywide), ahead of Republican John McCain with 1,960 votes (44.8% vs. 44.5%) and other candidates with 40 votes (0.9% vs. 0.8%), among the 4,372 ballots cast by the borough's 5,853 registered voters, for a turnout of 74.7% (vs. 76.8% in Bergen County). In the 2004 presidential election, Democrat John Kerry received 2,172 votes here (51.0% vs. 51.7% countywide), ahead of Republican George W. Bush with 2,038 votes (47.8% vs. 47.2%) and other candidates with 23 votes (0.5% vs. 0.7%), among the 4,262 ballots cast by the borough's 5,845 registered voters, for a turnout of 72.9% (vs. 76.9% in the whole county).

In the 2013 gubernatorial election, Republican Chris Christie received 56.8% of the vote (1,410 cast), ahead of Democrat Barbara Buono with 41.9% (1,040 votes), and other candidates with 1.3% (33 votes), among the 2,625 ballots cast by the borough's 5,586 registered voters (142 ballots were spoiled), for a turnout of 47.0%. In the 2009 gubernatorial election, Democrat Jon Corzine received 1,390 ballots cast (48.0% vs. 48.0% countywide), ahead of Republican Chris Christie with 1,281 votes (44.2% vs. 45.8%), Independent Chris Daggett with 135 votes (4.7% vs. 4.7%) and other candidates with 18 votes (0.6% vs. 0.5%), among the 2,898 ballots cast by the borough's 5,658 registered voters, yielding a 51.2% turnout (vs. 50.0% in the county).

United States Senate election results for Ridgefield1
Year	Republican		Democratic		Third party(ies)	
Year	No.	%	No.	%	No.	%
2024	1,902	46.36%	2,053	50.04%	148	3.61%
2018	1,184	40.66%	1,644	56.46%	84	2.88%
2012	1,342	37.17%	2,218	61.44%	50	1.39%
2006	1,325	45.52%	1,548	53.18%	38	1.31%

United States Senate election results for Ridgefield2
Year	Republican		Democratic		Third party(ies)	
Year	No.	%	No.	%	No.	%
2020	1,951	40.74%	2,722	56.84%	116	2.42%
2014	973	41.71%	1,318	56.49%	42	1.80%
2013	585	49.53%	585	49.53%	11	0.93%
2008	1,557	40.56%	2,238	58.30%	44	1.15%

== Education ==
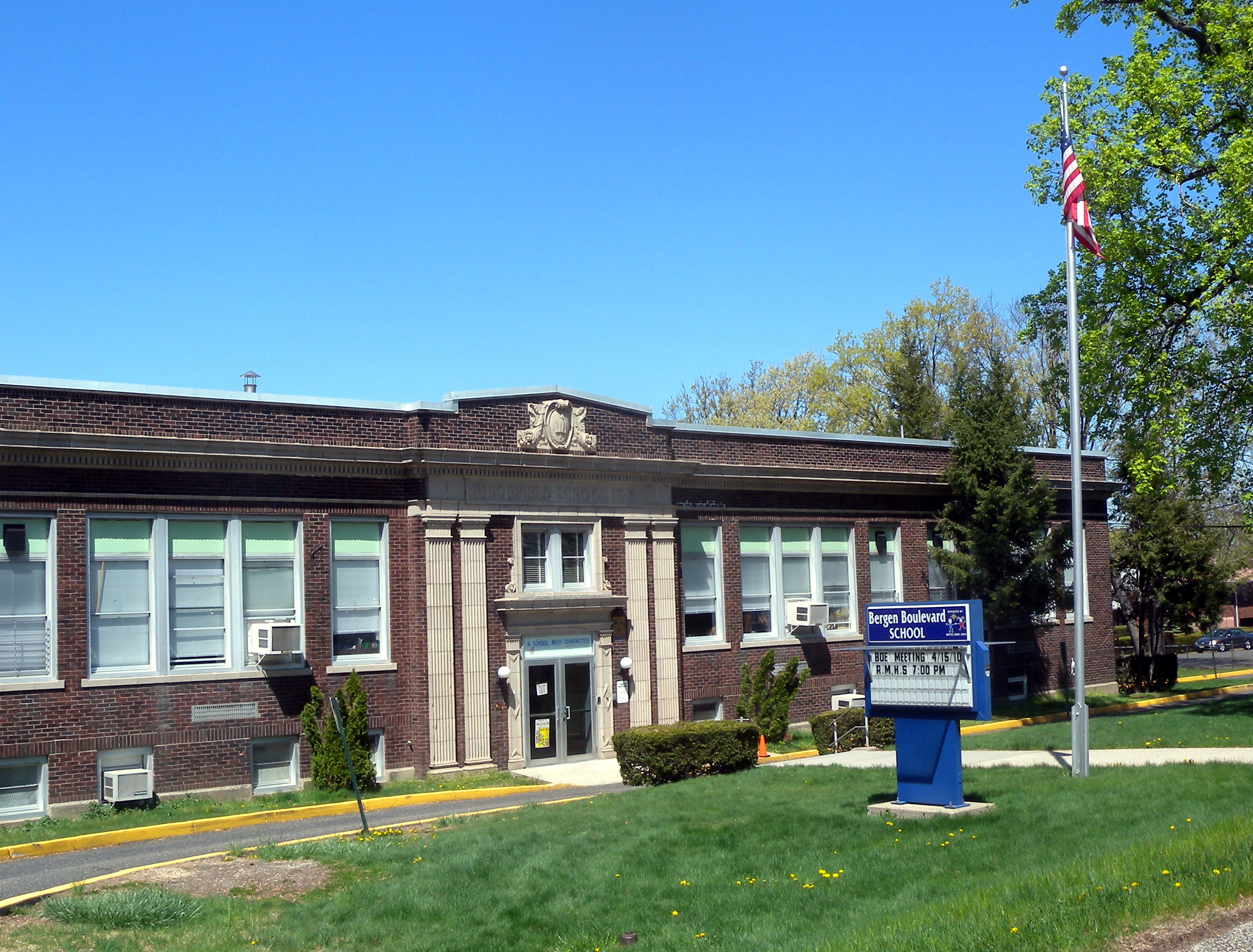
Bergen Boulevard School

The Ridgefield School District serves public school students in pre-kindergarten through twelfth grade. As of the 2021–22 school year, the district, comprised of four schools, had an enrollment of 1,391 students and 160.0 classroom teachers (on an FTE basis), for a student–teacher ratio of 8.7:1. Schools in the district (with 2021–22 enrollment from the National Center for Education Statistics) are: Shaler Academy with 160 students in grades PreK/K, Bergen Boulevard School with 192 students in grades 1-2, Slocum-Skewes School with 687 students in grades 3-8 and Ridgefield Memorial High School with 489 students in grades 9-12.

Public school students from the borough, and all of Bergen County, are eligible to attend the secondary education programs offered by the Bergen County Technical Schools, which include the Bergen County Academies in Hackensack, and the Bergen Tech campus in Teterboro or Paramus. The district offers programs on a shared-time or full-time basis, with admission based on a selective application process and tuition covered by the student's home school district.

== Transportation ==
=== Roads and highways ===
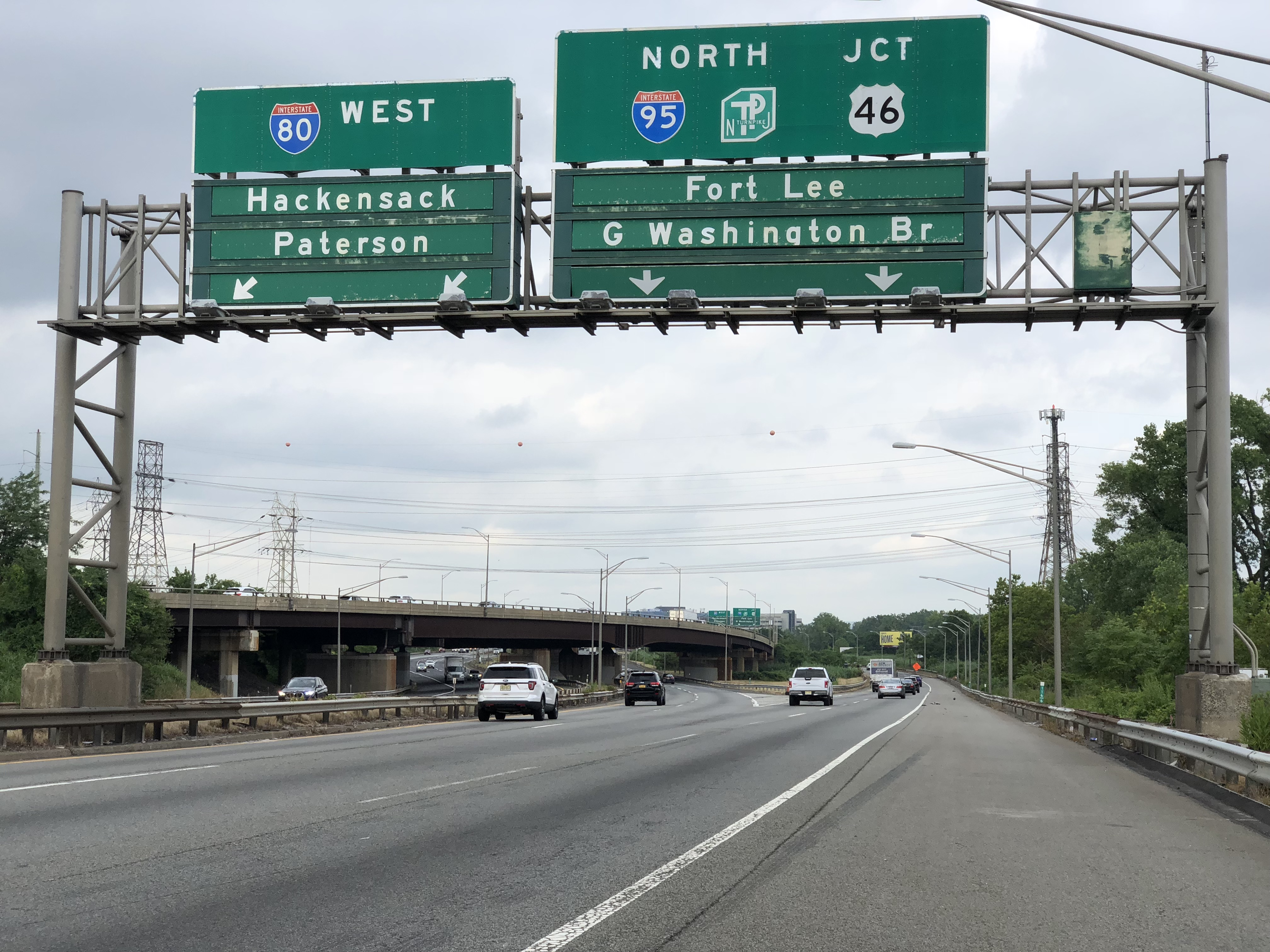
The northbound New Jersey Turnpike (I-95) in Ridgefield

As of May 2010, the borough had a total of 31.00 miles (49.89 km) of roadways, of which 21.10 miles (33.96 km) were maintained by the municipality, 3.45 miles (5.55 km) by Bergen County and 3.52 miles (5.66 km) by the New Jersey Department of Transportation and 2.93 miles (4.72 km) by the New Jersey Turnpike Authority.

The New Jersey Turnpike (I-95) passes through Ridgefield. The Turnpike's Vince Lombardi Service Area is located between Exits 18E/18W and the George Washington Bridge at mileposts 116E on the Eastern Spur and 115.5W on the Western Spur.

US 1/9, US 46, Route 63, Route 93 and Route 5 also pass through Ridgefield.

=== Public transportation ===
NJ Transit provides bus service to and from the Port Authority Bus Terminal in Midtown Manhattan on the 127, 154, 165, 166, 168 and the 321 (an 18-minute ride from the Vince Lombardi Park & Ride) routes and to Jersey City on the 83 route.

Original plans for the Hudson–Bergen Light Rail included a northern terminus at Vince Lombardi Park & Ride. Plans for an extension through the town called the Northern Branch Corridor Project call for a station in the borough along the Northern Branch right-of-way at Hendricks Parkway. The station at the park and ride is being studied as part of the Passaic–Bergen–Hudson Transit Project.

== Notable people ==
People who were born in, residents of, or otherwise closely associated with Ridgefield include:

- Tim Bogert (born 1944), bass guitarist and vocalist
- Brendan A. Burns (1895–1989), U.S. Army major general
- Marlene Caride (born 1963), politician who served in the New Jersey General Assembly from 2012 to 2018, where she represented the 36th Legislative District
- Louise DeSalvo (1942–2018), writer, editor, professor, and lecturer who was a renowned Virginia Woolf scholar
- Marcel Duchamp (1887–1968), French artist
- Ronald Enroth (1938–2023), Professor of Sociology at Westmont College
- Gilbert Gaul (1855–1919), painter and illustrator of military subjects ranging from the American Civil War to World War I, as well as American Western vistas and scenes
- Samuel Halpert (1884–1930), painter
- Thomas H. Herring (1812–1874), President of the New Jersey Senate in 1859 as well as the president of the Northern Railroad starting in 1859
- David Schenk Jacobus (1862–1955), mechanical engineer who served as president of the American Society of Mechanical Engineers in the year 1916–1917
- Frederick Krafft (1860–1933), socialist political activist and politician, who was convicted in 1918 for a violation of the Espionage Act and was the only person convicted under this law to receive a full executive pardon from President Woodrow Wilson
- Alfred Kreymborg (1883–1966), poet and novelist
- Joseph Lagana (born 1978), politician who has represented the 38th Legislative District in the New Jersey General Assembly since January 2014
- Chris Lema (born 1995), footballer who plays as a midfielder for New York Red Bulls II in the United Soccer League
- Man Ray (1890–1976), one of the most important painters and photographers of the Surrealist and Dada movements, had a house in an artists' colony that once existed in Ridgefield
- Judd Sergeant, contestant on the eleventh season of Survivor
- Bob Schroder (born 1944), MLB infielder who played for the San Francisco Giants
- Alexander Shaler (1827–1911), Union Army general in the American Civil War who later served as Mayor of Ridgefield, New Jersey
- Gregor Weiss (born 1941), artistic gymnast who represented the United States at the 1964 Summer Olympics, placing 7th in the team event
- Henry Wessel Jr. (1942–2018), photographer and educator
- William Carlos Williams (1883–1963), poet

== In popular culture ==
- Ridgefield is the setting for the 1998 Adam Sandler film (and subsequent 2006 musical) The Wedding Singer.

== See also ==
- List of U.S. cities with significant Korean-American populations

== Sources ==
- Municipal Incorporations of the State of New Jersey (according to Counties) prepared by the Division of Local Government, Department of the Treasury (New Jersey); December 1, 1958.
- Clayton, W. Woodford; and Nelson, William. History of Bergen and Passaic Counties, New Jersey, with Biographical Sketches of Many of its Pioneers and Prominent Men., Philadelphia: Everts and Peck, 1882.
- Harvey, Cornelius Burnham (ed.), Genealogical History of Hudson and Bergen Counties, New Jersey. New York: New Jersey Genealogical Publishing Co., 1900.
- Van Valen, James M. History of Bergen County, New Jersey. New York: New Jersey Publishing and Engraving Co., 1900.
- Westervelt, Frances A. (Frances Augusta), 1858–1942, History of Bergen County, New Jersey, 1630–1923, Lewis Historical Publishing Company, 1923.
