= Ann Brockman =

American painter

- Ann Brockman in 1940
- Born: Queen Ann Brockman; September 6, 1895; Alameda, California, US
- Died: March 29, 1943 (aged 47); New York City, US
- Resting place: Fresh Pond Crematory, Brooklyn

Ann Brockman (1895–1943) was an American artist who achieved success as a figurative painter following a successful career as an illustrator. Born in California, she spent her childhood in the American Far West and, upon marrying the artist William C. McNulty, relocated to Manhattan at the age of 18 in 1914. She took classes at the Art Students League where her teachers included two realist artists of the Ashcan School, George Luks and John Sloan. Her career as an illustrator began in 1919 with cover art for four issues of a fiction monthly called Live Stories. She continued providing cover art and illustrations for popular magazines and books until 1930 when she transitioned from illustrator to professional artist. From that year until her death in 1943, she took part regularly in group and solo exhibitions, receiving a growing amount of critical recognition and praise. In 1939 she told an interviewer that making money as an illustrator was so easy that it "almost spoiled [her] chances of ever being an artist." In reviewing a solo exhibition of her work in 1939, the artist and critic A.Z Kruse wrote: "She paints and composes with a thorough understanding of form and without the slightest hesitancy about anatomical structure. Add to this a magnificent sense of proportion, and impeccable feeling for color and an unmistakable knowledge of what it takes to balance the elements of good pictorial composition and you have a typical Ann Brockman canvas."

== Early life and training ==
Brockman was born in Northern California in 1895 and spent much of her youth in nearby Oregon, Washington, and Utah. She met the artist William C. McNulty in Seattle where he was employed as an editorial cartoonist. They married in March 1914 and promptly moved to Manhattan where he worked as a freelance illustrator. At the time of their marriage, Brockman was 18 years old. Over the next few years, her career generally followed that path that her husband had previously taken. His art training had been at the Art Students League beginning in 1908; she began her training there after moving to New York in 1914. After an early career as an editorial cartoonist, he freelanced as a magazine and book illustrator beginning in 1914; she began her career as a magazine and book illustrator in 1919. He embarked on a teaching career in the early 1930s and not long after, she began giving art instruction. While they both adhered to the realist tradition in art, their usual subjects were different. His prominently depicted urban cityscapes in the social realist whereas hers generally focused on rural landscapes. He was best known for his etchings and she for her oils and watercolors.

Brockman returned to the Art Students League in 1926 to take individual instruction for a month at a time from George Luks and John Sloan. Despite their help, one critic said McNulty's "sympathetic encouragement and guidance" was more important to her development as a professional artist.

== Career in art ==
In the course of her career as illustrator, Brockman would sometimes paint portraits of celebrities before drawing them, as for example in 1923 when she painted the French actress Andrée Lafayette who had traveled to New York to play title role in a film called Trilby. She would also sometimes accept commissions to make portrait paintings and in 1929 painted two Scottish terriers on one such commission. During this time, she also produced landscapes. In 1924 she displayed a New England village street scene painting in the Second Annual Exhibition of Paintings, Watercolors, and Drawings in the J. Wanamaker Gallery of Modern Decorative Art. Available sources show no further exhibitions until in 1930 a critic for the Boston Globe described one of her portraits as "well done" in a review of a Rockport Art Association exhibition held that summer.

Between 1931 and her death in 1943, Brockman participated in over thirty group exhibitions and five solos. (Note: The group shows included August 1930, Rockport Art Association, April 1931, Detroit Institute of Art, May 1931, Grand Central Galleries, New York, November 1931, San Francisco Society of Women Artists, April 1932, Society of Independent Artists, New York, September 1932, Macbeth Gallery, New York, November 1932, Gallery 144, New York, April 1933, Macbeth Gallery, June 1933, MacBeth Gallery, July 1933, Four Fountains Gallery, Southampton, Long Island, October 1933, Macbeth Gallery, July 1934, St. Louis City Art Museum, January 1935, Macbeth Gallery, April 1935, Corcoran Gallery, Washington, DC, July 1935, Macbeth Gallery, October 1935, Rhode Island School of Design, July 1936, Rockport Art Association, August 1936, Rockport Art Association, February 1937. Pennsylvania Academy of Fine Arts, June 1937, Art Institute of Chicago, July 1937, Kraushaar Galleries, New York, November 1937, Corcoran Gallery, 1938, Whitney Museum, January 1938, Associated American Artists, New York, July 1938, Rockport Contemporary Gallery, December 1939, Babcock Galleries, New York, November 1940, Art Institute of Chicago, August 1941, Rockport Art Association, 1942, Whitney Museum, January 1942, National Association of Women Artists, May 1942, Kleemann Gallery, New York, February 1943, Art Students League, April 1943, National Association of Women Artists. The solos were all held in the Kleemann Gallery (December 1935, March 1938, February 1940, January 1941, January 1942.) Her paintings appeared in shows of the artists' associations to which she belonged, including the Rockport Art Association, Salons of America, Society of Independent Artists, and National Association of Women Painters and Sculptors.Between 1932 and 1935, her paintings appeared frequently in New York's Macbeth Gallery. She won an award for a painting she showed at the Art Institute of Chicago in 1940. In 1942, the Whitney Museum bought one of the paintings she showed in its Biennial of that year. Critical praise for her work steadily increased during the decade that ended with her untimely death in 1943. In 1932, her painting called "The Camera Man" was called "a clever piece of illustration." Three years later, a painting called "Small Town" gave a critic "the impression of freshness, honesty, and skill". In 1938, a critic described her "Folly Cove" as "masterful" and said "Pigeon Hill Picnic" was "sustained by excellence of execution". At that time, Howard Devree of the New York Times saw "evidence of gathering powers" in her work and wrote "she imparts a dramatic feeling to landscape. She even manages this time to do trees touched by Autumn tints without calendar effect, which is no small praise." Three years later, a Times critic reported Brockman had "set herself a new high" in the watercolors she presented, and another critic said the gallery where she was showing had not "for some time" shown "so outstanding a solo exhibitor as Ann Brockman." Shortly before her death, a critic for Art News maintained that she was "one of America's most talented women painters".

After she had died, a critic said Brockman's paintings "displayed real power", adding that she was "highly rated among the nation's professional artists" and was known to give "aid and encouragement, always with a smile," both artists and to her students. in reviewing the memorial exhibition at the Kraushaar Galleries held in 1945, reviewers wrote about the strength and vibrancy of her personality, the quality of her painting ("every bit as good, possibly better than people had thought"), called her "one of the best of our twentieth century women painters", and credited "her sense of the vividness of life" as a contributor to "the unusual breadth that is so characteristic of her work. One noted that her work was "widely recognized throughout the country" and could be found in the collections of prominent museums, including the Metropolitan Museum of Art, the Whitney Museum of American Art, and the Art Institute of Chicago. Writing in the Times, Devree wrote, "even those who had followed the steady growth of this artist for more than a decade, each successive show being at once an evidence of new achievement and an augury of still better work to come, may well be surprised at the combined impact of the selected paintings in the present showing," and writing in the Brooklyn Daily Eagle, A.Z Kruse said she had made "extraorginary accomplishments", painted with "inordinate distinction" showing a "lyrical majesty," and possessed "a keen esthetic sense which did not deviate from truth."

=== Artistic style ===
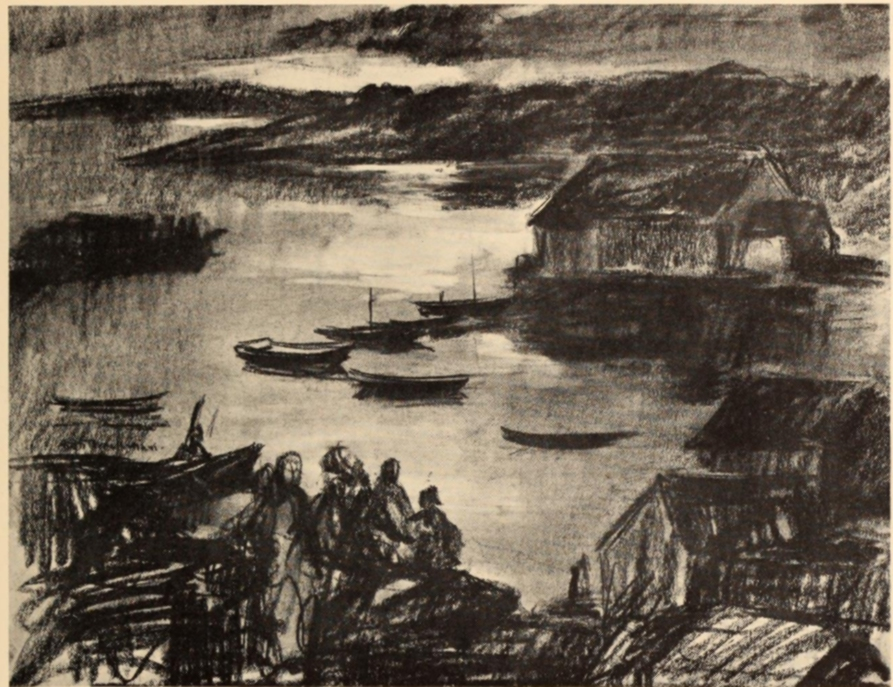
(1) Ann Brockman, undated drawing, black chalk on paper, 18 x 22 inches

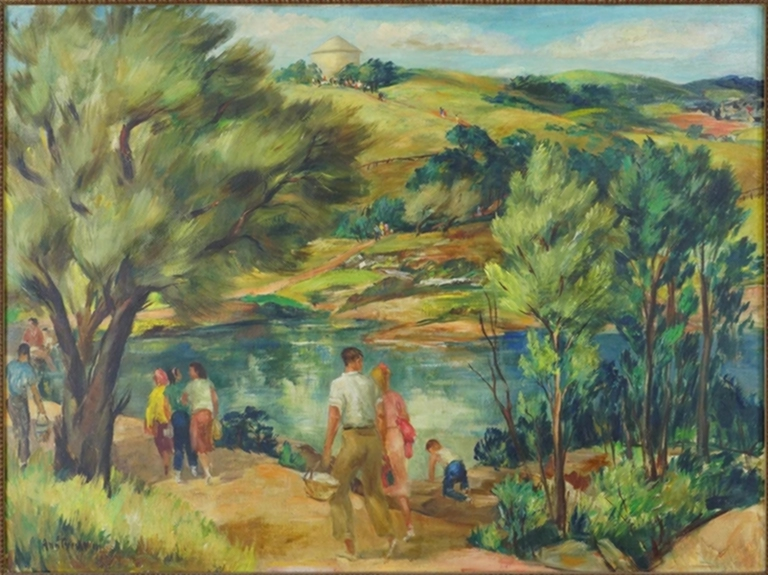
(2) Ann Brockman, High School Picnic, about 1935, oil on canvas, 34 1/4 x 44 1/4 inches

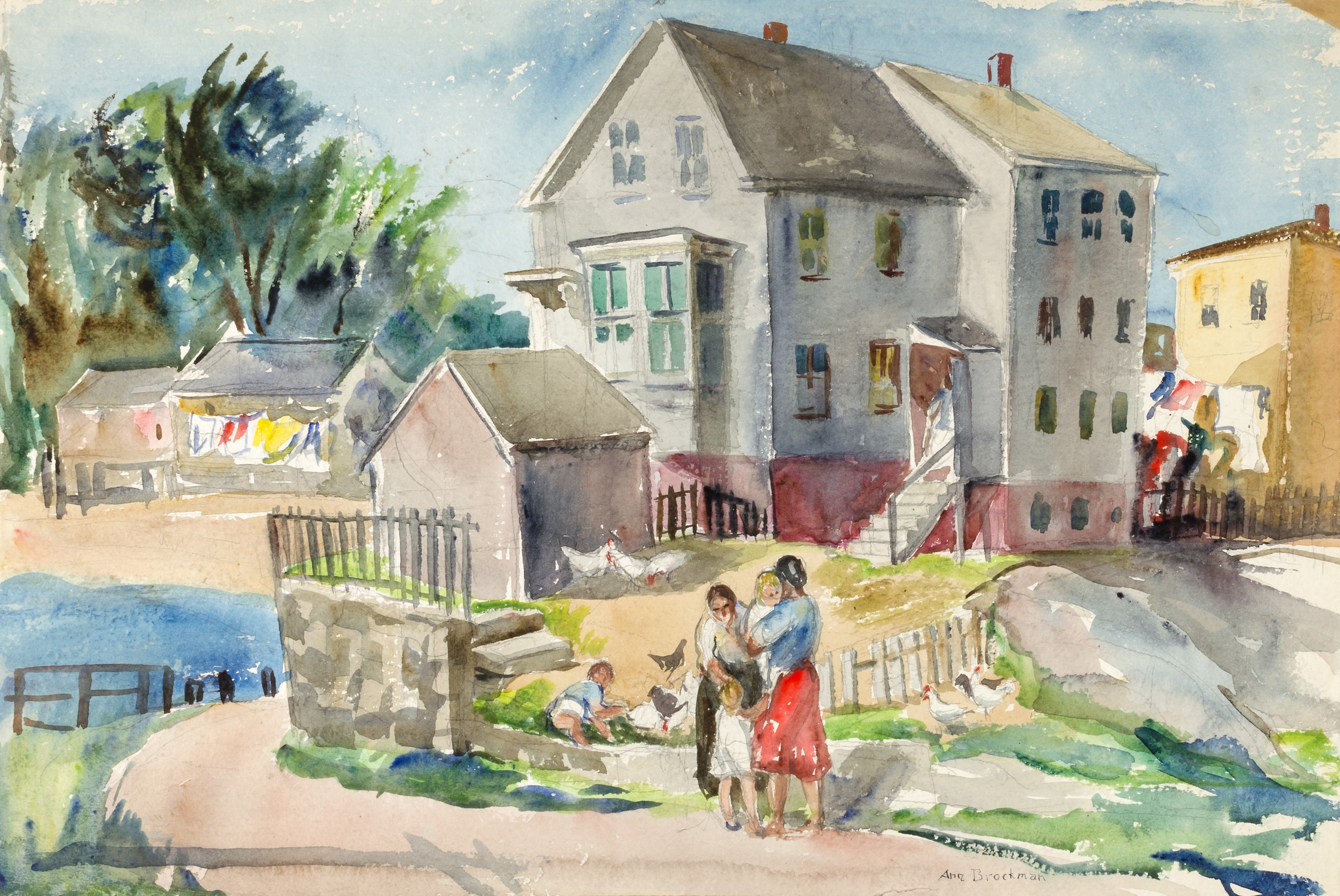
(3) Ann Brockman, untitled landscape, about 1943, watercolor and pencil on paper, 15 1/4 x 22 1/2 inches

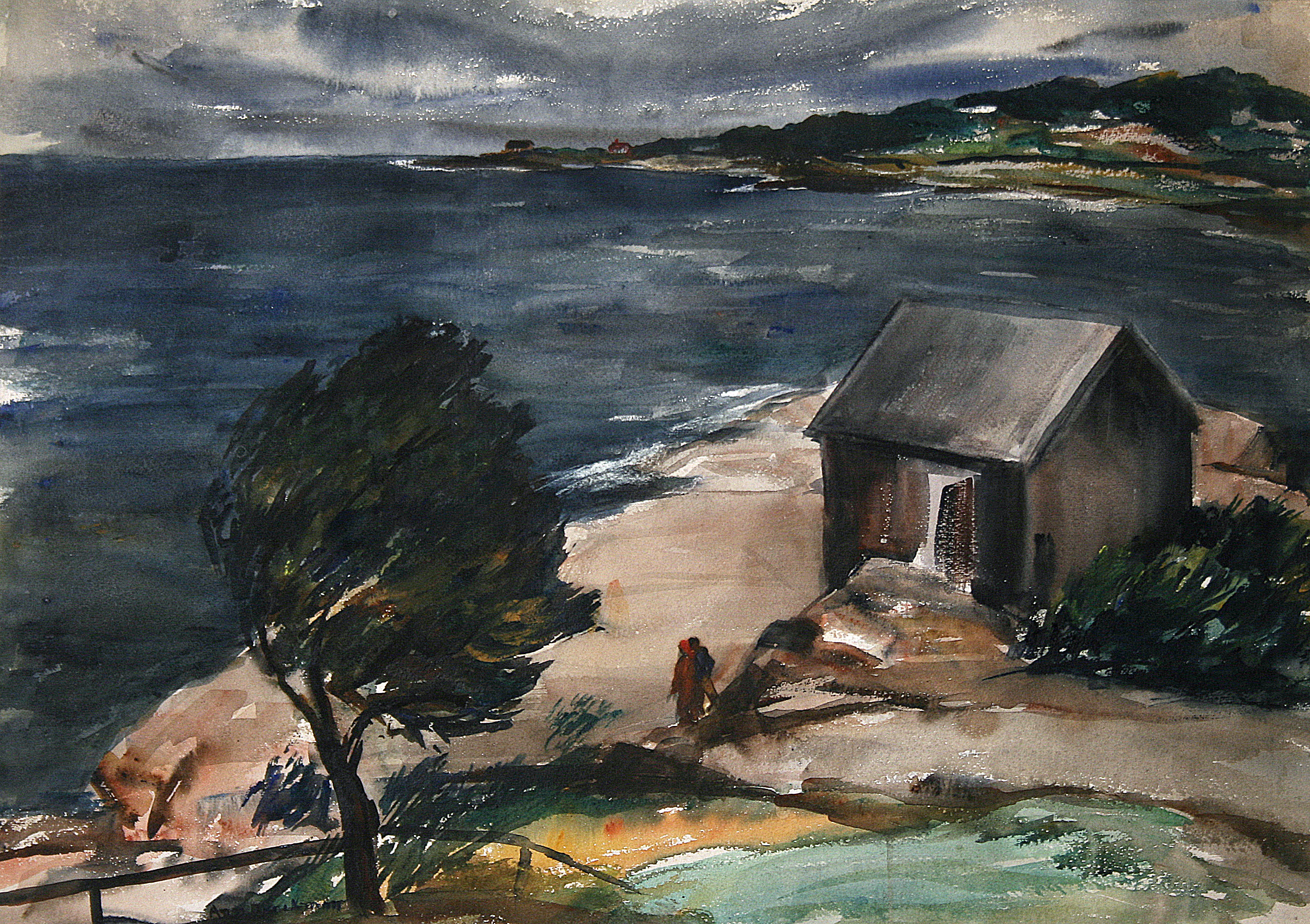
(4) Ann Brockman, North Coast, undated watercolor, 21 1/2 x 30 inches

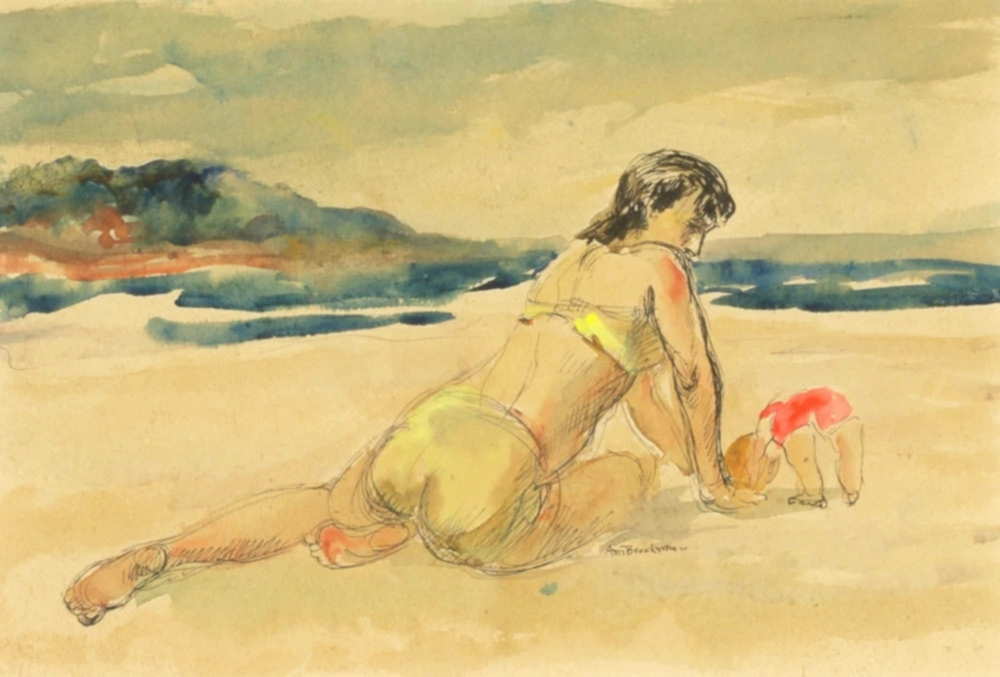
(5) Ann Brockman, On the Beach, 1942, watercolor on paper, 16 1/2 x 20 inches

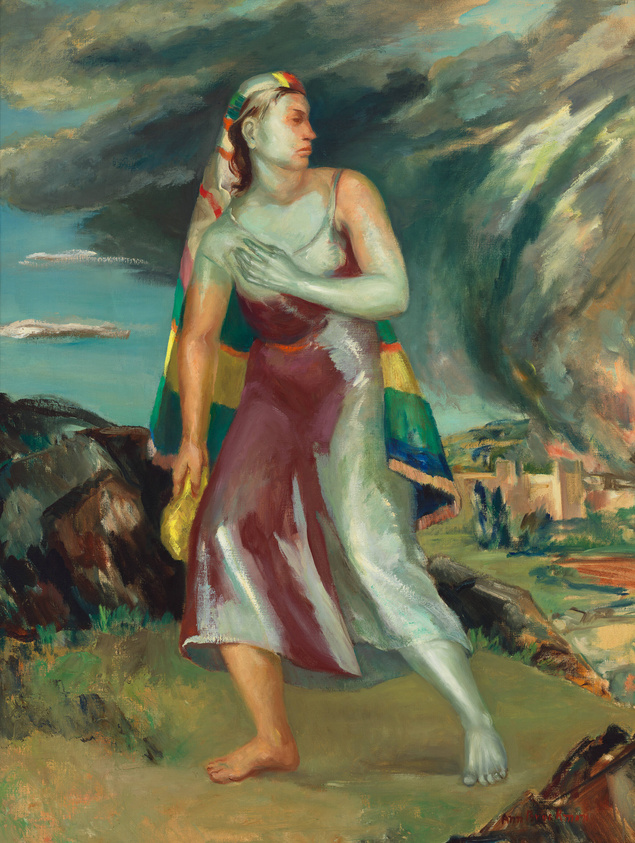
(6) Ann Brockman, Lot's Wife, 1942, oil on canvas, 46 x 35 inches

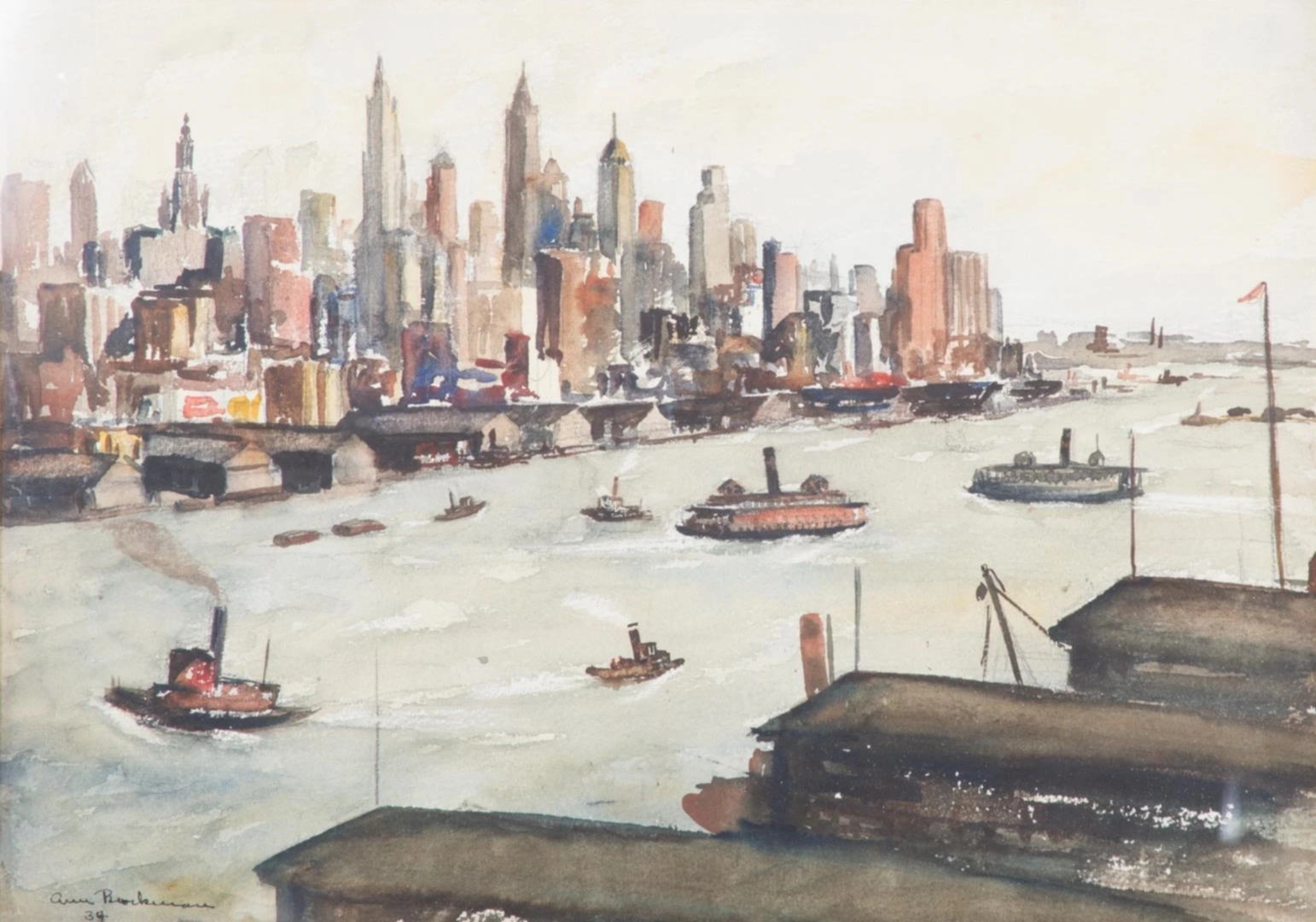
(7) Ann Brockman, New York Harbor, 1934, watercolor on paper, 13 1/2 x 19 1/4 inches

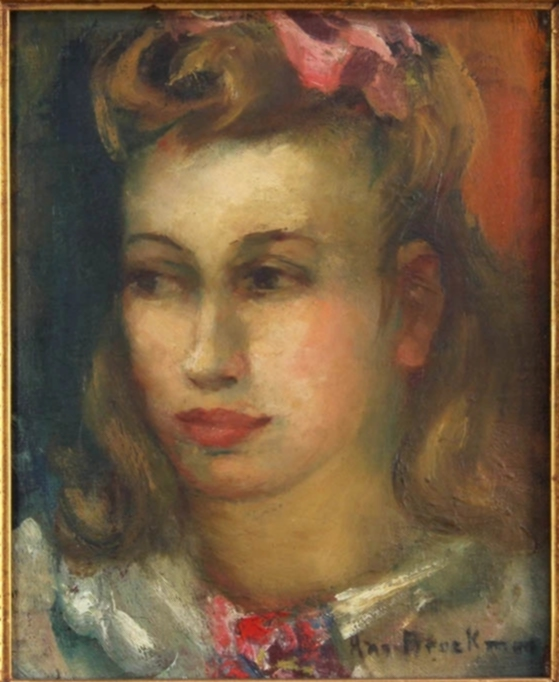
(8) Ann Brockman, Youth, 1942, oil on board, 13 1/2 x 11 1/2 inches

Brockman was a figurative painter whose main subjects were rural landscapes and small-town and coastal scenes. She worked in oils and watercolors, becoming better known for the latter late in her career. Most of her paintings were relatively small. Although she made figure pieces infrequently, the nudes and circus and Biblical scenes she painted were seen to be among her best works. In 1938, Howard Devree wrote: "Her gray-day marines and coast scenes are familiar to gallery goers and are favorites with her fellow artists. Her figure pieces have attained a sculptural quality without losing warmth or taking on stiffness. One spirited circus incident of equestriennes about to enter the big tent compares not unfavorably with many of the similar pictures by a long line of painters who have been fascinated by the theme. She imparts a dramatic feeling to landscape. She even manages this time to do trees touched by Autumn tints without calendar effect, which is no small praise." Similarly, a critic for Art Digest wrote that year: "Fluently and virilely painted, [her] canvases suggest a close affinity between nature and humans. The artist takes her subjects out in the open where they may picnic or bathe with space and air about them. A fast tempo is felt in the compositions of restless horses and nimble entertainers busily alert for the coming performance. Miss Brockman is also interested in portraying frightened groups of people, hurrying to safety or standing half-clad in the lowering storm light."

Her palette ranged from vivid colors in bright sunlight to somber ones in the overcast skies of stormy weather. Of the former, one critic spoke of the rich colors and "sun-drenched rocks" of her coastal scenes and another of her "summery landscapes of coves and picnics." Of the latter, Howard Devree said she "painted so many moody Maine coast vignettes of lowering skies and uneasy seas that artists have been heard to refer to an effect as 'an Ann Brockman day'".

Brockman's handling of Biblical subjects can be seen in the oil called "Lot's Wife", shown above, Image No. 6. Her watercolor called "On the Beach" and her oil portrait called "Youth" may both indicate the "sculptural quality" that Devree said was typical of her figure pieces (Image No. 8, above).

An example of Brockman's bright palette in a typical summer theme is the oil painting called "High School Picnic" shown above, Image No. 2. Next to it is a painting, an untitled landscape of about 1943 whose medium, watercolor on paper, shows off the sunny palette she often used (Image No. 3).

Among the darkest of her works was an untitled 1942 drawing she made in black chalk (shown above, Image No. 1). In a book called Drawings by American Artists (1947), the artist and art editor Norman Kent noted that this study influenced her painting through its use of "forms" that were "elastic" and suggested "color". He said its "massing of dark and light" created "a definite mood" that was "impressionistic" and had "the strength of a man's work". Brockman's undated watercolor called "North Coast" (shown above, Image No. 4) is an example of the paintings to which Kent referred.

== Illustrator ==
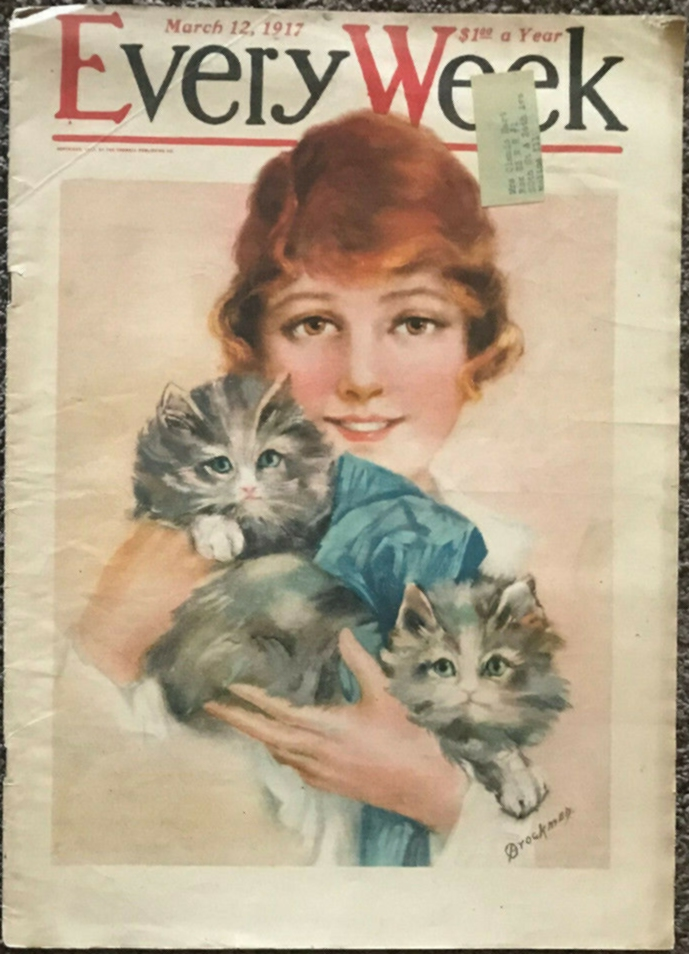
(9) Ann Brockman, cover, March 12, 1917, Every Week magazine

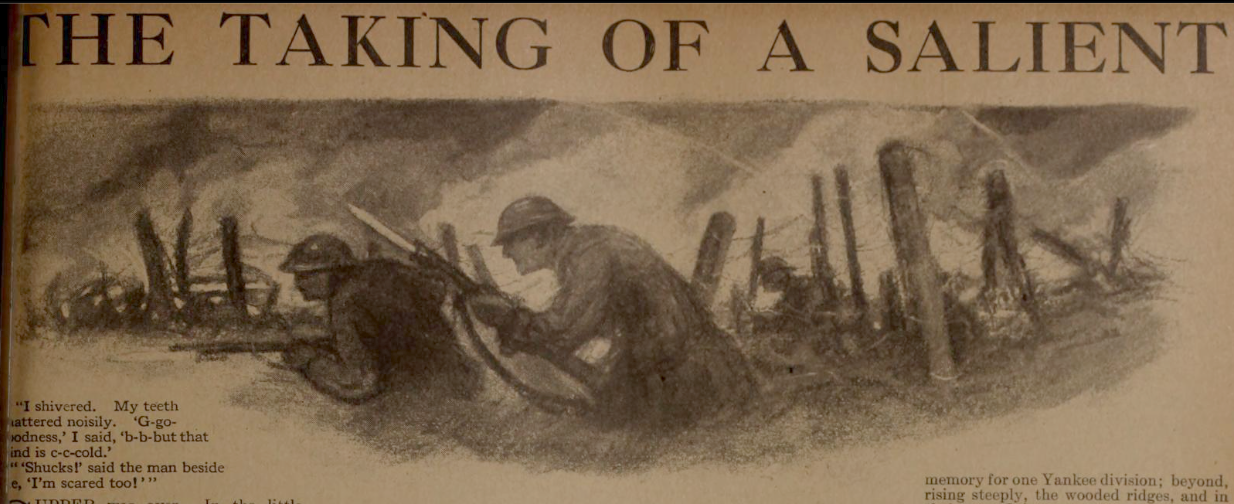
(10) Illustration of an article, "The Taking of a Salient" by Henry Russell Miller, Illustrated by Ann Brockman in Christian Herald magazine, April 5, 1919

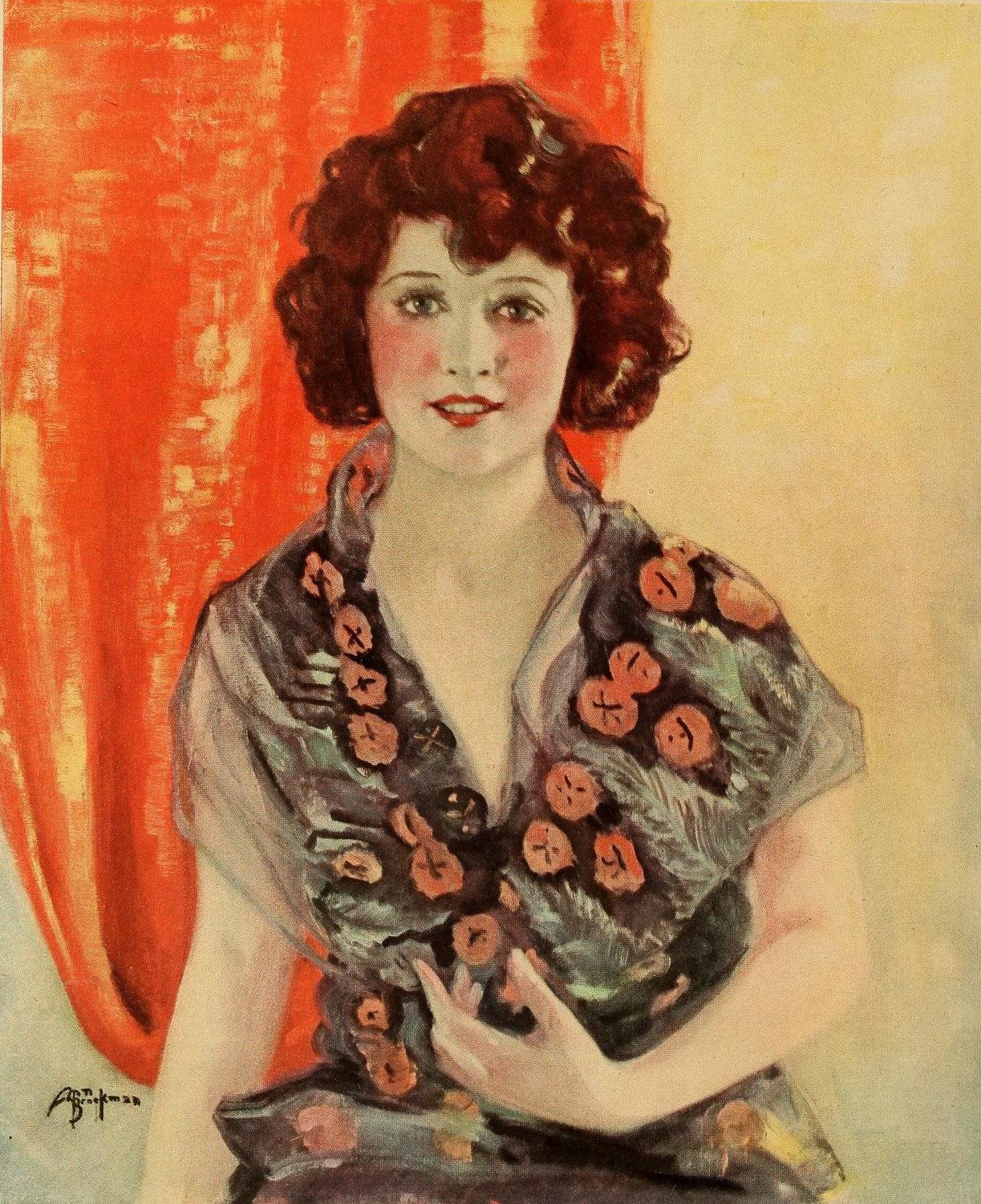
(11) Ann Brockman, cover, September 1922, Shadowland magazine, portrait of Betty Compson

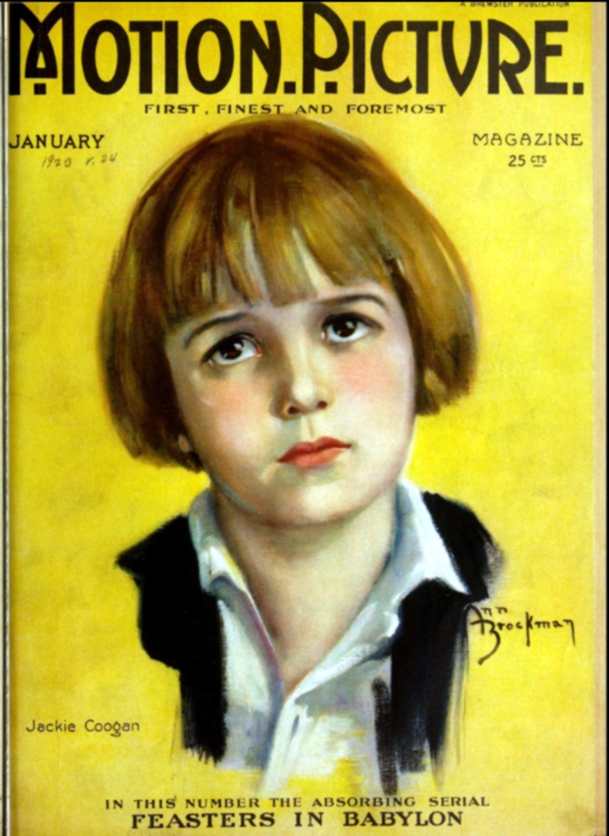
(12) Ann Brockman, cover, Motion Picture Magazine Fall-Winter 1922,

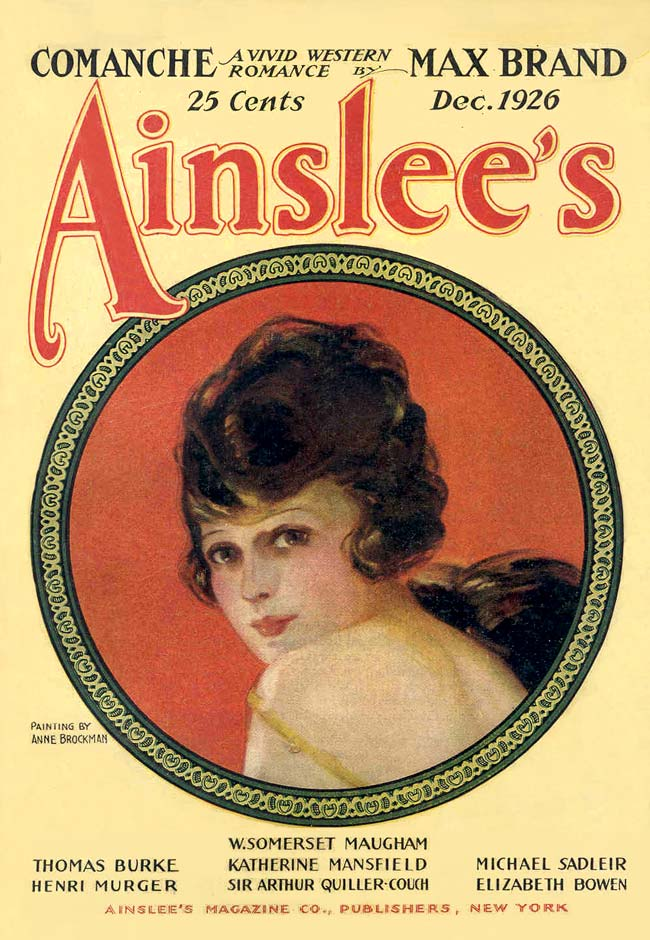
(13) Ann Brockman, cover, Ainslee's magazine, December 1926

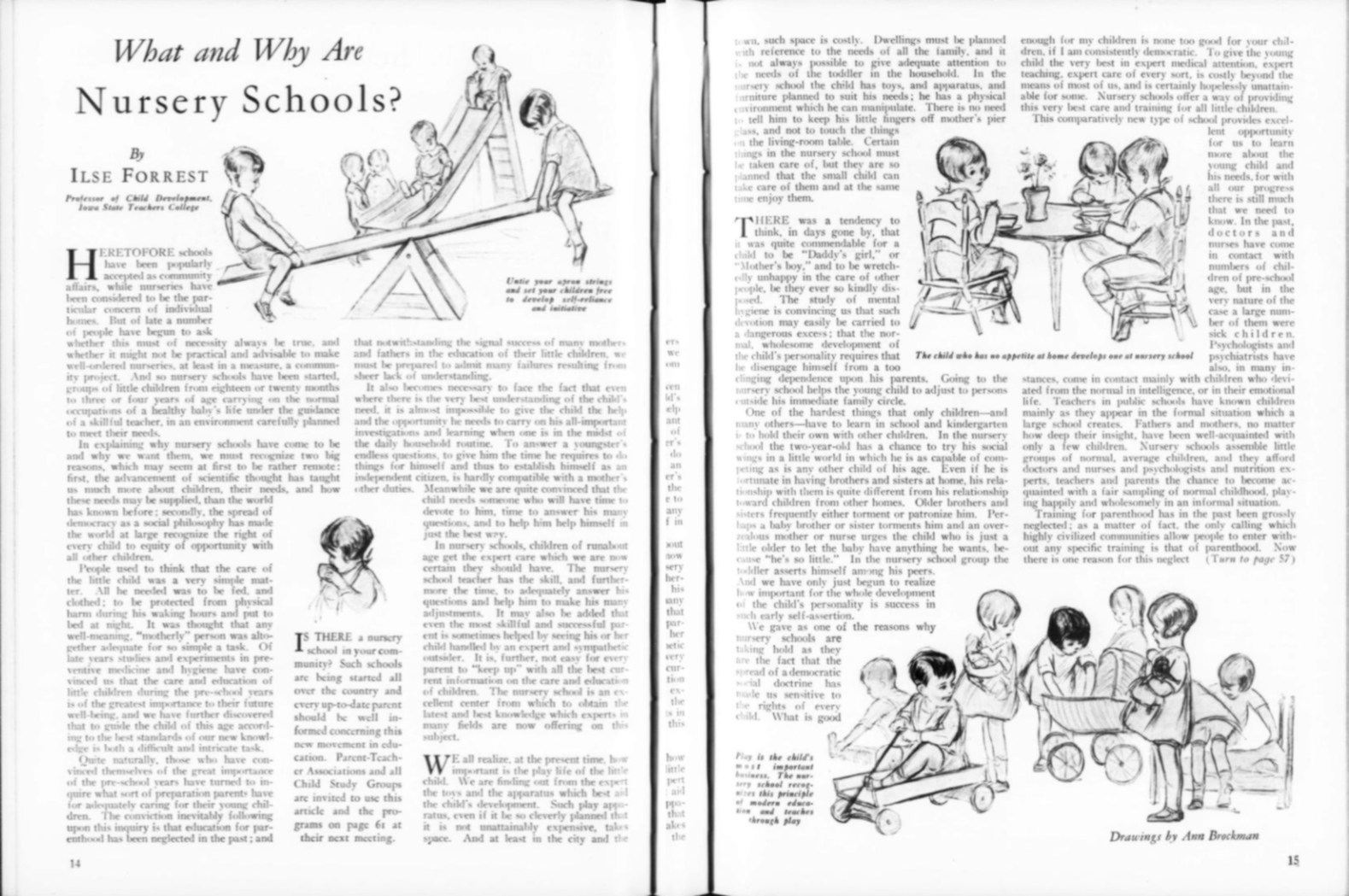
(14) Ann Brockman, illustrations for "What and Why Are Nursery Schools", Parents' Magazine, September 1928

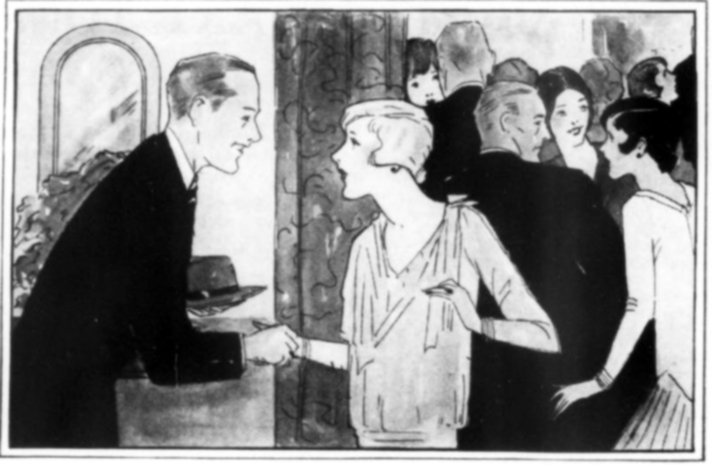
(15) Ann Brockman, illustration for "Party Times Are Coming", by Mabel Claire, Smart Set magazine, October 1929

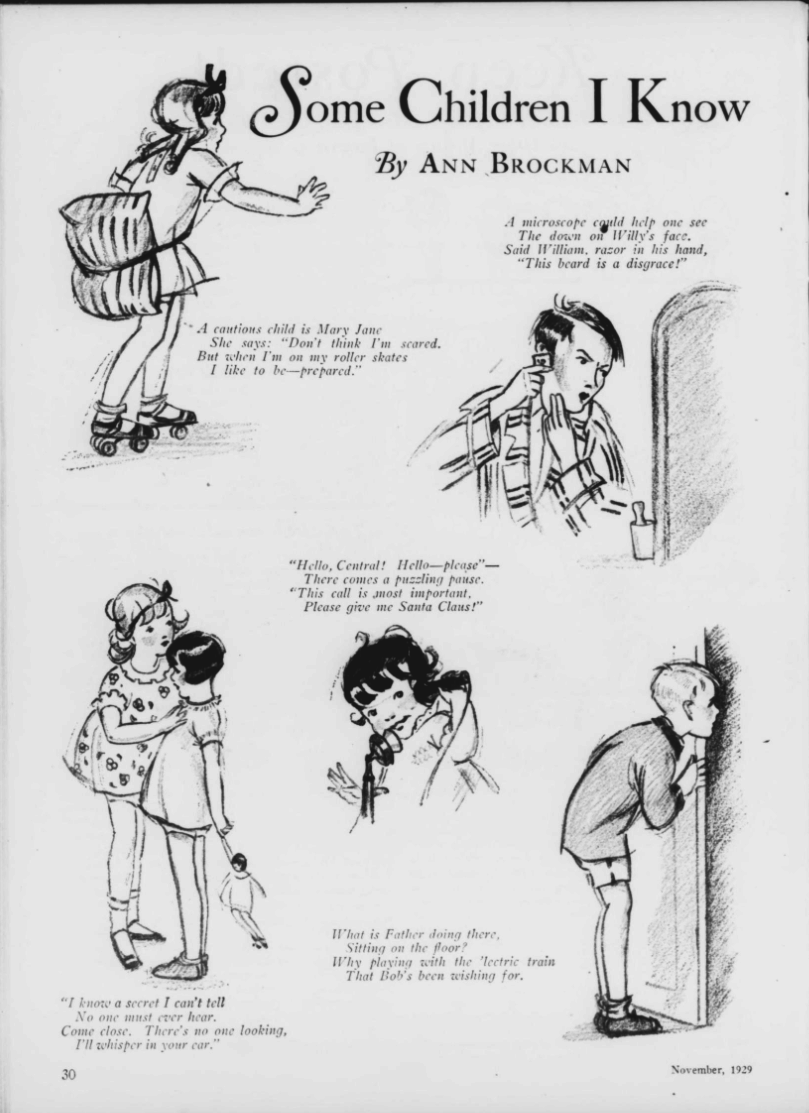
(16) Ann Brockman, author and illustrator, "Some Children I Know", Parents' Magazine, November 1929

Throughout her career as an illustrator, Brockman made more than twenty-five covers for popular magazines (Note: Brockman's cover illustrations included: 1917-03 Every Week, 1919-04 Live Stories, 1919-06 Smith’s Magazine, 1919-11 Live Stories, 1922-01 Picture-Play, 1922-06 Picture-Play, 1922-07 Picture-Play, 1922-09 Motion Picture, 1922-09 Picture-Play, 1922 Fall-Winter Motion Picture, 1922-11 Picture-Play, 1922-09 Shadowland, 1923-02 Motion Picture, 1923-03 Motion Picture, 1924-01 Christian Herald, 1926-08 The American Girl, 1926-10 Parents' Magazine, 1926-11 Parents' Magazine, 1926-12 Parents' Magazine, 1926-12 Ainslee’s, 1927-02 Parents' Magazine, 1927-02 The American Girl, 1927-03 The American Girl, 1927-06 Parents' Magazine, 1927-09 Parents' Magazine, 1927-12 The American Girl, 1928-03 Parents' Magazine, 1928-11 The American Girl, 1930-07 Parents' Magazine. Sources) and nearly as many illustrations for articles, stories, and ads. (Note: Brockman's illustrations for fiction, articles, and ads included: 1919-04 Christian Herald, 1921-06 Christian Herald, 1923-03 motion picture ad, 1925-07 Saturday Evening Post, 1927-01 Parents' Magazine, 1927-10 Parents' Magazine, 1928-01 Parents' Magazine, 1928-09 Parents' Magazine, 1929-05 The Smart Set, 1929-07 Parents' Magazine, 1929-07 The Smart Set, 1929-08 The Smart Set, 1929-09 The Smart Set, 1929-10 The Smart Set, 1929-11 The Smart Set, 1929-11 Parents' Magazine, 1929-12 The Smart Set, 1930-02 The Smart Set, 1930-03 The Smart Set, 1930-08 Good Housekeeping. Sources 1929-06 1929-07 1929-08 1929-09 1929-10 1929-11 1929-12 1930-02 1930-03 last one) She also contributed illustrations for children's books. These included The Harrison Children; a Story for Girls and Boys, by Otto M. and Mabel S. Becker (frontispiece by Ann Brockman, Garden City, N. Y., Doubleday Page & Company, 1927), We five, by Edna Osborne Whitcomb (illustrated by Ann Brockman, Garden City, N. Y., Doubleclay, Doran & Company, 1928), Betty and Jack; a Primer, by A. C. Lisson and Evelyn V. Thonet (illustrated by Ann Brockman, F. A. Owen, Dansville, N. Y. 1930) Helen and Bob; a First Reader, by Albert C. Lisson, Evelyn V. Thomet (illustrated by Ann Brockman, F. A. Owen, Dansville, N. Y. 1930) The house in Hidden lane, Two Mysteries for Younger Girls, by Augusta Huiell Seaman (illustrated by Ann Brockman, Garden City, N. Y., Doubleday, Doran & company, 1931).

One of Brockman's first covers appeared in the March 12, 1917 issue of a short-lived Sunday magazine called Every Week (see Image No. 9, above). Many of the covers showed screen actors, including French actress Andrée Lafayette, the Talmadge sisters, Constance and Norma, Alice Terry, Claire Windsor, and Betty Compson (see Image No. 11, above). Her cover of Jackie Coogan is shown above, Image No. 12. In 1926, she drew the cover for the final issue of a literary periodical called' Ainslee's Magazine that had become known for publishing writers such as Stephen Crane, Edna St. Vincent Millay, Bret Harte, and Dorothy Parker (see Image No. 13, above). One of her first story illustrations appeared in the issue for a news weekly called the Christian Herald. The piece was a fictionalized account of one of the last battle fought by American forces during World War I (see Image No. 10, above). Throughout the 1920s, Brockman illustrated articles for Parents magazine and for American Girl, the monthly magazine of the Girl Scouts. Many of Brockman's illustrations accompanied stories that had female protagonists. Drawings in the December 1927 issue of American Girl, entitled "What Is the Matter with Mary Jane?" is full of slangy teenage dialogue among members of a Girl Scout troop who get help from a visiting and very posh Girl Guide from England in making last-minute preparations for a Christmas entertainment. Brockman illustrations for nonfiction articles often focused on the evolving role of women as homemakers and parents. By the end of the 1920s, a confluence of what one writer called "the emancipation of women and the spirit of scientific inquiry" had produced what the writer called "a body of knowledge by which the modern woman" could "realize her capacity for initiative and management". Newspapers and magazines of the period discussed the implication of this dramatic shift in the role of women as wives and mothers. An article that Brockman illustrated in 1928 in Parents Magazine was of this type. Called " What and Why Are Nursery Schools", it discussed the benefits of preschools for parents and their children (see Image No. 14, above).

In 1919, Jack Bechdolt and his wife Mabel took rooms in the townhouse that Brockman and her husband had rented in the Chelsea neighborhood of Manhattan. Bechdolt was a newsman, short story writer, and illustrator. His wife was a sculptor, businesswoman, and author. On the publication of her first book, The Busy Woman's Cook Book of Cooking by the Clock, she told an interviewer she taught herself to be an efficient cook because she could not otherwise keep house for herself and her husband while still maintaining her busy schedule as artist and maker of small gifts and exotic candles. When her success at efficient kitchen management became apparent, her friends and acquaintances urged her to write an instruction book on the subject. The book was a success, leading her to drop sculpting and crafts work and devote herself to writing. By 1929, she had achieved success as an author of self-help guides for young wives. In that year, she began writing regular articles in a monthly literary magazine called The Smart Set for which Brockman prepared illustrations. The first few were headed "The Busy Woman Cooks". In addition to recipes, the articles treated all aspects of meal preparation and such matters as the efficient hosting of social events. Titles included "Party Times Are Coming", "Picnicking Made Easy", "A Sixty Minute Menu For a Holiday Dinner", and "You'll Get Your Man" (see Image No. 15, above).

Brockman wrote short poems to accompany a page of illustrations in the November 1929 issue of Parents' Magazine (see image No. 16, above).

== Art instructor ==
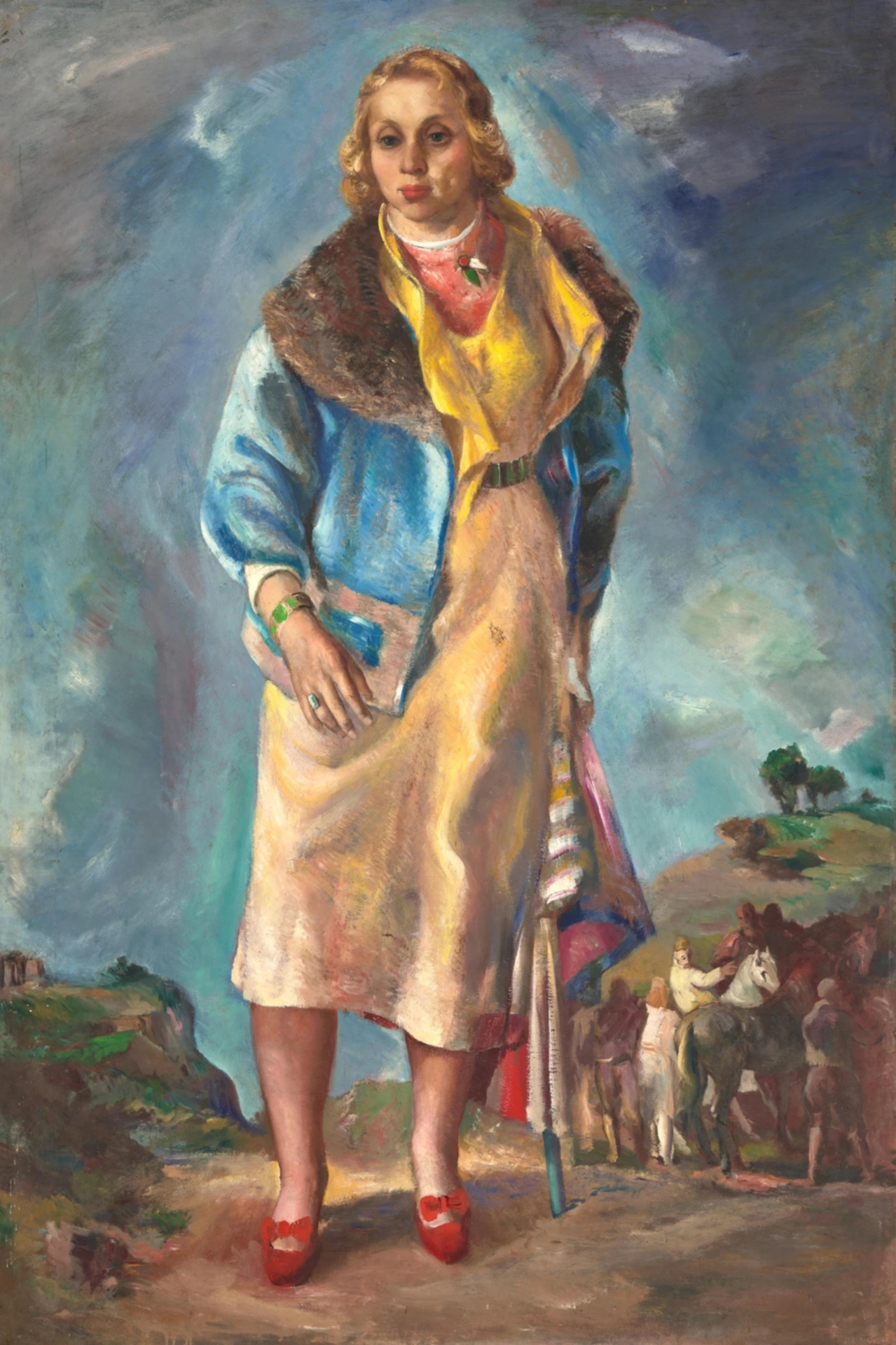
Jon Corbino, Portrait of Ann Brockman, about 1938, oil on masonite, 72 In x 48

inches 1931, Brockman's husband William C. McNulty began teaching a class with live models at the Art Students League. Over the next ten years or so, she would occasionally take over instruction when he was ill or otherwise unavailable. In 1926, the couple began spending the warm months in a place called Bearskin Neck on the Massachusetts coast. In 1938, they began a small summer school there that they called the "Cape Ann Art School". An Italian-born painter named Jon Corbino joined with McNulty and Brockman to teach the school's students and in its issue for June 13, 1938 Life magazine printed an article on Corbino at Bearskin Neck. One of its photos showed him in his studio in front of a portrait of Brockman he had made.

== Personal life and family ==
Brockman's death certificate records her birth date as September 6, 1895. Other sources give her birth year as 1896, 1899, and 1900. Most sources give her maiden name and the name she used professionally as Ann Brockman. Her marriage certificate gives Queen Anne Brockman as her name. Early census reports give her given name as Queenie or Queene. Her given name was also recorded as Anna or Anne.

Brockman's father was a traveling salesman named Harry G. Brockman. Her mother was Lillian Fliedner Brockman. Her mother and father divorced sometime before 1910 and in that year Brockman and her mother were living apart from her father and her mother apparently ran a costume shop to support the two of them. Late in life, her mother's mental health deteriorated and she was a patient in a Seattle mental institution from 1939 until she died in 1947.

Brockman was eighteen years old and living in Seattle when she married William Charles McNulty, who was then a newspaper cartoonist in that city. Soon after the wedding, the couple moved to New York and in 1917 began renting a townhouse in the Chelsea neighborhood of Manhattan, which would be her principal residence for the rest of her life.

The lives of Brockman and McNulty showed similarities to the lives of Mabel Claire and William C. Bechdolt. All four were born within a few years of each other. Both marriages took place in Seattle. Both husbands worked for newspapers. Three of the four studied at the Art Students League. Claire and Bechdolt rented rooms from Brockman and McNulty during the 1920s.

Brockman became ill in 1941. After a long decline in health, she died in the Park East Hospital in Manhattan on March 29, 1943. Her remains were cremated and buried in Fresh Pond Crematory, Brooklyn.

Following her death, news reports brought attention to her personality, which one said had been "warm and vital". Another said: "As so many still remember, Ann Brockman had great personal qualities generosity, graciousness, à sense of the vividness of life, and above all, enduring courage. Perhaps it was this fulfillment of personality that contributed to the unusual breadth that is so characteristic of her work. Another said the force of her personality had made it difficult to make objective evaluations of her work, "so strong and vibrant was her personality." Another note that "she offered aid and encouragement, always with a smile, to fellow artist-contemporaries as well as students. Her untimely death brings sorrow to all who knew her, and they were legion."
