= 404 West 20th Street =

Townhouse in Manhattan, New York

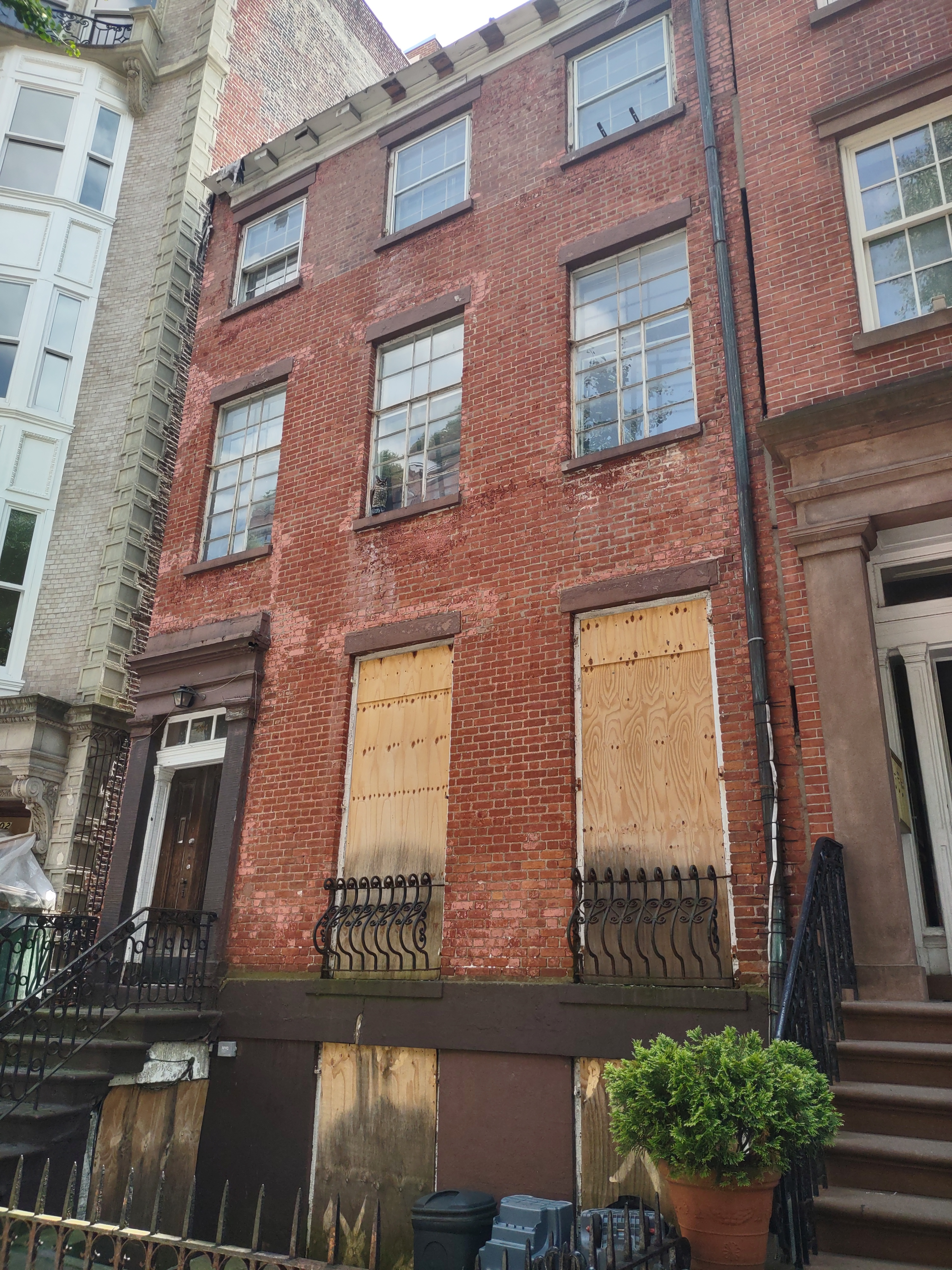
- Interactive map of the 404 West 20th Street area
- Alternative names: Walker House

General information
- Type: Frame structure with brick front
- Location: Manhattan, New York City, United States
- Coordinates: 40°44′40″N 74°0′12″W
- Construction started: 1829
- Opened: 1830

Technical details
- Floor count: 2.5

Design and construction
- Known for: Oldest surviving house in the Chelsea neighborhood

404 West 20th Street is a historic building in Manhattan, New York City. Built between 1829 and 1830, it is the oldest house in the city's Chelsea neighborhood. It is a frame structure with a facade of red Flemish bond brick. Originally designed in Federal style, it was later modified to conform to the Greek-revival style of neighboring houses. Often called by its street address, it is also called the Walker House after its first owner, Hugh Walker.

As a structure within the bounds of the Chelsea Historic District, the building's historic integrity is protected by the New York City Landmarks Preservation Commission. Throughout the twentieth century and into the twenty-first it remained much as it had been in the nineteenth. In 2016, however, a new owner proposed to greatly enlarge the building and to fill in the small alley between it and its neighbor to the east. The Preservation Commission approved the proposal, noting that the building's appearance when viewed from the street would not be substantially altered. Although neighborhood groups, including the city-founded representative Manhattan Community Board 4, vociferously disagreed, the commission stood by its decision in 2016 and reiterated its approval in 2022. The new owner has made no effort to effect the proposed changes, however, and the building remains vacant and in disrepair.

== History of the site ==
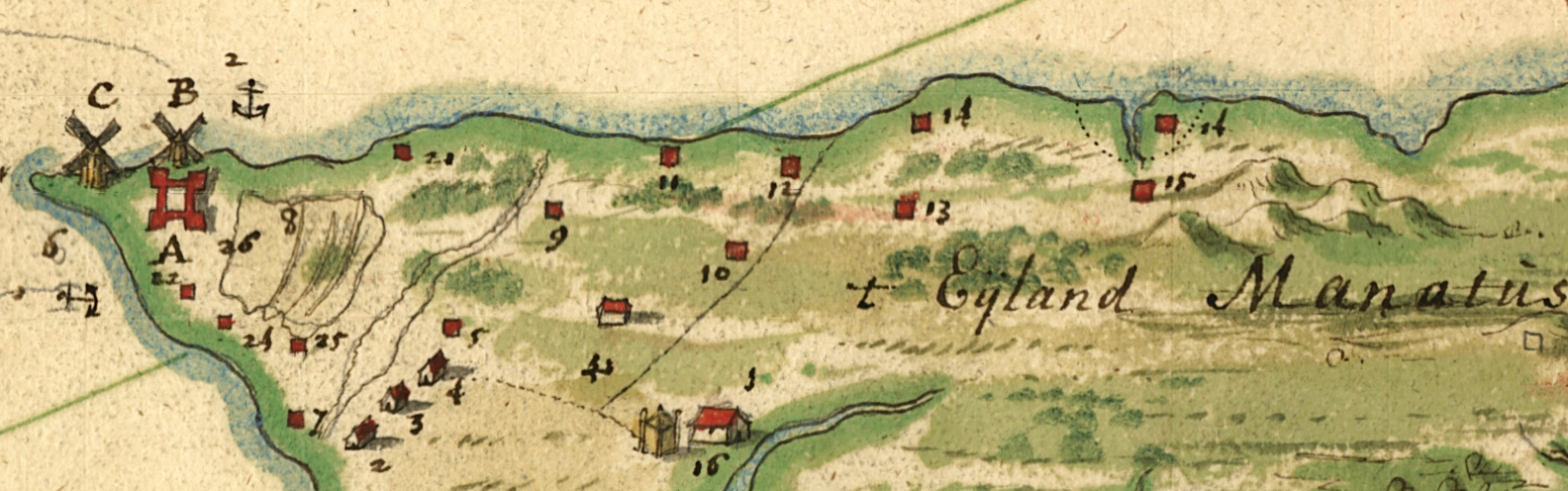
(1) Detail showing lower Manhattan in 1639 taken from a map by Joan Vinckeboons called "Manatvs gelegen op de Noot Riuier" (18 x 26.5 inches, pen and watercolor, held by the Geography and Map Division of the Library of Congress)

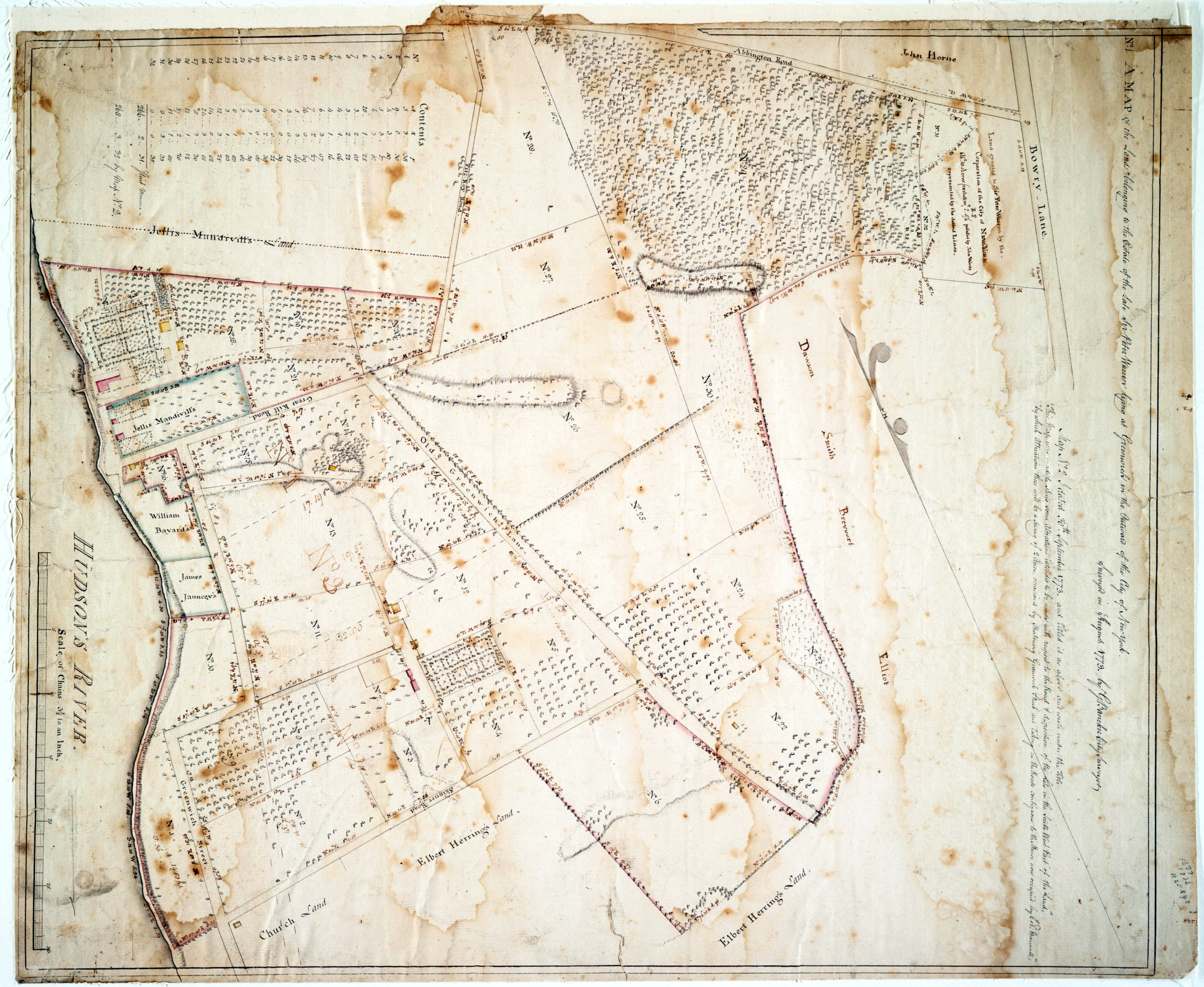
(2) Detail showing the Mandeville Farm in 1773 taken from a map by Gerard Bancker called "A map of the lands belonging to the estate of the late Sir Peter Warren lying at Greenwich in the outward of the city of New York" (26 x 10 inches, pen and ink, held by the New York Public Library)

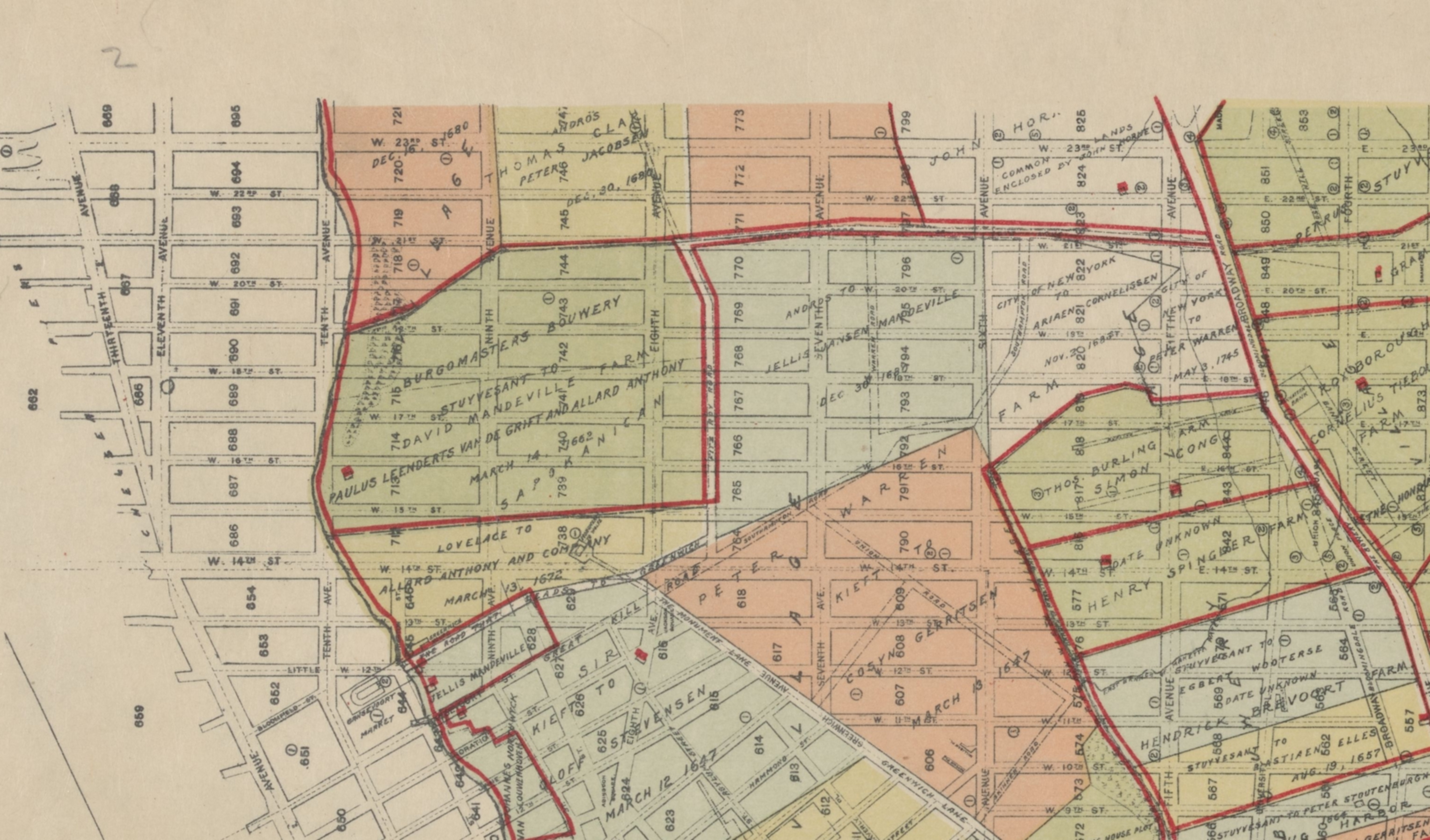
(3) Detail showing the Mandeville Farm in Blocks 713–717 overlaid on the modern grid of city streets, taken from a map by Jennie Macarthy called "Map of the Dutch Grants" found in The Iconography of Manhattan Island, 1498–1909 by Isaac Newton Phelps Stokes (vol. 6, following p. 64i, plates 84B-a-g, Robert H. Dodd, publisher, 1928)

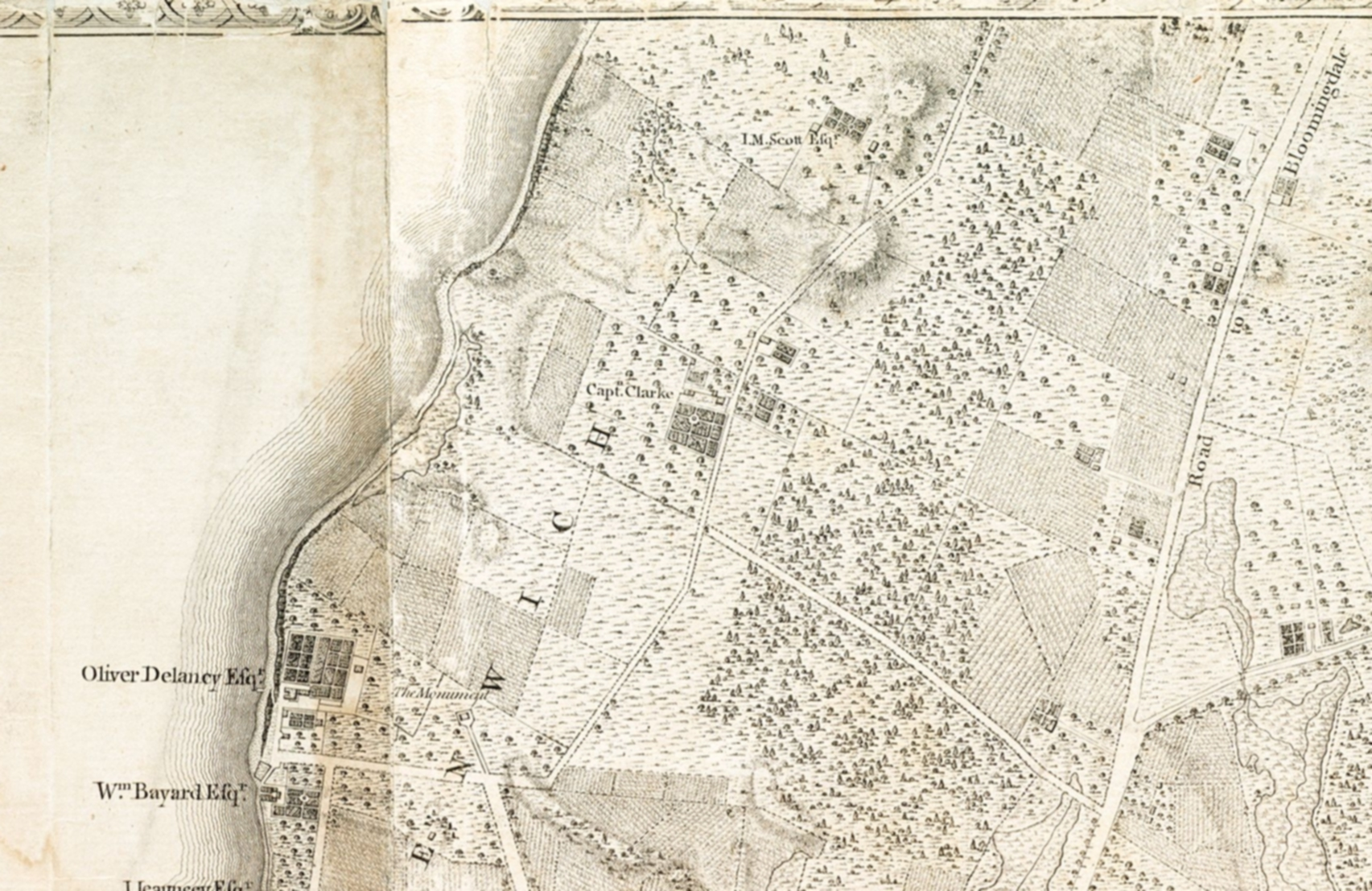
(4) Detail showing the Clarke estate and adjacent land taken from a map by Bernard Ratzer called "Plan of the city of New York in North America" (1776, Jefferys & Faden, London)

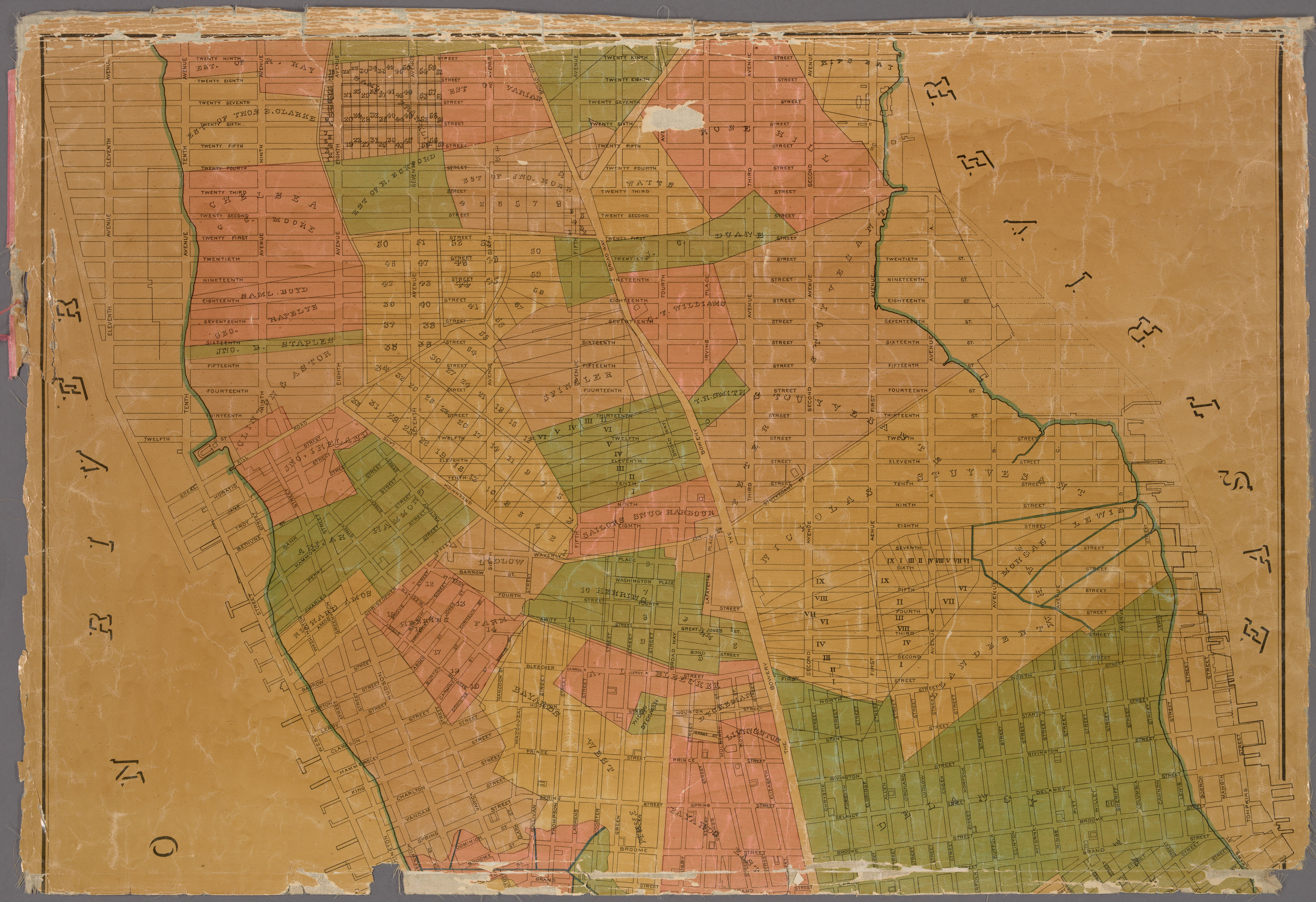
(5) Detail showing the property inherited by C.C. Moore (upper right (northwest) taken from a map by Edwin Smith called "Map of New York City from Battery to 29th Street, Showing Farm Lines & Boundaries as Originally Granted" (28 x 45.5 inches, 1891, J. McIntyre Smith, publisher, New York)

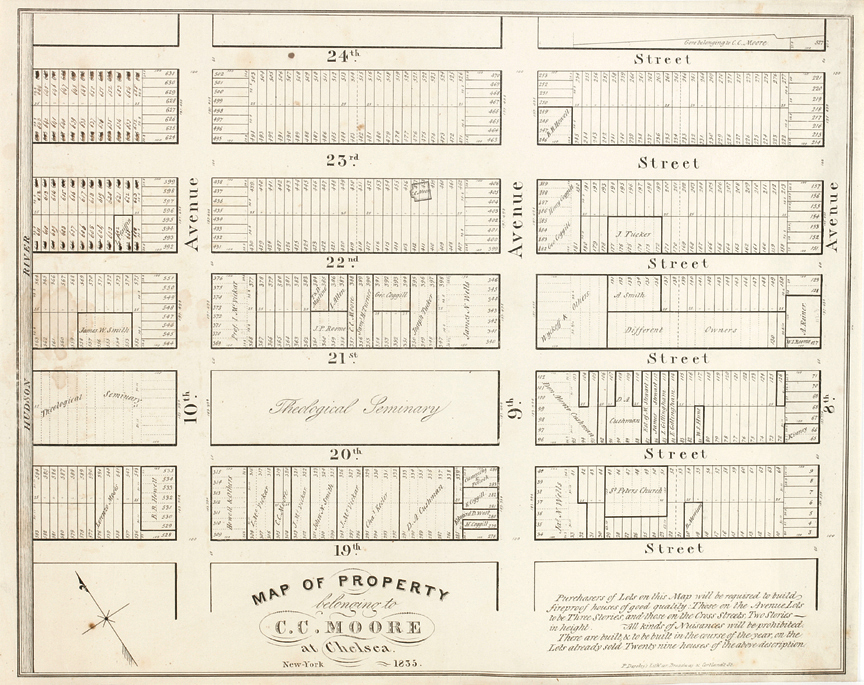
(6) Map called "Sale of Valuable Lots" (1835, P.A. Mesier's, Lithographers, New York)

Before European settlers arrived in the seventeenth century, the spot where the Walker House would be built lay on the northern edge of a Native American settlement called Sapokanikan. Lacking archaeological evidence and any Native American writings on the subject, current knowledge of the village comes exclusively from non-native sources. They say the settlement was peopled by craftworkers, traders, and fishers belonging to a clan of the Lenape indigenous people who occupied the place during the months when their beans, tobacco, and other crops needed tending. In the 1630s, as they expanded their holdings north from lower Manhattan, Dutch farmers mingled with the Sapokanikan villagers without serious conflict. However, in the early 1640s, New Amsterdam's director general, Willem Kieft, made an unprovoked armed attack on the Lenape and other tribes in New Amsterdam. The Indians' counter attacks forced the Dutch to negotiate a truce by treaty in 1645. The treaty established a legal process for resolving conflicts but resulted in the Lenape abandoning Sapokanikan.

A few years before the start of the war, Kieft issued a grant for farm land located where the Walker House would later be built. The land holder was a man named Jan Cornelissen of Rotterdam, also called Jan Van Rotterdam. A map made in 1639 by Dutch cartographer Joan Vinckeboons shows the property and its farmhouse. A detail from this map, shown here as Image No. 1, designates the property by the number 14 at center (the other number 14, to the right, indicates a second property granted to the same man). The map is oriented with north to the right so that the town of New Amsterdam, within its walls, is at far left. After Van Rotterdam's death in 1643, the property passed to his widow, who died in 1645. In 1652, the Dutch West India Company seized the property for non-payment of a debt and then leased it to Jan Jansen Langendye for ten years on his promise to pay the debt. In 1662, the New Netherland council granted the land jointly to Allard Anthony and Paulus Leenderts van der Grift. Since both men had held the position of burgomaster, an elected position analogous to mayor, the property, which had been known simply as land formerly occupied by Jan Van Rotterdam, became known as Burgomasters' Bouwerie (burgomasters' farm). After the British took over the colony in 1664, the governor of New York confirmed the two men as joint owners. In 1679, Van de Grift having previously acquired Anthony's interest in the property, he sold it to Jellis Jansen Mandeville. In 1701, Mandeville sold it to his son David. From this time forward, the property was called The Mandeville Farm. The document recording the sale, called an indenture, says it covered an area of fifty-three morgen, which at about one-half acre per morgen is equivalent to about twenty-six and one-half acres. It also says the property included at least one house, stable, orchard, garden, and meadow ground. It is named "Jellis Mandivill's Land" in a map made in 1773. A detail from a digital reproduction of this map is shown here as Image No. 2. The Mandeville farm appears on the top left (northwest) corner of this map.

It is also shown on a map of original grants and farms made by Jennie F. Macarthy and published in 1928. A detail from a digital image of this map is shown here as Image No. 3. The map shows the boundaries of farms on the modern grid of streets and each block has been given a sequential number. The Mandeville Farm covers some or all of blocks 713–717 on the west, followed by blocks 739–744, and parts of blocks 765–770. It is labeled "Burgomasters Bouwery" and "David Mandeville Farm" and it notes the grant from Governor Stuyvesant to Paulus Leenderts van de Grift and Allard Anthony dated March 14, 1662. In 1829, the Walker House was built in the northwest corner of block 744. From David Mandeville, the property passed to David Campbell and thence to James Rivington. Benjamin Moore obtained it from Rivington and in 1813 conveyed it to his son Clement Clarke Moore.

A record of New York residents in 1789 suggests that David Campbell might have been a lawyer. Rivington was well-known publisher and bookseller. During his life, Patriots denounced him as an outspoken Loyalist; historians have since found that he was a useful informant in the intelligence service run by George Washington. Benjamin Moore was an Episcopal bishop and president of Columbia University. He was also the reluctant priest who gave last rites to Alexander Hamilton. He bought the parcel of land that had been the Mandeville Farm in 1789. The previous year, he had married Charity Clarke the daughter of a retired British Army officer, Captain Thomas Clarke, who owned a large property on the north side of the parcel. On her death in 1802, Clarke's widow deeded the property to Charity and her husband and, in 1813, they in turn deeded it to their son Clement Clarke Moore. Thomas Clarke had given his property the ironic title, Chelsea, after the old soldiers' home in London and the name came to be applied to the Manhattan neighborhood and historic district of that name.

A map published in 1776 shows the general location of the Clarke estate. A detail from a digital reproduction of this map is shown here as Image No. 4. The parcel owned by Benjamin Moore was located directly to the north of the property marked "Oliver Delaney Esq.". The Clarke estate contained orchards, copses, and open fields, while the Moore strip of land contained arable land and fields. The road that led to the southeast corner of the Clarke estate and that gave access to Clarke property and the Moore strip was called Abingdon Road or Love Lane. Expressed in modern context, the estate, with the addition of Benjamin Moore's property, extended from Eighth Avenue on the east to river's edge at about Tenth Avenue on the west and from the north side of Nineteenth Street on the south to the south side of Twenty-fourth Street on the north. Shown against the modern grid of streets, Clement Clarke Moore's complete inheritance of is shown on a map made in 1891. A detail from a digital reproduction of this map is shown here as Image No. 5.

Celebrated as the author of A Visit from St. Nicholas, Clement Clarke Moore was a wealthy landowner, scholar, and benefactor of the Episcopal church in New York. At the time he received it from his parents, the estate that Captain Thomas Clarke had assembled was, as one writer said in 1892, "a quiet rural retreat on the banks of the river, far removed from the noise and bustle of the now crowded city". In 1811, Moore joined other landowners in opposing the city's plan to impose a grid of east-west streets and north-south avenues on Manhattan north of Houston Street. Soon after they lost that battle, the city constructed one of the new avenues, Ninth, through the eastern part of his holdings and soon after that Moore decided to donate a whole city block between two projected new streets, 20th and 21st, and between Ninth and projected Tenth Avenue. The recipient was the Episcopalian church's General Theological Seminary where Moore taught Asian and Greek languages and literature. Construction of the seminary's buildings began in 1819 and was completed in 1827. Two years later, Moore leased a plot for construction of the first private residence to be built on his land. The plot lay across 20th Street near the corner of Ninth Avenue. The lessee was a man named Hugh Walker.

In 1833, Moore partnered with a builder named James N. Wells to offer leases for the construction of other buildings within the bounds of his holdings. Aiming to develop the property as a relatively low density residential neighborhood, the two men made a plan to prepare side streets and lay out a grid of lots, each 25 feet wide and 100 feet deep, for which they would offer long-term leases. The two men consulted with the leaseholders who came after Walker signed his lease and they mutually agreed to require themselves and subsequent leaseholders to build mostly single-family structures having ten-foot setbacks from the street. The houses were to be no more than two stories and to have back yards accessible only from the houses themselves, not via a side alleyway. The group prohibited stables and commercial buildings from side streets and required tree planting.

In 1835, a real estate firm employed by Moore and Wells published an advertising map showing the lots that were available for lease, indicating which had been committed to lessees, and stating some of the restrictions placed on the leaseholds. A digital reproduction of this map is shown here as Image No. 6. The map shows the lot occupied by the Walker House without any label save its number, 339, and a notation of its twenty-five-foot width.

Wells died in 1860 and Moore in 1863. The heirs of both men continued to lease or sell empty lots and expired leaseholds into the twentieth century. Asked the value of the Moore property in 1931, the head of the Wells realty firm gave an estimate of $40,000,000.

== Lease and construction ==
Hugh Walker paid forty dollars per year for his leasehold in 1829. Moore's lease gave Walker seven years in which to build "a good and substantial house...being two stories or more, constructed of brick or stone, or having a brick or stone front." Walker, who earned his living as a grocer, complied by building a two and one-half story clapboard-sided frame house having a north-facing Federal-style facade of red brick laid in Flemish bond. The house was set back from the street, allowing for palings and a small garden. It was about twenty-three feet wide, leaving a space of about two feet to the edge of the lot on its east side. In 2011, a record in New York City's Automated City Register Information System described the property as "Beginning at a point on the southerly side of 20th Street, distant 100 feet westerly from the corner formed by the intersection of the southerly line or side of 20th Street with the westerly line or side of Ninth Avenue; running thence southerly, parallel with Ninth Avenue, 109 feet; thence westerly, parallel with 20th Street, 25 feet; thence northerly, parallel with Ninth Avenue, 109 feet to the southerly line or side of 20th Street; thence easterly, along the southerly line or side of 20th Street, 25 feet to the point or place of beginning."

== Subsequent modifications ==
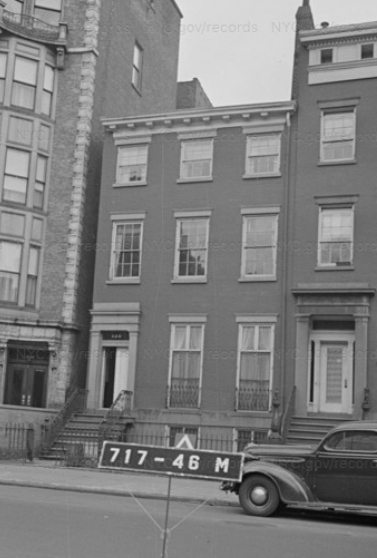
(7) Real Property Tax Photo taken for the Works Project Administration and the New York City Tax Department showing Block 717, Lot 46, 404 West 20th Street in 1939 or 1940

(8) Leslie Doyel standing in front of the Walker House in 1965, the year her family bought the building

One of the new lessees who were named on the advertising map of 1835 was a friend of Moore and Wells, the merchant and real estate developer Don Alonzo Cushman. In the years 1839–1840, Cushman built a row of houses adjoining the Walker House on its west side, all of them uniformly designed in the currently-fashionable Greek-revival style. In time, this set of townhouses, by then called Cushman Row, came to be considered "one of the most splendid groups of townhouses in New York." The Cushman Row design influence was apparently strong enough to convince at least one person who owned the Walker House to modify its Federal facade to one that showed the Greek-Revival influence of the buildings next door. The decision to modify may have come from pressure exerted by Cushman and the rest of the group of lessees with whom Moore and Wells consulted since they had attempted to impose a requirement that houses built after theirs were constructed would mostly conform to the design of existing houses. In any event, during the second half of the nineteenth century owners of the Walker House remodeled the front doorway in Greek-Revival style, raised the roof to give it a modillioned cornice, and replaced the wrought-iron railings. Also new were the doorway's pilasters and entablature (both made of wood rather than the more usual stone). In 1897, the Walker House was joined on its east side by an Italianate apartment house that was built by a daughter of Don Alonzo Cushman who named it "DONAC", an acronym of his name. There were no major changes to the Walker House facade during the twentieth century. A tax photograph, taken in 1939 or 1940, shows its nineteenth-century modifications. It appears here as Image No. 7. In it, the sign, held by the photographer's assistant, shows the block and lot numbers of the property. Another photo, taken in 1965, shows how little the facade had changed in intervening years. In it, you can see the clapboard siding on the building's east side. It appears here as Image No. 8. Image No. 9 shows part of the facade some fifty-five years later. It shows the iron work, treatment of windows and doors, and alley. There is evidence of brick repair, but, again, little is substantively different from the earlier photos.

== Owners and tenants ==
Many of the Walker House's owners and tenants can be traced. After Hugh Walker died in 1829, his wife Mary inherited the lease and house. She remained there until 1833, when she relinquished it to Moore's partner James N. Wells. The next land-rent lessee and house owner was Timothy Coffin, a grain merchant. In 1880, he transferred ownership to Thomas Cotterell, a tailor who appears to have been the first to rent rooms to tenants. In 1885, Cotterell sold to E. Holbrook Cushman, a son of Don Alonzo Cushman, who immediately conveyed the property to other members of the Cushman family. Thereafter, the Walker House remained in the Cushman family until 1945, when it sold to Simeon J. Tropp. A year later, Tropp transferred the property to E. Audrey Distler. In 1965, John S. Doyel bought the house after having rented it for twelve years. In 2015, a privately held corporation called 404 W 20 LLC bought the house from the Doyel family estate. A 2019 article in The 'New York Times identifies the person behind the private corporation as British investment banker Ajoy Veer Kapoor.

Joseph Dixon, an inventor, entrepreneur, and manufacturer, was the Walker House's first prominent renter. He and his family and servants lived there between 1894 and 1907. Edward Sims Van Zile, an author and playwright, lived there with his wife, daughter, and servants between 1908 and 1910. Between 1917 and 1943, the artist Ann Brockman lived in the Walker House with her husband William C. McNulty. McNulty, also an artist, lived there for another two years following Brockman's death.

This list gives the names of other people who have rented apartments in Walker House. (Note: Where none other is cited, the source is the database of New York City directories maintained by ancestry.com.) There are no records of tenants after 404 w 20 LLC bought the house. (Note: A search of newspapers and real estate websites uncovered no tenants between 1965, when John S. Doyle bought the house, until 2024.)

1. 1876 Aigner John, upholsterer
2. 1876 James H. Wickes, merchant (refrigerators)
3. 1878–1879 William H. Klapp, drygoods merchant
4. 1879 Andrew H. Butler, decorator
5. 1879 Harriet A. Butler
6. 1879 William H Klapp, merchant (drygoods)
7. 1880 John M Moffitt, sculptor
8. 1886 Edward M. Deems, Presbyterian minister
9. 1888 Walter W. Price, clerk
10. 1890 Clare F. Somers
11. 1893 Mrs. Jane Kitching
12. 1896 Susan Duffy, musician
13. 1897 Elizabeth Selma Lazareff
14. 1903 Michael Walsh and Elizabeth West
15. 1904–1907 George Doyle, mason; Louis John, clerk; and Mary A. Strubin, widow of Albert
16. 1917 William Disraeli Bedford, painter and decorator
17. 1920–1924 Jack Bechdolt, cartoonist, and his wife Mabel Claire, author
18. 1922 Charles Shreve Hallowell, advertising
19. 1940 Frank Gunter and his wife Sue and Elinor J. Oldenburg
20. 1950 Lovdal, Norwegian concert pianist, tenant
21. 1952–1956 James S. Doyel and family, as already noted

== Controversy over proposed conversion to condominiums ==
The Walker House is located within the Chelsea Historic District but is not listed in the National Register of Historic Places. Historic District rules cover the "exterior elements" of buildings within their boundaries. The emphasis is on preserving their appearance as viewed from "any public thoroughfare". In addition to exterior restoration and repair, they allow, with some restrictions, rooftop, rear, and side yard additions. The New York City Landmarks Preservation Commission is charged with administering the rules.

In 2016, the new owner of the Walker House applied to the commission for permission to make extensive changes to the building. Immediately thereafter, Local groups and individuals began a campaign to prevent the owner from making the proposed changes. They did so in testimony at a public hearing held by the commission and in subsequent publications and interviews with reporters. The opponents included the city's local advisory committee, a representative body called Manhattan Community Board 4. A letter from the chair of Community Board 4 said that the proposed changes would, in effect, "demolish the entire house except for its brick street facade." Supporters of the proposed alterations said the proposed work was necessary because the structure was in serious disrepair and might be structurally unsound. A letter to the commission from the executive director of the Greenwich Village Society for Historic Preservation said the disrepair issue was "bogus or self-created, or both" and that some of the problems cited were caused by the owner's failure to keep the unoccupied house heated through the winter months. The Doyels, who sold the house to Kapoor in 2015, produced a letter to them from the commission's deputy counsel saying "I was in your home after its sale to the current owner when it was being inspected by an engineer from the Department of Buildings. I can attest that the house was not, at the time, in a neglected state as has been alleged." Supporters and critics agreed that the house was definitely the oldest surviving one in the Chelsea neighborhood.

After reviewing the critics' testimony and submissions, the commission granted permits to the owner to proceed with the proposed alterations. The permits were set to expire in 2022 but were extended to 2027.

When it extended the permits, the commission issued a document that summarized the proposed changes, as approved. The three above-ground stories would be expanded into the backyard. The basement would be expanded under the front setback and also into the backyard. The alley separating the house from its neighbor to the east would be filled in. The roof would be modified and raised. The facade would be restored without substantially altering its appearance.

H5 Properties is a real estate marketing firm that specializes in producing virtual stagings and other renderings via a combination of photography and computer graphics. The company prepares digital images of properties to show them as they might appear after they have been altered or renovated. In 2018, they made a set of images that show the Walker House alterations, including both the changes approved by the commission and interior changes that are outside the scope of the commission's jurisdiction. They show a two-unit condominium having six bedrooms and five baths and elevator access to five of its six and one-half floors. The set contains five photo-like images, or "renderings", indicating what the Walker House would look like after its conversion to a condominium. The rendering of the facade showed the closing-in of the small alley between the house and the building on its east side and otherwise differ little from the pre-renovation appearance of the facade. Accounts giving the amount of living space in the house prior to and following renovation show that the area would about increase by nearly 200% from 4,562 square feet to 8,882 square feet, In 2018, the Trulia real estate company reproduced the H5 renderings and listed the property as off the market. It also gave four instances between 2018 and 2022 when the property was put on the market for sale, with prices ranging from $7,100,00 to $10,950,000. From 2016 to time of writing (February 2024), the Walker House has remained vacant and no construction has been reported at the location.
